= Irish Tour '74 =

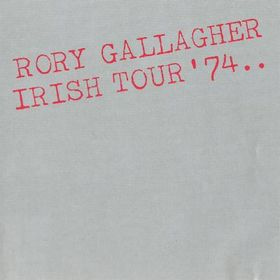

Live album by Rory Gallagher
- Released: July 1974
- Recorded: 2–4 January 1974
- Genre: Blues rock
- Length: 79:27
- Labels: Polydor 2659 031 (UK); Polydor 9501 (USA); Buddha 99650 (CD reissue)
- Producer: Rory Gallagher

Rory Gallagher chronology
Tattoo (1973)	Irish Tour '74 (1974)	Against the Grain (1975)

Alternative cover
- cover of the CD version

Professional ratings
Review scores
Source	Rating
AllMusic	4.5/5 stars
AllAboutJazz	5/5 stars
Uncut	8/10

Irish Tour '74 is the sixth album by Rory Gallagher. It is a live album compiled from performances during Gallagher's Irish Tour in January 1974. The source concerts were recorded at Belfast Ulster Hall, Dublin Carlton Cinema and Cork City Hall using Ronnie Lane's Mobile Studio. "Back on My Stompin' Ground (After Hours)" was recorded from a jam session during the tour. Irish Tour '74 has sold in excess of two million copies worldwide. An article in a Belfast daily newspaper stated: "Rory Gallagher never forgot Northern Ireland, he returned throughout the '70s when few other artists of his calibre dared come near the place."

== Background ==
Gallagher never enjoyed going into the studio to make records. Playing to a live audience was essential, he thought, to get the real energy needed for the kind of music he wanted to play. The members of his band felt the same way. Speaking about the Irish tour album keyboardist Lou Martin said "Albums were always done in a rush because we were on the road so much, and then we’d come back to London and it could be two weeks – like Blueprint was done in two weeks – and that is ridiculous,... but Irish Tour was an absolute highlight,... the band came to fruition in the Calling Card days, by that time we were well seasoned … everybody knew everybody else’s style of playing... The studio was not the best environment for recording. He wasn’t at his most comfortable or happiest, I mean a lot of people really adapted to it really well like The Allman Brothers or Little Feat. With Rory, if he didn’t have somebody to look at then he couldn’t feed off the energy. That’s why Irish Tour is such a good bloody album because it was recorded live, he got the crowd there with him singing along and sort of like urging him along… without the presence of an audience the recording process for Rory was a bit of a strain."

Gallagher's 1974 tour of Ireland coincided with one of the most tumultuous times in Belfast. Violence between the IRA and British Army was erupting throughout the city even at rock concerts. As a result, most rock acts refused to play in the city. The day before Gallagher's scheduled concert in Belfast ten bombs went off at various locations around the city. Everyone expected Gallagher to cancel as all the other big names had but he went on with the concert and was rewarded with one of his best shows. A local Belfast journalist writing to describe the concert and the feeling said:

I've never seen anything quite so wonderful, so stirring, so uplifting, so joyous as when Gallagher and the band walked on stage. The whole place erupted, they all stood and they cheered and they yelled, and screamed, and they put their arms up, and they embraced. Then as one unit they put their arms into the air and gave peace signs. Without being silly, or overemotional, it was one of the most memorable moments of my life. It all meant something, it meant more than just rock n' roll, it was something bigger, something more valid than just that.

Additionally, rock film director Tony Palmer filmed many of the concerts on the tour. He originally planned to use it for a television special, but he later found the footage so good that he released it as a theatrical motion picture. The accompanying album would be considered the "soundtrack" of the film.

== Track listing ==
All tracks composed by Rory Gallagher unless stated.

Side One

1. "Cradle Rock" [from Tattoo] – 7:38
2. "I Wonder Who" (McKinley Morganfield) – 7:52
3. "Tattoo'd Lady" [from Tattoo] – 5:04

Side Two

1. "Too Much Alcohol" (J. B. Hutto) – 8:30
2. "As the Crow Flies" (Tony Joe White) – 6:02
3. "A Million Miles Away" [from Tattoo] – 9:29

Side Three

1. "Walk on Hot Coals" [from Blueprint] – 11:13
2. "Who's That Coming?" [from Tattoo] – 10:05

Side Four

1. "Back on My Stompin' Ground (After Hours)" – 5:18
2. "Just a Little Bit" – 8:17 (Rosco Gordon)

=== 40th anniversary box set ===
On 20 October 2014 Sony Music and Legacy Recordings released a deluxe, 7-CD/1-DVD box set to commemorate the album's 40th anniversary.

Discs 1 & 2
Cork (3 & 5 January 1974)

1. "Messin' with the Kid"* (Mel London)
2. "Cradle Rock"
3. "I Wonder Who"
4. "Tattoo'd Lady"
5. "Walk on Hot Coals"
6. "Laundromat"*
7. "A Million Miles Away"
8. "Hands Off"*
9. "Too Much Alcohol"

Cd 2

1. "As the Crow Flies"
2. "Pistol Slapper Blues"*
3. "Unmilitary Two-Step"*
4. "Bankers Blues"*
5. "Going to My Hometown"*
6. "Who's That Coming"
7. "In Your Town"*

Discs 3 & 4
Dublin (2 January 1974)

1. "Cradle Rock"*
2. "Tattoo'd Lady"*
3. "Hands Off"*
4. "Walk on Hot Coals"*
5. "Laundromat"*
6. "Too Much Alcohol"*
7. "A Million Miles Away"*
8. "As the Crow Flies"*
9. "Pistol Slapper Blues"*
10. "Bankers Blues"*
11. "Unmilitary Two-Step"*
12. "Going to My Hometown"*
13. "In Your Town"*
14. "Bullfrog Blues"*

Discs 5 & 6
Belfast (29 December 1973)

1. "Messin' with the Kid"*
2. "Cradle Rock"*
3. "Tattoo'd Lady"*
4. "Walk on Hot Coals"*
5. "Hands Off"*
6. "A Million Miles Away"*
7. "Laundromat"*
8. "As the Crow Flies"*
9. "Pistol Slapper Blues"*
10. "Unmilitary Two-Step"*
11. "Bankers Blues"*
12. "Going to My Hometown"*
13. "Who's That Coming"*
14. "In Your Town"*
15. "Bullfrog Blues"*

Disc 7
Cork, City Hall in Session (3 January 1974)

1. "Maritime (The Edgar Lustgarten Cut)"
2. "I Want You" / "Raunchy Medley"*
3. "Treat Her Right"
4. "I Wonder Who"*
5. "Too Much Alcohol"*
6. "Just a Little Bit"
7. "I Can't Be Satisfied"*
8. "Acoustic Medley"*
9. "Back on My Stompin' Ground (After Hours)"
10. "Stompin' Ground" (Alt version)

(*previously unreleased)

Disc 8 (DVD)
Irish Tour '74 (film)

== Personnel ==
- Rory Gallagher – vocals, guitar, harmonica
- Gerry McAvoy – bass guitar
- Lou Martin – RMI Electra Piano
- Rod de'Ath – drums

Technical

- Robin Sylvester – engineer
- Mark Jesset – artwork, art direction

== Charts ==
=== Album ===
Year	Chart	Position
1974	Billboard Top 200 Albums	110
2014	Billboard Top Blues Albums	7
