= Irish Tour '74 (film) =

Irish Tour 1974
- Directed by: Tony Palmer
- Produced by: Donal Gallagher
- Starring: Rory Gallagher, Gerry McAvoy, Lou Martin, Rod de'Ath
- Cinematography: Les Young
- Music by: Rory Gallagher
- Distributed by: Eagle Vision
- Release date: 11 April 2011 (US)
- Running time: 57 min.
- Language: English

Irish Tour '74 is a film directed by Tony Palmer. It documents Rory Gallagher's tour of Ireland in 1974. Gallagher toured at a time of great political turmoil and violence. Gallagher's band at the time was Gerry McAvoy on bass guitar, Lou Martin on keyboards and Rod de'Ath on drums.

== Background ==
Tony Palmer was a founder of BBC Four's Kaleidoscope radio programme. Palmer first came into contact with Rory Gallagher when he filmed Cream's Farewell Concert in 1968. Gallagher was the front man for the band Taste at the time and Taste opened for Cream at that concert. Palmer decided to film the concerts on Gallagher's next Irish tour. He originally planned to use the footage for a television special, but he later found it so good that he released it as a theatrical motion picture. Gallagher also released a double album that was considered the soundtrack of the film.

Gallagher's 1974 tour of Northern Ireland coincided with one of the most tumultuous times in the region. Violence from Irish Republican Army and Loyalists was erupting throughout the region at public events such as rock concerts. In this environment most groups didn't tour the region but Gallagher continued his tour as planned to Belfast Ulster Hall, Dublin Carlton Cinema, and Cork City Hall. The day before Gallagher's scheduled concert in Belfast ten bombs went off at various locations around the city. Everyone expected Gallagher to cancel as all the other big names had but he went on with the concert. A local Belfast journalist writing to describe the concert said:

"I've never seen anything quite so wonderful, so stirring, so uplifting, so joyous as when Gallagher and the band walked on stage. The whole place erupted, they all stood and they cheered and they yelled, and screamed, and they put their arms up, and they embraced. Then as one unit they put their arms into the air and gave peace signs. Without being silly, or overemotional, it was one of the most memorable moments of my life. It all meant something, it meant more than just rock n' roll, it was something bigger, something more valid than just that."

== Overview ==
The film opens with large waves crashing against a rocky Irish coast. Rising up in volume eventually over powering the waves is the sound of Gallagher's guitar as he leads into the first song Walk on Hot Coals. The camera cuts to concert footage of Gallagher and the band playing the song. The film then alternates between various interviews backstage and in locations around Gallagher's home town with performances. Each song is performed complete. Gallagher and the band perform Tattoo'd Lady, Who's That Coming?, and A Million Miles Away. For the next song, a traditional blues number Goin' to My Home Town Gallagher performs mostly on his own with a mandolin. He calls out to the audience "do you want to go?" and they reply enthusiastically. During that song the film cuts between the concert footage and footage of British army trucks rolling through Belfast and British soldiers clashing with local residents. After that song the film cuts to footage of Gallagher in his native Cork. He walks the streets, signs autographs and talks with people about music and guitars in a local music shop. The next song Cradle Rock is back to blues rock then Gallagher performs an acoustic folk number As The Crow Flies. The finale of the film (as it often was for Gallagher's concerts at the time) is the hard driving Bullfrog Blues with virtuoso guitar playing from Gallagher and a chance for each member of the band to solo as well.

== Scene listing ==
All songs composed by Rory Gallagher unless stated

1. Intro of waves crashing on Irish coast
2. Walk on Hot Coals – 1:07
3. Backstage interviews with Gallagher and band – 7:32
4. Tattoo'd Lady – 15:18
5. Gallagher demonstrates slide guitar techniques – 20:15
6. Who's That Coming? – 21:48
7. Gallagher in his home town – 30:05
8. A Million Miles Away – 30:58
9. Goin' to My Home Town (Traditional arranged by Gallagher) – 38:00
10. Gallagher in a music store – 43:12
11. Cradle Rock – 46:00
12. Jam session with Gallagher and band – 52:02
13. Gallagher demonstrates blues guitar techniques – 54:50
14. As the Crow Flies (Tony Joe White) – 57:50
15. Hands Off – 1:02:11
16. Backstage with Gallagher and band – 1:06:40
17. Jamming in the pub – 1:11:44
18. Bullfrog Blues (William Harris) – 1:15:17
19. End of concert and credits – 1:22:39

== Personnel ==
- Rory Gallagher – vocals, guitar, harmonica, mandolin
- Gerry McAvoy – bass guitar
- Lou Martin – keyboards
- Rod de'Ath – drums
- Tony Palmer – director
- Donal Gallagher – producer
