= Lou Martin =

- Martin in the film Irish Tour '74

Background information
- Born: Louis Michael Martin; 12 August 1949; Belfast, Northern Ireland
- Died: 17 August 2012 (aged 63) Bournemouth, England
- Genres: Blues rock; rock; boogie woogie
- Occupations: Musician; songwriter; record producer
- Instruments: Piano; keyboards; mandolin; guitar
- Formerly of: Killing Floor

Louis Michael Martin (12 August 1949 – 17 August 2012) was a piano and organ player from Belfast, Northern Ireland. He was an original member of the London-based band Killing Floor, and also worked with fellow Irish musician Rory Gallagher.

== Career ==
Martin started learning the piano at the age of six, and joined his first professional band, Killing Floor, in April or May 1968. In 1969 Martin and Stuart McDonald were recruited by 17-year-old Darryl Read who formed a band for Jeff Pasternak, Emperor Rosko's brother, called Crayon Angels, with Read playing drums, and Rosko acting as manager. Martin later left Killing Floor to play alongside Gallagher, and is featured on several of Gallagher's albums, including Blueprint, Tattoo, Irish Tour '74, Against the Grain, Calling Card, Defender and Fresh Evidence. He also played rhythm guitar on one track, "Race the Breeze" from Blueprint.

After leaving Gallagher's band, Martin and drummer Rod de'Ath formed Ramrod, after which Martin played with Downliners Sect and Screaming Lord Sutch, and also toured with Chuck Berry and Albert Collins.

Martin played in the Nickey Barclay band in London in the 1980s, alongside Barclay (ex-Fanny) on keyboards, with John Conroy (ex-Sam Mitchell Band) and Dave Ball on lead guitar (ex-Procol Harum). The band played across London on the blues-rock circuit during the 1980s at venues such as The White Lion, Putney; The Star and Garter on Lower Richmond Road; The Golden Lion, Fulham and the Cartoon, Croydon.

Killing Floor released an album in 2004 named Zero Tolerance, on which Martin participated.

== Death ==
After a period of illness including cancer and a number of strokes, Martin died in a Bournemouth, Dorset, hospital on 17 August 2012, aged 63.
