= Tattoo (Rory Gallagher album) =

Studio album by Rory Gallagher
- Released: 9 November 1973
- Recorded: August 1973
- Studio: Polydor Studios, London
- Genre: Blues rock
- Length: 46:51 (original release); 58:52 (1999 remaster)
- Label: Polydor 2383 230 (UK); Polydor 5539 (USA)
- Producer: Rory Gallagher

Rory Gallagher chronology
Blueprint (1973)	Tattoo (1973)	Irish Tour (1974)

Professional ratings
Review scores
Source	Rating
Allmusic	4.0/5 stars
Rolling Stone	(very favorable)
Uncut	8/10

Tattoo is the fourth studio album and fifth album overall released by Rory Gallagher, in 1973.

== Background ==
Classic Rock magazine opined that Tattoo was an album that "crossed many genres of rock and roll and showcased the writing talents of Rory Gallagher more than any of his previous records." BBC's reviewer noted that while Gallagher "toured constantly," he still "found time away from the stage to write so many great songs," adding that "Tattoo is perhaps the pick of the bunch: a near-perfect document of the powerful, passionate performances that placed Rory in a league of his own." For the reviewer, the album was "a scintillating showcase for Rory’s mastery of his craft" from "the laid back vibe of opener "Tattoo'd Lady," the raunchy riffing of "Cradle Rock" and "Admit It" to quieter moments such as the acoustically driven "20:20 Vision."

"Cradle Rock" was inspired by the "happy coincidence" that Gallagher "rocked literally all his life" having been born at the Rock Hospital in Ballyshannon, Ireland. The track was also covered by Joe Bonamassa on his debut album A New Day Yesterday.

According to Rory's brother, Donal, Polydor did not "properly promote" the album.

== Track listing ==
All songs composed by Rory Gallagher except where noted.

Side one

1. "Tattoo'd Lady" – 4:34
2. "Cradle Rock" – 6:15
3. "20:20 Vision" – 4:02
4. "They Don't Make Them Like You Anymore" – 4:05
5. "Livin' Like a Trucker" – 4:19

Side two

1. "Sleep on a Clothes Line" – 5:13
2. "Who's That Coming" – 7:09
3. "A Million Miles Away" – 6:55
4. "Admit It" – 4:19

CD bonus track

1. "Tucson, Arizona" (Link Wray) – 3:47
2. "Just a Little Bit" – 7:43 (Rosco Gordon)

Track listing on French LP

- Side 1 : "Tattoo'd Lady" - "They Don't Make..." - "A Million Miles Away" - "Who's That Coming" - "Livin' Like a Trucker"
- Side 2 : "Cradle Rock" - "Admit It" - "20:20 Vision" - "Sleep on a Clothes Line"

== Personnel ==
- Rory Gallagher – guitars, vocals, harmonica, saxophone, mandolin, bouzouki
- Gerry McAvoy – bass guitar
- Lou Martin – keyboards, accordion
- Rod de'Ath – drums, percussion

Technical

- Carlos Olms – engineer
- Robin Sylvester – remixing engineer
- Robin Lawrie – cover illustration

== Charts ==
Chart performance for "Tattoo"
Chart (2025)	Peak position
Greek Albums (IFPI)	29
