= Tony Palmer (director) =

English film director and author (born 1941)

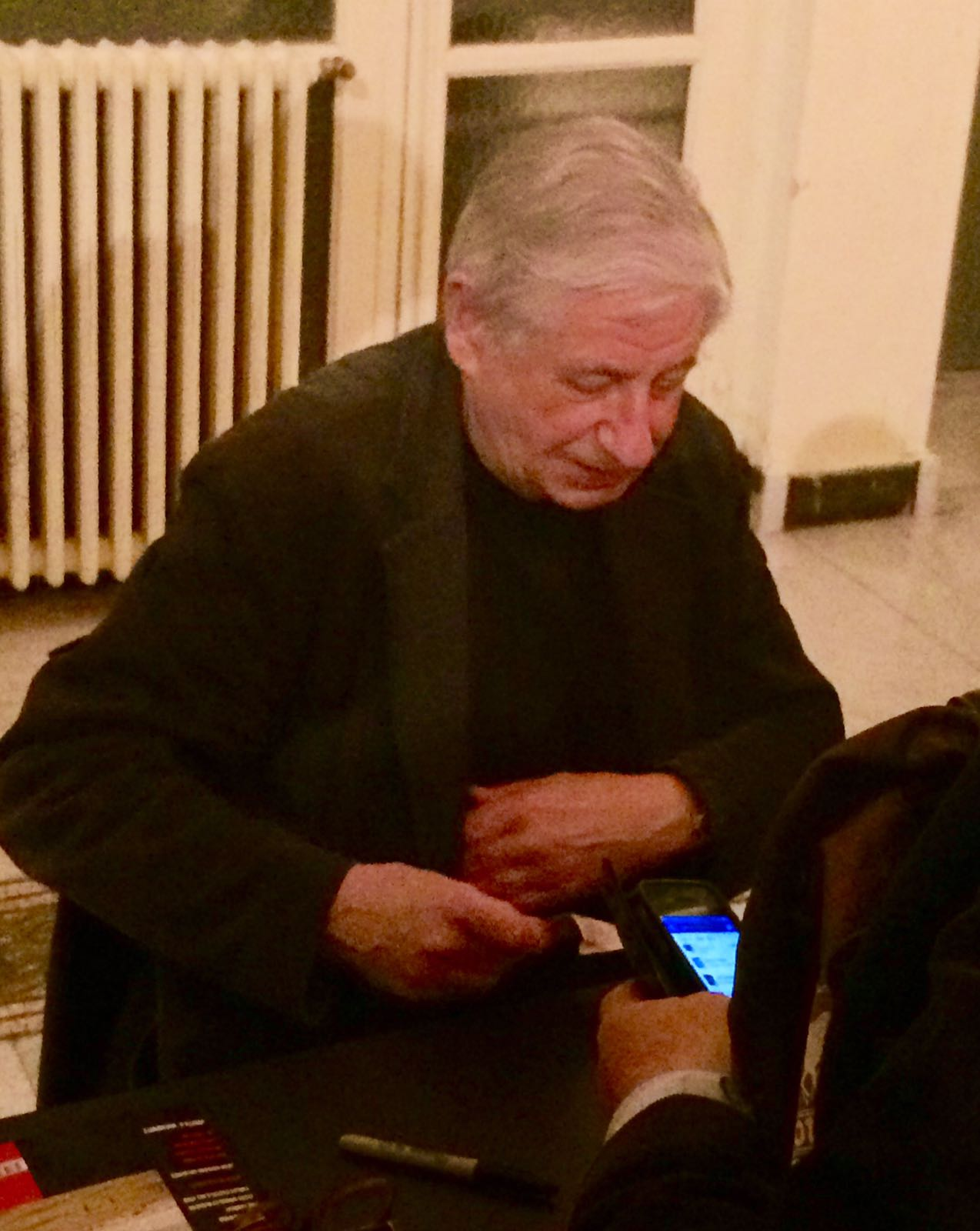
Tony Palmer in the Círculo de Bellas Artes

Tony Palmer (born 29 August 1941) is a British film director and author. His work includes over 100 films, ranging from early works with the Beatles, Cream, Jimi Hendrix, Rory Gallagher (Irish Tour '74) and Frank Zappa (200 Motels), to his classical portraits which include profiles of Maria Callas, Margot Fonteyn, John Osborne, Igor Stravinsky, Richard Wagner, Yehudi Menuhin, Julian Lloyd Webber, Carl Orff, Benjamin Britten and Ralph Vaughan Williams. He is also a stage director of theatre and opera.

Among over 40 international prizes for his work are 12 Gold Medals from the New York Film Festival as well as numerous BAFTAs and Emmy Awards. Palmer has won the Prix Italia twice, for A Time There Was in 1980 and At the Haunted End of the Day in 1981. He is a Fellow of the Royal Geographical Society, and an honorary citizen of both New Orleans and Athens.

== Background ==
Tony Palmer was born in London, England. He was educated at Lowestoft Grammar School, Cambridgeshire High School for Boys and Trinity Hall, Cambridge, where he read History and Moral Sciences. From Cambridge (where he was also President of the Marlowe Society), he joined the BBC. Following an apprenticeship with Ken Russell and Jonathan Miller, Palmer's first major film, Benjamin Britten & his Festival, became the first BBC film to be networked in the United States. With his second film, All My Loving, an examination of rock and roll and politics in the late 1960s, he achieved considerable notoriety.

In 1989, he was awarded a retrospective of his work at the National Film Theatre in London, the first maker of arts films to be so honoured.

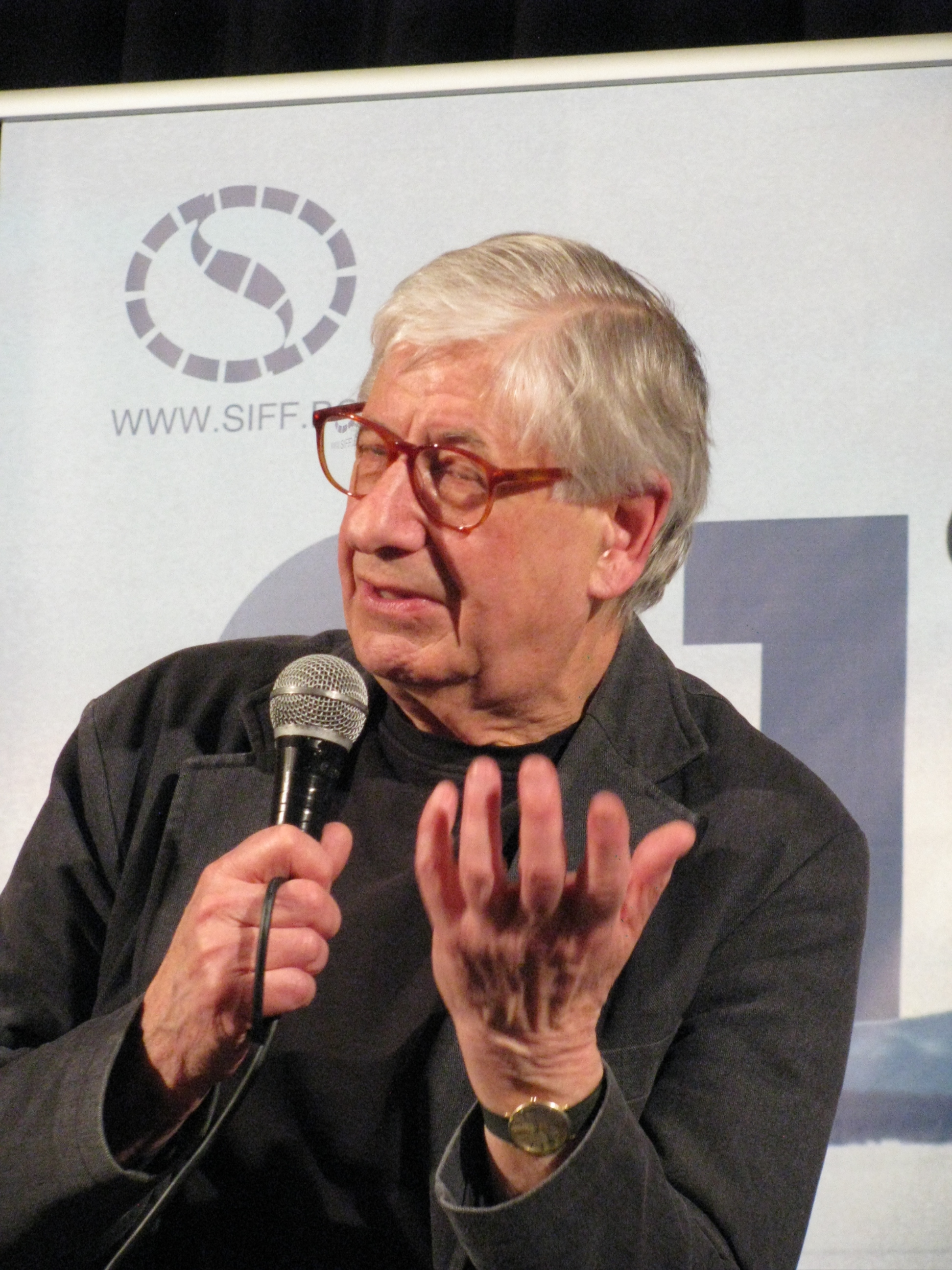
Tony Palmer at Sofia international Film Festival, March 2017.

== Opera, theatre and rock music ==
In addition to films, Palmer has also directed in the theatre and in the opera house. After a debut at the Zurich Opera House in 1989 with Peter Grimes ("the high point of the season", Neue Zürcher Zeitung), he had a double triumph in Karlsruhe, War and Peace, described as "marvellously suited to the stage and packed with impressive scenes and powerful outbursts of uninhibited activity". and again in Zurich with Berlioz's opera, The Trojans in 1990 ("marvellous" – London Daily Express). In Saint Petersburg, he directed the first performance in Russia for 80 years of Parsifal, conducted by Valery Gergiev, with Alexey Steblyanko in the title role. He has also directed in Hamburg, Munich, Augsburg, Savonlinna, Berlin and Helsinki and recently became the first Western director ever to work at the Bolshoi in Moscow.

Parsifal won Best Theatre Production ('Casta Diva') in Moscow, 1997, as well as a 'Golden Mask'. On the West End stage he has directed the world premiere of John Osborne's Look Back in Anger Part Two, Déjà Vu. Mr Palmer also presented the BBC Radio 3 Arts magazine Night Waves, for which he won a Sony Award for best arts programme.

Palmer is also well known for his rock music documentaries, several of them among the first of the genre and covering everyone from the Beatles to Cream. All My Loving (1968) was Palmer's groundbreaking BBC series on pop music (which John Lennon personally requested he make) featuring Eric Clapton, Eric Burdon, Jimi Hendrix and others against the backdrop of the Vietnam War, and other explosive political events rocking the 1960s. Palmer went on to make 200 Motels, a documentary about America avant-garde rock musician Frank Zappa. It is considered a rock classic but, in a 2017 interview with Toronto arts reporter and critic Deirdre Kelly, Palmer called it one of the worst films he ever did.

== Writing ==
Palmer has published several books, and has written for The New York Times, The Times, Punch, Life magazine etc. From 1967 to 1974 he was a regular music critic for The Observer. From 1969 to 1974 he had a weekly column in The Spectator entitled 'Notes from the Underground'.

== Filmography ==
- Isadora Duncan, the Biggest Dancer in the World (TV) (as director's assistant – Director Ken Russell) (1966)
- Alice in Wonderland (TV) [as Producer – Director Jonathan Miller] (1966)
- The Art of Conducting – with Georg Solti (1966)
- Up the Theatre – with Judi Dench (1966)
- Conceit (1967)
- Benjamin Britten & his Festival (1967)
- Burning Fiery Furnace (1967)
- Corbusier (1967)
- Twice a Fortnight (TV series) – with Terry Jones & Michael Palin (1967)
- All My Loving (1968)
- Cream's Farewell Concert (1968)
- The World of Peter Sellers (1969)
- How It Is (1969)
- Rope Ladder to the Moon – Jack Bruce (1969)
- Colosseum and Juicy Lucy (1970)
- Fairport Convention & Matthews Southern Comfort (1970)
- Glad All Over (1970)
- National Youth Theatre – Michael Croft (1970)
- 200 Motels – Frank Zappa (1971)
- Brighton Breezy (1971)
- Mahler 9 – with Leonard Bernstein (1971)
- Ginger Baker in Africa (1971)
- Birmingham (1971)
- The Pursuit of Happiness (1972)
- The World of Liberace (1972)
- The World of Hugh Hefner (1973)
- International Youth Orchestra (1973)
- Bird on a Wire – with Leonard Cohen (1974)
- Rory Gallagher – Irish Tour '74 (1974)
- The World of Miss World (1974)
- Tangerine Dream – live at Coventry Cathedral (1975)
- All This and World War II (1976)
- All You Need is Love (1976–1980)
- The Wigan Casino (1977)
- Biddu (1977)
- The Edinburgh Festival (1977)
- The Mighty Wurlitzer (1978)
- The Edinburgh Festival Revisited (1978)
- The Space Movie – NASA's official 10th anniversary film, music by Mike Oldfield (1979)
- Pride of Place [6 parts] (1979)
- A Time There Was – profile of Benjamin Britten (1979)
- First Edition (1980)
- At the Haunted End of the Day – profile of William Walton (1980)
- Death in Venice – opera by Benjamin Britten (1981)
- Once, at a Border... – profile of Igor Stravinsky (1982)
- Wagner – by Charles Wood, starring Richard Burton (1983)
- Primal Scream – Art Janov (1984)
- Puccini – with Virginia McKenna & Robert Stephens (1984)
- God Rot Tunbridge Wells! – by John Osborne (1984/5)
- Mozart in Japan – with Mitsuko Uchida (1986)
- Testimony – starring Ben Kingsley (1987)
- Maria Callas (1987)
- In from the Cold? – Richard Burton (1988)
- Dvořák - In Love? – Julian Lloyd Webber (1988)
- Hindemith – a Pilgrim's Progress – with John Gielgud (1989)
- The Children (1990)
- Menuhin, a Family Story (1990)
- I, Berlioz – with Corin Redgrave (1992)
- Symphony of Sorrowful Songs – Henryk Górecki (1993)
- A Short Film About Loving – with Peter Sellars (1994)
- O Fortuna – Carl Orff (1995)
- England, My England – Henry Purcell (1995)
- Brahms & The Little Singing Girls (1996)
- Michael Crawford, a true story (1996)
- Hail Bop – a profile of John Adams (1997)
- Parsifal – with Plácido Domingo & Valery Gergiev (1997)
- The Harvest of Sorrow – Sergei Rachmaninoff, with the Kirov Opera (1998)
- The Kindness of Strangers – André Previn (1998)
- Valentina Igoshina plays Chopin (1999)
- The Strange Case of Delfina Potocka – Chopin, with Penelope Wilton (1999)
- Foreign Aids – Pieter-Dirk Uys on tour (2001)
- Ladies & Gentlemen, Miss Renée Fleming (2002)
- Hero – The Story of Bobby Moore – produced by David Frost (2002)
- Toward the Unknown Region – Malcolm Arnold. A Story of Survival (2003)
- John Osborne & The Gift of Friendship (2003)
- Ivry Gitlis & The Great Tradition (2004)
- The Adventures of Benjamin Schmid (2005)
- Margot – Margot Fonteyn (2005)
- The Salzburg Festival – A Brief History (2006)
- "O Thou Transcendent..." – The Life of Vaughan Williams (2007)
- The Wagner Family (The South Bank Show) (2009)
- Holst – In the Bleak Midwinter (2011)
- Falls the Shadow (2012)

== List of opera and theatre works ==
- Turandot – Puccini – Scottish Opera (1984)
- I Cavalieri di Ekebu – Zandonai – Krefeld (1985)
- Peter Grimes – Britten – Zurich (1989)
- West German premiere of Prokofiev's War and Peace – Karlsruhe (1990)
- The Trojans – Berlioz – Zurich (1990)
- Peter Grimes – Britten – Geneva (1991)
- Simone Boccanegra – Verdi – Hamburg (1991)
- La Forza del Destino – Verdi – Zurich (1991)
- Dimitrij – Dvořák – Munich (1992)
- Dialogues of the Carmelites – Poulenc – Augsburg (1994)
- Russian premiere of Parsifal – Wagner – Mariinsky/Kirov, St. Petersburg (1997) (Winner of The Golden Mask)
- Parsifal – Bolshoi, Moscow (1998) (Winner of the Casta Diva prize)
- Parsifal – Savonlinna (1998)
- Tristan und Isolde – Wagner – Ravello (1998)
- Die Walküre – Wagner – Ravello (1999)
- The Death of Klinghoffer – John Adams – Helsinki (2001)
- The Fair at Sorochyntsi – Mussorgsky – Bonn (2007)

== Books ==
- Born Under a Bad Sign (1970)
- The Trials of Oz (1971)
- Electric Revolution (1971)
- The Things I Love – Liberace (1976)
- All You Need Is Love (1976)
- Charles II: Portrait of an Age (1979)
- Julian Bream: A Life on the Road. London: Macdonald, 1982. ISBN 0-356-07880-9. Text by Palmer, photographs by Daniel Meadows.
- Menuhin: A Family Story (1991)
