= Rod de'Ath =

Welsh rock drummer of the 1970s

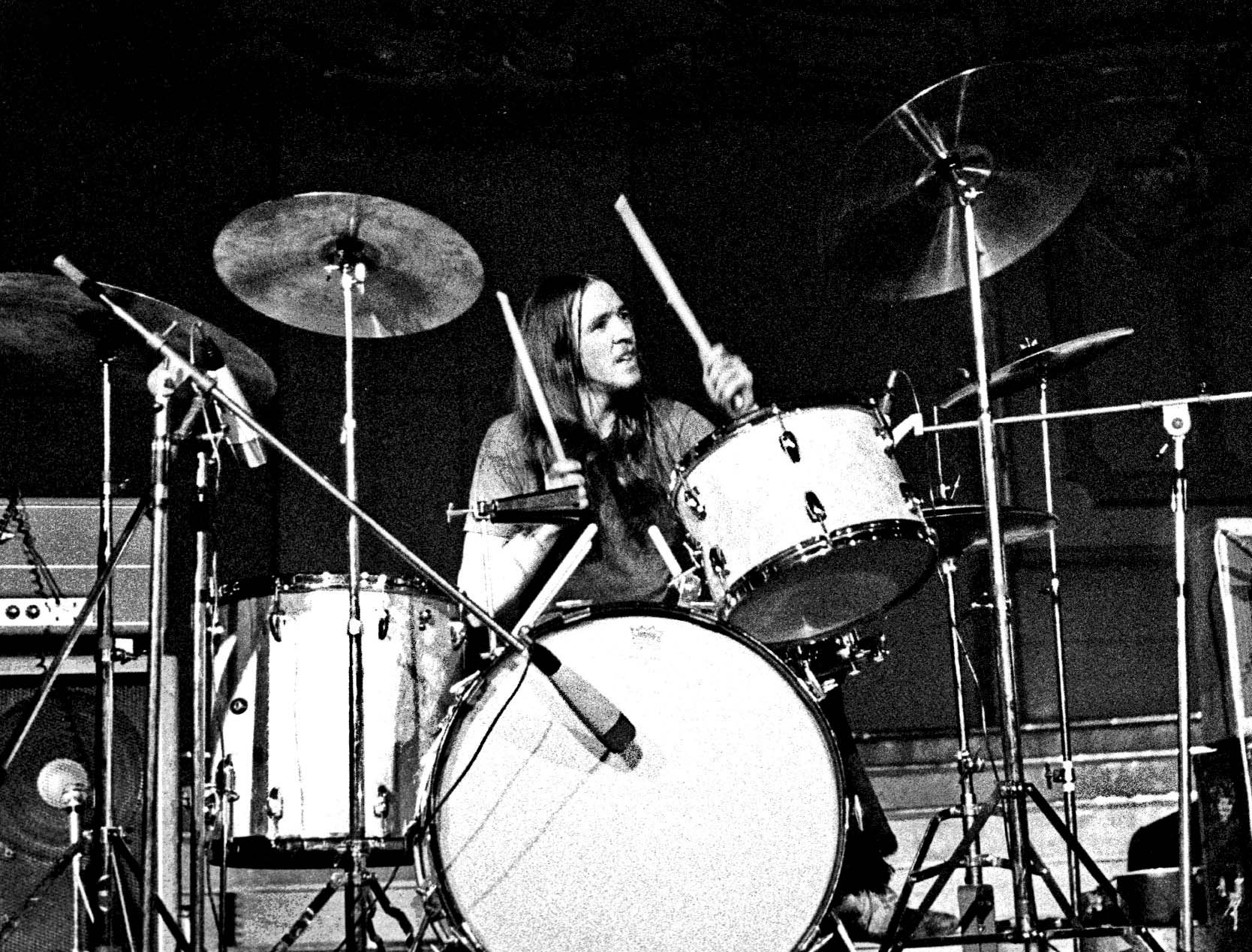
- De'Ath in 1973

Background information
- Birth name: Roderick Morris Buckenham de'Ath
- Born: 18 June 1950; Saundersfoot, Pembrokeshire, Wales
- Died: 1 August 2014 (aged 64); London, England
- Genres: Blues-rock; hard rock
- Occupations: Musician; producer
- Instrument: Drums
- Years active: 1969–1980s
- Labels: Polydor; Chrysalis

Roderick Morris Buckenham de'Ath (/diˈɑːt/; 18 June 1950 – 1 August 2014) was a Welsh musician, best known for his role as drummer with Irish guitarist Rory Gallagher in the 1970s.

== Career ==
=== With Rory Gallagher ===
De'Ath was playing with the band Killing Floor when, at short notice, he was offered the job as a temporary substitute for Rory Gallagher's drummer Wilgar Campbell for a leg of a European tour in 1972. When Campbell left permanently, de'Ath was asked to join full-time. He stayed with Gallagher, performing on several albums, until 1978 when he and keyboard player Lou Martin left the band. Gallagher's bass guitarist Gerry McAvoy stated that de'Ath "was the most undrummer-like drummer I ever played with. His technique was so strange that it added a whole new dimension to Rory's sound."

=== Later career and accident ===
After leaving Gallagher's band, de'Ath joined Ramrod (with Martin) and then he played with the Downliners Sect before moving to the United States. In 1981, he played on Screaming Lord Sutch's new recordings of All Black and Hairy and Jack the Ripper. In the mid-1980s, he returned to the UK to produce an album for a band called Road Erect. Around this time, he suffered a serious accident while running to catch a train, which led to the loss of one eye and some brain damage. Deciding to return to the UK permanently, he eventually made a near-complete recovery, although he was no longer able to play. He had also been told by doctors that his brain damage would kill him within four years, and although this prognosis proved incorrect, he did not want to contact friends only to tell them that he was terminally ill.

== Later life ==
When Gallagher died in 1995, many obituaries claimed that de'Ath was also dead, and for this reason he stayed away from Gallagher's funeral. McAvoy had heard that de'Ath had been killed in an accident in 1987. However, he appeared at a memorial service a few months later, having "waited for a suitable moment" to show that he was still alive. McAvoy remembered that de'Ath looked very frail and walked with the aid of a stick.

Little or nothing was known of de'Ath's whereabouts after 1996, until an interview with him was published in Classic Rock magazine in May 2012, within a feature about Rory Gallagher. A few months later in August, de'Ath attended the funeral of former Rory Gallagher and Ramrod band member Lou Martin.

== Death ==
De'Ath died in London on 1 August 2014, aged 64, after a long illness.

== Discography ==
=== With Rory Gallagher ===
- Blueprint (1973) Polydor
- Tattoo (1973) Polydor
- Irish Tour '74 (1974) Polydor
- Against the Grain (1975) Chrysalis
- Calling Card (1976) Chrysalis
- Notes from San Francisco (2011) Capo/Legacy/Eagle Rock (recorded 1977)
