= Blueprint (Rory Gallagher album) =

Studio album by Rory Gallagher
- Released: February 1973
- Recorded: December 1972
- Studio: Marquee Studios, London; Polydor Studios, London
- Genre: Blues rock
- Length: 43:23
- Label: Polydor 2383 189 (UK); Polydor 5522 (USA)
- Producer: Rory Gallagher

Rory Gallagher chronology
Live in Europe (1972)	Blueprint (1973)	Tattoo (1973)

Professional ratings
Review scores
Source	Rating
Allmusic	4/5 stars

Blueprint is the third studio album and fourth album overall by Irish guitarist Rory Gallagher, released as a vinyl record in 1973. It entered the UK album charts on 24 February, and reached No. 12. With his first band Taste and with his solo band up to this point Gallagher was one of the first guitarists to lead a power trio lineup. With Blueprint Gallagher included a keyboardist for the first time.

== Background ==
For Blueprint Gallagher replaced drummer Wilgar Campbell with Rod de'Ath and decided to add Lou Martin, the keyboardist from de'Ath's previous band Killing Floor. This four-piece lineup was to be one of Gallagher's most successful resulting in many of his most popular songs and documented in live film and TV appearances on shows such as Rockpalast and the Old Grey Whistle Test. The band would play together for five years. Blueprint, as with all the studio albums recorded by the Gallagher quartet illustrated Gallagher's eclectic musical influences.

The album title and artwork were taken from the blueprint of a Stramp "Power Baby" amplifier that had been custom designed for Gallagher in Hamburg. "It was compact enough to fit into the small luggage compartment of a Volkswagen Beetle" recalled Gallagher's brother and manager Donal.

== Track listing ==
All tracks composed by Rory Gallagher except where indicated.

Side one

1. "Walk on Hot Coals" – 7:04
2. "Daughter of the Everglades" – 6:14
3. "Banker's Blues" (Big Bill Broonzy) – 4:47
4. "Hands Off" – 4:32

Side two

1. "Race the Breeze" – 6:55
2. "Seventh Son of the Seventh Son" – 8:26
3. "Unmilitary Two-Step" – 2:50
4. "If I Had a Reason" – 4:31

CD bonus track

9. "Stompin' Ground (alt. version 10)" – 3:32
10. "Treat Her Right" (Roy Head) – 4:01

== Personnel ==
- Rory Gallagher – lead and rhythm guitars, harmonica, mandolin, saxophones, vocals
- Gerry McAvoy – bass guitar
- Lou Martin – keyboards, additional rhythm guitar
- Rod de'Ath – drums, percussion

Technical

- Phil Dunn – engineer
- Andrew Pearce – mastering
- Andy Stephens, Phil Dunne – engineer
- John Kosh – art direction
- Michael Putland – photography
- Tony Arnold – remastering
