= Isle of Wight Festival 2007 =

- Official Logo of Isle of Wight Festival 2007

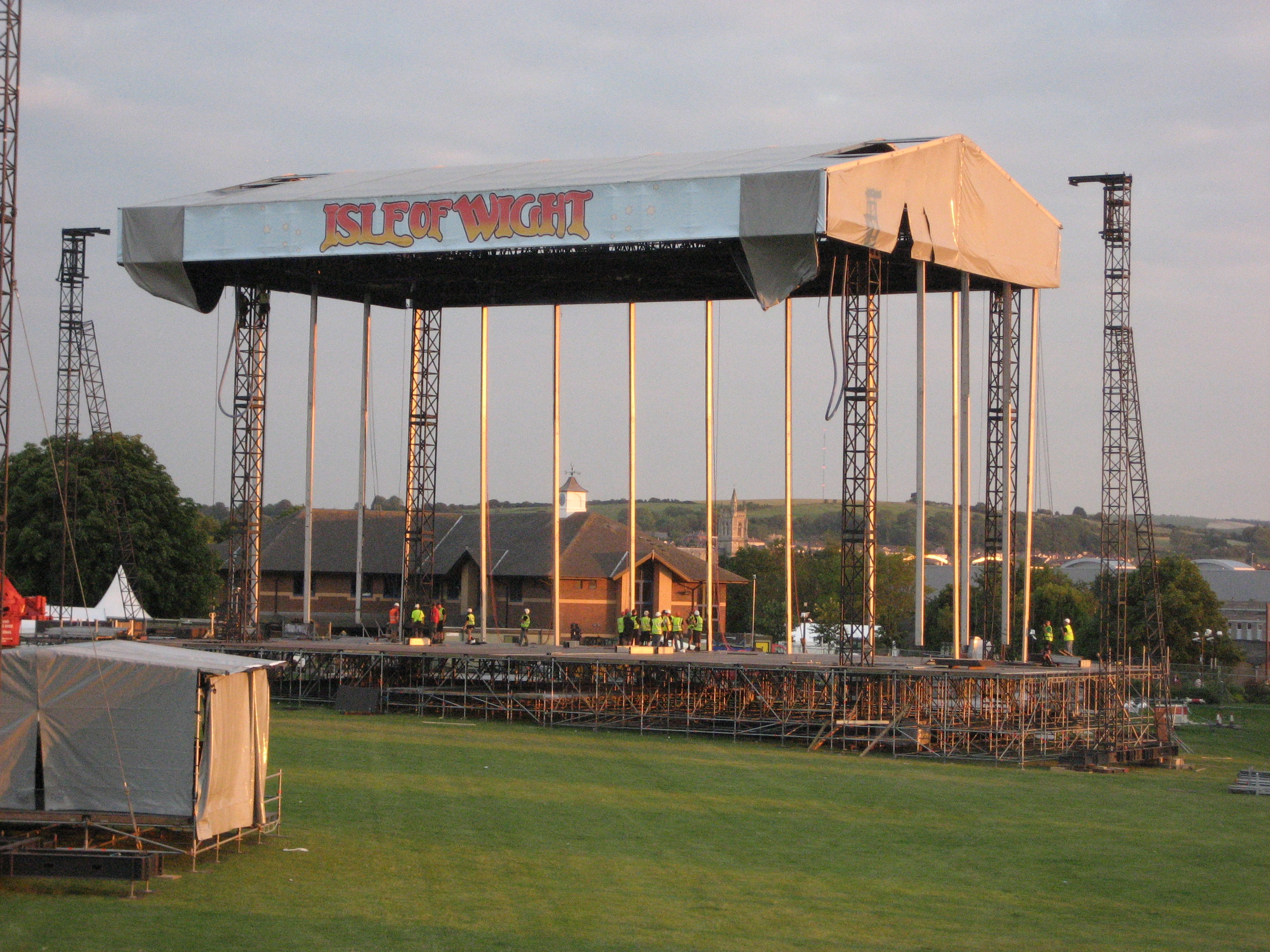
- Isle of Wight Festival 2007 stage under construction.
- Genre: Rock, pop
- Dates: 8–10 June 2007
- Locations: Seaclose Park, Newport, Isle of Wight, UK
- Website: Official website

The Isle of Wight Festival 2007 was the sixth revival of the Isle of Wight Festival on the Seaclose Park site in Newport, Isle of Wight. It took place between June 8 and June 10, 2007. It was the first festival since 2003 without an official sponsor.

The festival's capacity was approximately 60,000. Local artist Helen Davenport created a 15-foot (4.6-meter) tall illuminated statue made of wicker and tissue paper to commemorate the performance of Jimi Hendrix at the 1970 festival. The festival site was located next to a campsite in an extensive area of farmland.

The 2007 Festival sold out in record time, less than five days. The festival was The Rolling Stones' first British festival performance for over thirty years since their performance at the 1976 Knebworth Fair.

The Red Arrows performed a full-smoke aerial display on Saturday afternoon which some crowd members claimed was better than some acts.

The festival won the "Best Major Festival" award at the 2007 UK Festival Awards in London in November 2007. It beat stiff competition from Glastonbury Festival, T in the Park and Reading and Leeds Festivals. This success was followed by promoter John Giddings winning the "Outstanding Contribution to UK Festivals" award. In reaction to this, Glastonbury organizer, Michael Eavis, offered to present Giddings with the award personally.

== Highlights ==
- Part of the stage moved forward during a performance by the Rolling Stones.
- The Rolling Stones were joined on stage by Paolo Nutini and Amy Winehouse.
- The Feeling performed an energetic cover of The Buggles Video Killed the Radio Star to the delight of the crowd.
- Mick Jagger quipped while interacting with the crowd that the festival was somewhat of a non-event. Stating "The water costs two quid, the burgers four, and a dog ate my dope."
- There were pyrotechnic displays during the performance of Muse, particularly during the final song, "Take a Bow."
- Snow Patrol lead singer, Gary Lightbody interacted with spectators outside the festival site on the opposite bank of the River Medina, which resulted in "tongue-in-cheek" boos from the paying crowd.
- Country Joe McDonald managed to get the crowd chanting the profanity, "fuck," for a minute.
- The crowd continued to chant of "L.S.F." after Kasabian's set had finished.
- A full Red Arrows aerial display performed on Saturday afternoon was speculated by crowd members to be better than some acts.

== Line Up ==
=== Main stage ===
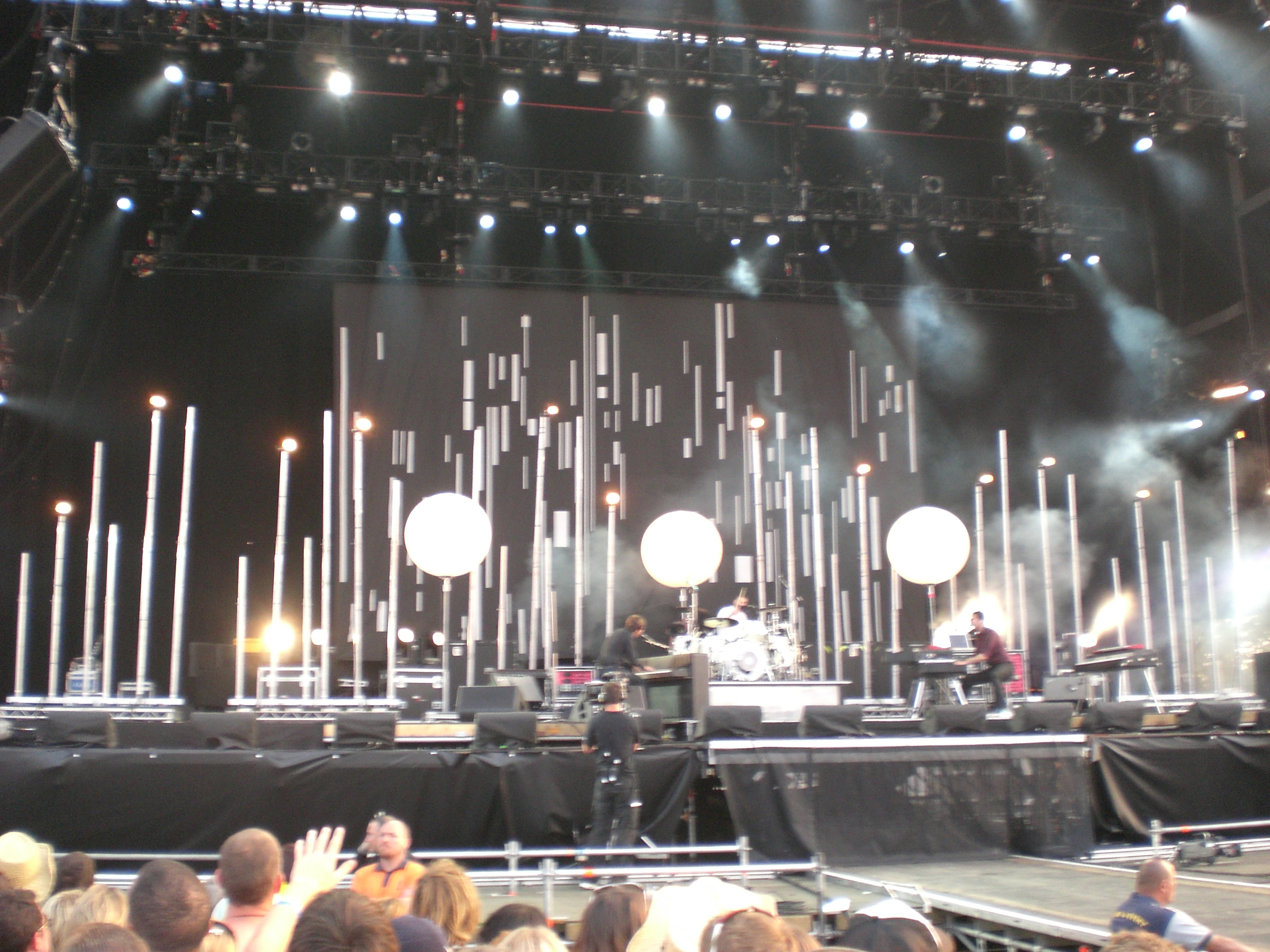
Keane.

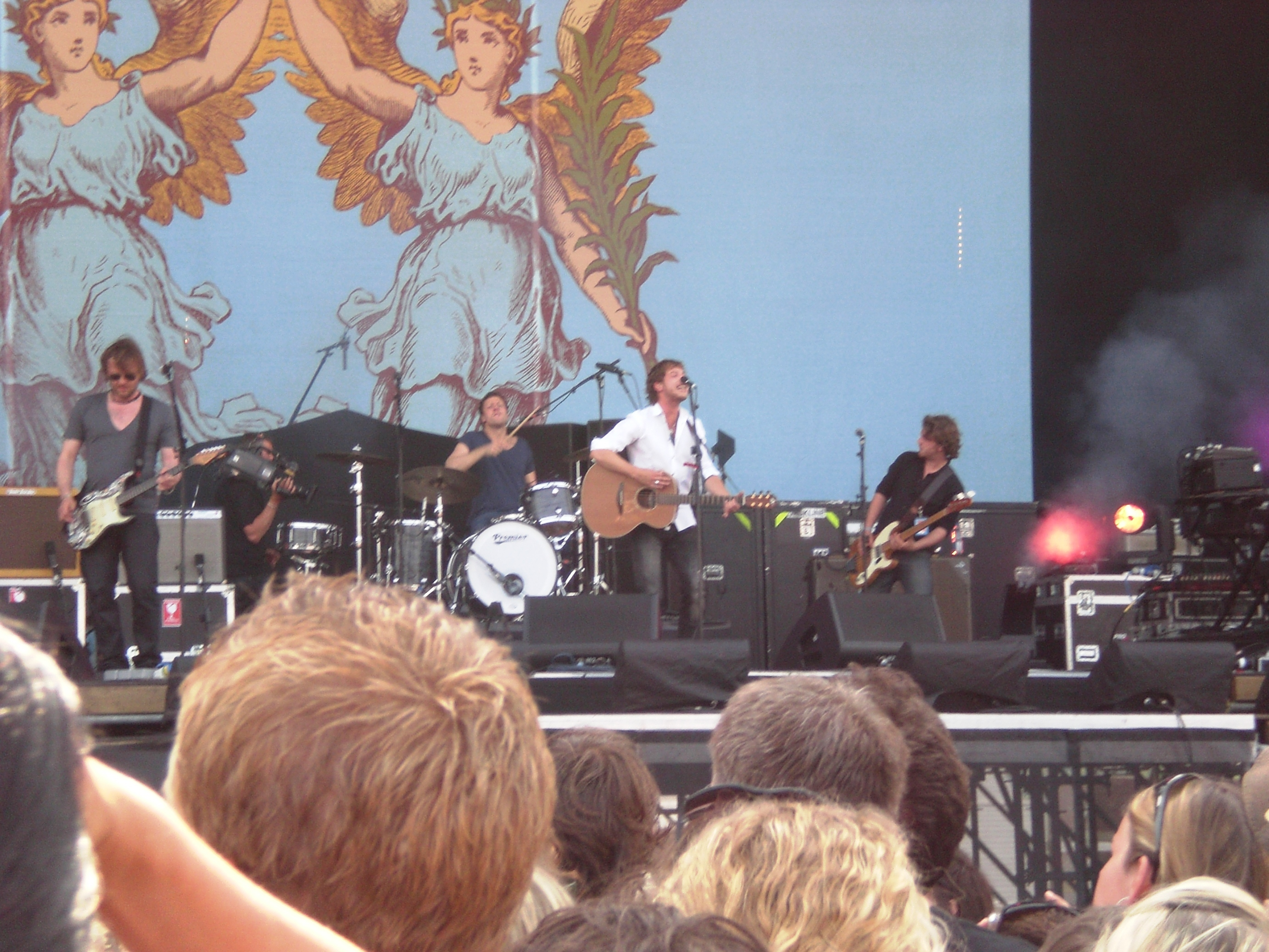
James Morrison.

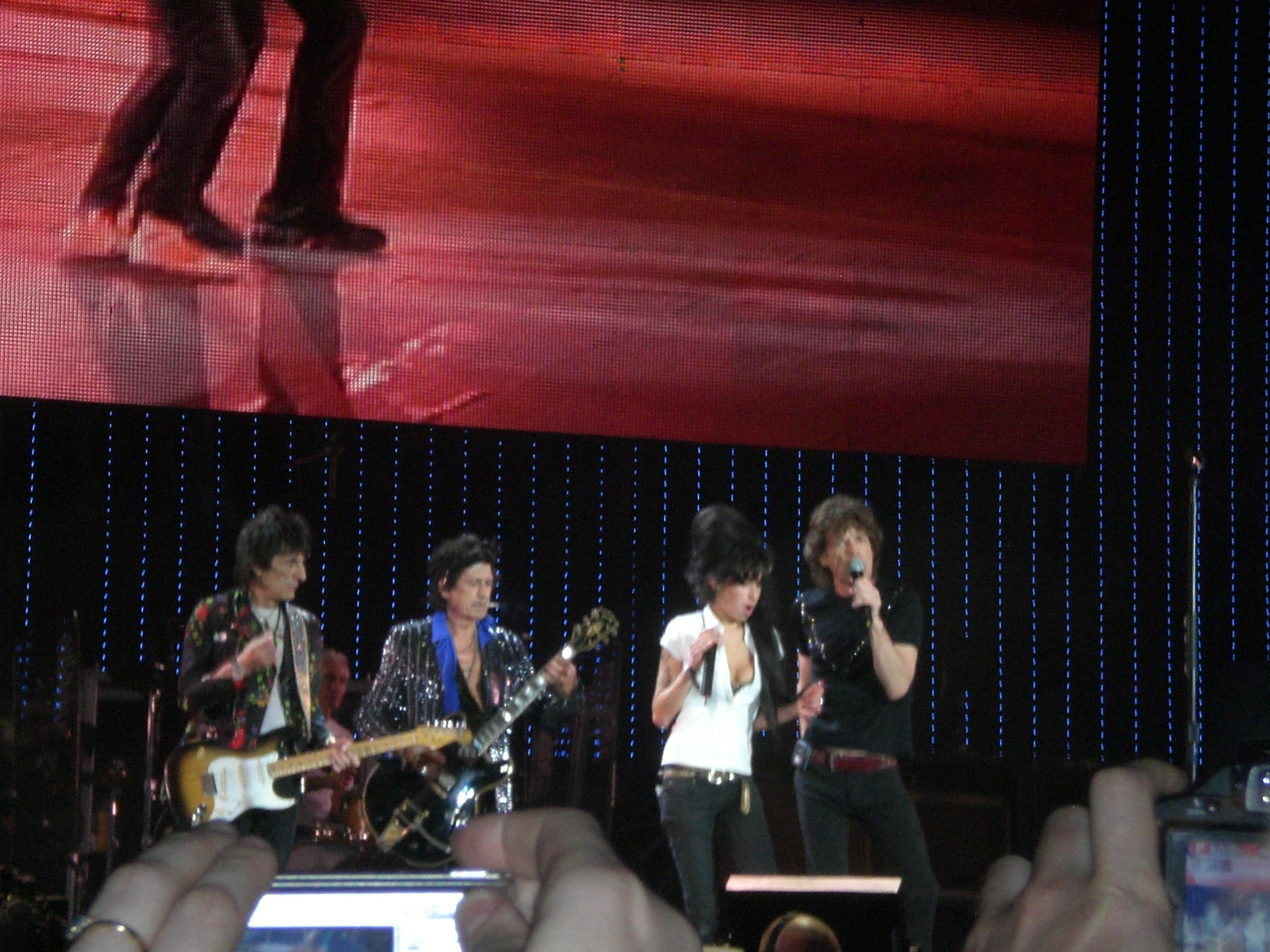
The Rolling Stones with Amy Winehouse.

Friday

- Snow Patrol
- Groove Armada as special guest.
- The Feeling
- Echo & the Bunnymen
- Koopa

Saturday

- Muse
- Kasabian as special guest.
- Ash
- Wolfmother
- Amy Winehouse
- Donovan
- Arno Carstens
- Carbon/Silicon
- The Thirst
- The Menschen

Sunday

- The Rolling Stones
- Keane as special guest.
- The Fratellis
- Paolo Nutini
- James Morrison
- Melanie C
- Country Joe McDonald
- The Hedrons
- Siniez

=== Strongbow Rooms ===
Strongbow Rooms is a tent and live music venue which tours many of the festivals in the United Kingdom. It made an appearance at the Isle Of Wight Festival with acts such as Annie Mac, Krafty Kuts and Shitdisco.

=== The Hipshaker Lounge ===
The Hipshaker Dance Lounge was open on the Thursday 7 June to entertain early camping ticket holders. It featured acts such as The Bees (band) & The Sails and two tribute bands of The Who and The Beatles respectively.

=== Bacardi B Live ===
The Bacardi B-Live opened to campers on Thursday 7 June providing music and refreshments. It featured acts such as DJ Norman Jay.

== Features ==
The Strawberry Fields area contained amongst others, the following attractions and features:

- The Strongbow Ciderhouse
- The Hipshaker Lounge
- Bacardi B-Live
- The Pussy Parlour
- The Bandstand
- The Kids Zone
- Babylon Bar
- The Zebra Champagne Bar

Other attractions included:

- Carling Cold Beer Amnesty - The festival once again featured the popular Carling Cold beer amnesty, in which people could trade warm beer for cold cans of Carling.
- The 'Solace' Tea And Cake Free Refreshment Tent
- A Funfair
- A Women's Institute Refreshment Tent

== Controversy ==
=== Pre festival controversy ===
There was some debate amongst the Isle of Wight Council members about whether to grant the Festival a licence, due to the numerous complaints and objections from local residents, mainly those living in Fairlee Road. Ultimately the Council approved the Festival for a maximum of 60,000 attendees. The Festival's future also came under considerable jeopardy as the Isle of Wight Council tried to enforce the Isle of Wight Act 1970, resulting in a £500,000 penalty on the organisers, Solo. The penalty was reduced however, and John Giddings stated that if the Island residents and councillors continued to create such problems for Solo, then the future of the Festival on the Island would be in doubt. John Giddings initially refused to issue Fairlee Road residents complimentary weekend tickets, as he had done in previous years; perhaps due to the aforementioned objections. However, in May, he granted free tickets to the residents, many of whom had already bought tickets, thus ending a controversial debate.

There was also some debate as to whether the RMT would grant a general strike on the Island over the Festival weekend. This would have rendered the Island's bus network virtually obsolete and would have left Festival-goers with logistical problems. However, the strike was cancelled and Southern Vectis bus services operated as normal.

Organisers Solo were accused of being ticket touts by the Island residents as the organisers auctioned 100 tickets to the highest bidder on eBay. Giddings replied to the statement claiming, "I have the right to do what I like, because it's my festival." He also suggested that if people were against this policy, then they should simply not buy tickets in this way. The notion of the organisers being touts represents a simplistic accusation by those who made the claim..

=== Post festival controversy ===
Many of the site security team were accused of being both heavy-handed and ineffective, to the point where one festival attendee was physically assaulted by security, resulting in a broken leg. There are claims of ejection from the site without due reason by some festival-goers. Others claim that security was absent in instances where they would have been able to assist, particularly in campsite disturbances and theft.
