= UK Festival Awards =

- Website type: Awards Ceremony
- Available in: English
- Website: http://www.festivalawards.com
- Launched: 2004

The UK Festival Awards are awarded annually, with various categories for all aspects of festivals that have taken place in the UK, and one category for European festivals. The Awards were first established in 2004 by Steve Jenner and his team at Virtual Festivals.com. They are voted for by the public via the UK Festival Awards website. To ensure fairness, the votes are weighted to take into account the event capacity.

The 2008 Awards ceremony was held on 30 October 2008 at the IndigO2 venue in London. Nordoff–Robbins music therapy will receive funds raised on the night.

The 2011 Awards ceremony was held at the Roundhouse in Camden, which remained its home until 2016.

Having grown beyond the original team's capacity to manage it as a part-time project, Mondiale Publishing was brought in as an acquiring partner in 2012, with Steve Jenner remaining onboard as a creative consultant.

Since 2017, to bring the Awards into closer alignment with flourishing Independent Festival sector, the UK Festival Awards have been held at Troxy, the music and events venue in Stepney, London.

== 2004 ==
UK Festival Awards launched as an online poll by VirtualFestivals.com, 12,000 fans vote. The awards are presented in person to the winners in their local pubs of choice

== 2005 ==
50,000+ fans vote; BBC 6 Music sign up as media partner. Saluted in Scottish Parliament when T in the Park is voted Best Major Festival. The awards are again presented to the winners in person during an epic road-trip spanning the UK.

== 2006 ==
Pressure from the industry prompts the creation of the first live event, for 500 standing-only at London’s Islington Academy, sponsored by Carling.

Hosted by: Steve Harris. Outstanding Contribution to Festivals: Melvin Benn (Festival Republic – Reading & Leeds, Latitude).

== 2007 ==
The first "sit down" event at KoKo, Camden. Michael Eavis attends.

Hosted by: the Cuban Brothers. Outstanding Contribution to Festivals: John Giddings (Isle of Wight).

== 2008 ==
Moves to the IndigO2, adding a gala dinner component (at the Goucho restaurant) and the first UK Festival Conference by day (oversubscribed).

Michael Eavis accepting his Outstanding Contribution to Festivals award at the IndigO2 in 2008. Establishes independent ownership as Festival Awards Ltd.

Hosted by: Shaun Keaveny. Outstanding Contribution to Festivals: Michael Eavis (Glastonbury).

=== 2008 Nominations Shortlist ===
- Best Major Festival
  - Creamfields
  - Download
  - Glastonbury Festival
  - Global Gathering
  - Isle of Wight Festival
  - Leeds Festival
  - Reading Festival
  - T in the Park
  - V Festival Chelmsford
  - V Festival Staffordshire
- Best Medium Sized Festival
  - Beautiful Days
  - Bestival
  - The Glade
  - Hydro Connect
  - Latitude
  - Lovebox Weekender
  - RockNess
  - The Big Chill
  - Wickerman Festival
  - Wakestock (Abersoch)
- Best Small Festival
  - 2000 Trees
  - Beach Break Live
  - Cambridge Folk Festival
  - End Of The Road Festival
  - Indie Track Festival
  - Larmer Tree Festival
  - Secret Garden Party
  - Standon Calling
  - Strummercamp
  - Summer Sundae Weekender
- Best Dance Festival
  - Creamfields
  - Dance Island
  - Escape Into The Park
  - The Glade
  - Global Gathering
  - Run To The Sun Festival
  - South West Four
  - Waveform Festival
- Best Lineup
  - Bestival
  - End of the Road Festival
  - Glastonbury Festival
  - Isle of Wight Festival
  - Latitude
  - Lovebox Weekender
  - Reading Festival
  - T in the Park
  - The Big Chill
  - V Festival Chelmsford
- Best New Festival
  - Beachdown Festival
  - Bearded Theory
  - Camp Bestival
  - Festibelly
  - Hop Farm Festival
  - Offset Festival
  - The Limetree Festival
  - The Magic Loungeabout
  - The Mighty Boosh Festival
  - Wakestock (Blenheim Palace)
- Grass Roots Festival
  - Beautiful Days
  - Belladrum Tartan Heart Festival
  - Big Session
  - End Of The Road Festival
  - Kendal Calling
  - Knockengorroach – World Ceilidh
  - Loopallu
  - Off The Tracks
  - Wickerman Festival
  - WOMAD
- Family Festival Award
  - Beautiful Days
  - Camp Bestival
  - Fairport's Cropredy Convention
  - Greenbelt
  - GuilFest
  - Larmer Tree Festival
  - Solfest
  - Summer Sundae Weekender
  - Weyfest
  - Wychwood Festival
- Best Toilets
  - Aeon Festival
  - Festinho
  - Greenbelt
  - Larmer Tree Festival
  - Nozstock
  - Secret Garden Party
  - Standon Calling
  - Strummercamp
  - The Big Chill
  - Y Not Festival
- Best European Festival
  - Castlepalooza (Ireland)
  - Creamfields Romania (Romania)
  - EXIT (Serbia)
  - Festival dello Stretto (Italy)
  - FIB Benicassim (Spain)
  - Gurtenfestival (Switzerland)
  - Heineken Open-er (Poland)
  - HOVE Festivalen (Norway)
  - Lowlands (Netherlands)
  - Open Air St. Gallen (Switzerland)
  - Oxegen (Ireland)
  - Roskilde (Denmark)
  - Snowbombing (Austria)
  - Spirit of Burgas (Bulgaria)
  - Tignes Fest (France)
- Festival Headline Act
  - Kings of Leon
  - Metallica
  - Muse
  - Rage Against the Machine
  - The Verve
- Festival Rock Act
  - Biffy Clyro
  - Bloc Party
  - Bullet for My Valentine
  - Elbow
  - The Raconteurs
- Festival Dance Act
  - Groove Armada
  - Hot Chip
  - Pendulum
  - The Chemical Brothers
  - The Prodigy
- Festival Pop Act
  - Duffy
  - Girls Aloud
  - Scouting for Girls
  - The Ting Tings
  - Will Young
- Festival Feel-Good Act
  - Eddy Grant
  - Neil Diamond
  - Seasick Steve
  - Tenacious D
  - The Mighty Boosh
- Festival Urban Act
  - Dizzee Rascal
  - Estelle
  - N*E*R*D
  - Roots Manuva
  - The Streets
- Best Live Newcomer
  - Duffy
  - Glasvegas
  - MGMT
  - The Ting Tings
  - Vampire Weekend
- Anthem Of The Summer
  - Dizzee Rascal featuring Calvin Harris - Dance wiv Me
  - MGMT - Time to Pretend
  - Noah and the Whale - 5 Years Time
  - The Ting Tings - That's Not My Name
  - The Verve - Love Is Noise
- Innovation Award
  - Beachdown: All shuttle-buses and official transportation ran on used cooking oil.
  - Glade Festival: Ticket scheme whereby festival goers were pre-sent an access card to swipe at the gate.
  - Glastonbury Festival: Biodegradable, starch tent pegs handed out to festival goers.
  - Hydro Connect: Rickshaws used to ferry festival goers and artists around the site.
  - Isle of Wight Festival: Wristbands distributed two weeks before the festival to speed up entry.
  - Latitude: Theatre Arena built upon the world's first fuel cell powered festival stage.
  - Lovebox Weekender: Real-time webcasts of artist interviews and performances on website and stage screens.
  - Solfest: Kids only toilets introduced to make things easier for children and adults alike.
  - Standon Calling: Hosted the UK's first festival underwater dance arena in a swimming pool.
  - The Big Chill: Big Issue vendors sold the programme on site, while buskers were invited to perform.
- Most Memorable Moment
  - British Sea Power, Arctic Monkeys and Klaxons hold impromptu collaboration at Sing Ye From The Hills.
  - Edwyn Collins makes moving comeback at Glastonbury following life-threatening illness.
  - Jay-Z mocks Noel Gallagher with his rendition of Wonderwall at Glastonbury.
  - Kasabian play up to dance fans with a cover of The Source's You Got the Love at Creamfields.
  - Kiss spit blood and 'fly over' Download fans, as thousands dress up as Gene Simmons.
  - Robert Plant joins Fairport Convention on stage at Cropredy Festival for Battle Of Evermore
  - Ross Noble leads a conga around the Latitude site, stealing fans from various stages
  - Secret Garden Party blow up their lake-marooned Pirate Ship in a firework spectacular.
  - The Specials and Grace Jones play secret back-to-back gigs at Bestival
  - Utah Saints break world record for most ever fans doing the 'Running Man' dance at Get Loaded In The Park.

== 2009 ==
The Awards returns to the O2 and the conference fills out into Europe’s largest cinema, the Vue in the O2 complex. The European Festival Awards is launched in partnership with The European Festival Association and debuts at The Grand Theatre in Groningen, Holland, on the opening night of Eurosonic Noorderslag.

Hosted by: Dixie and Horsey (Stars of ‘Svengali’). Lifetime Achievement Winner: Katrina Larkin (The Big Chill).

== 2010 ==
The Awards continues its O2 residency and the Conference expands again into sell-out event at the British Music Experience, covered live by BBC Business News.

=== 2010 Winners ===
- Best Toilets - T In The Park
- Best Metropolitan Festival - Gaymers Camden Crawl
- Best Family Festival in association with Showsec - Camp Bestival
- Best Breakthrough Artist in association with Rizla - Mumford & Sons
- Best Dance Event in association with Peppermint Bars - Creamfields
- Feel Good Act of the Summer in association with Be-at TV - Paolo Nutini
- Best New Festival in association with Access All Areas - Vintage At Goodwood
- Headline Performance of the Year in association with Jägermeister - AC/DC at Download Festival
- Virtual Festivals’ Critics Choice - Biffy Clyro at Glastonbury
- Overseas Festival - Snowbombing
- Anthem of the Summer in association with HMV - Florence & The Machine ‘You’ve Got The Love’
- Line-Up of the Year* in association with XL Video - Rockness
- Promoter of the Year in association with IQ - Glastonbury
- Best Small Festival in association with Doodson Entertainment - Kendal Calling
- Best Medium Festival in association with Smirnoff Flavours - Green Man
- Best Major Festival in association with Tuborg - Bestival
- Lifetime Achievement in association with Music Week – Geoff Ellis, DF Concerts
- Outstanding Contribution to Festival Production in association with TPi - Neil McDonald
- Best Sponsor Activation in association with Brand Republic - Coca-Cola
- The Grass Roots Festival Award in association with Robertson Taylor - 2000 Trees
- A Greener Festival Award in association with agreenerfestival.com - Croissant Neuf Summer Party

Hosted by: Craig Charles. Lifetime Achievement Winner: Geoff Ellis (T in the Park).

== 2011 ==
Awards show up-scales to The Roundhouse and sells-out – the founding dream realised. Conference moves up to The Forum, attracts record attendance.

Hosted by: The Cuban Brothers. Lifetime Achievement Winner: Steve Heap (Association of Folk Festivals).

http://www.festivalawards.com/2011-winners/

Best New Festival

Wilderness

Best Metropolitan Festival

Tramlines

Best Dance Event

Creamfields

Best Overseas Festival

Outlook (Croatia)

Best Family Festival

Beautiful Days

Best Breakthrough Artist

Ed Sheeran

Line-Up of the Year

Sonisphere Knebworth

Headline Performance of the Year

Paolo Nutini at Latitude

Anthem Of The Summer

Chase and Status: Blind Faith

Agent Of The Year

Steve Strange

Promoter Of The Year

Secret Productions

Best Small Festival

End of the Road

Best Medium-Sized Festival

Secret Garden Party

Best Major Festival

Glastonbury

Fans' Favourite Festival

Bestival

Lifetime Achievement Award

Steve Heap, Mrs Casey Music / Towersey Village Festival

PRESENTED AT THE UK FESTIVAL CONFERENCE:

Earlier in the day at The Forum, Kentish Town...

The Grass Roots Festival Award

Y-Not Festival

Concession Of The Year

The Beat Hotel

The Greener Festival Award

Shambala

Best Toilets

Y-Not Festival

Best Sponsor Activation

Capitalize: Bacardi

The Extra-Festival Activity Award

Bearded Kitten

Outstanding Contribution to Festival Production

The Event Safety Shop

== 2012 ==
Mondiale Publishing acquires a majority stake in the Awards which returns to The Roundhouse. Conference joins it at the same venue for the first time.

Hosted by: Phill Jupitus.

http://www.festivalawards.com/2012-winners/

Best New Festival

Festival Number 6

Best Metropolitan Festival

Camden Crawl

Best Dance Event

Global Gathering

Best Overseas Festival

Benicassim (Spain)

Best Family Festival

Latitude

Best Breakthrough Act

Jake Bugg

Line-Up of the Year

Download

Headline Performance of the Year

New Order at Festival Number 6

Anthem Of The Summer

Django Django – ‘Default’

Agency Of The Year

William Morris

Promoter Of The Year

Gareth Cooper (Festival Number 6, Beach Break Live, Lollibop, Snowbombing, Lounge On The Farm)

Best Small Festival

Y-Not

Best Medium-Sized Festival

Bloodstock Open-Air

Best Major Festival

Bestival

The Grass Roots Festival Award

Green Man

The Greener Festival Award

Croissant Neuf Summer Party

Concession Of The Year

Paelleria

Best Toilets

Lodestar

Best Brand Activation

The Southern Comfort Juke-Joint

The Extra-Festival Activity Award

Live From Jodrell Bank

Lifetime Achievement Award

John Probyn, Chief Operating Officer, Live Nation

== 2013 ==
Awards returns to The Roundhouse.

http://www.festivalawards.com/2013-winners/

BEST MAJOR FESTIVAL

Download

MEDIUM-SIZED FESTIVAL

Kendal Calling

BEST SMALL FESTIVAL

Bearded Theory

BEST NEW FESTIVAL

We Are FSTVL

BEST DANCE EVENT

Creamfields

BEST METROPOLITAN FESTIVAL

Dot To Dot

BEST FAMILY FESTIVAL

Camp Bestival

BEST GRASSROOTS EVENT

2000trees Festival

BEST TOILETS

ArcTanGent

BEST OVERSEAS FESTIVAL

Snowbombing (Austria)

HEADLINE PERFORMANCE OF THE YEAR

Arctic Monkeys – Glastonbury

ANTHEM OF THE SUMMER

Get Lucky – Daft Punk

BREAKTHROUGH ACT OF THE YEAR

Rudimental

Jury-decided Categories:

AGENT OF THE YEAR

CODA

BEST LINE-UP

Latitude

CONCESSION OF THE YEAR

Strumpets with Crumpets

THE GREENER FESTIVAL AWARD

Shambala Festival

BEST BRAND ACTIVATION

Virgin Media

THE EXTRA-FESTIVAL ACTIVITY AWARD

Wilderness

PROMOTER OF THE YEAR

Paddy Glasgow (Glasgowbury)

BEST USE OF NEW TECHNOLOGY

Barclaycard Presents British Summer Time (in Hyde Park) Intelligent Venue Solutions

THE OUTSTANDING ACHIEVEMENT AWARD

Fiona Stewart, Green Man Festival

== 2016 ==
Awards returns to The Roundhouse.

=== 2016 Finalists Shortlist ===
- Best Major Festival
  - British Summertime Hyde Park
  - Creamfields
  - Download Festival
  - Electric Daisy Carnival UK
  - Glastonbury Festival
  - Isle of Wight Festival
  - Reading & Leeds Festival
  - V Festival
  - Victorious Festival
  - Wireless Festival
- Best Medium-Sized Festival
  - Bestival
  - Beautiful Days
  - Bloodstock Open Air
  - Camp Bestival
  - Green Man Festival
  - Kendal Calling
  - Love Supreme Jazz Festival
  - The Social Festival
  - We Are FSTVL
  - Y Not Festival
- Best Small Festival
  - 3 Wishes Faery Fest
  - Acoustic Sundays Summer Sessions
  - Bearded Theory
  - Beats Cancer Music Festival
  - Breaking Bands Festival
  - Liverpool Music Week
  - Mammothfest
  - Northbridge Festival
  - The Secret Festival
  - Wildfire Adventure Camp

Best New Festival

  - 2Q Festival
  - A New Day Festival
  - Afropunk London
  - Big Family Festival
  - Bluedot
  - Joy Festival
  - Killin Music Festival
  - Neighbourhood Festival
  - OnRoundhay Festival
  - Positive Vibration – Festival of Reggae
  - Samphire Festival
  - The Bolton Weekender
- Best Dance Event
  - Beat Herder
  - Bluedot
  - Creamfields
  - Farr Festival
  - Field Maneuvers
  - Field Trip
  - Gottwood Festival
  - HogSozzle Music Festival
  - Junction 2
  - Nozstock: The Hidden Valley
  - The Social Festival
  - We Are FSTVL
- Best Metropolitan Festival
  - 2Q Festival
  - Blackpool Music Festival
  - Cheltenham Jazz Festival
  - Dot to Dot Festival
  - Grillstock
  - Just for Laughs London
  - Live at Leeds Festival
  - Liverpool Music Week
  - Liverpool Sound City
  - Mammothfest
  - Stockton Calling
  - Tramlines Festival
- Best Family Festival
  - 3 Wishes Faery Fest
  - Bearded Theory
  - Beermageddon
  - Big Family Festival
  - Camp Bestival
  - Green Man Festival
  - Just So Festival
  - Kendal Calling
  - Nozstock: The Hidden Valley
  - Something To Smile About
  - The Good Life Experience
  - The Secret Festival
- The Grass Roots Festival Award
  - 2000Trees
  - Balter Festival
  - Barn on the Farm
  - Beermageddon
  - Bloodstock Open Air
  - Green Man Festival
  - LeeFest Presents The Neverland
  - Lindisfarne Festival
  - New Forest Folk Festival
  - Samphire Festival
  - The Secret Festival
  - Wildfire Adventure Camp
- Headline Performance of the Year
  - American Football at ArcTanGent
  - Andy C at NASS
  - Calvin Harris at Creamfields
  - Elton John at Henley Festival
  - The Flaming Lips at Wilderness
  - Jean-Michel Jarre at Bluedot
  - LCD Soundsystem at Lovebox
  - Massive Attack at British Summertime Hyde Park
  - Refused at 2000Trees
  - Rihanna at V Festival
- Line-Up of the Year
  - ArcTanGent
  - Bloc
  - British Summertime Hyde Park
  - End of the Road Festival
  - Green Man Festival
  - Liverpool Music Week
  - Simple Things Festival
  - Slam Dunk Festival
  - The Social Festival
  - WOMAD
- Best Overseas Festival
  - Altitude Comedy Festival
  - Bestival Toronto
  - Blues in Hell
  - Castlepalooza
  - Dimensions Festival
  - Download Paris
  - Electric Elephant
  - EXIT Festival
  - Hideout Festival
  - Gibraltar World Music Festival
  - Snowbombing
  - SXM Festival
