= Isle of Wight Festival 2008 =

Music festival on the Isle of Wight, England

- Genre: rock, pop
- Dates: 13–15 June 2008
- Locations: Seaclose Park, Newport, Isle of Wight, UK
- Website: Official website

The Isle of Wight Festival 2008 was the seventh revived Isle of Wight Festival held at Seaclose Park in Newport on the Isle of Wight. The event took place between 13–15 June 2008.

Tickets went on sale in December 2007 and were sold out within weeks.

This year was the first time that the festival was screened live on TV. After four years of highlights packages being broadcast on Channel 4, this year ITV announced that they had won the rights to broadcast live on ITV2. There were live programmes on each of the three days; starting at 11:00pm on Friday, Saturday and Sunday and contain mainly highlights of the days performances, along with live coverage of the headliners' sets.

== Line up ==
=== Main stage ===
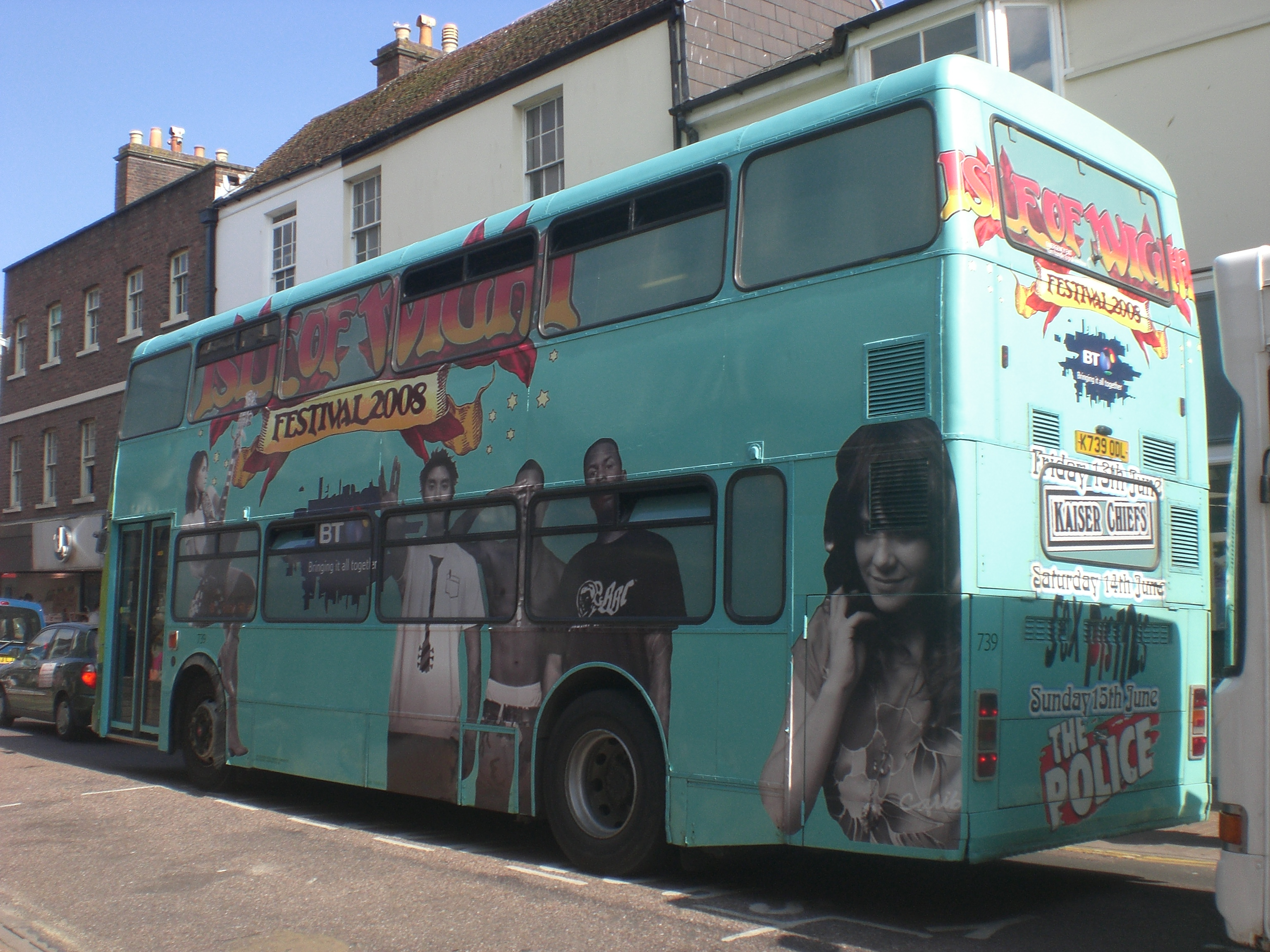
An Island-based Southern Vectis bus featured complete all over advertising for the Isle of Wight Festival in 2008.

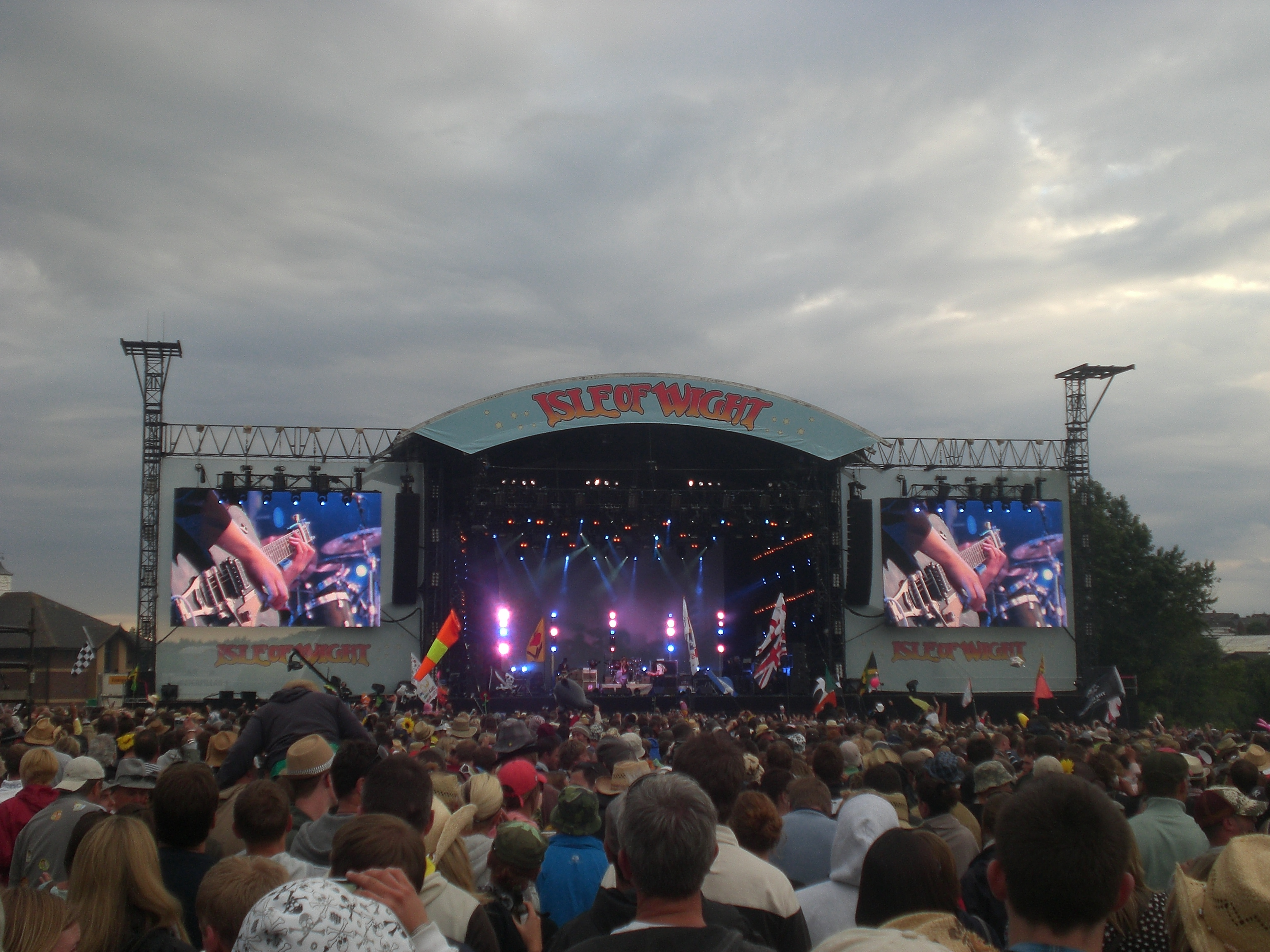
The main stage for the Isle of Wight Festival on Sunday.

Friday

- Kaiser Chiefs
- N.E.R.D as special guest.
- KT Tunstall
- The Hoosiers
- The Wombats
- Joe Lean and the Jing Jang Jong
- The Answer

Saturday

- Sex Pistols
- Ian Brown as special guest.
- Iggy & The Stooges
- The Zutons
- The Enemy
- Kate Nash
- The Cribs
- Amy Macdonald
- One Night Only
- Black Stone Cherry
- Kosmik Debris

Sunday

- The Police
- The Kooks as special guest.
- James
- Starsailor
- Scouting For Girls
- Newton Faulkner
- Delays
- We See Lights
- Proximity Effect

=== The Big Top ===
Thursday (campers only)

- Björn Again
- Suspiciously Elvis

Friday

- The Stranglers
- Curved Air
- The Duke Spirit
- Arno Carstens

Saturday

- Sugababes
- The Australian Pink Floyd Show
- Arno Carstens
- Stone Gods

Sunday

- Feeder
- New Young Pony Club
- The Music
- Arno Carstens

Appearing over the weekend, in the Big Top were Stone Gods and New Young Pony Club, amongst other acts.
