= Blag, Steal & Borrow =

Blag, Steal & Borrow may refer to:

- Blag, Steal & Borrow (album), an album by Koopa
- "Blag, Steal & Borrow" (song), an album by Koopa
