= Isle of Wight Festival 2003 =

Festival in England

- Genre: rock, pop
- Dates: 14–15 June 2003
- Locations: Seaclose Park, Newport, Isle of Wight, UK
- Website: isleofwightfestival.com

The Isle of Wight Festival 2003 was the second revived Isle of Wight Festival to take place on the Seaclose Park site in Newport on the Isle of Wight. It was the first to take place on the second weekend in June, which would be then set as the Festival's annual date.

A follow-up to Rock Island 2002, the event was taken over by promoters 'Solo' and was thus the first curated by John Giddings. Attendance was around 14,000.

== Line-up ==
=== Main stage ===
Saturday	Sunday
Paul Weller; Starsailor; Iggy Pop; John Squire; The Cooper Temple Clause; The Thrills; The Burn	Bryan Adams; Counting Crows; Hell is for Heroes; The Darkness; The Raveonettes; The Basement; Jimmy's Big Fish

Starsailor was the first band to return to the revived festival. They would appear again in 2005 and 2008.

Weekend Tickets cost £50.
