= Wakestock =

Wakestock may refer to:

- Wakestock (Canada)
- Wakestock (Wales)

== See also ==
- Wakestock 2008, in Wales
