= Ditto Music =

Online music distribution company

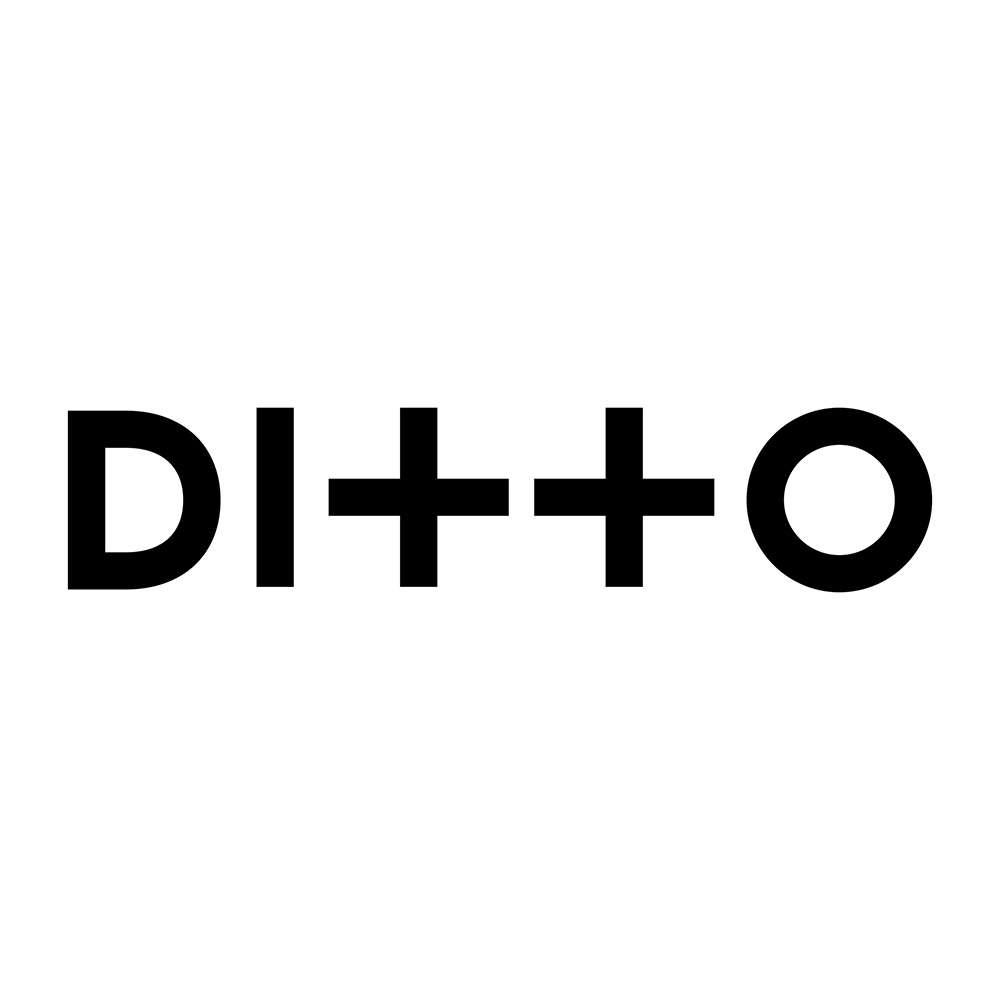
- Company type: Private
- Industry: Music
- Genre: Online distribution, Record label
- Founded: 2005
- Founder: Lee Parsons, Matt Parsons
- Headquarters: Liverpool, United Kingdom
- Area served: Worldwide
- Key people: Lee Parsons; Matt Parsons
- Products: Record Label Services, Online Delivery (Music)
- Services: Record Label Services and On-demand music distribution
- Number of employees: 103
- Website: Ditto Music Website

Ditto Music is an online music distribution company. It distributes music to over 150 digital music stores, including Spotify, YouTube, Apple Music, TikTok, Meta Platforms, Audiomack, SoundCloud and Beatport. It currently operates from its head office in Liverpool, England. And, as of 2025, it has 20 offices across 15 countries.

== History ==
In January 2007, Ditto Music distributed "Blag, Steal & Borrow" by Essex band Koopa, which entered into the UK Top 40, making it the first chart hit by an unsigned band, this achievement is in the Guinness Book Of World Records

== Services ==
Ditto's main distribution service offers unlimited releases to all major online stores on an annual subscription basis. The company claims to operate non-exclusive deals with artists, keeping 100% of their royalty earnings.

Alongside its core music distribution service, Ditto Music also offers record label services, including PR, social media, and playlist pitching to independent artists. In 2021, Ditto added music publishing to its range of services for artists.

== Awards and nominations ==
Won the RECSS Customer Support Award in 2011 for 'Best Online Service Provider.

Nominated for Best Distribution Team at the Music Week Awards in 2013.

Nominated for Best Label/Artist Services Company at the Music Week Awards in 2017 and 2018.

Named on The Sunday Times Fast Track 100 list of Britain's fastest-growing companies in 2017 and SME Export Track 100 in 2018.
