= We See Lights =

Scottish band

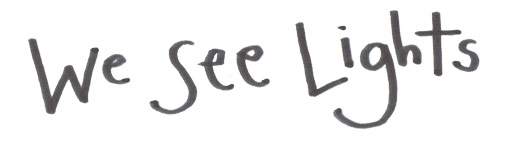
- We See Lights band logo

Background information
- Origin: Edinburgh, Scotland
- Genres: Indie
- Years active: 2007–present
- Members: Stephen Bogle; Paul Dougall; Allan Rae; Ross Harvie; Paul Livingstone; Kat Oatey; Robert Purdie; Jonathan Lapsley
- Website: Official page on Facebook

We See Lights is a Scottish alternative indie pop band from Edinburgh, Scotland.

== Career ==
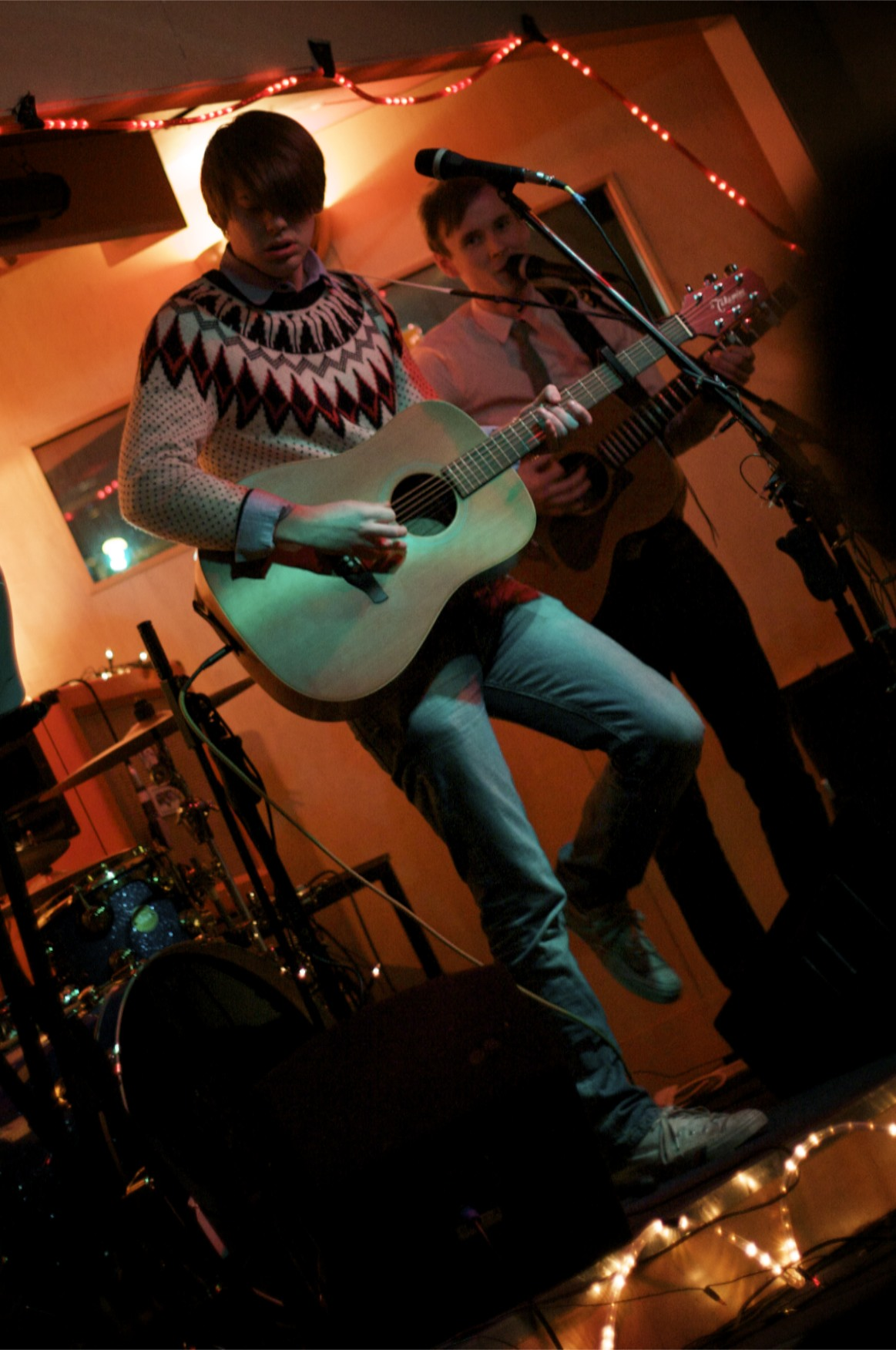
We See Lights performing at Christmas Songwriters' Club night at the Leith Dockers Club in 2009.

The band was started by Stephen James Bogle (vocals and guitar), Paul Dougall (vocals and guitar) and Allan Rae (vocal and guitar) in 2007. The band were originally called the Quiet Revolution. The Quiet Revolution gained members in January 2008 (Craig Ross on (bass/guitar), Ross Harvey (drums), Ciaran McGuigan (vocals) and Jonathan Lapsley (keyboard/vocals)) and soon became We See Lights. Ciaran McGuigan and Craig Ross left the band in March 2009. Paul Livingstone (bass) joined the band in January 2010.

The band recorded their first EP with Edinburgh producer Ric Rograss of the Depot Recording Studios. We See Lights played their first show at the Cabaret Voltaire on 24 January 2008. Some of the members of We See Lights were involved in establishing the Christmas Songwriters Club in 2008. In 2008, We See Lights won the BT National Battle of the Bands, securing a main stage slot at the Isle of Wight Festival 2008 that year playing alongside The Police, The Kooks and James. In November 2008, the band received funding from the Scottish Arts Council (now known as Creative Scotland) to record their debut album, Ghosts & Monsters. The album was recording in a cottage near Fort William, Chem19 in Hamilton and the Depot in Edinburgh with Ric Rograss. The album was released in March 2010.

We See Lights have gone on to become a well established member of the indie folk scene in Scotland. They have played alongside Ra Ra Riot, Eugene McGuinness, Plants & Animals, Frightened Rabbit, Coast, Iain Archer and We Were Promised Jetpacks. They have also played the Wychwood Festival, T in the Park, the Isle of Wight Festival, the PRS stage at the Edinburgh Festival, the Edge Festival, Canadian Music Week, GoNorth, RockNess, the Solas Festival, and the Heb Celt Festival.

In March 2011, the band released their EP Twee Love Pop on Edinburgh indie label Heroes and Gluepots. It received support from DJ's such as Lauren Laverne who played the track "My Oh My Oh My" on her BBC Radio 6 Music Show on 8 April 2011. The band also did a session on BBC Radio Nan Gaidheal show "Rapal on 15 August 2011, featuring songs from the EP. In May 2012, the band released a single from their forthcoming album, the latter of which is yet to be released. In an interview given in December 2012, band member Allan Rae suggested the album was nearing completion and would be entitled 'Bloody Twenties'. In July 2013, the band also confirmed that they had featured on John D McIntosh's debut EP entitled You + Me =. On 31 March 2015, the band released their second album, Throw Your Arms Around Someone, You Will Each Weigh a Little Less. The release was followed by a series of videos which the band uploaded to their YouTube channel, including a re-mixed version of "Run Away My Love" by the Edinburgh-based band, Homework.

== Discography ==
=== LPs ===
- Ghosts & Monsters (2010)
- Throw Your Arms Around Someone, You Will Each Weigh a Little Less (2015)

=== EPs ===
- We See Lights (2008)
- Snow In The Sand And Sky (2009)
- Twee Love Pop (2011)

=== Singles ===
- "Hopeless at Maths" (2012)
- "I Hope You Like the Smiths" / "My Oh My Oh My" (2011)
- "Parachute" (2009)
