= IQ (magazine) =

Magazine about Music Industry

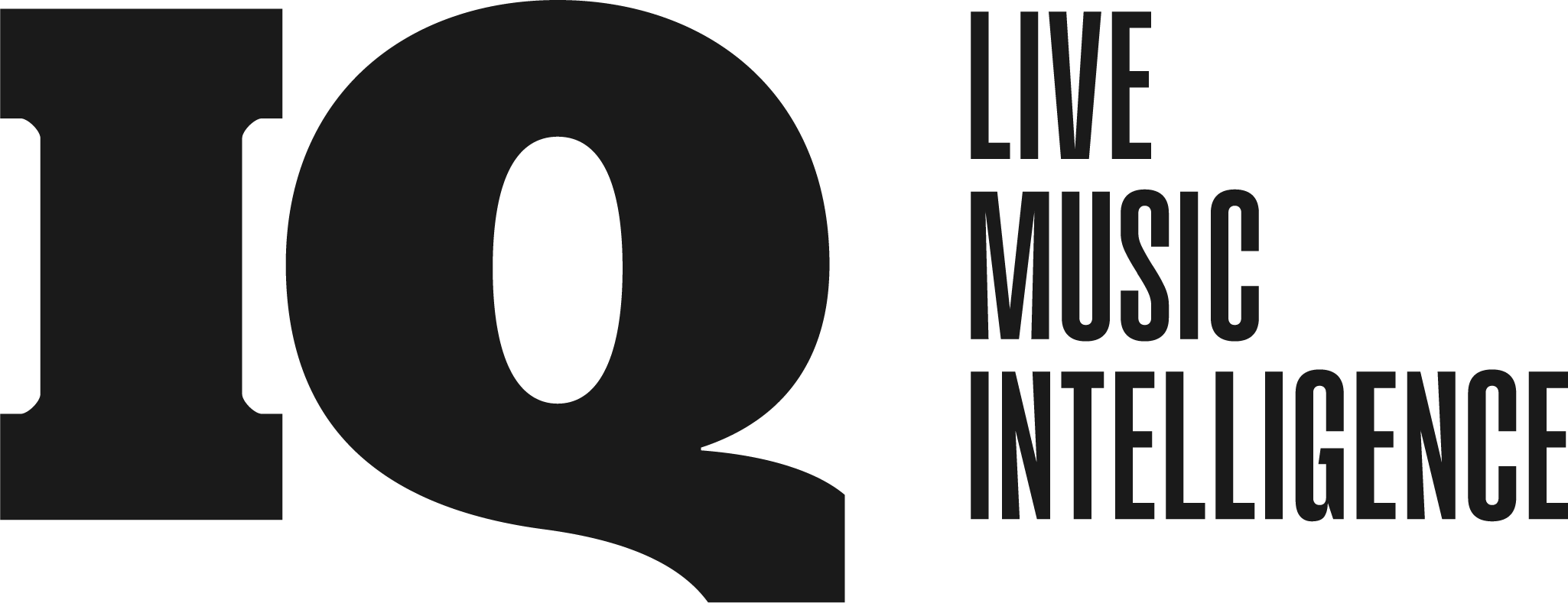
- Editor: James Drury
- News Editor: Ciaran Donnelly
- Assistant Editor: Lisa Henderson
- Former Editors: Gordon Masson, Greg Parmley, Allan McGowan
- Former News Editors: James Hanley, Jon Chapple
- Categories: Trade magazine
- Frequency: 8 issues per year
- Format: Print magazine & news website
- Publisher: Suspicious Marketing
- Founded: 2004
- First issue: Q4 2004
- Company: ILMC
- Country: United Kingdom
- Based in: London
- Language: English
- Website: iqmagazine.com
- ISSN: 2633-0636

IQ is a news platform for the international live music industry. Its readership of more than 100,000 professionals a month comprises live music professionals, including concert promoters, booking agents, festival organisers, artist managers and venue operators, in more than 60 countries.

IQ comprises a regular print & digital magazine, several annual reports and daily news, insight and analysis. The IQ family also includes two annual conferences: ILMC, the live music industry's largest international gathering, and the International Festival Forum (IFF).

== History and profile ==
IQ Magazine was established in late 2004 as the journal of the International Live Music Conference (ILMC), the leading annual gathering of professionals working in live music and entertainment, and originally stood for ILMC Quarterly. The magazine is now published on a bimonthly basis, while its website is updated daily.

In print and online, IQ presents industry updates, news analysis and features to both conference delegates and the industry at large. Its articles have been cited by Forbes, the NME, the Evening Standard, Complete Music Update, Resident Advisor, Pollstar and the Mayor of London.

== ILMC and IFF ==
ILMC began in 1989, and was the first dedicated gathering of leading figures in the global concert industry. More than 3,000 people attended the most recent conference, ILMC 38, at the Royal Lancaster Hotel in London in February 2026. Previous ILMC speakers include Michael Rapino, Arthur Fogel, Marc Geiger, Herman Schueremans, Peter Mensch and Paul McGuinness, and artists such as Roger Daltrey, Dua Lipa and Nick Mason.

IFF, which launched in 2015, is an invitation-only networking event for music festivals and booking agents.

== The Arthur Awards ==
The conference is also home to an annual awards ceremony, the Arthur Awards, which honours live music professionals and companies. Previous winners include Harvey Goldsmith, John Giddings, the Royal Albert Hall, The O2 Arena, Adele agent Lucy Dickins, CTS Eventim, Michael Chugg, Rock Werchter and Glastonbury Festival.
