= Larmer Tree Festival line-ups =

Music and arts festival

The Larmer Tree Festival near Tollard Royal on the Wiltshire–Dorset border is a music and arts festival which has taken place annually since 1990. There are several different stages and areas, and many diverse forms of music, performance (including comedy acts and street theatre) and workshops can be found on site.

== 2019 line-up ==
The 2019 edition took place on 19 to 21 July.

Friday	Saturday	Sunday
The Cat Empire; The Shires; Kokoroko; Jade Bird; Blick Bassy; Let's Eat Grandma; Melt Yourself Down; Flamingods; J.S. Ondara; Hejira; Curse of Lono; Kioko; Olly Olsson; Bella, Polly & the Magpies; Saronde; Bash!; Sorry About Shaun; Gaz Brookfield	Kae Tempest; Gomez; GoGo Penguin; Cymande; Benjamin Francis Leftwich; London Astrobeat Orchestra; The Wave Pictures; Dizraeli; Circus Brothers; Jerry Williams; Holy Moly & The Crackers; Funke and the Two Tone Baby; True Strays; DJ Max Galactic	~~Jack Savoretti~~ Tom Odell; KT Tunstall; Ezra Collective; Tank and the Bangas; Lisa O'Neill; B.C. Camplight; Iris Gold; Didirri; Ferris & Sylvester; Jeramiah Ferrari; Night Flight; Ren Harvieu; Tide Lines; Worry Dolls

== 2008 line-up ==
The festival ran from Wednesday 12 July to Sunday 16 July 2008.

Wednesday	Thursday	Friday	Saturday	Sunday
Jools Holland and his Rhythm & Blues Orchestra with special guest Marc Almond; Eric Bibb; Roads; Wille and The Bandits; DJ Connie	The Levellers; Bellowhead; SixNationState; Park Bench Social Club; The Sables; Wille and The Bandits; Black Bart; Perico with The Paper Cinema; Boy Le Monti; Michael Wookey; Andrea Soler; Glowglobes; The Hats; Mary Spender; Sixfifteen; Alex Roberts; DJ Imbo; Rafiki; Deano Ferrino; DJ Guy C; DJ Connie	Orchestra Baobab; Dengue Fever; Terne Čhave; Agnostic Mountain Gospel Choir; 3 Daft Monkeys; The Destroyers; Hey Negrita; Rory Ellis; Ash Grunwald; Park Bench Social Club; Dan Arborise; 6 Day Riot; Yes Sir Boss!!!; No 1 Station; Bad Science; Bizali; The Family; Carnival Collective; Glitzy Bag Hags; Shisha Sound System; Alice Watts; Chris Woodford; DJ Connie	Taraf de Haïdouks; Kora; Kanda Bongo Man; Think of One; Devon Sproule; Terne Čhave; Son Of Dave; Foy Vance; The Royal Rahri Chhou Dancers; LaXula; Jackie Leven; Ruarri Joseph; Ash Grunwald; Rachel Harrington; Hijak Oscar; Dan Arborise; Ruth Notman; Jeff Lang; Mankala; The Dodge Brothers; 12 Stone Toddler; Dr Joel; Hobo Jones & The Junkyard Dogs; Mama Feel Good!; Tangawizi; DJ Berts; Different Drummer Sound System; DJ Connie	Tinariwen; Seth Lakeman; Kate Rusby; Julie Fowlis; Bedouin Jerry Can Band; Justin Adams & Juldeh Camara; Mor Karbasi; Elizabeth Cook; Martin Harley Band; Nathan 'Flutebox' Lee; Smerins Anti-Social Club; Nuala & The Alchemy Quartet; Dennis Hopper Choppers; Rachel Harrington; Moon Music Orchestra; Dogan Mehmet; The Don Bradmans; Pronghorn; Samsara; The Legendary DJ Derek; The Accidental; DJ Robin & Pablo Rider; Mr Muz; DJ Cheeba; DJ Yoshi; DJ Connie

== 2007 line-up ==
The festival ran from Wednesday 11 July to Sunday 15 July 2007.

Wednesday	Thursday	Friday	Saturday	Sunday
Jools Holland and his Rhythm & Blues Orchestra with special guest Lulu; Show of Hands	Courtney Pine; Billy Bragg; Balkan Beat Box; 12 Stone Toddler; Ozomatli		Dreadzone; Los De Abajo	Go Lem System

== 2006 line-up ==
The festival ran from Wednesday 12 July to Sunday 16 July 2006.

Wednesday	Thursday	Friday	Saturday	Sunday
Jools Holland and his Rhythm & Blues Orchestra	Kate Rusby; Afro Celt Sound System; The Ukulele Orchestra of Great Britain; Le Cod Afrique	Dreadzone; Seth Lakeman; Larry Love Showband; Son of Dave	Shooglenifty; Jazz Jamaica Motorcity Roots; King Creosote; Stacey Earle & Mark Stuart; Holly Golightly; Sambasunda	The Be Good Tanyas; Trilok Gurtu & the Misra Brothers; Bellowhead; OKI Dub Ainu Band; Ska Cubano; Rajasthani Folk Musicians and Dance

== 2003 line-up ==
The festival ran from Thursday 17 July to Sunday 20 July 2003.

Thursday	Friday	Saturday	Sunday
	Shooglenifty; Eleyo (Cuba); Valerie Smith & Liberty Pike (USA); Cantaloop; Derrin Nauendorf & David Downing (Australia); The Ruffness; Beltaine; The Huckleberries; 3 Daft Monkeys; Roads; Farther; Chris George; DJ Phil Meadley; DJ Connie's Voodoo Kitchen		Wai (NZ); Pape & Cheikh (Senegal); Ron Sexsmith (Canada); Oi Va Voi; Croft No Five; Jackie Leven; Soothsayers; La Sonera Calaveras; David Ogilvy; Jelitara Futa (Senegal); Pronghorn; Gina Dootson; Kangaroo Half Moon; Ben Gunstone; Sirius B; The Hudson Quartet; DJ Chris Pedley; DJ Phil Meadley; DJ Connie's Voodoo Kitchen
