= Rock Island 2002 =

Music event held in 2002 on the Isle of Wight

Coordinates: 50.706°N 1.291°W

Rock Island: The Isle of Wight Festival
- Rock Island poster, listing some of the artists playing on the day
- Genre: rock, pop
- Dates: 3 June 2002
- Locations: Seaclose Park, Newport, Isle of Wight, UK
- Website: Official website

Rock Island was the first revived Isle of Wight Festival to take place on the Seaclose Park site in Newport on the Isle of Wight. It was a one-day event held on 3 June 2002, almost thirty-two years after the previous festival. The event had a capacity of 22,000, however only around 8 to 10,000 attended. Local band Neglected Youth won the right to open the concert in a recent talent contest, a tradition that would be continued throughout subsequent years of the festival. Limited camping facilities were also made available on fields nearby.

It is notable that this Festival took place on the same day as the Party at the Palace.

== Line-up ==
=== Main Stage ===
Monday
- The Charlatans
- Robert Plant
- Starsailor
- Ash
- Hundred Reasons
- The Coral
- The Bees
- DNA Doll
- Johnny 4
- Neglected Youth

Day tickets cost £35.
