= The Road (Mike + The Mechanics album) =

Studio album by Mike + The Mechanics
- Released: 18 April 2011
- Recorded: 2009–10
- Studio: Fisher Lane Farm Studios (Chiddingfold, England); Churchfield Studio (London, UK); Tree House Studios (Cape Town, South Africa)
- Genre: Pop rock
- Length: 46:00
- Label: Arista, Sony
- Producer: Mike Rutherford; Christopher Neil; Graham Stack

Mike + The Mechanics chronology
Rewired (2004)	The Road (2011)	Let Me Fly (2017)

Singles from Mike + The Mechanics
- 1. "Reach Out (Touch the Sun)" Released: 2011; 2. "Try to Save Me" Released: 2011

Professional ratings
Review scores
Source	Rating
Allmusic	3/5 stars

The Road is the seventh studio album by Mike + The Mechanics, released in 2011 by Sony Music. This was their first album to feature an entirely new lineup, retaining only Mike Rutherford.

Following the release of Rewired in 2004 and the supporting tour, the group stopped working. In 2009, rumours surfaced that Mike Rutherford had plans to resurrect the band and had begun working on a new album. It was reported that Andrew Roachford would become the new singer. Soon after, two other names were mentioned: Arno Carstens and Tim Howar. Early sessions produced the songs "Background Noise", "It Only Hurts for a While" and "Hunt You Down", with Carstens performing vocals.

The sessions continued through 2010. By the end of 2010, it was officially announced that Rutherford, Roachford and Howar had recorded a new Mechanics album. The rest of the band consisted of drummer Gary Wallis, guitarist Anthony Drennan and keyboard player Luke Juby.

The album was reissued in 2017 by the band's current label BMG (former owner of Arista).

== Track listing ==
No.	Title	Writer(s)	Producer(s)	Length
1.	"The Road"	Christopher Neil, Mike Rutherford, Martin Sutton	Neil, Rutherford	4:20
2.	"Reach Out (Touch the Sun)"	Jamie Norton, Andrew Roachford, Rutherford, Benjamin Weaver	Rutherford, Graham Stack	4:03
3.	"Try to Save Me"	Neil, Roachford, Rutherford	Neil, Rutherford	3:47
4.	"Background Noise"	Arno Carstens, Neil, Rutherford	Neil, Rutherford	4:15
5.	"I Don't Do Love"	Tim Howar, Neil, Roachford, Rutherford	Neil, Rutherford	4:34
6.	"Heaven Doesn't Care"	Neil, Rutherford, Sutton	Neil, Rutherford	3:37
7.	"It Only Hurts for a While"	Carstens, Neil, Rutherford	Neil, Rutherford	4:09
8.	"Walking on Water"	Norton, Roachford, Rutherford, Weaver	Rutherford, Stack	3:41
9.	"Hunt You Down"	Carstens, Neil, Rutherford	Neil, Rutherford	3:44
10.	"Oh No"	Howar, Neil, Rutherford	Neil, Rutherford	4:17
11.	"You Can Be the Rock"	Neil, Roachford, Rutherford	Neil, Rutherford	5:17
Total length:				46:00

== Personnel ==
Mike and The Mechanics

- Mike Rutherford – electric guitars, bass guitar, programming, backing vocals
- Tim Howar – lead vocals (6, 10), backing vocals
- Andrew Roachford – lead vocals (1–3, 5, 8, 11), backing vocals
- Luke Juby – keyboards
- Anthony Drennan – electric guitars
- Gary Wallis – drums

Additional personnel

- Pete Adams – Hammond organ
- Toby Chapman – keyboards
- Jamie Norton – keyboards (2, 8)
- George Hewlett – organ (9)
- Martin Sutton – programming, electric guitars
- Ben Robins – programming (3, 10)
- Harry Rutherford – programming, backing noises, drums (4, 9)
- Ben Weaver – electric guitars (2), bass guitar (8)
- Jamie Moses – electric guitars (3)
- Hugo Flower – guitars (9)
- Arno Carstens – lead vocals (4, 7, 9), backing noises
- Beverley Brown – backing vocals
- Hazel Fernandez – backing vocals
- Christopher Neil – backing vocals
- Mary Pearce – backing vocals
- Barrow Hills School Choir – backing vocals (6)

== Production ==
- Mike Rutherford – producer
- Christopher Neil – producer (1, 3–7, 9–11)
- Graham Stack – producer for Metrophonic Productions (2, 8)
- Harry Rutherford – engineer, mixing
- Dick Beetham – mastering at 360 Mastering (London, UK)
- Greg Jakobek – design
- Patrick "Paddy" Balls – photography
- Carsten Windhorst – photography
- Tony Smith – management

== Charts ==
Chart (2011)	Peak position
German Albums (Offizielle Top 100)	41
Scottish Albums (Official Charts)	48
Swiss Albums (Schweizer Hitparade)	64
UK Albums (Official Charts)	42
