= Larmer Tree Festival =

Annual music festival in Wiltshire, England

Coordinates: 50°57′6.82″N 2°4′59.86″W

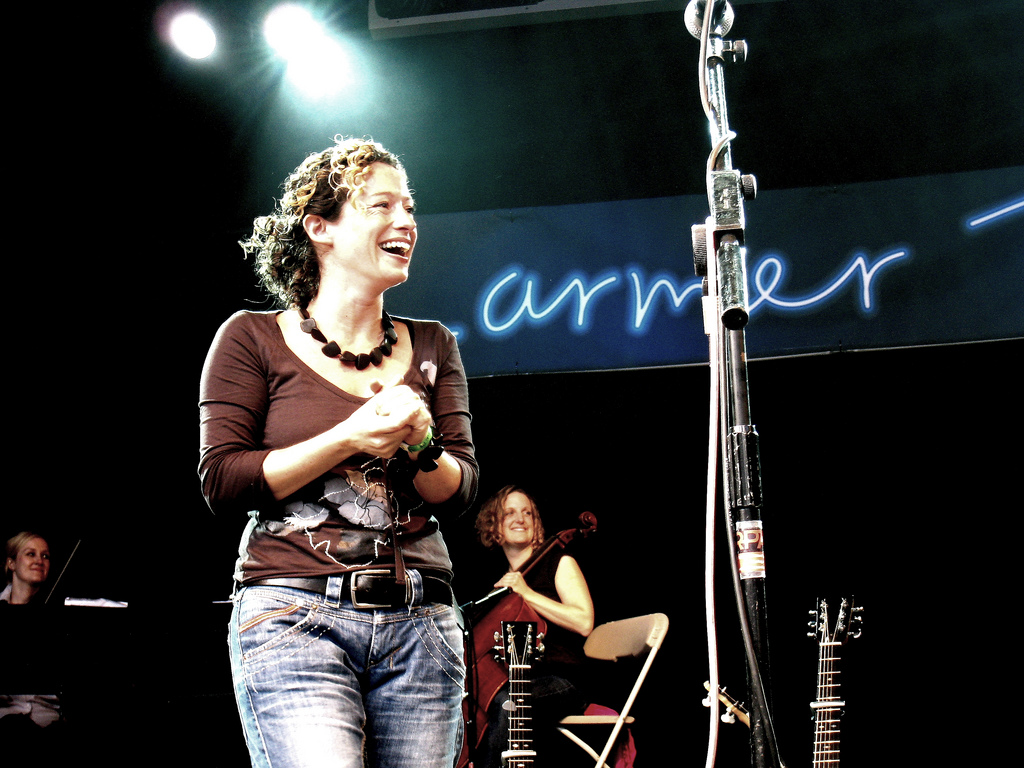
- Kate Rusby at the Larmer Tree Festival 2008
- Genre: Rock and pop, reggae, folk, acoustic, world, jazz, comedy, family, theatre, talks, workshops, arts and crafts
- Dates: Annually in July
- Locations: Larmer Tree Gardens, near Tollard Royal, Wiltshire, England
- Years active: 1990 – 2019
- Founders: James Shepard
- Website: larmertreefestival.co.uk

Larmer Tree Festival was a three-day music, comedy and arts festival held annually from 1990 until 2019 at the Larmer Tree Gardens, near Tollard Royal on the Wiltshire-Dorset border in England. The 2020 festival was cancelled as a result of the COVID-19 pandemic, and the event was not held in 2021, 2022 or 2023.

Performers included Paloma Faith, Jake Bugg, First Aid Kit, Tom Odell, KT Tunstall, Tom Jones, Kae Tempest, Jools Holland and Gomez.

== Location ==
The festival was held in the Larmer Tree Gardens, a Victorian pleasure ground created by landowner Augustus Pitt Rivers. It had a capacity of 5000 audience members per day.

The Larmer Tree itself was an ancient landmark tree on the ancient boundary between Wiltshire and Dorset. The setting has lawns and gardens, dotted with Indian pavilions and Roman temples, with free-roaming peacocks and macaws, which also featured in much of the festival's branding.

== Organization ==
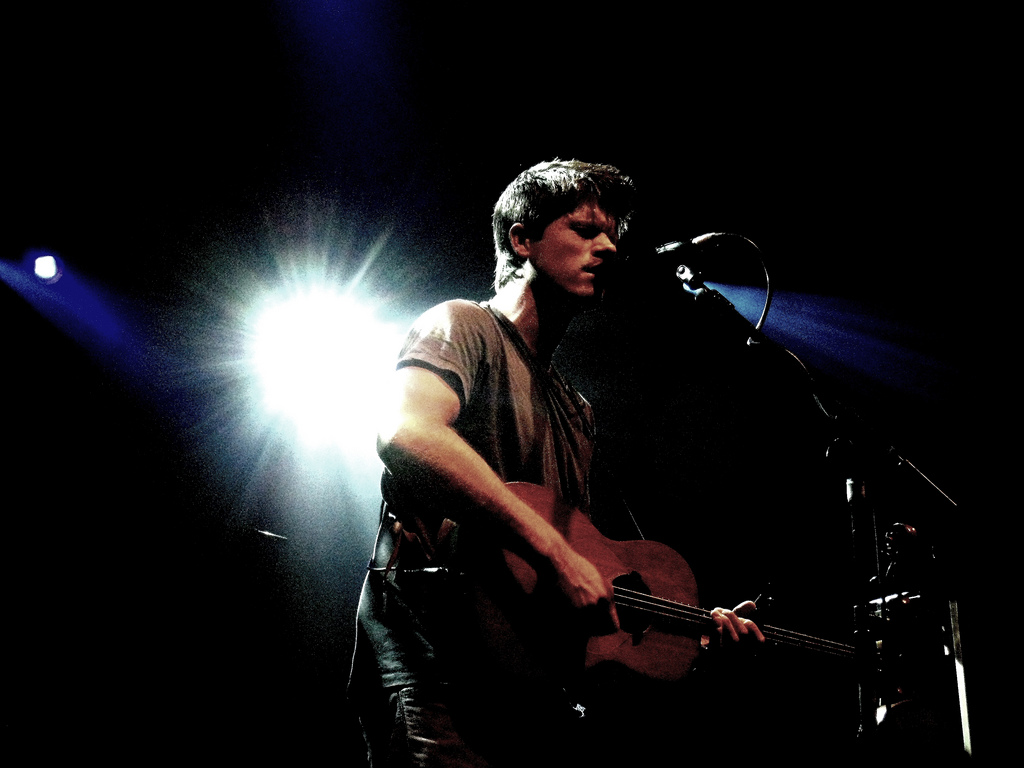
Seth Lakeman at the Larmer Tree Festival 2008

The first festival was held in 1990, founded by James Shepard, who was joined in 1993 by Julia Safe. Rob Challice joined as director in 2015, having previously managed the festival's music programming.

Following the 2018 festival, James Shepard and Julia Safe stepped down as directors. Rob Challice continued in his role, joined by new directors Lauren Down and James Strathallan.

Nearly 500 volunteers from the local area, covering 13 different roles, help out before, during and after the event, and it has links with many local organisations.

The festival organisers tried to minimise its environmental impact, by such measures as recycling as much as possible and insisting on the use of biodegradable trays and wooden cutlery by the catering outlets at the event. They also encouraged festival-goers to take measures such as lift-sharing by signing up to GoCarShare or Freewheelers, recycling, and saving water on site.

== Events ==
See Larmer Tree Festival line-ups for line-up listings.

The music performances took place on four stages – Main Stage, Peacock Palace, The Social and Village Inn. The festival predominately featured acoustic folk, indie-rock, jazz, country-folk, world music, reggae, roots and blues, plus the Late Night Larmer programme which included DJs and disco beats. The Village Inn hosted swing, ska and skiffle performances.

Comedy performers at the Festival included Josie Long, Mark Watson, Dylan Moran, Sara Pascoe and Nish Kumar, new comers, Edinburgh Festival Fringe previews and live podcast recordings.

The COVID-19 pandemic caused the cancellation of the 2020 event, and it was not held in 2021, 2022 Or 2023. In late 2021 the organisers blamed COVID-related disruption to suppliers and contractors, and potential financial risks.

== Facilities ==
The festival offered a number of boutique camping options from traditional Gypsy-style caravans to well-furnished Bell Tents. There were several campsites including Quiet Camping, Family Camping, General Camping, Accessible Camping, Day Camping, and the Van Field with a panoramic views of the Cranborne Chase. The campsite next to the festival ground was free, with free hot showers. In 2006 the festival toilets won the UK Festival Awards 2006 Portaloo Sunset Award For Best Toilets.

== Awards ==
In 2008 the Larmer Tree Festival was nominated for five awards by UK Festival Awards: Best Small Festival (for festivals of 10,000 festival-goers or less); Best Lineup; Grass Roots Festival Award (for "the king of anti-commercialism"); Family Festival Award and Best Toilets. The festival made the shortlist in three categories: Best Small Festival, Family Festival Award and Best Toilets, and won the Family Festival Award when the results were announced at the awards ceremony in London on 30 October 2008.
