= Arno Carstens =

South African musician

- Born: Arno Carstens; 12 March 1972 (age 54); Cape Town, South Africa
- Genre: Alternative rock
- Occupation: Musician
- Instruments: Vocals; guitar
- Years active: 1994–present
- Labels: Arno Carstens; Gallo; Sony
- Member of: Springbok Nude Girls
- Website: owl.link/arnocarstens.btc; thearnocarstensstore.com

Arno Carstens (born 12 March 1972) is a South African musician and fine artist.

Arno Carstens Fine Art
- Style: Surrealism; portraiture; contemporary art
- Movement: Expressionism; digital art
- Spouse: Melanie Carstens (m. 2007)
- Children: Hayden Carstens (b. 2012)
- Website: owl.link/arnocarstens.btc; thearnocarstensstore.com

== Career ==
Arno Carstens is a fine artist and platinum selling, award-winning singer-songwriter based in Cape Town, South Africa.

During his career as the lead singer of The Springbok Nude Girls, and subsequently as a solo artist; Arno has released multiple albums, spawned a string of successful singles & received numerous awards including Best Rock Album, Best Alternative Album & Song of the Year.

Arno has headlined every major South African music festival, performed at the Isle of Wight Festival, Glastonbury, V Festival, T in the Park and Hard Rock Calling. He has also toured with The Rolling Stones, U2, Bryan Ferry, Simple Minds, Ultravox, Paulo Nutini and The Police. Arno features as lead vocalist and co-writer on three tracks on the Mike + The Mechanics 2011 album The Road.

Arno continues to tour and release new music.

=== Fine art ===
Over the years, Arno’s passion for all things art has continued to overflow. In 2007 he began working with his first love, oil on canvas. His first solo fine art exhibition was in 2012 at The Lovell Gallery in Woodstock His artwork now sells internationally from his online store or through pop up art and live music events which are hosted by him on a regular basis. He has collaborated with celebrated artists, Beezy Bailey and the late Barend de Wet. Arno is also a digital artist, represented by the Bitcoin Art Collective.

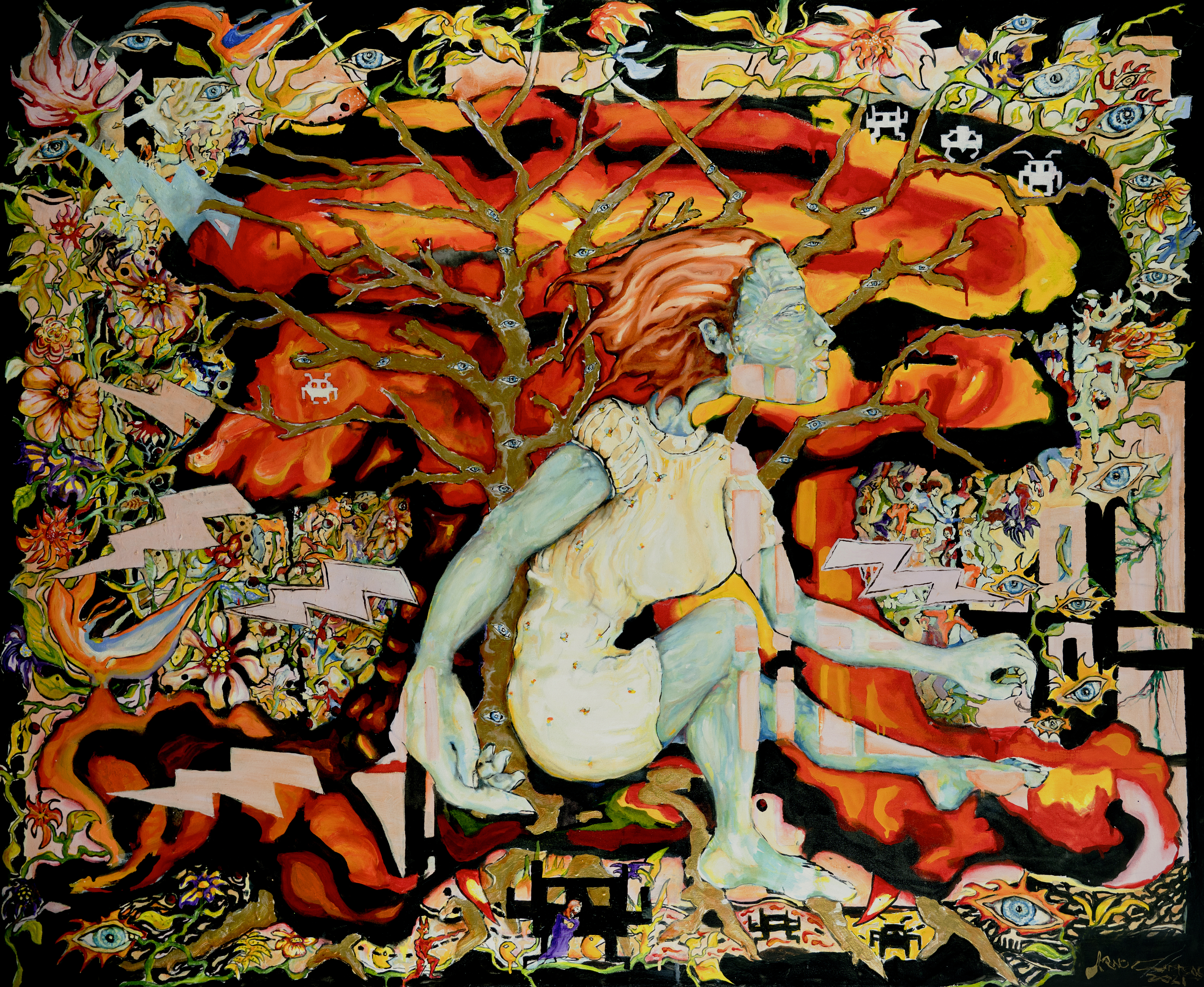
Arno Carstens - Samsara, oil on canvas, 2017

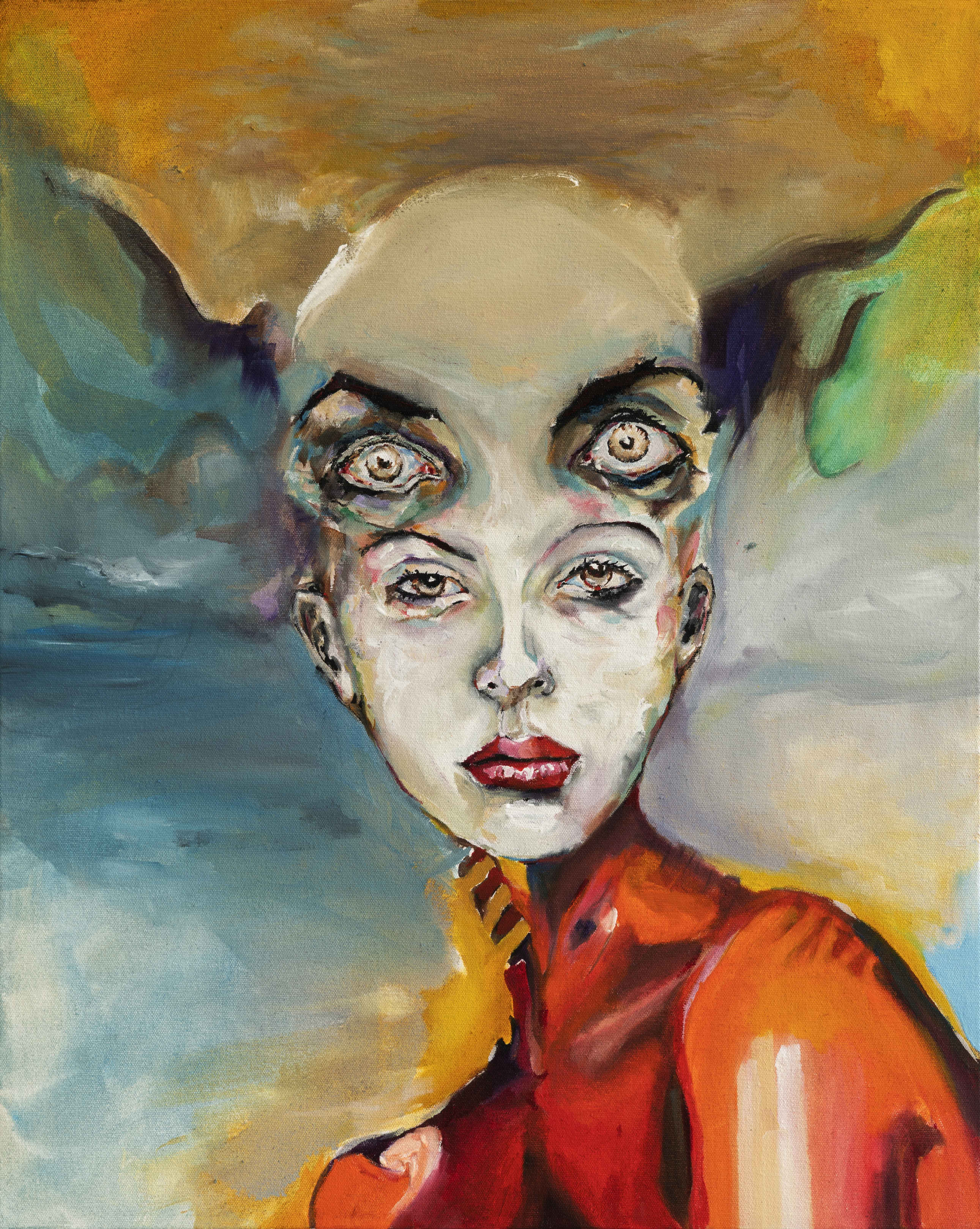
Arno Carstens - Polar, oil on canvas, 2022

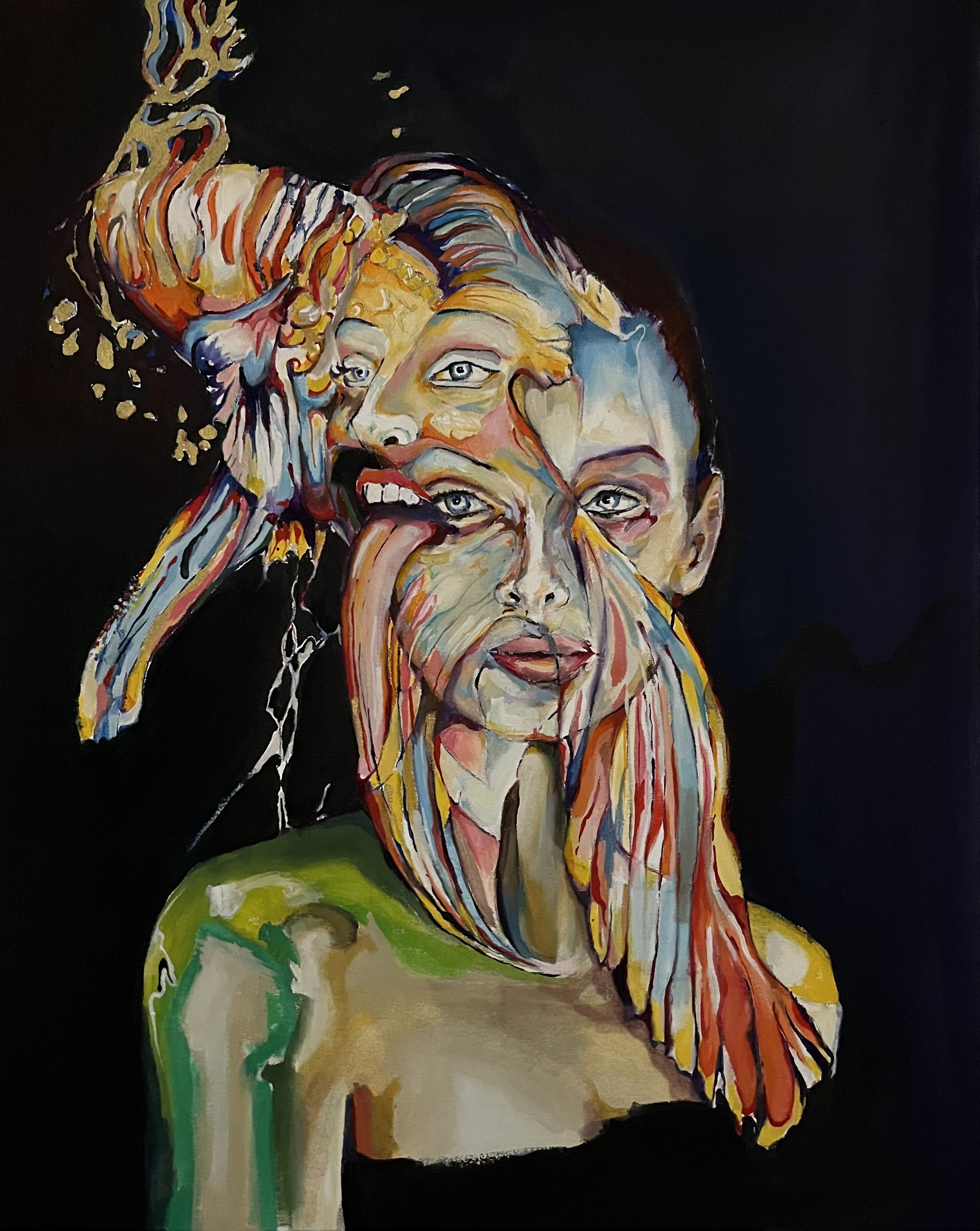
Arno Carstens - Water Spirit, oil on canvas, 2022

== Discography ==
Springbok Nude Girls – Neanderthal 1 (Epic, 1995)

Springbok Nude Girls – It Became a Weapon EP (Epic, 1996)

Springbok Nude Girls – be-vest@iafrica.com EP (Epic, 1997)

Springbok Nude Girls – AfterLifeSatisfaction (Epic, 1997)

Springbok Nude Girls – Omnisofa EP (Epic, 1998)

Springbok Nude Girls – OPTI MUM EP (Epic, 1998)

Springbok Nude Girls – Surpass The Powers (Epic, 1999)

Springbok Nude Girls – Un-E.Z. EP (Epic, 1999)

Springbok Nude Girls – Relaxor (Epic, 2000)

Springbok Nude Girls – The Fat Lady Sings / Best of the Springbok Nude Girls 1995–2001 (Epic, 2001)

Arno Carstens – Another Universe (Sony, 2003)

Springbok Nude Girls – Goddank Vir Klank 1994 – 2004 (Sony, 2004)

Arno Carstens – The Hello Goodbye Boys (SonyBMG, 2005)

Nude Girls – Nude Girls (Exclusive UK release)(Golden Fairy Records/SonyBMG, 2006)

Springbok Nude Girls – Peace Breaker (SonyBMG, 2007)

Springbok Nude Girls Live at London's Astoria DVD (SonyBMG, 2007)

Bhelltower – Bhelltower (SonyBMG, 2008)

Arno Carstens – Wonderful Wild (Sony, 2010)

Arno Carstens – Wonderful Wild Deluxe Edition (Sony, 2010)

Springbok Nude Girls – Apes with Shades (Sony, 2011)

Arno Carstens – Atari Gala (Gallo, 2012)

Arno Carstens – Lightning Prevails (Sheer, 2014)

Arno Carstens – Die Aand EP (Select, 2016)

Arno Carstens – Die Aandblom 13 (Select, 2016)

Arno Carstens - Out of the Light into the Night (Arno Carstens, 2021)
