= Bestival 2008 =

Music festival on the Isle of Wight

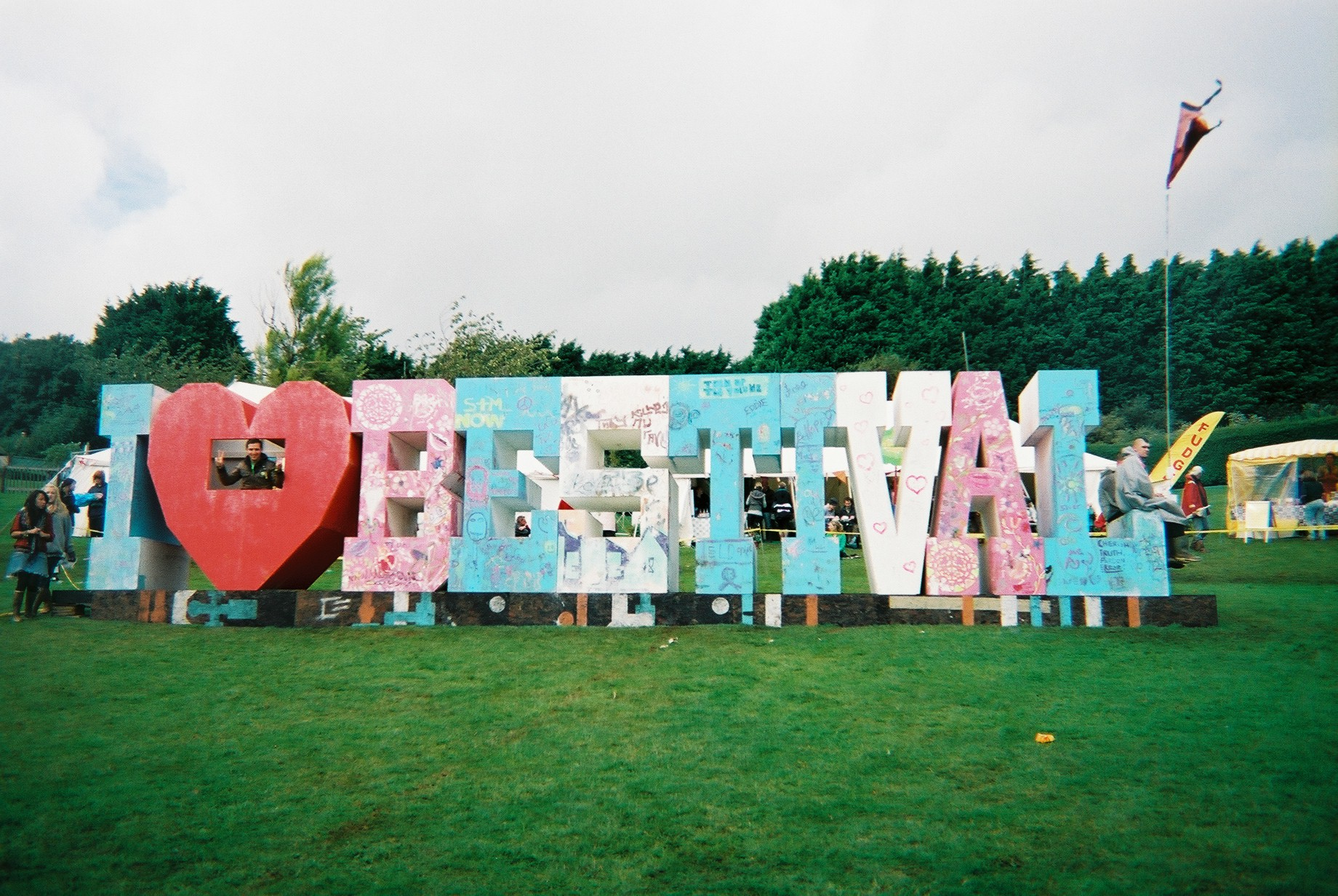
- Bestival 2008 at Robin Hill Country Park
- Genre: Alternative, boutique
- Dates: 5–7 September 2008
- Locations: Robin Hill, Downend, Isle of Wight, UK
- Website: Official website

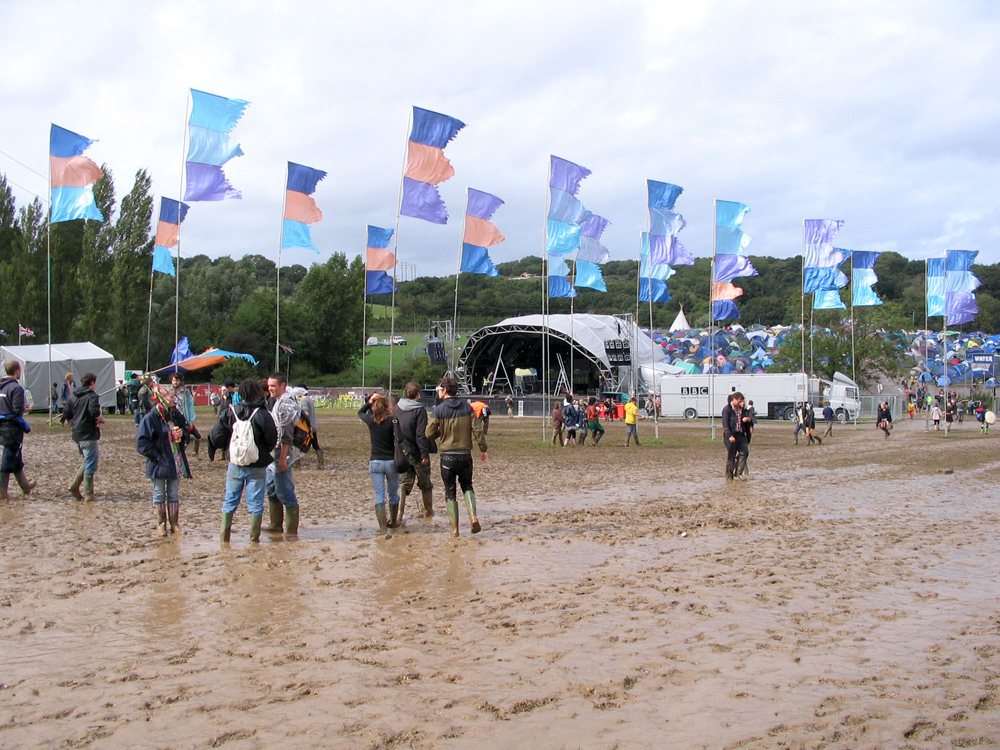
The mainstage of the 2008 event, surrounded by mud caused by heavy rain.

The Bestival 2008 was the fifth instalment of the Bestival a boutique music festival at Robin Hill on the Isle of Wight. The festival was held between 5–7 September 2008 and over 30,000 people attended.

The festival was nominated for Best Medium Sized Festival, Grass Roots Festival Award, Family Festival Award, Best Lineup and Best Toilets in the UK Festival Awards.

2008 marked the return of Bestival Radio. The station broadcast on-site and kept listeners camping at the festival up-to-date on news and events over the weekend. Bestival FM was sponsored by Jokers' Masquerade

The event was marred by heavy rain on the Friday and Saturday causing stage closures and widespread misery for festival-goers. The fancy dress theme was '30,000 freaks under the sea' so most were prepared for the ensuing aquatics.

== Line-up: Main Stage ==
=== Friday ===
- My Bloody Valentine
- Pendulum
- Foals
- Jamie Lidell
- The Wedding Present
- Joe Lean and the Jing Jang Jong, Bastila and The Shanklin Freakshow did not appear due to adverse weather

=== Saturday ===
- Amy Winehouse
- Hot Chip
- DJ Yoda
- The Human League
- Special Guest: Grace Jones
- Special Guests: The Specials - although they played under the name of Terry Hall and friends due to legal constraints
- The Cuban Brothers
- Gary Numan
- Dan Le Sac Vs Scroobius Pip
- Kitty Daisy & Lewis
- Jeffrey Lewis
- Laura Marling

=== Sunday ===
- Underworld
- George Clinton & Funkadelic/Parliament
- Roni Size
- Baaba Maal
- Sebastien Tellier
- Get Cape. Wear Cape. Fly
- King Creosote
- The Fairey Band (Acid Brass)

== Line-up: Big Top ==
=== Friday ===
- The Dub Pistols
- Slam
- CSS
- Chromeo
- The Breeders
- Santigold
- Ladyhawke
- Ebony Bones
- Transglobal Underground
- The Hat
- Cazals

=== Saturday ===
- 808 State
- Aphex Twin
- Hercules & Love Affair
- Lee 'Scratch' Perry
- Sub Focus
- Bailey
- The Count & Sinden
- Slagsmålsklubben
- Red Snapper
- Chas & Dave
- The Human League
- I Am Kloot
- The Qemists

=== Sunday ===
- Neon Neon
- Carl Craig
- Coldcut
- Midnight Juggernauts
- The Coral
- Filfthy Dukes
- Ulrich Schnauss
- Grand National
- Emma J Mac

== Line-up: other stages ==
- BBC Introducing: Cage the Elephant, Will Young, The Bees - a number of artists including Black Kids, Sam Sparro, Lykke Li, The Shortwave Set, Ida Maria, Natty, Noah and the Whale, Hadouken!, Late of the Pier and Pete & The Pirates had been due to play but were cancelled due to flooding of the lower part of the Bestival site
- Red Bull 54 Speakeasy: Alphabeat, Lethal Bizzle, The Sugarhill Gang, DJ Yoda
- Bandstand: Paul Heaton, Yacht, Sophie Barker, Misty's Big Adventure, Lucky Elephant, MC'd by comedian Scott Anderson
