= Koopa (band) =

British band

- Origin: Sible Hedingham, Essex, England
- Genres: Indie rock, pop punk
- Years active: 2000–2010
- Members: Stu Cooper; Ollie Cooper; Joe Murphy

Koopa was a rock band from Sible Hedingham, near Colchester, Essex, England. The band formed in 2000 by the brothers Stuart Cooper (drums) and Oliver "Ollie" Cooper (vocals and guitar), plus Joe Murphy (vocals, bass, production). The band became the first act to have a Top 40 UK Singles Chart hit based on download sales only, and the first act to have a charting single without being signed to a record label, both facilitated by then-recent changes to rules for eligibility for the singles chart.

== Career ==
The band began working together whilst Ollie Cooper was a teenager at school. In 2003 they made some recordings with B-Unique Records and EMI.

Between 2004 and 2007, the band toured continuously, both locally and nationally. During this period, they released two singles on Mad Cow Records. "No Trend" made the UK Singles Chart, peaking at No. 71. Their records included "Stand Up 4 England", a World Cup related song supporting the England national team, the lyrics of which were written for the band by Paul Baker. The single featured on the 2006 re-release of England (The Album).

At the end of 2006 the band released a non-chart-eligible EP called "Three in a Bed with Bobby George". The cover featured the band in bed with the darts player, Bobby George. The EP also featured "Erin's Main Obsession", "Pop Rock Factory", "How True" and "Unique" as well as "Blag, Steal and Borrow", the song that went on to become the band's download-only history making single.

=== Breakthrough ===
In January 2007, changes to the chart rules in the UK meant that songs which are not released on physical formats (such as CDs or on vinyl) would now be eligible to chart through downloaded copies. Koopa's single "Blag, Steal & Borrow" was released through music distributor Ditto Music and charted at No. 31 on 14 January 2007, making it the first single to chart without a physical release.

Koopa were reported as being the first 'unsigned' band to reach the charts. Although "self-issued" records are fairly common for unsigned bands, the costs of doing so mean that it is relatively rare for enough copies of such records to be produced in order to gain a chart position. Wealthier artists who are able to fund their own record label have also previously charted without a record deal. KOOPA's achievement is to have entered the Top 40 Chart as an unsigned band through sales of downloads alone, there being no physical copy of the single in existence.

In June 2007, the band were invited to open the Isle of Wight Festival from the main stage.

On 11 June 2007, "One Off Song for the Summer" debuted on the midweek chart at No. 12; later in the week, it dropped to No. 17. By the following Sunday, 17 June, the single had fallen to No. 21 on the charts.

October brought further success for the band when they returned from the Glasswerk New Music Awards with not only the MySpace Award in recognition of their successful use of the site in their self-promotion, but also the final award of the night, The 2007 Achievement Award.

On 29 October 2007, "The Crash" was released, which listed in the midweek chart at No. 12, appearing in the Official UK Singles Chart the following Sunday at No. 16 making them a "Top 20" band.

=== Signed band and inactivity ===
On 15 January 2008, Koopa announced that they had signed a deal with record label Pied Piper Records for three albums.

On 13 February 2008, the band announced that their new record company; Pied Piper, had given them the opportunity to record an album in the US, which was to be produced by Mark Hoppus (Blink 182). The band also announced the album was receiving its final mix and that they would be main support for Bowling for Soup on a UK Tour. The album was mastered by Brian Gardiner and was released at the beginning of 2009. In August 2008 the band announced that the first single from the forthcoming album would be "Gimmie It Back" which was released on 24 November 2008.

In February 2009, the Hoppus-produced album Lies Sell Stories was initially released in Japan via Yoshimoto records. The accompanying radio single "Gimmie It Back" received substantial air and video play on various broadcasters including MTV. After this the band were invited to perform a short promotional tour of Japan, accompanying Metro Station.

In April 2009, it was announced that Greatest Hits Part One (More Hits Than a Porn Website) was slated for release on 8 June 2009, via Genepool/Universal distribution.

As of June 2009, the band have licensed all vintage material to Cohort/Brilliant records in the UK, are signed to Yoshimoto R&C In Japan, and other material including the album Lies Sell Stories is owned by the band. However, the album was never released in the UK, and no music has been released by the band since.

In 2016, the band's manager Gary Raymond released a book called Blag, Steal and Borrow describing the band's history.

In June 2021, Murphy suffered a series of cardiac arrests, and was admitted to intensive care. He died in late June 2026, aged 46, as announced by his sister on social media.

== Discography ==
=== Albums ===
- Blag, Steal and Borrow (Japan only) – Pyropit Records (2007)
- Lies Sell Stories (Japan only) – Yoshimoto R and C (2009)
- Greatest Hits (Part One) – Brilliant/Universal (June 2009)

=== Singles ===
Year	Title	Chart Positions			Album
Year	Title	UK Singles Chart	UK Download Chart	UK Rock Chart	Album
2005	No Trend	71	-	-	Blag, Steal and Borrow
2006	Stand Up 4 England	79	-	-	Greatest Hits (Part One)
2006	Three in a Bed with Bobby George EP	-	-	-	-
2007	Blag, Steal and Borrow	31	24	-	Blag, Steal and Borrow
2007	One-Off Song for the Summer	21	15	8	Greatest Hits (Part One)
2007	The Crash	16	11	-	Lies Sell Stories
2008	Gimme It Back	-	-	-	Lies Sell Stories
