= Wakestock 2008 =

Wakestock 2008, sponsored by Relentless energy drink, was the 2008 edition of the Wakestock music and wakeboarding festival that took place at two venues in the UK in summer of that year. The two locations were Blenheim Palace in Oxfordshire and Abersoch in Cardigan Bay, Wales. The line-ups were fairly similar for both sets of concerts but some acts appeared only at one of the events.

== Blenheim Palace ==
The first festival takes place on the weekend of 27 to 29 June at the magnificent Blenheim Palace in Woodstock, Oxfordshire, England. The site will officially be open from 26–30 June. A large number of rock, pop and dance music acts will be performing over several stages.

The palace is home to the Duke of Marlborough and is a national heritage site. A specially constructed floating slider park will be put in place on the lake and over the weekend, in addition to the music, there is the opportunity to see some of the world's best wakeboarders battle it out for the title of Relentless Wakestock Blenheim Champion. Spectators can view all the action from the natural grandstand which surrounds the lake.

== Abersoch ==
The Abersoch concert takes place on the weekend of Friday 4th to Sunday 6 July 2008 at Abersoch in Cardigan Bay, Wales. The line-up is for the most part the same as for the Oxford event but there is the addition of several more big names including local superstar Duffy.

=== Line-up ===
Blenheim Palace

Friday	Saturday	Sunday
Groove Armada (Open Main Stage) [Abersoch]; Pendulum (Tent Main Stage) [Abersoch]; Plump DJ's (Tent Secondary Stage) [Abersoch]; Audio Bullys; Nu-Mark; Hadouken!; Trophy Twins; Friendly Fires; Royworld; Part Time Heroes; Cazals; TY; Hyper; DJ Play; DJ irk; Aynzli Jones	Mark Ronson (Open Main Stage) [Abersoch]; Happy Mondays (Tent, Secondary Stage) [Abersoch]; Funeral for a Friend (Tent Main Stage) [Abersoch]; Calvin Harris; Elliot Minor; Mystery Jets; The Blackout; Operator Please; You Me At Six; Norman Jay; Jazzie B; In Case of Fire; Kick Box Riot; The Hyenas	The Streets; Estelle; Supergrass; The Futureheads; Young Knives; Black Kids; Lightspeed Champion; Metronomy; The Dykeenies; Matt Costa; The Nextmen; Miguel Del Bosque; A Silent Film; Little Fish

There are also a number of acts which have not got a confirmed stage.

Abersoch

Some top acts are only performing at Abersoch at the Wakestock concerts:

- Sunday: Duffy, The Hoosiers, One Night Only
