= Blag, Steal & Borrow (song) =

Single by Koopa

from the album Blag, Steal & Borrow
- Released: 8 January 2007
- Recorded: 2006
- Genre: Punk rock

Koopa singles chronology
"Three in a Bed with Bobby George" (2006)	"Blag, Steal & Borrow" (2007)	"One Off Song for the Summer" (2007)

"Blag, Steal & Borrow" is the fourth single by English punk band Koopa. It was released as a download-only single on 8 January 2007. It became the first single released by Koopa to reach the UK top 40, charting at number 31.

The song was the first single to reach the UK's chart without being released on any traditional 'physical' format. This occurred after a change in chart rules a week previously, which meant that all legally downloaded singles would be eligible to chart. The single's success led to speculation as to whether it represented the first in a new trend of bands charting without getting a deal with a record company.
