= John Giddings =

English music promoter

John Giddings (born 1 May 1953 in St Albans, Hertfordshire) is an English music agent and promoter who has run the Isle of Wight Festival since its revival in 2002.

== Early career ==
Giddings graduated from Exeter University with a Philosophy & Sociology degree. He worked booking bands at the university as social secretary and later entertainment chairman.

== Solo Music Agency and Promoters ==
After forming Solo, Giddings was employed as the agent responsible for David Bowie's concert at Wembley Stadium followed soon afterwards by a stadium tour with Genesis. In 1990 The Rolling Stones took on Giddings as European promoter and the likes of U2, Madonna and Celine Dion were soon added to his roster of clients.

Over the past 30 years Giddings has represented artists such as The Corrs, The Police, Lady Gaga, Westlife, Boyzone, N*E*R*D and Pharrell Williams, Simple Minds and Spandau Ballet.

In 2008, Solo Agency & Promotions managed three of the five top-selling concert tours around the world. The Sticky & Sweet Tour by Madonna ranked highest, grossing $281.6 million. The second-highest tour was by Celine Dion, at $236.6 million, and the fifth-highest tour was by The Police, at $120.6 million.

In 2009 Giddings was recruited as the global agent and promoter of Universal Music's Formula 1 live music event, F1 Rocks.

Also in 2009, Billboard named three of Giddings' clients as the top-grossing tours of the previous decade - The Rolling Stones at number 1 with $869m, U2 at number 2 with $844m and Madonna at number 3 with $801m.

== Isle Of Wight Festival ==
In 2002 the 1971 Isle Of Wight Act (which banned events on the island with more than 5000 attendees) was overturned in time for the Queen's Golden Jubilee and Giddings was recruited to revive the Isle Of Wight Festival - a festival that he first attended as a teenager in 1970.

The first Isle of Wight Festival since 1970 was called Rock Island 2002 and it took place on 3 June 2002 with Giddings and Solo acting as promoter rather than organiser. It was headlined by The Charlatans and featured appearances from the likes of Robert Plant, Starsailor and Ash. It was single day festival attended by around 8-10,000 but the event reportedly lost the Isle Of Wight Council around £380,000.

Giddings took over the running of the festival from the council in 2003 and, despite losing an estimated £500,000 that year, the festival has become a multi-day event that currently has an annual attendance of between 50,000 and 60,000 and contributes between £10-15m to the local economy. In this time Giddings has been responsible for booking headliners such as Bruce Springsteen, Pearl Jam, Coldplay, The Who, The Rolling Stones, Paul McCartney and David Bowie.

On 5 November 2007, the Isle of Wight Festival was named 'Best Major Festival' at the UK Festival Awards. At the same event Giddings won the award for 'Outstanding Contribution to UK festivals'.

== Personal life ==
Giddings has three daughters from his relationship with his first wife (who he met whilst at Exeter University - where he studied Philiosphy and Sociology), and has one stepdaughter resulting from his marriage to his second wife, Caroline who has a daughter from her first marriage.
