= Seaclose Park =

Park in Newport, Isle of Wight, England

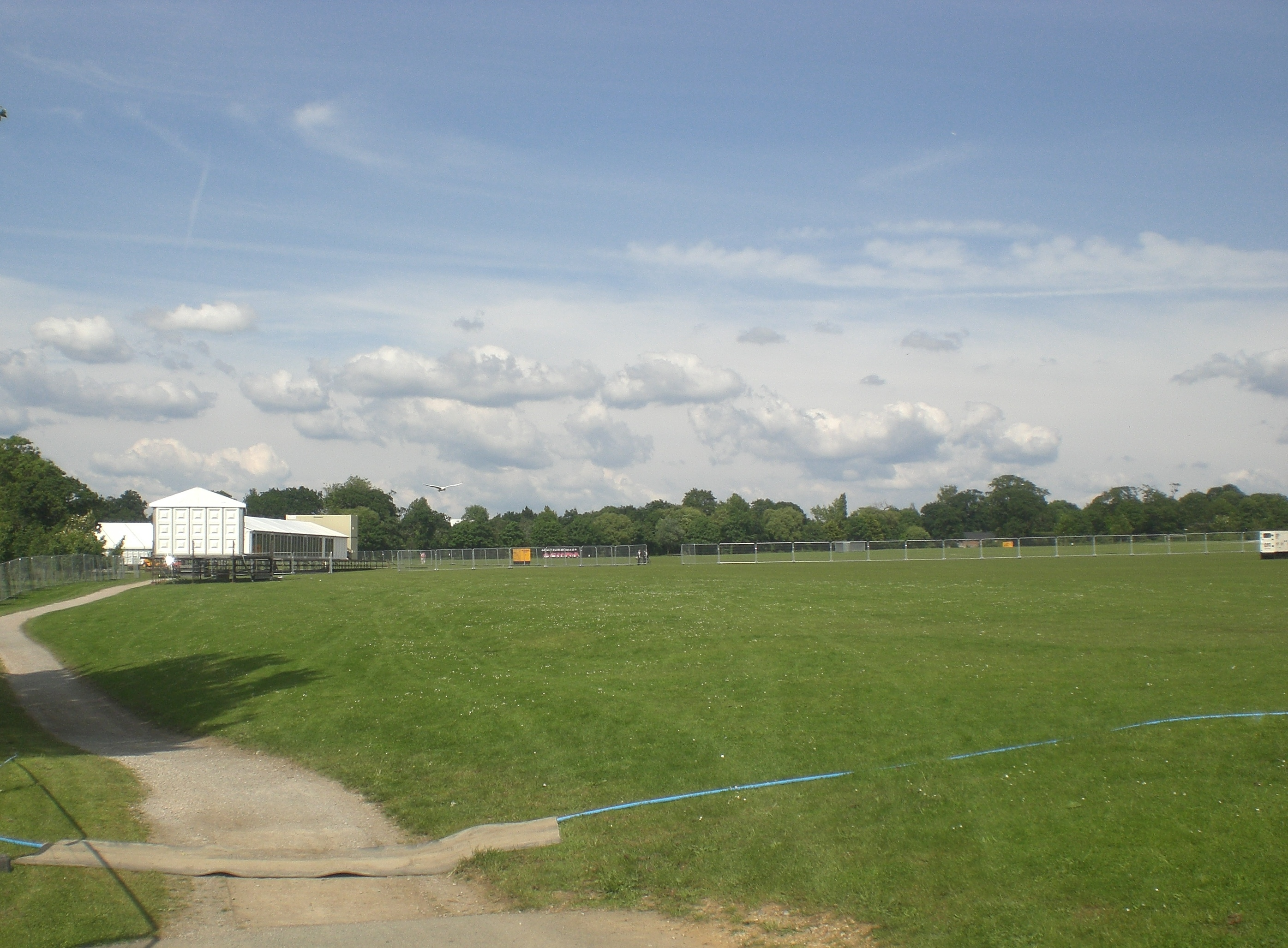
- Seaclose Park while the Isle of Wight Festival is being set up.
- Interactive map of Seaclose Park
- Type: Public park
- Location: Newport, Isle of Wight
- Coordinates: 50.708°N 1.28645°W
- Operator: Isle of Wight Council
- Status: Open all year

Seaclose Park is a large parkland site situated to the North East of Newport on the Isle of Wight. It lies on the eastern banks of the River Medina. It has a variety of features which are available free to the community of the Island and to visitors. The features of the park include a skate park, three tennis courts, one cricket pitch and wicket, one bowling green, three netball courts and two five-a-side pitches. The park is along Fairlee Road, linking Newport to East Cowes and Ryde.

Seaclose Park is the site of the revived Isle of Wight Festival and as such, it has received great publicity and investment to maintain its condition for the festival.

For 16 December 2009, the park was transformed to a Winter Wonderland after coming top in a competition held by Nokia, with nearly 2,400 votes to have it held on the island.
