= Isle of Wight Festival =

Music festival on the Isle of Wight, England

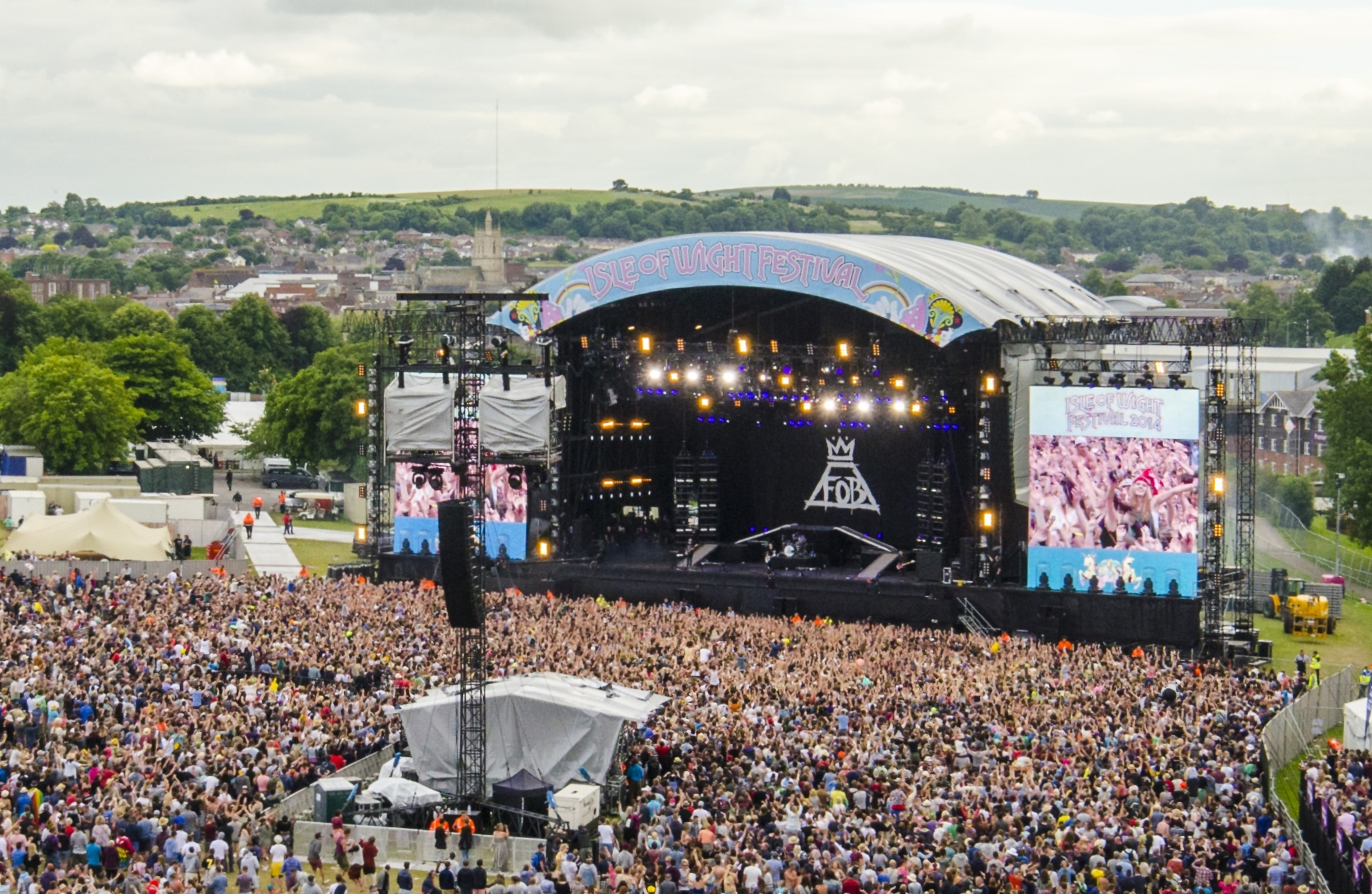
- Genre: Rock, pop
- Dates: 18–21 June 2026
- Locations: Seaclose Park, Newport, Isle of Wight, England
- Years active: Original; 1968–1970; Revival; 2002–2019; 2021–present
- Website: isleofwightfestival.com

The Isle of Wight Festival is a British music festival which takes place annually in Newport on the Isle of Wight, England. It was originally a counterculture event held from 1968 to 1970.

The 1970 event was by far the largest of these early festivals and the unexpectedly high attendance levels led, in 1971, to Parliament adding a section to the Isle of Wight County Council Act 1971 preventing overnight open-air gatherings of more than 5,000 people on the island without a special licence from the council. The event was revived in 2002 with Rock Island 2002, and has since been held annually, except for 2020 when it was cancelled due to the COVID-19 pandemic.

== Original festival ==
The original events were promoted and organised by the Foulk brothers (Ron and Ray Foulk) under the banner of their company Fiery Creations Limited and their younger brother Bill Foulk. The venues were Ford Farm (near Godshill), Wootton and Afton Down (near Freshwater) respectively. The 1969 event featured Bob Dylan and the Band. This was Dylan's first paid performance since his motor cycle accident some three years earlier, and was held at a time when many still wondered if he would ever perform again. Followers from across the world trekked to the Isle of Wight for the performance. Estimates of 150,000–250,000 attended. The 1969 festival opened on Friday 29 August—eleven days after the close of Woodstock. Dylan was living in Woodstock, New York, at the time and it was widely believed that he would perform there, after the event had been "put in his own backyard". As it happened, Dylan left for the Isle of Wight on 15 August—the day the Woodstock festival began.

The 1970 event was by far the largest of these early festivals; indeed it was said at the time to be one of the largest human gatherings in the world, with estimates of over 600,000, surpassing the attendance at Woodstock. Included in the line-up of over fifty performers were Jimi Hendrix, Miles Davis, The Doors, The Who, Lighthouse, Ten Years After, Terry Reid, Emerson, Lake & Palmer, Joni Mitchell, The Moody Blues, Melanie, Donovan, Gilberto Gil, Free, Chicago, Richie Havens, John Sebastian, Leonard Cohen, Jethro Tull, Taste (Irish band) and Tiny Tim. The unexpectedly high attendance levels led, in 1971, to Parliament adding a section to the Isle of Wight County Council Act 1971 preventing overnight open-air gatherings of more than 5,000 people on the island without a special licence from the council.

The 1970 festival was filmed by a film crew under director Murray Lerner, who at that point had just directed the Academy Award-nominated documentary Festival of the Newport Folk Festival. The footage passed to Lerner in settlement of legal fees after a dispute with the Foulk brothers in which each side claimed against the other for breach of contract. Lerner distilled material from the festival into the film Message to Love (released on video in the US as Message to Love: The Isle of Wight Festival: The Movie) released theatrically in 1996 and subsequently on DVD. In addition to this film, Lerner has created full-length films focused on performances by individual artists at the 1970 festival. To date there have been individual films of Miles Davis, Jimi Hendrix, The Who, Emerson, Lake & Palmer, The Moody Blues, Free, Taste (Irish band), Leonard Cohen, Jethro Tull, The Doors and Joni Mitchell. Dave Roe (ex Liverpool Collegiate) produced all the psychedelic artwork for posters and advertising material.

== Revived festival details ==
The event was revived in 2002 at Seaclose Park, a recreation ground on the outskirts of Newport. It has been held annually since that year, progressively extending itself northwards beyond Seaclose Park along the fields of the eastern Medina valley. Many artists have performed since its revival including The Rolling Stones, Blondie, Amy Winehouse, Robbie Williams, Paolo Nutini, The Crazy World of Arthur Brown, The Prodigy, Green Day, Paul McCartney, Fleetwood Mac, Red Hot Chili Peppers, Muse, Boy George, Sex Pistols, Rod Stewart, Calvin Harris, Stereophonics, Yungblud, Pulp, Faithless, Donovan, Ray Davies, Robert Plant, Queen + Adam Lambert, David Bowie, Liam Gallagher, Noel Gallagher’s High Flying Birds, Manic Street Preachers, The Who, The High Kings, Placebo, R.E.M., Travis, Coldplay, The Zombies, Pearl Jam, The Proclaimers, Bon Jovi, Bryan Adams, The Police, Foo Fighters, The Killers, Nile Rodgers and Chic, The Stone Roses, Madness, Lewis Capaldi, Paloma Faith, James Marriott, Kings of Leon and Rick Astley. Bowie's 13 June 2004 concert would prove to be his last live performance in the UK following emergency angioplasty in Hamburg after a concert in Germany twelve days later which eventually saw him retire from touring. It was sponsored by Nokia from 2004 to 2006. The promoters of the event now are Solo Promoters Ltd.

=== 2002 ===
Held 3 June 2002

- Attendance: 8,000 (approx.)
- Headline acts (Saturday): The Charlatans, Robert Plant

=== 2003 ===
Held 14–15 June 2003

- Attendance: 15,000 (approx)
- Headline acts:
  - Saturday: Paul Weller, Starsailor
  - Sunday: Bryan Adams, Counting Crows

=== 2004 ===
Held 11–13 June 2004

- Attendance: 35,000 (approx)
- Headline acts:
  - Friday: Stereophonics, Groove Armada
  - Saturday: The Who, Manic Street Preachers
  - Sunday: David Bowie, The Charlatans

=== 2005 ===
Held 10–12 June 2005

- Attendance: 50,000 (approx)
- Headline acts:
  - Friday: Faithless, Razorlight
  - Saturday: Travis, Roxy Music
  - Sunday: R.E.M., Snow Patrol

=== 2006 ===
Held 9–11 June 2006

- Attendance: 50,000 (approx)
- Headline acts:
  - Friday: The Prodigy, Placebo
  - Saturday: Foo Fighters, Primal Scream
  - Sunday: Coldplay, Richard Ashcroft

=== 2007 ===
Held 8–10 June 2007

- Attendance: 60,000 (approx)
- Headline acts:
  - Friday: Snow Patrol, Groove Armada
  - Saturday: Muse, Kasabian
  - Sunday: The Rolling Stones, Keane

=== 2008 ===
Held 13–15 June 2008

- Attendance: 55,000 (approx)
- Headline acts:
  - Thursday: (Big Top) Björn Again, Suspiciously Elvis
  - Friday: Kaiser Chiefs, N.E.R.D
  - Saturday: Sex Pistols, Ian Brown
  - Sunday: The Police, The Kooks

=== 2009 ===
Held 12–14 June 2009

- Attendance: 50,000 (approx)
- Headline acts:
  - Thursday: (Big Top) The Human League, King Meets Queen
  - Friday: The Prodigy, Basement Jaxx
  - Saturday: Stereophonics, Razorlight
  - Sunday: Neil Young, Pixies

=== 2010 ===
Held 11–13 June 2010

- Attendance: 60,000 (approx)
- Headline acts:
  - Thursday: (Big Top) Squeeze, Are You Experienced
  - Friday: Jay-Z, Florence and the Machine
  - Saturday: The Strokes, Blondie
  - Sunday: Paul McCartney, P!nk

=== 2011 ===
Held 10–12 June 2011

- Attendance: 65,000 (approx)
- Headline acts:
  - Thursday: (Big Top) Boy George, ABC
  - Friday: Kings of Leon, Kaiser Chiefs
  - Saturday: Foo Fighters, Pulp
  - Sunday: Kasabian, Beady Eye

=== 2012 ===
Held 22–24 June 2012

- Attendance: 55,000 (approx)
- Headline acts:
  - Thursday: (Big Top) Primal Scream, The Stranglers
  - Friday: Tom Petty & The Heartbreakers, Elbow
  - Saturday: Pearl Jam, Biffy Clyro
  - Sunday: Bruce Springsteen and The E Street Band, Noel Gallagher's High Flying Birds

=== 2013 ===
Held 14–16 June 2013

- Attendance: 58,000 (approx)
- Headline acts:
  - Thursday: (Big Top) Happy Mondays, The Farm
  - Friday: The Stone Roses, Paul Weller
  - Saturday: The Killers, Bloc Party
  - Sunday: Bon Jovi, The Script

=== 2014 ===
Held 12–15 June 2014

- Attendance: 58,000+ (approx)
- Headline acts:
  - Thursday: (Big Top) Boy George, Inspiral Carpets
  - Friday: Calvin Harris, Biffy Clyro
  - Saturday: Red Hot Chili Peppers, The Specials
  - Sunday: Kings of Leon, Suede

=== 2015 ===
Held 11–14 June 2015

- Attendance: 58,000+ (approx)
- Headline acts:
  - Thursday: (Big Top) Billy Idol, UB40
  - Friday: The Prodigy, The Black Keys
  - Saturday: Blur, Pharrell Williams
  - Sunday: Fleetwood Mac, Paolo Nutini

=== 2016 ===
Held 9–12 June 2016

- Attendance: 58,000+ (approx)
- Headline acts:
  - Thursday: (Big Top) Status Quo, Cast
  - Friday: Faithless, Stereophonics
  - Saturday: The Who, Richard Ashcroft
  - Sunday: Queen + Adam Lambert, Ocean Colour Scene

=== 2017 ===
Held 8–11 June 2017

- Attendance: 45,000+
- Headline acts:
  - Thursday: (Big Top) Razorlight, Starsailor
  - Friday: David Guetta, Run-D.M.C.
  - Saturday: Arcade Fire, Catfish and the Bottlemen
  - Sunday: Rod Stewart, Bastille

=== 2018 ===
Held 21–24 June 2018

- Attendance: 72,000
- Headline acts:
  - Thursday: (Big Top) The Wombats, Hot Dub Time Machine
  - Friday: Kasabian, The Script
  - Saturday: Depeche Mode, Liam Gallagher
  - Sunday: The Killers, Manic Street Preachers

=== 2019 ===
Held 13–16 June 2019

- Attendance: 59,000
- Headline Acts:
  - Thursday: (Big Top) Wet Wet Wet, Heather Small
  - Friday: Noel Gallagher's High Flying Birds, Courteeners
  - Saturday: Fatboy Slim, George Ezra
  - Sunday: Biffy Clyro, Richard Ashcroft

=== 2020 ===
The 2020 event, which had been scheduled for 11–15 June, was cancelled due to the COVID-19 pandemic.

- Originally scheduled headline acts:
  - Thursday: (Big Top) Happy Mondays
  - Friday: Lionel Richie, Lewis Capaldi
  - Saturday: Snow Patrol, The Chemical Brothers
  - Sunday: Duran Duran, Black Eyed Peas

On 12–14 June 2020, Absolute Radio and Sky Arts both held virtual festivals, broadcasting selected acts from the festival's archives, including exclusive footage from the 1970 edition.

=== 2021 ===
The 2021 event was originally scheduled to take place on 17–20 June, it was postponed to 16–19 September, the first time that it took place in the autumn.

- Headline acts:
  - Thursday: (Big Top) Scouting for Girls, Sophie Ellis-Bextor
  - Friday: Liam Gallagher, Tom Jones
  - Saturday: David Guetta, Snow Patrol
  - Sunday: Duran Duran, The Script,

Sky Arts broadcast sets from the show each night of the festival from 7 pm with Becky Hill, Kaiser Chiefs and Razorlight's sets shown alongside the headliners.

=== 2022 ===
The 2022 event took place on 16–19 June.

- Headline acts:
  - Thursday: (Big Top) Happy Mondays, Heather Small
  - Friday: Lewis Capaldi, Madness,
  - Saturday: Pete Tong, Kasabian,
  - Sunday: Muse, Rudimental

=== 2023 ===
The 2023 event took place on 15–18 June.

- Headline Acts:
  - Thursday: (Big Top) Groove Armada (DJ set), LF System
  - Friday: Pulp, Courteeners
  - Saturday: The Chemical Brothers, George Ezra
  - Sunday: Robbie Williams, Blondie

=== 2024 ===
The 2024 event took place on 20–23 June

- Headline Acts:
  - Thursday: (Big Top) Scouting for Girls, Dagny
  - Friday: The Prodigy, The Streets
  - Saturday: Pet Shop Boys, Keane
  - Sunday: Green Day, Simple Minds

=== 2025 ===
The 2025 event took place on 19–22 June

- Headline Acts:
  - Thursday: (Big Top) Example, The Pigeon Detectives
  - Friday: Faithless, Sting
  - Saturday: Stereophonics, The Script
  - Sunday: Justin Timberlake, Jess Glynne

=== 2026 ===
The 2026 event took place on 18–21 June

- Main Stage
  - Friday: Lewis Capaldi, Wet Leg
  - Saturday: Calvin Harris, Teddy Swims
  - Sunday: The Cure, The Kooks

== Awards ==
List of awards and nominations received by the Isle of Wight Festival
Year	Award	Category	Nominee(s)	Result	Ref.
2007	UK Festival Awards	Best Major Festival	—N/a	Won	
2007	UK Festival Awards	Outstanding Contribution to UK Festivals	John Giddings	Won	
2009	ILMC 21 Arthur Awards	Liggers' Favourite Festival	—N/a	Won	
2015	UK Festival Awards	Best Family Festival	—N/a	Won	
2015	UK Festival Awards	Headline Performance of the Year	Fleetwood Mac	Won	
2015	Isle of Wight Visitor Attraction Association Awards	Best Activity/Event	—N/a	Won	
2015	Festival Baby Awards	Best Festival	—N/a	Won	
2016	Family Traveller Awards	Best Family Festival	—N/a	Won	
2016	ILMC 28 Arthur Awards	Liggers' Favourite Festival	—N/a	Nominated	
2016	Live Music Business Awards	Best Festival	—N/a	Won	
2016	Red Funnel Isle of Wight Awards	Best Event to Lie Back & Soak Up the Sounds	—N/a	Won	
2017	ILMC 29 Arthur Awards	Liggers' Favourite Festival	—N/a	Nominated	
2017	Red Funnel Isle of Wight Awards	Best Event to Lie Back & Soak Up the Sounds	—N/a	Won	
2018	Red Funnel Isle of Wight Awards	Best Event to Lie Back & Soak Up the Sounds	—N/a	Won	
2018	Audio Production Awards	Best New Producer	Nick Harris	Won	
2018	Event Production Awards	Music Event of the Year	—N/a	Won	
2018	ILMC 30 Arthur Awards	Liggers' Favourite Festival	—N/a	Nominated	
2018	Music Week Awards	Festival of the Year	—N/a	Nominated	
2018	Radio Academy Awards	Best Coverage of an Event	Absolute Radio	Nominated	
2018	Radio Academy Awards	Best New Presenter	James Bay	Nominated	
2018	Radio Academy Awards	Best Factual Storytelling	—N/a	Nominated	
2018	Q Awards	Best Festival/Event	—N/a	Nominated	
2018	UK Festival Awards	Best Festival Production	—N/a	Nominated	
2018	UK Festival Awards	Best Major Festival	—N/a	Nominated	
2018	UK Festival Awards	Line-Up of the Year	—N/a	Nominated	
2019	Broadcast Awards	Best Music Programme	—N/a	Nominated	
2019	Event Production Awards	Music Event of the Year	—N/a	Nominated	
2019	Live Music Business Awards	Best Festival Performance	Biffy Clyro	Nominated	
2019	Music Week Awards	Festival of the Year	—N/a	Nominated	
2019	Q Awards	Q Best Festival/Event	—N/a	Nominated	
2020	Pollstar Awards	International Music Festival of the Year	—N/a	Nominated	

== Celebrating the Isle of Wight Festival's history ==
In 2025, Island shop Triple A Records opened a museum dedicated to the Isle of Wight's musical heritage, including the festival's history. The permanent exhibition can be found on the shop's first floor and features vintage posters, t-shirts, vinyl records, and a sleeping bag from the 1970 festival.

In August 2026, the 1969 and 1970 festivals were the subject of BBC Radio 4's The Reunion, featuring in conversation Justin Hayward of The Moody Blues, Jacqui McShee of Pentangle, and Ian Anderson of Jethro Tull. Also in the programme were Melody Maker writer Richard Williams, island resident Terrii Telfer, and two of the Foulk brothers who organised the event.

== See also ==
- List of historic rock festivals
- List of music festivals in the United Kingdom
