= Rory Gallagher discography =

Albums and singles by Rory Gallagher

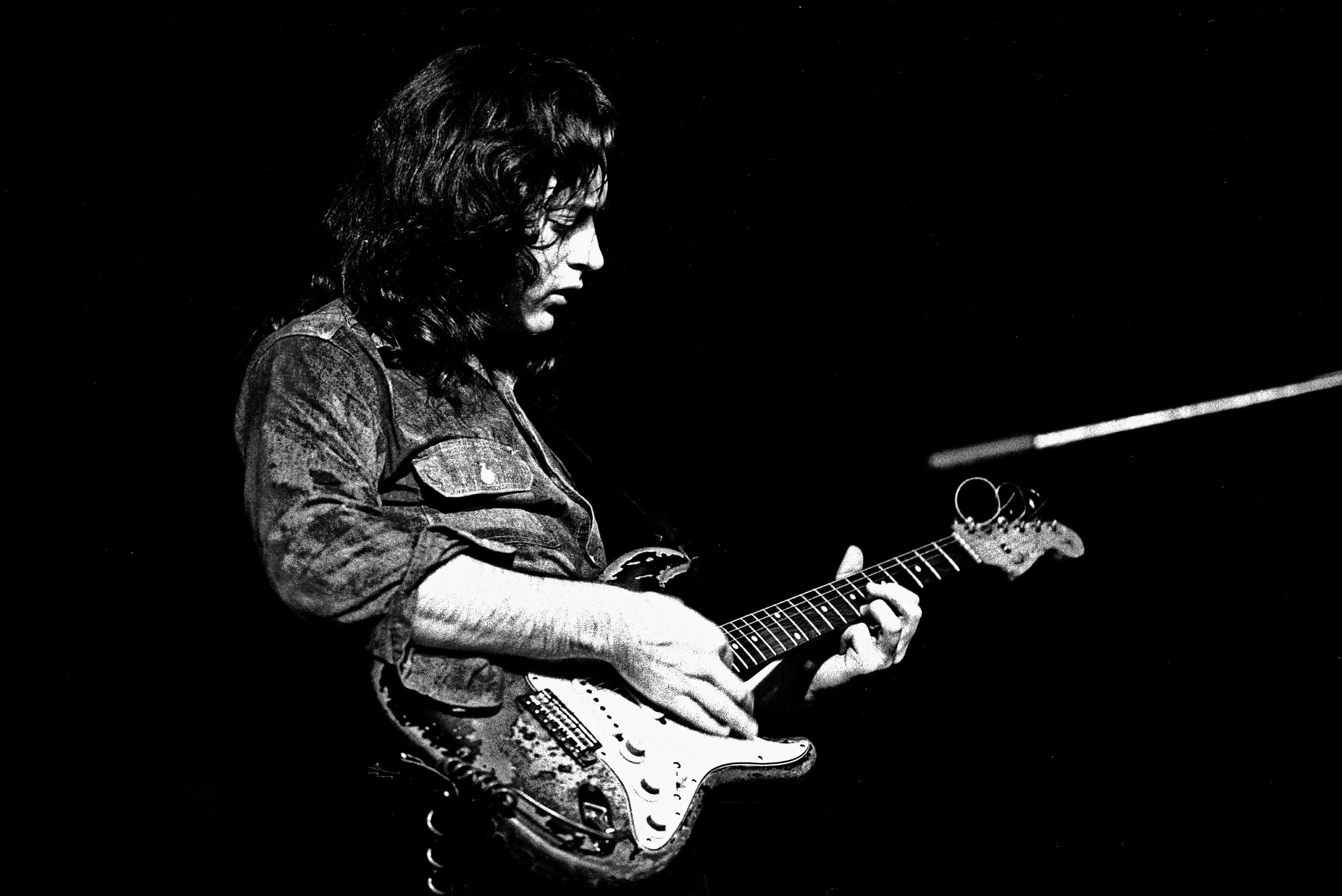
- Rory Gallagher and his famous Stratocaster
- Studio albums: 11
- Live albums: 6
- Compilation albums: 13
- Singles: 5
- Video albums: 11
- Box sets: 2

The discography of Rory Gallagher, an Irish guitarist and singer-songwriter, consists of 11 studio albums, 6 live albums, 13 compilations, and 5 singles. Gallagher was a solo artist for much of his career and collaborated with artists such as Muddy Waters and Jerry Lee Lewis. Before his career as a solo artist, Gallagher was the guitarist, vocalist, and saxophonist for the Irish rock trio Taste.

== Taste ==
Having completed a musical apprenticeship in the Irish showbands, and influenced by the increasing popularity of beat groups during the early 1960s, Gallagher formed Taste, a blues rock and R&B power trio, in 1966. Initially, the band was composed of Gallagher and two Cork musicians, Norman Damery and Eric Kitteringham, however, by 1968, they were replaced with two musicians from Belfast, featuring Gallagher on guitar and vocals, drummer John Wilson, and bassist Richard McCracken. Performing extensively in the United Kingdom, the group played regularly at the Marquee Club, supporting both Cream at their Royal Albert Hall farewell concert, and the blues supergroup Blind Faith on a tour of North America. Managed by Eddie Kennedy, the trio released the albums Taste and On The Boards, and two live recordings, Live Taste and Live at the Isle of Wight. The latter appeared long after the band's break-up, which occurred shortly after their appearance at the 1970 Isle of Wight Festival.

== Solo career ==
After the break-up of Taste, Gallagher toured under his own name, hiring former Deep Joy bass player Gerry McAvoy to play on his eponymous debut album, Rory Gallagher. It was the beginning of a twenty-year musical relationship between Gallagher and McAvoy; the other band member was drummer Wilgar Campbell. The 1970s were Gallagher's most prolific period. He produced ten albums in that decade, including two live albums, Live in Europe and Irish Tour '74. November 1971 saw the release of his album, Deuce. Around the same time, he was voted Melody Maker's International Top Musician of the Year, ahead of Eric Clapton. However, despite a number of his albums from this period reaching the UK Albums Chart, Gallagher did not attain major star status.

Gallagher is documented in the 1974 film Irish Tour '74, directed by Tony Palmer. During the heightened periods of political unrest in Ireland, as other artists were warned not to tour, Gallagher was resolute about touring Ireland at least once a year during his career, winning him the dedication of thousands of fans, and in the process, becoming a role model for other aspiring young Irish musicians. The line-up for the Irish Tour which included Rod de'Ath on drums and Lou Martin on keyboards, performed together between 1973 and 1976. Releases from that period include Blueprint, Tattoo, Irish Tour '74, Against the Grain and Calling Card. This Gallagher band performed several TV and radio shows across Europe, including Beat-Club in Bremen, Germany and the Old Grey Whistle Test. Gallagher recorded two Peel Sessions, both in February 1973 and containing the same tracks, but only the first was broadcast. Along with Little Feat and Roger McGuinn, Gallagher performed the first Rockpalast live concert at the Grugahalle, Essen, Germany in 1977.

In 1978 Gallagher trimmed his band down to just guitar, bass and drums, and the act became a power trio as Taste had been. This line-up produced Photo-Finish, Top Priority, Jinx, Defender, and Fresh Evidence. During this period Gallagher was often obsessive over details and plagued by self-doubt yet he retained a loyal fan base.

== Collaborations and posthumous releases ==
Gallagher collaborated with Jerry Lee Lewis and Muddy Waters on their respective London Sessions in the mid-1970s. He played on Lonnie Donegan's final album. He was David Coverdale's second choice (after Jeff Beck) to replace Ritchie Blackmore in Deep Purple although Gallagher chose to remain a solo artist. When former members of the Yardbirds (Chris Dreja, Paul Samwell-Smith, and Jim McCarty) reunited to create the band Box of Frogs Gallagher was invited to record with them on their first album.

Gallagher's career was cut short due to his untimely death on 14 June 1995. He died from complications after a liver transplant. Several posthumous albums have emerged since his death. Two of the most notable are Wheels Within Wheels, a compilation of acoustic folk and blues music released in 2003 and Notes From San Francisco, an album of unreleased studio tracks and a San Francisco 1979 concert released in 2011.

== Albums ==
=== Taste albums ===
Year	Album	Chart position
Year	Album	UK
1968-69	London Invasion (BBC sessions + live tracks): Label: Pontiac Records	
1969	Taste: Label: Polydor	
1970	On the Boards: Label: Polydor	18
1971	Live Taste (live album): Label: Polydor	14
1972	Live at the Isle of Wight (live album): Label: Polydor	41
1972	Taste First (recorded in 1967; re-released in 1974 as In the Beginning and again in 1976 as Take It Easy Baby): Label: BASF	
1994	The Best of Taste (compilation album): Label: Polydor	
2015	'Hail' The Collection (compilation album): Label: Spectrum Music	

=== Solo albums ===
Year	Album	Peak chart positions		BPI Certification
Year	Album	UK	US	BPI Certification
1971	Rory Gallagher: Released: 21 May 1971; Label: Polydor	32	—	Gold
1971	Deuce: Released: November 1971; Label: Polydor	39	—	Gold
1972	Live in Europe (live): Released: May 1972; Label: Polydor	9	—	Gold
1973	Blueprint: Released: February 1973; Label: Polydor	12	147	Gold
1973	Tattoo: Released: November 1973; Label: Polydor	32	186	Gold
1974	Irish Tour '74 (live): Released: July 1974; Label: Polydor	36	110	Gold
1975	Against the Grain: Released: October 1975; Label: Chrysalis	—	121	Gold
1976	Calling Card: Released: October 1976; Label: Chrysalis	32	163	Silver
1978	Photo-Finish: Released: 13 October 1978; Label: Chrysalis	—	116	Silver
1979	Top Priority: Released: September 1979; Label: Chrysalis	56	140	Silver
1980	Stage Struck (live): Released: October 1980; Label: Chrysalis	40	—	Silver
1982	Jinx: Released: April 1982; Label: Chrysalis; Mercury	68	—	Silver
1987	Defender: Released: July 1987; Label: Capo/Demon; I.R.S.	—	—	Silver
1990	Fresh Evidence: Released: 4 June 1990; Label: Capo/Castle; I.R.S.	—	—	Silver
"—" denotes releases that did not chart or were not released.

=== Posthumous albums ===
Year	Album	Chart position
Year	Album	UK
2003	Meeting with the G-Man (live): Released: 22 November 2003; Label: Capo/RCA	—
2006	Live at Montreux (live): Released: 31 July 2006; Label: Eagle	—
2011	Notes From San Francisco (studio & live): Released: 17 May 2011; Label: Capo/Legacy/Eagle	44
2020	Check Shirt Wizard: Live in '77 (live): Released: 6 March 2020; Label: Cadet Concept/Universal Music	26
2023	All Around Man: Live in London (live): Released: 7 July 2023; Label: Cadet Concept/Universal Music	—

=== Compilation albums ===
Year	Album	Chart position
Year	Album	UK
1974	The Story So Far	
1975	Sinner... And Saint also released as Rory Gallagher (compilation of tracks taken from Rory Gallagher and Deuce)	
1975	Rory Gallagher (Flashback series)	
1976	Rory Gallagher Live (Flashback series)	
1976	Take It Easy Baby (Taste demo sessions)	
1992	Edged in Blue (BPI: 60,000)	
1995	A Blue Day for the Blues: Released: 1995; Label: I.R.S.	
1999	BBC Sessions (one live disc and one studio disc): Released: 7 August 1999; Label: Capo	
2003	Wheels Within Wheels (acoustic): Released: 8 March 2003; Label: Capo	
2005	Big Guns: The Very Best of Rory Gallagher: Released: 13 June 2005; Label: Capo/RCA	31
2008	The Essential Rory Gallagher: Released: 10 March 2008; Label: Capo/Legacy/Sony BMG	
2009	Crest of a Wave: The Best of Rory Gallagher: Released: 25 August 2009; Label: Capo/Eagle	
2010	The Beat Club Sessions: Recorded: 1971/72; Released: 13 September 2010; Label: Capo/Eagle	
2012	The Rory Gallagher Collection (re-release of The Essential Rory Gallagher): Released: 18 June 2012; Label: Capo/Camden Deluxe/Legacy/Sony Music	
2019	Blues: Released: 31 May 2019; Label: Chess/Universal Music	17
2020	The Best of Rory Gallagher: Released: 9 October 2020; Label: Universal Music	--

=== Box sets ===
Year	Album
1992	The G-Man Bootleg Series Vol.1 (3 disc set): Label: Strange Music
2001	Let's Go to Work (4 disc set, featuring Live in Europe, Irish Tour '74, Stage Struck and Meeting with the G-Man): Released: 15 October 2001; Label: Capo/RCA
2008	Original Album Classics (5 disc set, featuring Deuce, Calling Card, Top Priority, Jinx and Fresh Evidence): Released: 31 October 2008; Label: Capo/Sony BMG
2015	I'll Remember: A Box of Taste (4 disc set): Released: August 2015; Label: Polydor

== Singles ==
=== With Taste ===
- "Blister on the Moon" / "Born on the Wrong Side of Time" – UK 1968 ^{[a]}
- "Born on the Wrong Side of Time" / "Same Old Story" – UK/ EU/ JPN, 1969
- "What's Going On" / "Railway and Gun" – EU 1970 ^{[b]} NL #22
- "If I Don't Sing I'll Cry" / "I'll Remember" – ESP 1970
- "Wee Wee Baby" / "You've Got to Play" – GER 1972
- "Blister on the Moon" / "Sugar Mama" / "Catfish" / "On the Boards" – UK 1982

=== Solo ===
- "Moonchild" / Calling Card" – GER/ NL 1977
- "Shadow Play" / "Brute Force and Ignorance" / "Souped-up Ford" – UK/ IRL #24, 1979
- "Philby" / "Hellcat" / "Country Mile" – UK/ EU/ AUS 1979 ^{[c]}
- "Wayward Child" (live) / "Keychain" – UK/ IRL 1980
- "Big Guns" / "The Devil Made Me Do It" – UK/ IRL 1982

notes;

- a – re-released in 1970 with the sides reversed.
- b – b/w "Morning Sun" in some countries.
- c – standard two-track single in some countries.

== Videography ==
All titles released in the DVD format

1995	Message to Love; Recording of "Sinner Boy" and "Gamblin' Blues"; with Taste
2000	Irish Tour '74
2003	The Old Grey Whistle Test: Vol. 1 Album track: "Hands Off"; 1973
2004	At Rockpalast; German release
2005	The Complete Rockpalast Collection; 3 disc, German release
2005	Songs & Stories: New York Remembers Rory Gallagher; Biography
2006	Live at Cork Opera House; UK release
2006	Live in Cork; US release
2006	Live at Montreux; 2 disc set
2007	Live at Rockpalast (5 Concerts 1976 – 1990); 3 disc, US release
2007	Shadow Play (5 Concerts 1976 – 1990); 3 disc, UK release
2010	Ghost Blues; Biography of Gallagher with concert footage and interviews with The Edge, Slash,...

== Guest appearances ==
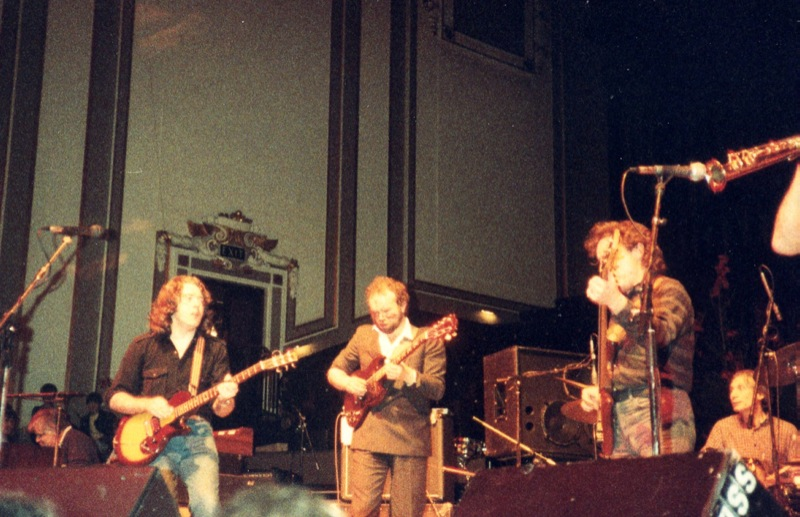
L to R: Gallagher, John Martyn, Jack Bruce, and Charlie Watts in an impromptu performance in 1984. (Present but not pictured: Ian Stewart (piano), Rick Wakeman (keyboards) and Dick Heckstall-Smith (saxophone).

Year	Album	Artist
1971	Bring It Back Home	Mike Vernon
1972	The London Muddy Waters Sessions	Muddy Waters
1973	The Session	Jerry Lee Lewis
1974	Drat That Fratle Rat	Chris Barber
1974	London Revisited	Muddy Waters
1977	Gaodhal's Vision	Joe O'Donnell (electric fiddle player)
1977	Albert Live	Albert King
1978	Tarot Suite	Mike Batt
1978	Puttin' On The Style	Lonnie Donegan
1983	Jammin` With Albert	Albert Collins & The Icebreakers
1984	Box of Frogs	Box of Frogs
1986	Strange Land	Box of Frogs
1989	The Scattering	The Fureys and Davey Arthur
1989	Out of the Air	Davy Spillane Band
1989	Words and Music	Phil Coulter
1990	Shadow Hunter	Davy Spillane
1990	Politician (at Montreux)	Jack Bruce and Rory Gallagher
1991	Flags & Emblems	Stiff Little Fingers
1992	30 Years A-Greying	The Dubliners
1993	The Outstanding	Chris Barber and Band
2007	Kindred Spirits	Eamonn McCormack
