= Notes from San Francisco =

Studio album / Live album by Rory Gallagher
- Released: 17 May 2011
- Recorded: December 1977 (studio album); December 1979 (live album)
- Venue: Old Waldorf, San Francisco, California
- Studio: His Master's Wheels, San Francisco, California
- Genre: Blues rock
- Length: 120:24
- Label: Capo/Legacy/Eagle Rock
- Producer: Elliot Mazer, Daniel Gallagher

Rory Gallagher chronology
Wheels Within Wheels (2003)	Notes from San Francisco (2011)

Notes from San Francisco is a posthumous album by Irish musician Rory Gallagher. Released in 2011, it consists of two CDs. The first disc is a never-released studio album that Gallagher recorded in San Francisco in December 1977; rather than producing this album himself, Gallagher worked with producer Elliot Mazer. However, Gallagher decided to scrap the album, after which he re-recorded and produced some of the songs and released them as the 1978 album Photo-Finish. Shortly before his death, Gallagher reportedly gave his brother Dónal permission to eventually release the original San Francisco versions of the songs if they were remixed. Dónal had his son Daniel remix the songs in 2011. The second disc is a live performance also recorded in San Francisco in December 1979.

== Background ==
The first CD included in Notes from San Francisco is an unreleased studio album by Gallagher. Rather than producing it himself, he hired Elliot Mazer, a successful producer who had a long track record with artists such as Bob Dylan, Janis Joplin and the Band. At the last minute—causing great distress to his manager and brother Dónal and to his record company—Gallagher decided to pull the record. In an interview, Gallagher stated, "it wasn't because of the material or the musicians or anything like that. It was a song thing that I didn't think on the technical side everything worked. So I scrapped the thing". After scrapping the album, Gallagher fired all of his musicians except for his bass player, and hired a new drummer. This new Gallagher power trio re-recorded some the San Francisco songs, and some others, with Gallagher producing and released them as Photo-Finish. Shortly before his death in 1995, Gallagher reportedly gave Dónal permission to one day release the original San Francisco versions of the songs, so long as they were remixed. Dónal had his son Daniel remix the songs in 2011.

The second CD included in Notes from San Francisco is a live performance by Gallagher taken from four nights recorded at the Old Waldorf in San Francisco in December 1979.

== Track listing ==
All songs composed by Rory Gallagher.

Disc one (studio album, 1977)

1. "Rue the Day" – 4:26
2. "Persuasion" – 4:45
3. "B Girl" – 4:42
4. "Mississippi Sheiks" (*) – 5:56
5. "Wheels within Wheels" – 3:40
6. "Overnight Bag" (*) – 4:46
7. "Cruise on Out" (*) – 5:19
8. "Brute Force & Ignorance" (*) – 5:45
9. "Fuel to the Fire" (*) – 5:43
10. "Wheels within Wheels (Alt. Version)" – 3:55
11. "Cut a Dash" – 3:49
12. "Out on the Tiles" – 4:22

(*) These songs were re-recorded and released in the 1978 album Photo-Finish.

Disc two (live performance, 1979)

1. "Follow Me" (from Top Priority) – 6:25
2. "Shinkicker" (from Photo-Finish) – 3:42
3. "Off the Handle" (from Top Priority) – 7:01
4. "Bought and Sold" (from Against the Grain) – 4:43
5. "I'm Leavin'" – 4:35
6. "Tattoo'd Lady" (from Tattoo) – 6:49
7. "Do You Read Me" (from Calling Card) – 6:11
8. "Country Mile" (from Calling Card) – 3:51
9. "Calling Card" (from Calling Card) – 5:51
10. "Shadow Play" (from Photo-Finish) – 5:11
11. "Bullfrog Blues" (from Live in Europe) – 5:38
12. "Sea Cruise" – 3:29

== Personnel ==
Disc one (studio album, 1977)

- Rory Gallagher – guitar, vocals, harmonica
- Gerry McAvoy – bass guitar
- Rod de'Ath – drums, perussion
- Lou Martin – keyboards
- Martin Fiero – saxes on tracks 1 and 8
- Joe O'Donnell – electric violin on track 4

Disc two (live performance, 1979)

- Rory Gallagher – guitar, vocals, and harmonica
- Gerry McAvoy – bass guitar
- Ted McKenna – drums
