= Live at Montreux (Rory Gallagher album) =

Live album by Rory Gallagher
- Released: 31 July 2006
- Recorded: 1975, 1977, 1979, 1985
- Venue: Montreux Jazz Festival, Montreux, Switzerland
- Genre: Blues rock
- Length: 1:15:58
- Label: Eagle
- Producer: Rory Gallagher

Rory Gallagher chronology
Big Guns: The Very Best of Rory Gallagher (2005)	Live at Montreux (2006)	The Essential (2008)

Live at Montreux is a posthumous live album released by Irish blues guitarist Rory Gallagher in 2006. It is a live collection recorded at the Montreux Jazz Festival in 1975, 1977, 1979 and 1985. The CD contains the 12 highlights from those shows.

== Track listing ==
All tracks composed by Rory Gallagher; except where indicated

1. "Laundromat" (1975) [from Rory Gallagher] – 7:49
2. "Toredown" (Sonny Thompson) (1975) – 4:53
3. "I Take What I Want" (1977) [from Against the Grain] – 5:59
4. "Bought and Sold" (1977) [from Against the Grain] – 5:47
5. "Do You Read Me" (1977) [from Calling Card] – 5:48
6. "The Last of the Independents" (1979) [from Photo-Finish] – 5:59
7. "Off The Handle" (1979) [from Top Priority] – 8:27
8. "The Mississippi Sheiks" (1979) [from Photo-Finish] – 5:30
9. "Out On The Western Plain" (Huddie Ledbetter) (1979) [from Against the Grain] – 5:23
10. "Too Much Alcohol" (J.B. Hutto) (1979) – 5:02
11. "Shin Kicker" (1985) [from Photo-Finish] – 7:05
12. "Philby" (1985) [from Top Priority] – 8:16

== Personnel ==
- Rory Gallagher – guitars, vocals
- Gerry McAvoy – bass guitar
- Lou Martin – keyboards (1–5)
- Rod de'Ath – drums, percussion (1–5)
- Ted McKenna – drums (6–10)
- Brendan O'Neill – drums, percussion (11–12)

== Certifications ==
Region	Certification	Certified units/sales
Australia (ARIA)	Gold	7,500^{^}
^{^} Shipments figures based on certification alone.
