= Meeting with the G-Man =

Live album by Rory Gallagher
- Released: 22 November 2003
- Recorded: 20 December 1993
- Venue: Paradiso, Amsterdam, Netherlands
- Genre: Blues rock
- Length: 1:10:39
- Label: Capo/RCA
- Producer: Rory Gallagher

Rory Gallagher chronology
Wheels Within Wheels (2003)	Meeting with the G-Man (2003)	Big Guns: The Very Best of Rory Gallagher (2005)

Meeting with the G-Man is a posthumous live album released by Irish blues guitarist Rory Gallagher in 2003. It is a live collection recorded at the Paradiso in Amsterdam on 20 December 1993. Meeting with the G-Man is an expanded version of this 'bootleg' gig that was previously only available in the 2001 box-set Let's Go to Work & features 14 tracks.

== Track listing ==
All tracks composed by Rory Gallagher; except where indicated

1. "Continental Op" [from Defender] – 6:54
2. "Moonchild" [from Calling Card] – 5:57
3. "Mean Disposition" – 9:03
4. "The Loop" [from Fresh Evidence] – 5:46
5. "Don't Start Me Talkin'" [from Defender] – 7:07
6. "She Moved Thro' The Fair" (Traditional) – 1:07
7. "Out On The Western Plain" (Huddie Ledbetter) [from Against the Grain] – 3:58
8. "William of Green" (Traditional) – 1:36
9. "Mercy River/Amazing Grace" (John Newton) – 2:19
10. "Walkin' Blues" (Robert Johnson) – 5:02
11. "Don't Think Twice, It's Alright" (Bob Dylan) – 2:36
12. "Ghost Blues" [from Fresh Evidence] – 7:15
13. "Messin' with the Kid" (Mel London, Junior Wells) – 6:52
14. "La Bamba" (Traditional; arranged by Ritchie Valens) – 5:12

== Personnel ==
- Rory Gallagher – vocals, guitar
- David Levy – bass guitar
- Jim Leverton – keyboards
- Richard Newman – drums
- Mark Feltham – harmonica
