= Stage Struck (album) =

Live album by Rory Gallagher
- Released: 24 October 1980
- Recorded: November 1979 – July 1980 (Note: sleeve notes)
- Genres: Hard rock; blues rock
- Length: 51:46
- Label: Chrysalis
- Producer: Rory Gallagher

Rory Gallagher chronology
Top Priority (1979)	Stage Struck (1980)	Jinx (1982)

Professional ratings
Review scores
Source	Rating
AllMusic	2.5/5 stars
Q	5/5 stars

Stage Struck is the eleventh album and the third live album by Irish singer/guitarist Rory Gallagher. Released in 1980, it documents his world tour in support of his 1979 album Top Priority, featuring a pair of songs from that album, but it also includes songs from his previous albums. The album sees Gallagher taking a faster-paced, more hard rock sound than on his previous blues-dominated live albums. Originally released with eight tracks, Stage Struck was augmented with two bonus tracks ("Bad Penny" and "Keychain") when reissued in 1999, four years after Gallagher's death, by his younger brother and manager, Dónal Gallagher.

== Reception ==
In 2005, Stage Struck was ranked number 419 in Rock Hard magazine's book of The 500 Greatest Rock & Metal Albums of All Time.

== Track listing ==
All tracks composed by Rory Gallagher.

Side one

1. "Shin Kicker" [from Photo-Finish] – 3:58
2. "Wayward Child" [from Top Priority] – 4:32
3. "Brute Force and Ignorance" [from Photo-Finish] – 4:32
4. "Moonchild" [from Calling Card] – 6:06

Side two

1. "Follow Me" [from Top Priority] – 5:56
2. "Bought and Sold" [from Against the Grain] – 4:39
3. "The Last of the Independents" [from Photo-Finish] – 5:39
4. "Shadow Play" [from Photo-Finish] – 5:08

CD bonus track

1. "Bad Penny" [from Top Priority] – 6:39 (*)
2. "Keychain" [from Top Priority] – 5:03 (*)

== Personnel ==
- Rory Gallagher – guitar, harmonica, vocals
- Gerry McAvoy – bass
- Ted McKenna – drums

Production details

- Rory Gallagher – producer
- Mark Jessett – art direction
