= The G-Man Bootleg Series Vol.1 =

G-Men Bootleg Series Vol.1

Live album by Rory Gallagher
- Released: 7 December 1992
- Genre: Blues rock
- Length: 219:58
- Label: Castle Music
- Producer: Rory Gallagher

Rory Gallagher chronology
Fresh Evidence (1990)	G-Men Bootleg Series Vol.1 (1992)	A Blue Day For The Blues (1995)

G-Men Bootleg Series Vol.1 was Rory Gallagher's last official release before his death in 1995.

== Album profile ==
This album was Gallagher's attempt to bootleg the bootleggers; released in 1992 it was a no-frills exercise with little production work. The three discs were recorded throughout the 1970s. The first two CDs are called "Calling Hard", featuring an entire London gig from 1976/1977, as well as about six tracks live in 1978. The third CD is called "Bullfrog Interlude", featuring a gig for London radio to promote the then forthcoming album, Blueprint from February 1973. The live recording of "The Cuckoo" from this gig was used on Blue Day for the Blues, and also this gig's version of "What in the World" was used for the BBC Sessions live CD. The whole package was sold for the price of one CD.

== Track listing ==
All tracks written by Rory Gallagher except where noted.

=== Calling Hard Part One ===
1. "Messin' with the Kid" (Mel London) - 6:30
2. "Cradle Rock" - 12:10
3. "I Wonder Who" (Muddy Waters) - 9:17
4. "Tattoo'd Lady" - 5:29
5. "(Back On My) Stompin Ground" - 5:25
6. "Who's That Coming" - 6:18
7. "Bullfrog Blues" - 8:56 Traditional
8. "Do You Read Me" - 6:29
9. "Secret Agent" - 6:07
10. "Calling Card" - 8:14

=== Calling Hard Part Two ===
1. "Bought And Sold" - 7:05
2. "Too Much Alcohol" - 4:54 J. B. Hutto
3. "Going To My Hometown" - 5:33
4. "Souped Up Ford" - 6:52
5. "Bullfrog Blues" - 10:49 Traditional
6. "Shinkicker" - 3:11
7. "The Mississippi Sheiks" - 7:23
8. "Do You Read Me" - 8:31
9. "Brute Force And Ignorance" - 5:01
10. "Tattoo'd Lady" - 5:17
11. "Shadow Play" - 6:29
12. "Cruise On Out" - 6:02

=== The Bullfrog Interlude ===
1. "Hands Off" - 5:15
2. "What In The World" - 9:23
3. "Walk On Hot Coals" - 8:23
4. "Banker's Blues" - 3:35 Big Bill Broonzy
5. "Race The Breeze" - 7:30
6. "Hoodoo Blues" - 7:25 Traditional
7. "Bullfrog Blues" - 10:18 Traditional
8. "Toredown" - 5:44 Sonny Thompson
9. "Used To Be" - 5:51
10. "The Cuckoo" - 4:08 Clarence Ashley/Doc Watson

Live At The Paris Theatre, London, 1 February 1973 (tracks 1 to 7)

== Personnel ==
- Rory Gallagher - Vocals, Guitars, Mandolin, Harmonica
- Gerry McAvoy - Bass Guitar

Calling Hard Part One

- Rod de'Ath - Drums, Percussion
- Lou Martin - Piano

Calling Hard Part Two

- Ted McKenna - Drums, Percussion

The Bullfrog Interlude

- Rod de'Ath - Drums, Percussion
- Lou Martin - Piano
