= Rory Gallagher (disambiguation) =

Rory Gallagher (1948–1995) was an Irish guitarist, singer, songwriter, and producer.

The name may also refer to:

- Rory Gallagher (album), the debut solo album by Irish blues rock musician Rory Gallagher
- Rory Gallagher (Gaelic footballer) (born 1978), Gaelic football manager and former player
