= Matt Woosey =

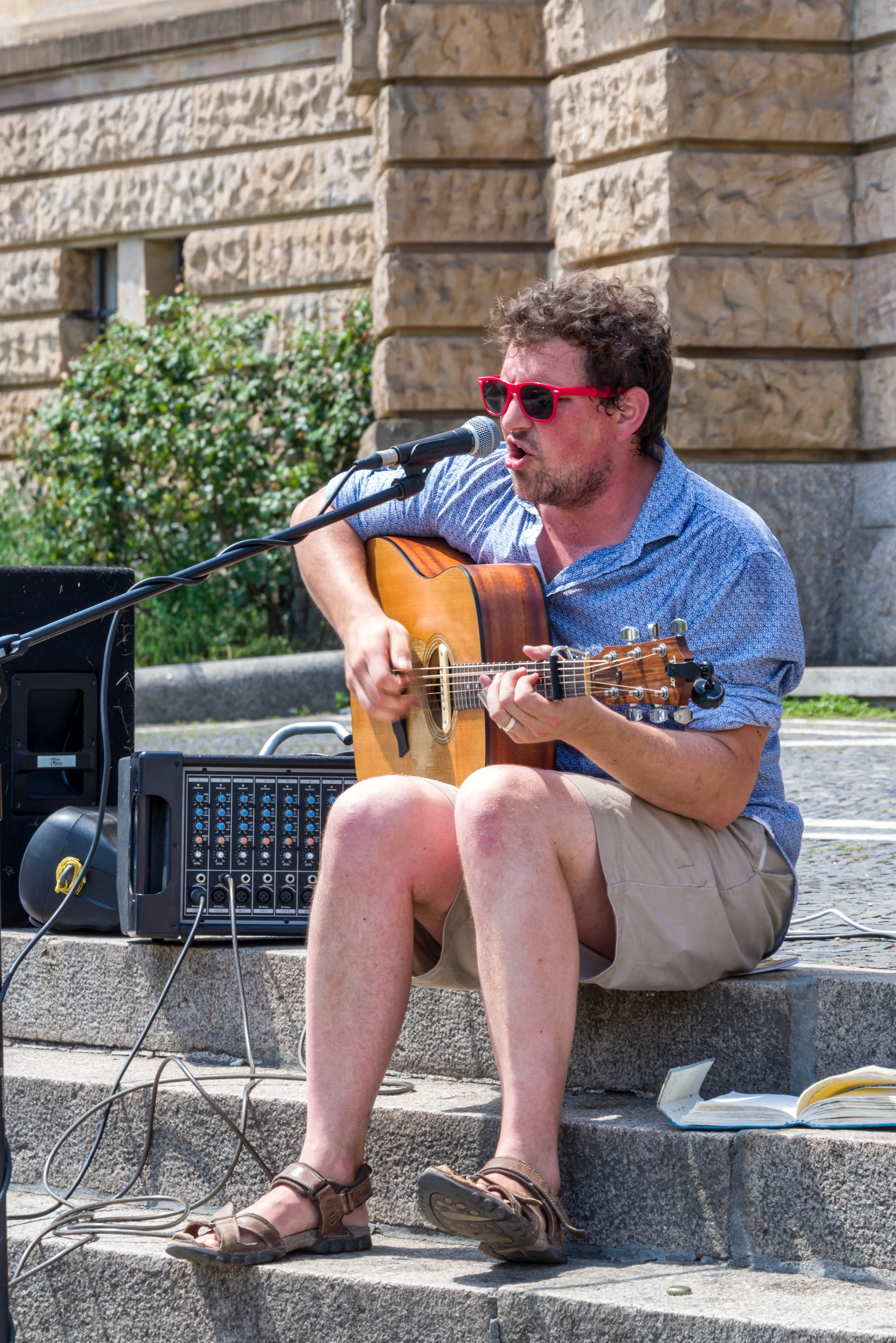
- Matt Woosey playing at the Zelt-Musik-Festival in Freiburg im Breisgau, Germany, in 2017

Background information
- Born: 14 August 1984 (age 42)
- Genres: Blues, rock, folk
- Instruments: Vocals, acoustic guitar, electric guitar, drums
- Years active: 2004–present
- Website: mattwoosey.co.uk

Matt Woosey (born 14 August 1984) is an English songwriter, singer and guitar player of blues, rock, folk, and pop.

== Career ==
Woosey's plays acoustic blues, folk and rock. He has been a musician, songwriter, and singer. He plays acoustic guitar, electric guitar and drums.

Woosey played in a Thin Lizzy tribute band called Black Rose. It had a show in Bristol, England that was named 'Vagabonds of the Western World'. Woosey was the lead guitarist in a Malvern-based band called Taxi. It was featured on local BBC radio shows during its UK tours. In this period Woosey split his time between studying at Keele University and touring with Taxi. Taxi remained unsigned although they recorded several self-released albums. They split in 2005, after which time Woosey went solo and toured throughout the UK.

After leaving university Woosey returned to his family home in Malvern, Worcestershire and formed The Strange Rain, another three-piece band in which he played acoustic guitar. The band featured original songs from Woosey and stayed together for one year producing one album. Following this Woosey carried out a tour of 100 gigs in 100 days. He also busked around the UK and Europe. Around the same time Woosey had an instrumental song featured on BBC series, It's Not Easy Being Green. He remained a solo performer until forming The Matt Woosey Band in 2011. It played several times at London's Ronnie Scott's Jazz Club, and released one album called On The Waggon. Since then, Woosey has toured and recorded with various session musicians and recorded the Hook, Line and Sinker EP and now appears primarily solo, duo (with percussionist Dave Small) or as a three or four-piece band using session musicians.

He was described by Tom Robinson as an "upcoming roots artist from the UK with amazing feel+groove". Paul Jones (BBC Radio 2) featured Woosey in his 2014 Grammy Awards radio show in January that year. Tom Robinson of BBC Radio 6 Music mentioned him on Twitter.

Woosey toured Holland and Europe in 2012. In 2013, Woosey's album On the Waggon, gained coverage on several BBC radio shows in the UK.

In 2014, Woosey was included in Tom Robinson's Fresh on the Net mix session. He also appeared at the Great British Rock & Blues Festival in January 2014 and supported the Brand New Heavies at the Buxton Opera House in February 2014. Later that year, Woosey released a box set, Draw A Line, which included his first five albums. In May 2014, Woosey played with Gerry McAvoy’s Band of Friends in a celebration of the music of Rory Gallagher at the Flowerpot in Derby. In 2014, he toured the UK, Ireland, Germany and Switzerland.

Woosey signed with Robar Music Records (RMR), an independent UK label, in 2014 and released his seventh album, Wildest Dreams through RMR at a launch event in Woosey's home town on 2 November at the Malvern Coach House. The album received reviews in music publications in the UK, France and Canada with radio plays in the same countries and also the US. These included Maverick Magazine (UK), R2 (UK), Blues Matters (UK), Cashbox (Canada), Digital Blues Music (France), Blues & Co (France), on Radio Canut (France), and on WFRG 89.3 (US).

In November 2014, Wildest Dreams was listed as one of four 'Picks of the Month' for November by the IBBA (Independent Blues Broadcasters Association), was number 1 in the IBBA's playlist top 50 for November. In the same month Woosey was voted 'Solo Artist of the Year, 2014' along with Grainne Duffy by the Blues Matters, Writer's Poll.

In 2021, Matt Woosey and his eight-piece Matt Woosey Band were the protagonists of the eighth episode of the German concert film series WeLive. The series is produced by the production company punchline studio and directed by the brothers Maik and Pirmin Styrnol.

== Discography ==
=== With Taxi ===
- Yellow Shark Session (2004)
- Live from the West (2005)
- Live on Mars (2005)

=== With The Strange Rain ===
- Matt Woosey and the Strange Rain (2008)

=== With the Matt Woosey Band ===
- On The Waggon (2012)

=== Solo ===
- Old Smithy (2008)
- White Lies and Black Ice (2009)
- Frame of Mind (2010)
- All Or Nothing (2011)
- Hook, Line and Sinker (2013)
- Wildest Dreams (2014)
- While the Cat's Away (2015)
- Desiderata (2016)

=== Compilation albums ===
- Draw a Line (box set) (2014)

=== DVDs ===
- Head Over Wheels (2011)
- Head Over Wheels II (2014)
