= Nine Below Zero =

British rock band

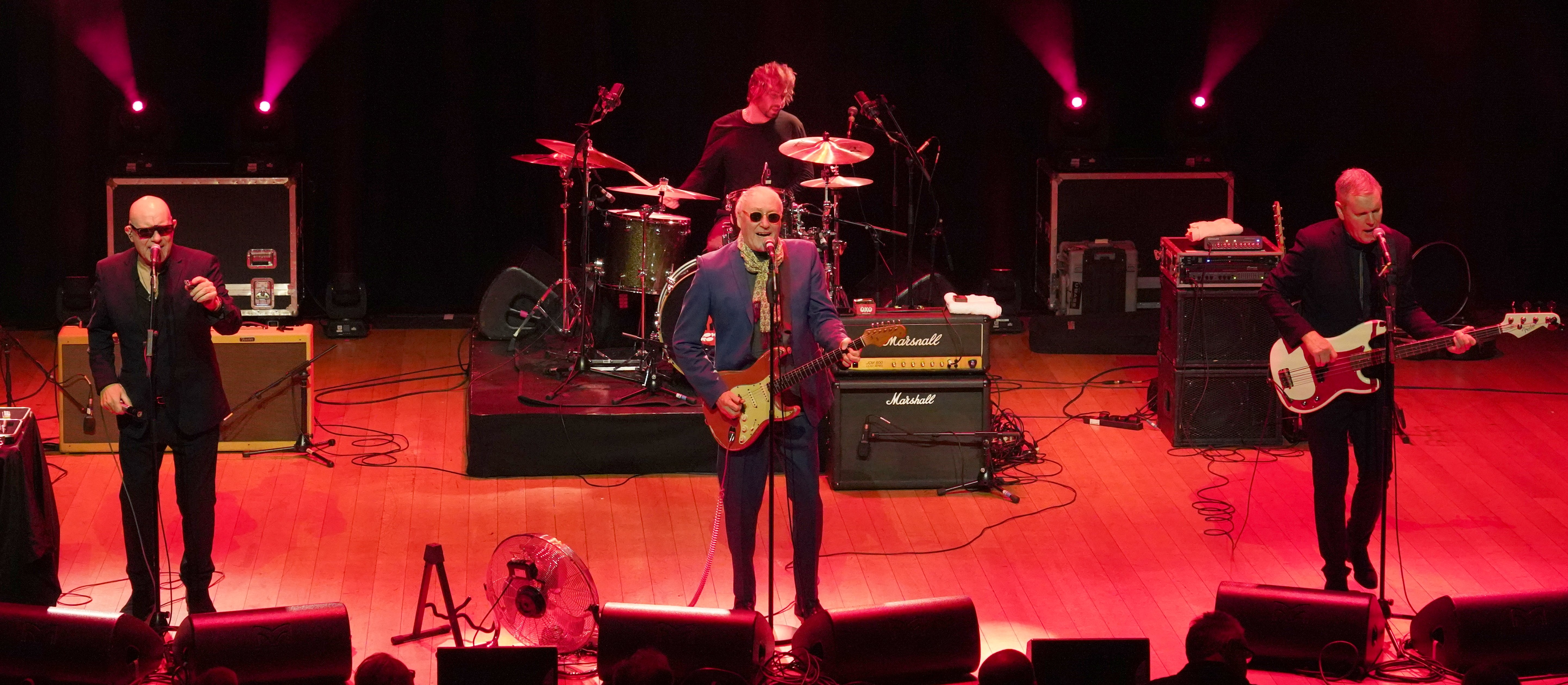
- Nine Below Zero performing in 2023

Background information
- Origin: South London, England
- Genres: Blues rock; pub rock
- Years active: 1977–1983, 1990–present
- Labels: Pangea Recordings, I.R.S. Records, M&L Records, A&M
- Members: Dennis Greaves; Mark Feltham; Charlie Austen; Sonny Greaves; Tom Monks; Anthony Harty
- Past members: Mickey Burkey; Kenny Bradley; Peter Clark; Brian Bethell; Alan Glen; Gerry McAvoy; Andrew Noble; Billy Boy Miskimmin; Brendan O'Neill; Ben Willis
- Website: ninebelowzero.com

Nine Below Zero are an English rock band who have a cult following throughout Europe. They became popular during the period 1980–1982. As of 2026, Nine Below Zero continue to perform live, with scheduled concerts in the United Kingdom, Ireland, Greece and Denmark.

== Career ==
The band was originally formed in South London in 1977 by guitarist and lead vocalist Dennis Greaves. He was joined by bassist Peter Clark, Kenny Bradley on drums, and vocalist and harmonica player Mark Feltham. They were originally named 'Stan's Blues Band' and for the next two years they played in London clubs.

In 1979, while playing at The Thomas A'Beckett pub in the Old Kent Road they accepted an offer from former musician Mickey Modern to manage them. Modern persuaded the band to change their name. Greaves chose Nine Below Zero after the Sonny Boy Williamson II song. Modern was signed to A&M Records and he persuaded A&M to give him a record label, M&L Records, to launch Nine Below Zero.

In 1980 the band released their first album, Live at the Marquee, which was recorded on 16 June 1980. Bradley was replaced as drummer by Stix Burkey. By the end of that year they had built an audience, particularly amongst fans of the new wave of British heavy metal attracted by their high-energy, fast-tempo sound. They headlined at the Hammersmith Odeon and featured Alexis Korner, a long-time champion of new electric blues talent.

In 1981, they released their second album, Don't Point Your Finger, produced by Glyn Johns. Johns complained the bass was too basic for the new songs, so the band subsequently replaced Clark with bass player Brian Bethell. The band appeared on The Chris Tarrant Show, The South Bank Show, O.T.T., The Old Grey Whistle Test, and the BBC2 comedy series The Young Ones performing "11+11". They also supported The Kinks and The Who on tour. Don't Point Your Finger reached number 56 on the UK Albums Chart. Their third album, Third Degree, contained "11+11", written by Greaves and Modern. The album spent six weeks in the chart and peaked at number 38. After this, the band split up. Bethell joined The Blow Monkeys and Feltham went on to session work, most notably for Rory Gallagher. Arnold became manager of The Truth, and he refused Modern's suggestions to re-form Nine Below Zero. In 1990, IRS Records's interest in The Truth was fading, and Modern persuaded Feltham and Greaves to reunite for a tenth-anniversary concert.

Arnold, who now worked at Harvey Goldsmith Ents, promoted the band at the Town and Country Club. They added Gerry McAvoy and Brendan O'Neill from Rory Gallagher's band on bass and drums. In 1992, Feltham left due to musical differences and was replaced by Alan Glen. Feltham returned in 2001 and the band has continued to tour and record. In 1995, harmonica player Billy Boy Miskimmin was added.

In 2005, their track "Go Girl" was included in the Of Hands and Hearts: Music for the Tsunami Disaster Fund compilation album. In 2007, Nine Below Zero performed two acoustic concerts, producing the DVD Bring It On Home, including a live CD. Blues guitarist Gary Moore joined the band on stage to promote the DVD. In August 2008, Nine Below Zero appeared at the Rhythm Festival in Bedfordshire and later opened for Chuck Berry at The 100 Club. In 2009, the band started working towards a show to celebrate the 30th anniversary of the release of their debut album, Live at the Marquee.

Glenn Tilbrook from Squeeze offered to record the album that Greaves and Feltham had been writing. They recorded It's Never Too Late—their first collection of new songs since Refrigerator. European tours followed, including supporting Jools Holland and Paul Jones.

In 2011, they worked with Tilbrook under the name The Co-operative. In July 2011, one track, the Beatles song "You Never Give Me Your Money", was used on a Mojo magazine special celebrating the 40th anniversary of the release of Abbey Road. The band were preparing for a tour in 2012. Gerry McAvoy left at the end of 2011 to pursue a solo career.

Former bass player Brian Bethell died from heart failure in April 2024, at the age of 74.

== Recent work ==
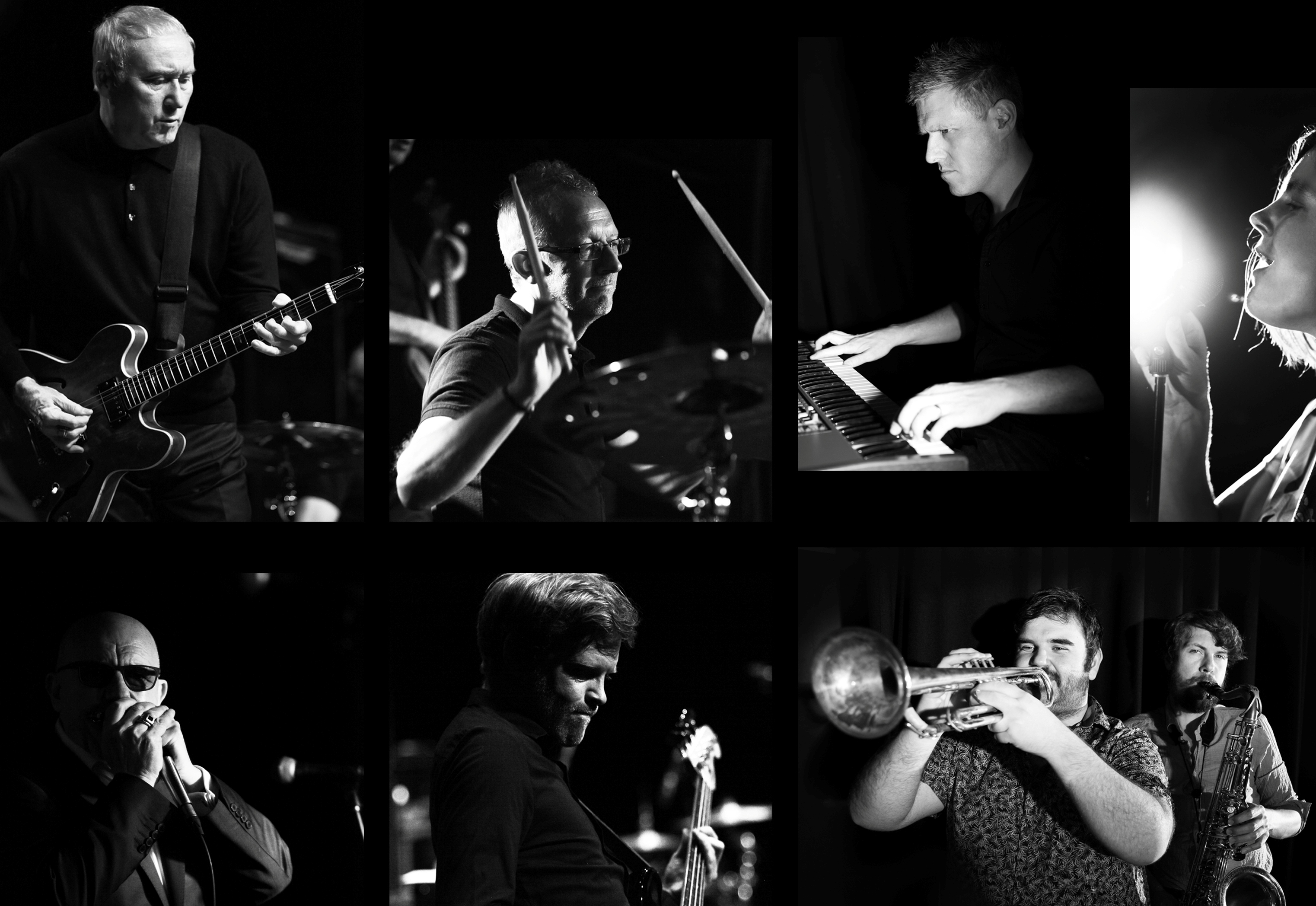
Nine Below Zero in 2017

2012 saw the return of Brian Bethell who played on Third Degree. The new lineup started performing in January with shows in Germany, Switzerland and Austria, as the band enter their 35th year.

Following on from 2012's remastered re-release of Nine Below Zero's live debut Live at the Marquee came a double instalment; remastered editions of the first two studio albums Don't Point Your Finger and Third Degree, each with a separate disc of bonus material, was released on 24 February 2014 through Universal Music.

A nationwide month-long 22-date tour in support of The Stranglers began on 27 February 2014. The band then undertook a 35th Anniversary tour in Autumn 2014. The second half of 2016 saw the release of the band's first "big band" album, this new line made their live debut at Glastonbury Festival in June after which the big band toured extensively through the autumn and beyond. On 27 October 2018, the band played King George's Hall, Blackburn, supporting Bruce Foxton's From The Jam, with Russell Hastings performing lead vocals with songs from The Jam's All Mod Cons.

They began touring again 12th Nov 2026 - Soul Mama, Islington, with a list of 44 dates across the U.K. and Europe.

== Members ==
=== Current ===
- Dennis Greaves – vocals and guitar (1977–1983, 1990–present)
- Mark Feltham – harmonica and vocals (1977–1983, 1990–1992, 2001–present)
- Charlie Austen – vocals and percussion (2016–2018, 2019–present)
- Sonny Greaves – drums (2018–present)
- Tom Monks – keyboards, guitar and vocals (2019–present)
- Anthony Harty – bass and vocals (2022–present)

=== Former ===
- Pete Clark – bass (1977–1981)
- Kenney Bradley – drums (1977–1980)
- Mickey 'Stix' Burkey – drums (1980–1983, 2015–2018)
- Brian Bethell – bass (1981–1983, 2012–2016)
- Gerry McAvoy – bass (1990–2011)
- Brendan O'Neill – drums (1990–2015)
- Alan Glen – harmonica (1992–1995)
- Billy Boy Miskimmin – harmonica (1995–2000)
- Ben Willis – bass (2016–2022)

== Discography ==
=== Albums ===
- Live at the Marquee – 1980 – A&M
- Don't Point Your Finger – 1981 – A&M (No. 56 UK)
- Third Degree – 1982 – A&M (No. 38 UK)
- Live at the Venue – 1989 – Receiver
- On The Road Again – 1991 – China Records
- Off The Hook – 1992 – China Records
- Special Tour Album 93 – 1993 – China Records (LP only)
- Hot Music for a Cold Night – 1994 – Pangea Records
- Back To The Future – 1994 – China Records
- Ice Station Zebro – 1995 – Pangea Records
- Live in London – 1997 – Indigo
- Refrigerator – 2000 – Zed Records
- Give Me No Lip Child – 2000 – Indigo
- Chilled – 2002 – Zed Records
- Hat's Off – 2005 – Zed Records
- Both Sides of Nine Below Zero – 2008 – Angel Air
- It's Never Too Late! – 2009 – Zed Records
- The Co-Operative (with Glenn Tilbrook) – 2011 – Quixotic Records
- Live at the Marquee [CD/DVD] – 2012 – UMC/Mercury
- A to Zed – The Very Best of – 2013 – Zed Records
- Don't Point Your Finger [2CD Expanded Edition] – 2014 – UMC
- Third Degree [2CD Expanded Edition] – 2014 – UMC
- 13 Shades of Blue – 2016 – Zed Records
- Avalanche – 2019 – Zed Records

== See also ==
- List of bands named after other performers' songs
