= Si Hayden =

Background information
- Born: 5 December 1974 (age 51)
- Origin: England
- Genres: Jazz, Jazz fusion, Instrumental rock, Progressive rock, Folk, Fingerstyle guitar, Drum & Bass, Flamenco,
- Occupations: Musician, composer, producer
- Instruments: Guitar, Piano, Double Bass, Bass
- Years active: 1998-present
- Labels: Silvery, Sid Norris, Liquid Note, I'm Not A Machine, Tigre Fair Records, RNA, Yibbit
- Website: www.sihayden.com

Si Hayden is an English musician and long time guitarist of 70's electric violin veteran Joe O'Donnell of East Of Eden, Headstone and Rory Gallagher fame. He has released over 60 albums of largely original material, featured on multiple guitar compilations with the likes of Alex De Grassi, Guns N' Roses guitarist Bumblefoot and Will Ackerman. He has recorded as a guest musician on over 100 releases. On the release of his 2011 solo guitar album Supercharger, Guitarist Magazine described him as 'an acoustic virtuoso'.

== Career ==
Hayden has performed and recorded with artists such as John Etheridge, Gilad Atzmon as guitarist in the 'Atzmob', Clive Carroll and Soweto Kinch. Other groups have included The Morley Hayden Haines trio who performed at The Guinness Cork Jazz Festival in 2009 and BBC1 television appearances with Rob Halligan. Si is also a founder member of 91db who released their debut album 'Waiting' in 2010, their next release was a remix that appeared on Rik Mayall's Noble England EP. The single from the EP reached number one in the Official UK Independent Charts in 2014.

== Discography ==
=== Solo albums ===
- 1998: Steel Happenings (Ray Craig Records)
- 1999: Chasing Light (Unknown)
- 2001: 2001: A Bass Odyssey (Unknown)
- 2005: Live in '05 at the Coventry Jazz Festival (Unknown)
- 2006: Nylon... for Now (Silvery Records)
- 2007: Steel Roots (Silvery Records)
- 2007: Live Like Us (Silvery Records)
- 2008: Scenes from the City (Silvery Records)
- 2009: The apparent rules of thumb (Silvery Records)
- 2009: Sabaca (Silvery Records)
- 2010: The Mysteries (Silvery Records)
- 2010: FdWN (Silvery Records)
- 2010: Counterfeit (Silvery Records)
- 2011: Spoilt For Choice (Silvery Records)
- 2011: Live at The Hinckley Act Folk Club (Silvery Records)
- 2011: Supercharger (Silvery Records)
- 2012: Don't Fret (Solo Fretless Guitar) (Silvery Records)
- 2012: A Fistful Of Grooves (Silvery Records)
- 2013: Arbitrary Notes Of Reason (Silvery Records)
- 2014: Vivaldi: The Four Seasons (Solo Guitar) (Silvery Records)
- 2015: Piano Wears Black & Howls At The Moon (Silvery Records)
- 2015: The Immutable Acoustic (Silvery Records)
- 2015: Live at Coventry Cathedral (Silvery Records)
- 2015: Four Corners Of Acoustic (Four Disc Box Set) (Silvery Records)
- 2015: Tales From The Acoustic Vault (Silvery Records)
- 2016: Into The Abyss (Silvery Records)
- 2016: Tales of Midnight Bass (Silvery Records)
- 2017: Deeper Into The Abyss (Silvery Records)
- 2017: Wired (Leaked demo)
- 2017: All Is Flux (Silvery Records)
- 2017: Live at the Guildhall (Silvery Records)
- 2018: Sea of Dreams (Silvery Records)
- 2018: Re-Wired (Silvery Records)
- 2018: Return from the Abyss (Silvery Records)
- 2018: Outpost (Silvery Records)
- 2018: The Dancing Bird (Silvery Records)
- 2018: Jupiter (Silvery Records)
- 2018: Out of Place (Silvery Records)
- 2018: Existence (Silvery Records)
- 2019: Life Form (Silvery Records)
- 2019: The Water's Edge (Silvery Records)
- 2019: Waiting Room (Silvery Records)
- 2019: Swim on By (Silvery Records)
- 2019: Guitar Tree Hill (Silvery Records)
- 2019: Bass Wears Red & Laughs Like a Crow (SiHaydenMusic)

=== Collaborations ===
- 2008: BACKRA MeN (Silvery Records)
- 2010: Live at the Guinness Cork Jazz Festival (Silvery Records)
- 2010: Pianose (Silvery Records)
- 2010: Sunrise (Silvery Records)
- 2010: Mille Miglia (Silvery Records)
- 2011: The Backra Instrumentals (Silvery Records)
- 2012: H-Division (Silvery Records)
- 2015: Casino (Silvery Records)
- 2016: Live at the HinckleyACT with David MacGregor (Silvery Records)
- 2017: Process (Silvery Records)
- 2019: Production (Silvery Records)

=== Compilation albums ===
- 2007: The Alchemist Vol II (Liquid Note Records)
- 2007: FMN2 Concert for Pete (Charity CD Feat Kevin Rowland)
- 2014: The Best Of Reviews New Age: The Guitar (RNA-Records)
- 2014: C-Fab Official Festival Album (Warren Records)
- 2015: Specialized-4 A Tribute to The Clash (Specialized Records)

=== As A Band Member ===
- 2009: Trust Again (Silvery Records)
- 2009: Step Forwards (Silvery Records)
- 2010: Waiting (Silvery Records)
- 2010: Noble England EP (Motivation Records)
- 2010: Noel Nouvelet (Sid Norris Records)
- 2010: The Journey Live at Playwrights (Silvery Records)
- 2010: This Mess (Silvery Records)
- 2012: Running Away (Ratty and Tango Remix) (dbeats records)
- 2013: Sonomama (LucyAnneSale)
- 2013: Into The Becoming (Silvery Records)
- 2015: O'Neil's Lament (Silvery Records)

=== With other artists ===
- 2006: Dark Clouds Fighting (Blatant Records)
- 2007: If your standing, your fair game (Rhetoric Records)
- 2009: Welcome to Suburbia (Force 8Records)
- 2010: Mainly Blue (Silvery Records)
- 2011: The Perils the Grace and the Way (Blatant Records)
- 2012: The Tales Of Seven Guitars (Blatant Records)
- 2012: Evolve (feat. Miss Coco Brown) (PRECHA Records)
- 2012: A Song Yet Sung (Part One) (Silvery Records)
- 2013: A Song Yet Sung (Part Two) (Silvery Records)
- 2013: The Bedouin
- 2013: Bedouin Sister
- 2013: Dark
- 2014: Heaven's Statues
- 2014: Hashtag (Fly Beat Music)
- 2014: Tatami High
- 2014: An Album
- 2014: Battle Cry
- 2014: Subway Scene
- 2014: Jamside Up
- 2015: Molly's Bones
- 2015: Oblivious Fish (Yibbit Records)
- 2015: Voodoo In Blue
- 2015: Reverie (Sheila-Waterfield-Music)
- 2015: Almost Strong Enough (I'm Not A Machine Music)
- 2015: The Future Is Ours (Tigre Fair Records)

=== Film/TV/Radio ===
- 2003: Tonight I Write by Manjinder Virk "Barcelona" (BBC Radio 4)
- 2008: Live Like Us Soundtrack (Belgrade Theatre Production DVD)
- 2008: Dockers Soundtrack (Belgrade Theatre Production DVD)
- 2009: Chosen Soundtrack (Belgrade Theatre Production DVD)
- 2010: Big School Soundtrack (Belgrade Theatre Production DVD)
- 2011: Where Sweeter Rains Fall With Rob Halligan (©BBC Television)
- 2011: Live at The Hinckley Act Folk Club Live Concert (DVD)
- 2011: Reel Dreams Soundtrack (Feature Film Documentary)
- 2014: Uncle Bob Soundtrack (Animated Film Short/OneNationStudios)

=== Theatre Score ===
- 2007: Live Like Us (Belgrade Theatre Production)
- 2007: Scenes from the City (Belgrade Theatre Production)
- 2008: The first time I saw snow (Belgrade Theatre Production)
- 2008: Now you see me, now you don't (Belgrade Theatre Production)
- 2009: The Mystery Plays (Belgrade Theatre Production)
- 2010: Immigration: In our own words (Belgrade Theatre Production)
- 2010: All the moves (Belgrade Theatre Production)
- 2011: Promise (Belgrade Theatre Production)
- 2011: Article 30 (Belgrade Theatre Production)
- 2011: Spring Awakening (Belgrade Theatre Production)
- 2012: Becoming Me (Belgrade Theatre Production)
- 2014: The Tempest (Belgrade Theatre Production)
- 2015: Inspiring Curiosity (Belgrade Theatre Production)

=== Books (Featured In) ===
- 2014: Fretless Guitar: The Definitive Guide ISBN 978-0-9931459-0-2.
