= Don't Point Your Finger =

Studio album by Nine Below Zero
- Released: 27 February 1981
- Studio: Olympic, Barnes, London
- Genre: Blues rock, R&B, mod revival
- Label: A&M
- Producer: Glyn Johns

Nine Below Zero chronology
Live at the Marquee (1980)	Don't Point Your Finger (1981)	Third Degree (1982)

Don't Point Your Finger is an album by the English band Nine Below Zero, released on 27 February 1981. "Three Times Enough" was released as a single. The album peaked at No. 56 in the UK Albums Chart. The band supported it by opening for the Who on a few United Kingdom concert dates.

== Production ==
Recorded at Olympic Studios, the album was produced, engineered, and mixed by Glyn Johns. Nine Below Zero spent 15 days in the studio, including the time it took to mix the album. "Treat Her Right" is a cover of the Roy Head song. "Rockin' Robin" is a version of the song made famous by Bobby Day. The version of "Sugar Mama" was influenced by Howlin' Wolf's take.

== Critical reception ==
Professional ratings
Review scores
Source	Rating
AllMusic	4/5 stars
Classic Rock	3.5/5 stars
The Encyclopedia of Popular Music	3/5 stars
Omaha World-Herald	3.5/5 stars
Rolling Stone	4/5 stars

In its syndicated newspaper column, Rolling Stone likened the band to a "British J. Geils" and noted that "like most white blues units, Nine Below Zero lacks a really exceptional vocalist". The New Standard compared Nine Below Zero to "John Mayall and early Fleetwood Mac". The Liverpool Echo opined that Mark Feltham "is one of the best harp players to emerge in the last decade". The Cambridge Evening News noted that the band put "a 1981 stamp on blues classics ... without using straight imitation." The Telegraph & Argus concluded that "the lyrics are the weak points". The Swindon Advertiser praised the "hard, fast and earthy" R&B.

The Trouser Press Record Guide considered Don't Point Your Finger to be a "transitional album" and opined that the songs "sound authentically old". AllMusic said, "Nine Below Zero show themselves as sharp players with plenty of hooks up their sleeves. Stix Burkey and Peter Clark whack out a disciplined rhythm attack without fussiness or flourishes, leaving the interplay to singer/harpist Mark Feltham and the main songwriter, lead guitarist Dennis 'The Menace' Greaves. Greaves' tunes successfully execute '60s R&B toughness, yet are updated enough to grace a teen scooter fanatic's good books." Classic Rock stated that Johns "gave the band a muscular sound retaining much of the rawness of their live shows."

== Track listing ==
No.	Title	Length
1.	"One Way Street"
2.	"Doghouse"
3.	"Liquor Lover"
4.	"Helen"
5.	"Ain't Comin' Back"
6.	"I Won't Lie"
7.	"Treat Her Right"
8.	"Three Times Enough"
9.	"Sugar Mama"
10.	"Don't Point Your Finger at the Guitar Man"
11.	"Rockin' Robin"
12.	"You Can't Please All the People All the Time"
