= BBC Sessions (Rory Gallagher album) =

Compilation album by Rory Gallagher
- Released: 1999
- Recorded: 1971–1986
- Genre: Rock; blues
- Length: 61:28 (live), 65:21 (studio)
- Label: Capo

Rory Gallagher chronology
Etched In Blue (1998)	BBC Sessions (1999)	Wheels Within Wheels (2003)

Professional ratings
Review scores
Source	Rating
Allmusic	4/5 stars

BBC Sessions is a blues rock album by Rory Gallagher, released in 1999. The album was compiled from live recordings made at the BBC by Gallagher's brother Dónal and released posthumously.

== Background ==
From the earliest stages of Gallagher's career, the BBC played an important part in shaping his musicianship. As a boy, he refused to go outside if it meant missing the Saturday Club and rushing home for this four o'clock programme which dedicated half an hour to a different group each week. The young Gallagher considered these broadcasts a test to see if bands could demonstrate the same musicianship in a spontaneous performance as in the studio. Starting with his first band Taste, Gallagher had an excellent relationship with Mike Raven and John Peel at BBC radio. It was for Peel that Gallagher recorded the songs in this collection. To an artist who opposed releasing singles, the sessions collected here on this compilation proved invaluable in allowing his music to reach new fans. The release was greeted with moderately good reviews from the music press and acclamation from Gallagher's fans.

== Track listing ==
All tracks written by Rory Gallagher; except where noted.

=== In concert ===
1. "Calling Card" – 8:25
2. "What in the World" (Traditional; arr. by Gallagher) – 9:17
3. "Jacknife Beat" – 8:59
4. "Country Mile" – 3:17
5. "Got My Mojo Working" (Preston Foster) – 5:17
6. "Garbage Man" – 5:54 (Willie Hammond)
7. "Roberta" – 2:37 (Traditional; arranged by Gallagher)
8. "Used to Be" – 4:59
9. "I Take What I Want" – 6:57 (David Porter, Mabon Hodges, Isaac Hayes)
10. "Cruise On Out" – 5:48

CD 1 recorded at : 1-1, 1-3 & 1-9 Golders Green Hippodrome, London (January 20, 1977) 1-2 Paris Theatre, London (February 1, 1973) 1-4, 1-5 & 1-8 Hammersmith Odeon, London (January 13, 1979) 1-6 & 1-7 De Montfort Hall, Leicester, UK (1978) 1-10 The Venue, London (September 20, 1979)

=== Studio ===
1. "Race the Breeze" – 6:53
2. "Hands Off" – 4:58
3. "Crest of a Wave" – 3:57
4. "Feel So Bad" – 4:58 (Chuck Willis)
5. "For the Last Time" – 4:13
6. "It Takes Time" – 4:28 (Traditional; arranged by Gallagher)
7. "Seventh Son of a 7th Son" – 7:59
8. "Daughter of the Everglades" – 6:12
9. "They Don't Make Them Like You" – 3:58
10. "Tore Down" – 5:14 (Sonny Thompson)
11. "When My Baby She Left Me" – 5:00 (John Lee Curtis Williamson)
12. "Hoodoo Man" – 7:23 (Traditional; arranged by Gallagher)

CD 2 recorded at Maida Vale Studios and Broadcasting House ( Portland Place ), London : 2-1 & 2-2 (February 5, 1973) 2-3 (November 24, 1971) 2-4 (July 10, 1972) 2-5 (April 15, 1971) 2-6 (July 19, 1971) 2-7 & 2-8 (February 21, 1973) 2-9 (June 19, 1974) except 2-10 & 2-12 Paris Theatre, London (July 13, 1972) 2-11 BBC Manchester (March 20, 1986)

== Personnel ==
- Rory Gallagher – vocals, guitar, harmonica
- Gerry McAvoy – bass guitar
- Lou Martin – keyboards

=== In concert ===
- Rod de'Ath – drums on tracks 1–9
- Ted McKenna – drums on track 10

=== Studio ===
- Wilgar Campbell – drums on tracks 3, 5, 6, 10 & 12
- Rod de'Ath – drums on tracks 1–2, 4 & 7–9
- Brendan O'Neill – drums on track 11
