= Gary Fletcher (musician) =

British blues musician

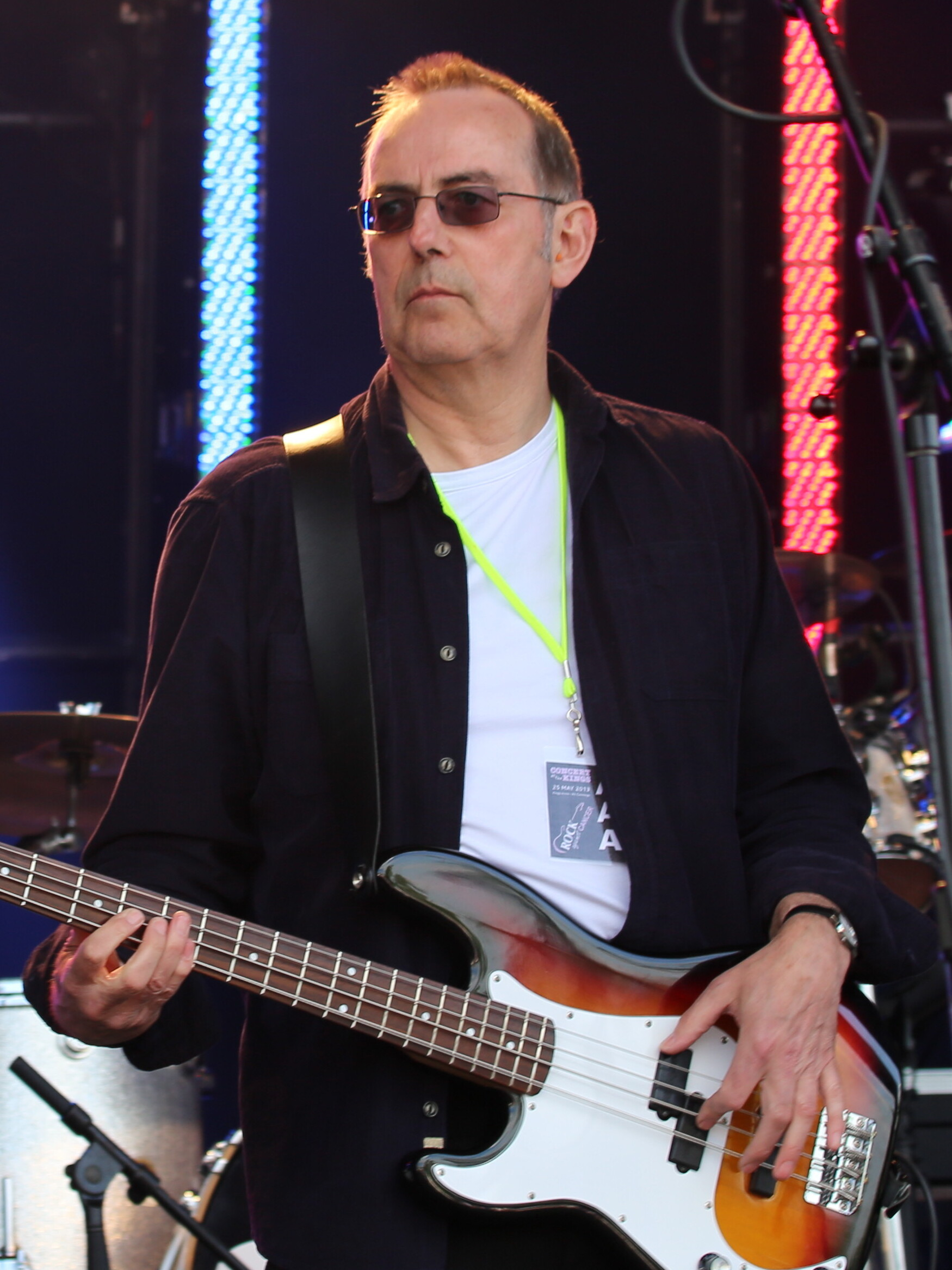
- Fletcher with The Blues Band in 2013

Background information
- Born: London, England
- Genre: Blues
- Occupations: Instrumentalist, songwriter
- Instruments: Bass guitar, guitar
- Website: www.garyfletchermusic.co.uk

Gary Fletcher is a British blues musician, known for playing bass guitar with The Blues Band. He is also a songwriter.

== Early life ==
Born in London in the early 1950s, he became interested in blues music in the late 1960s, so he learnt to play his sister's acoustic guitar. Being left-handed, he turned the guitar over, without reversing the strings, so he learnt and continues to play "upside-down".

After his first band, The Breath of Life, he played in Streatham folk-rock band Garfield Row, who were helped by Glenn Cornick. After playing in several blues, folk-rock and country bands, he ended up playing and writing for rock band Panama Scandal. He joined blues band Sam Apple Pie in the mid-1970s, after they had already recorded both their albums, and shortly before they became The Vipers.

Fletcher and his friend Steve Gurl, who had played with Cornick in Wild Turkey, won a recording contract, whilst Fletcher, Gurl and Fletcher's wife Hilary, also won a publishing contract.

== Career ==
=== The Blues Band ===
In 1978, Fletcher joined The Wildcats led by Wilgar Campbell (Rory Gallagher's ex-drummer), where he met Dave Kelly. Kelly invited him to play bass on his album Willing, and suggested Fletcher as bassist when Kelly, Paul Jones, Tom McGuinness and Hughie Flint formed The Blues Band in 1979. Fletcher has remained with The Blues Band from its inception.

Fletcher has written several numbers for the Blues Band, notably "Green Stuff" from the 1980 album Ready, which is still a common encore, and "Stepping Out On Main" from the album Stepping Out.

=== Side projects ===
As well as The Blues Band, Fletcher has also undertaken side projects, writing and recording with other musicians, including The Dave Kelly Band and Christine Collister, Dave Kelly & The Travelling Gentlemen.

He formed The Relatives, with his wife Hilary, who released the Feud of Love album on Arone Records in 1997. The Relatives also played live, supplemented by Hilary's sister Vivien on vocals and Fletcher's son Jack on drums.

He formed The Gary Fletcher Band, a semi-acoustic band featuring Gary on acoustic and electric guitars, his son Jack on bass, John Evans on lead guitar and, depending on availability, Rob Townsend, Don James, or Pick Withers on drums/percussion. They are occasionally joined by Mark Feltham on harmonica. Their album Human Spirit (BGOCD 780) also included contributions from Bernie Marsden, Micky Moody, Dave Kelly and Paul Jones.

In 2007, Dave Sharp and Henry McCullough invited Fletcher to join the first line-up of The Hard Travelers, a band they formed to play Woody Guthrie songs. The first line-up also included keyboardist Zoot Money and drummer Colin Allen, but later became a Sharpe/McCullough duo.

His son Jack was hospitalised after a major accident, and played music to help his recovery. Gary joined him to perform for the patients, and once Jack was released, they played at local parties and pubs as The Fletchers. Both of them sing, and play guitar and bass, but The Fletchers appearances are limited by Gary's commitment to The Blues Band and The Gary Fletcher Band, and Jack's appearances as drummer for Aphid.

Fletcher has also appeared solo, releasing The Official Gary Fletcher Bootleg Album (Hypertension HYP4227) which includes original versions of several songs he wrote for The Blues Band, and recorded a session for BBC Radio 2 broadcast in March 2005.

=== Current ===
Currently, Fletcher performs live with Dave Kelly, Pick Withers, Pete Emery and Zoot Money as The British Blues Allstars.

== Personal life ==
Outside of music Fletcher is a keen racing driver, although he only took this up in his mid-40s. Initially competing in the 1995/1996 Ford Credit Fiesta Challenge, his first win came in July 1998 at Castle Combe in the Proton Coupe Cup and he came third overall in the 1999 Championship. As music commitments limit the number of races he can compete in, he became a racing instructor.

== Discography ==
=== Solo/Gary Fletcher Band ===
- Official Gary Fletcher Bootleg Album (2004)
- Human Spirit (2007)
- Giant From The Blue, Gary Fletcher Band (2011)
- In Solitary (2015)

=== With Dave Kelly ===
- Willing (1979)
- Feels Right (1981)
- Dave Kelly Band Live (1983)
- Mind In A Glass (1984)
- Making Whoopee - 1979/1982 (1993) Compilation album of Feels Right-time. Fletcher does not play bass on every song.
- Waiting For Bessie - 1984/1987 (1997) Compilation of Mind In A Glass/Heart Of The City - Dave Kelly Band's albums. Fletcher plays bass only on Mind In A Glass. Tex Comer is bass player on Heart Of The City.

=== With Christine Collister, Dave Kelly and the Travelling Gentlemen ===
- Live (2008)

=== With The British Blues All Stars ===
- Live at the Notodden Blues Festival (2007)

=== With The Blues Band ===
- Official Bootleg Album (1980)
- Ready (1980)
- Itchy Feet (1981)
- Brand Loyalty (1982)
- Bye Bye Blues (1983)
- These Kind of Blues (1987)
- Back For More (1989)
- Fat City (1991)
- Homage (1993)
- Wire Less (1995)
- 18 Years Old and Live (1997) : rerelease: Live In Poland (2002)
- Brassed Up (1999)
- Scratching My Screen (2000)
- Greenstuff Live at BBC 1982 (2001)
- Stepping out (2002)
- Few Short Lines (2011)

Compilations

- Best of the Blues Band (1999)
- Itchy Feet/Brand Loyalty (Reissue) (2001)
- Official Bootleg Album/Ready (Reissue) (2001)
- Be My Guest (2004)
- Thank You Brother Ray (2004)
- Best of the Blues Band (2005)
- Blues Band Box (2005)
