= Live in Europe (Rory Gallagher album) =

Live! in Europe

Live album by Rory Gallagher
- Released: May 1972
- Recorded: February–March 1972
- Genre: Blues rock
- Length: 45:42
- Label: Polydor
- Producer: Rory Gallagher

Rory Gallagher chronology
Deuce (1971)	Live! in Europe (1972)	Blueprint (1973)

Live! in Europe is the third album by Irish blues guitarist Rory Gallagher, released in 1972. It is a series of live recordings made during his European tour that year. Unusual for a live album, it contains only two songs previously recorded and released by Gallagher ("Laundromat" and "In Your Town"). The other songs are either new Gallagher songs or Gallagher's interpretation of traditional blues songs.

== Recording ==
Live! in Europe was released at the end of the British "blues boom" that began in the 1960s. Sparked by bands such as the Rolling Stones, Yardbirds and Cream, fans and musicians were fascinated by authentic Chicago blues artists such as Muddy Waters. Gallagher had an extensive knowledge of this kind of music, although he tended to play down arguments about what was "pure" blues. In an interview at the time he said:

If there was one fault with the boom in the 1960s, it was that it was very straight-faced and very pontificatory, or whatever the word is. It used to annoy me that there was an attitude of 'Thou shalt not play the blues unless you know who played second acoustic guitar behind Sonny Boy Williamson the first on the B-side of whatever.' That kind of thing gets music nowhere, it’s like collecting stamps. I mean, I buy books on the blues and I check out the B-sides and I know who plays on what records and that’s fine. But then you’ve got to open that up to the rest of the people. Because that kind of snobbery defeats the purpose; it kills the music.

Rather than live versions of his most popular songs, there are only two songs on the album that were previously recorded by Gallagher in the studio, "Laundromat" from his first album and "In Your Town" from his Deuce album. All the other songs are Gallagher's versions of classic blues songs. The album starts with what was to become a signature song for Gallagher, Junior Wells' "Messin' With the Kid". The song "I Could've Had Religion" was Gallagher's salute to what he called the "redemption style blues" of the Robert Wilkins and Gary Davis. After hearing the song on this album Bob Dylan expressed interest in recording it and assumed it was a traditional blues number rather than an original song by Gallagher.

Blind Boy Fuller's "Pistol Slapper Blues" is next. Gallagher then shows his versatility, swapping his Stratocaster for a mandolin and performing the song "Going to My Hometown" with the audience stomping their feet and cheering in response as Gallagher sings "do you want to go?". The finale is the straight-ahead hard rocking "Bullfrog Blues" written by William Harris. Gallagher switches back to the electric guitar and the full band and gives bassist Gerry McAvoy and drummer Wilgar Campbell, a chance to solo. With the CD release, two additional blues songs were added: "What in the World" and "Hoodoo Man".

== Critical reception and charts ==
Professional ratings
Review scores
Source	Rating
AllMusic	4.5/5 stars
Uncut	9/10

Most critics agree that Live! in Europe is one of Gallagher's finest albums. Upon release, it entered the top ten album chart in the UK. It was Gallagher's highest charting album to date reaching 101 in the Billboard 200 for 1972. The album was his first major commercial success and his first solo top ten album. It won him his first Gold Disc.

== Track listing ==
Side one

1. "Messin' with the Kid" (written by Mel London, originally recorded by Junior Wells) – 6:25
2. "Laundromat" (Rory Gallagher) [from Rory Gallagher] – 5:12
3. "I Could've Had Religion" (Gallagher) – 8:35
4. "Pistol Slapper Blues" (Blind Boy Fuller) – 2:54

Side two

1. "Going to My Hometown" (Gallagher) – 5:46
2. "In Your Town" (Gallagher) [from Deuce] – 10:03
3. "Bullfrog Blues" (Traditional [actually William "Big Foot" Harris AKA Bud Johnson]; arranged by Gallagher) – 6:47

CD bonus tracks

1. "What in the World" (Traditional; arranged by Gallagher) – 7:40
2. "Hoodoo Man" (Traditional; arranged by Gallagher) – 6:02

== Performance recording dates and venues ==
- 5 February 1972: College, Luton, England
- 12 February 1972: Teatro Lirico, Milan, Italy
- 14 February 1972: Space Electronic Club, Florence, Italy
- 5 March 1972: Scala Cinema, Ludwigsburg, Germany

== Personnel ==
Musicians

- Rory Gallagher – guitars, harmonica, mandolin, vocals
- Gerry McAvoy – bass guitar
- Wilgar Campbell – drums

Technical

- Mick Rock – liner notes, photography
- Alan Perkins – recording engineer
- Tony Arnold – remastering
- Donal Gallagher – executive producer
