= Mark Feltham (musician) =

English musician

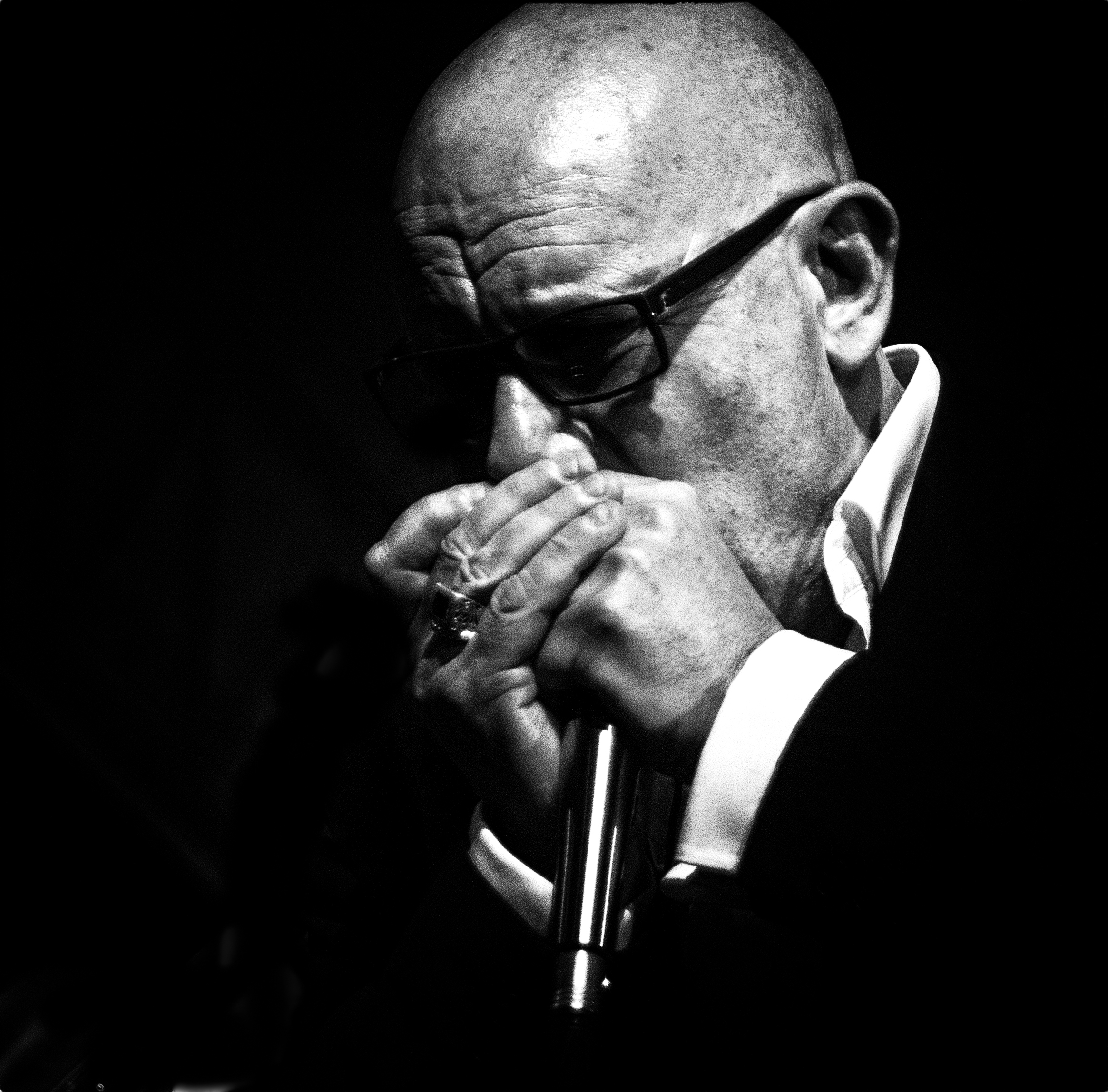
- Feltham performing live in 2013

Background information
- Born: 20 October 1955 (age 70); Bermondsey, Southwark, London, England
- Genres: Blues rock; R&B
- Occupation: Musician
- Instruments: Harmonica; vocals
- Years active: 1980–present

Mark Feltham (born 20 October 1955) is an English musician, best known for playing harmonica with several artists including Oasis and Talk Talk. Feltham is a long-term member of the British blues rock band Nine Below Zero, and Rory Gallagher's band; and is often used as a session musician.

In an interview on the South Bank Show broadcast in 1981, Nine Below Zero guitarist and singer Dennis Greaves noted that Feltham's 'nan' had played the harmonica and his dad bought him his first instrument. Greaves also stated that Feltham had been playing in his bedroom for 11 years, but had given the instrument up for a time before joining Nine Below Zero, his first band. In addition, when he joined he did not know how to play through a microphone or what an amplifier was. Greaves also noted that Feltham studied the music of Little Walter, Charlie McCoy and Junior Wells.

== Selected discography ==
=== Albums ===
- Nine Below Zero: Live at the Marquee (1980); Don't Point Your Finger (1981); Third Degree (1983); On The Road Again (1991); Chilled (2002); Hats Off (2004); It's Never Too Late (2009); 13 Shades Of Blue (2016); Avalanche (2019)
- The Alarm: Marchin' On (1982)
- Box of Frogs: Box of Frogs (1984)
- Anthony Moore: The Only Choice (1984)
- Mick Clarke: Rock Me (1985)
- Anri: Trouble in Paradise (1986)
- Rory Gallagher: Defender (1987); Fresh Evidence (1990); Etched in Blue (1992); Live in Cork (1994); Meeting with the G-Man (2003); Blue Day for the Blues (1995); Wheels Within Wheels (2003); Big Guns (2005)
- Roger Daltrey: Under a Raging Moon (1985): Move Better in the Night / It Don't Satisfy Me
- Dave Kelly: Lonesome Man Blues (1986)
- Paul Young: The Secret of Association (1985): I Was in Chains
- Joolz: Hex (1987)
- Manfred Mann's Earth Band: Masque (1987)
- New Model Army: The Ghost of Cain (1986): Poison Street / Ballad; Eight (2000); Someone Like Jesus / Mixam
- Talk Talk: The Colour of Spring (1986): Living in Another World; Spirit of Eden (1988); Laughing Stock (1991); London '86; Missing Pieces (2001)
- Scarlet Fantastic: 24hrs (1988): Lucky Seven / Stay
- Roachford: Roachford (1988): Lying Again / Nobody But You
- Godley & Creme: Goodbye Blue Sky (1988)
- The The: Mind Bomb (1989): Kingdom of Rain / Good Morning Beautiful / The Beat(en) Generation / The Violence of Truth
- Deacon Blue: When the World Knows Your Name (1989): Love & Regret / Your Constant Heart
- The Truth: Jump (1989)
- Nazareth: Snakes 'n' Ladders (1989)
- Roger Chapman: Walking The Cat (1989)
- The Adventures: Trading Secrets With the Moon (1990): Don't Blame It on the Moon
- Andrew Ridgeley: Son of Albert (1990): Big Machine / Baby Jane / The Price of Love
- Frazier Chorus: Ray (1990)
- Roy Harper: Once (1990): Nowhere To Run To / Once
- Sunsonic: Melting Down on Motor Angel (1990): Drive Away
- The Almighty: Soul Destruction (1991): Hell To Pay
- Alison Limerick: And I Still Rise (1992): Trouble
- Innocence: Build (1992): Looking For Someone
- The Lightning Seeds: Sense (1992): Sense
- Skeleton Crew: Blue Mania (1992): Mother Earth / Watch Your Step / Blues Got Me / Trail of Tears / Mississippi Burning
- Dave Allison / Phil Brown / Mark Hollis: AV Installation (1993)
- Indecent Obsession: Relativity (1993)
- Little Angels: Jam (1993)
- Mitch Malloy: Ceilings & Walls (1993)
- Billy Rain: Salad Days (1994)
- Javier Paxarino / Glen Velez: Temura (1994)
- .O.Rang: Herd of Instinct (1994)
- Sasha: Magic (1994): Higher Ground
- Annie Lennox: Medusa (1995)
- Atlantique: Atlantique (1995)
- Londonbeat: Londonbeat (1995)
- Catherine Wheel: Happy Days (1995)
- Peter Smith: Together (1995)
- Steve Jansen / Richard Barbieri: Stone To Flesh (1995) Mother London / Everything Ends in Darkness
- The Almighty: Just Add Life (1996)
- Box of Frogs: Strange Land (1996) Back Where I Started
- Catherine Wheel: Like Cats & Dogs (1996): Wish You Were Here
- Inaura: One Million Smiles (1996): Desire
- Talbot & White: Off The Beaten Track (1996): Til The Cows Come Home
- Terrorvision: Regular Urban Survivors (1996)
- Joe Cocker: Across from Midnight (1997)
- Oasis: Be Here Now (1997): All Around The World
- Paul Carrack: Winter Wonderland (1997): Beautiful World
- PJ Proby: Legend (1997): When
- Robbie Williams: Life Thru a Lens (1997): South of the Border / Let Me Entertain You
- The Everly Brothers: Whistle Down The Wind (1998): Cold
- Mark Hollis: Mark Hollis (1998)
- Roger Chapman: Turn Unstoned (1998)
- Zucchero: Bluesugar (1998)
- Dido: No Angel (1999): I'm No Angel
- Faultline: Closer Colder (1999): Partyline Honey
- Kevin Rowland: My Beauty (1999): Rag Doll / Daydream Believer / This Guys in Love With You / I can't Tell The Bottom From The Top / Reflections of My Life
- The Robbie McIntosh Band: Emotional Bends (1999)
- Spooky Tooth, Cross Purpose (1999)
- Oasis: Standing on the Shoulder of Giants (2000): Gas Panic
- Michael Ball: This Time It's Personal (2000)
- Micky Moody: I Eat Them For Breakfast (2000)
- Robbie McIntosh: Widescreen (2000)
- Robbie Williams: Sing When You're Winning (2000): Forever Texas
- Texas: Greatest Hits (2000): I Don't Want A Lover / Everyday Now
- Chris Shields: Sky Turn Blue (2001): Haunt Me / The Fool
- Five: Kingsize (2001); C'mon C'mon
- Luther Grosvenor: Floodgates Anthology (2001)
- Ocean Colour Scene: Mechanical Wonder (2001)
- Roger Chapman: Rollin' & Tumblin' (2001)
- Archive: You All Look the Same to Me (2002): Again
- Beth Gibbons & Rustin Man : Out of Season (2002)
- Justin Sullivan: Navigating by the Stars (2003)
- Karl Jenkins: Adiemus V: Vocalise (2003): Mi Contra Fa / Diablous in Musica
- Mark Owen: In Your Own Time (2003)
- Skin: Fleshwounds (2003)
- Will Young: Friday's Child (2003)
- Cactus World News: No Shelter (2004)
- Zucchero: Zuccero & Co (2004)
- David Charvet: Se Laisser Quelque Chose (2005)
- Will Young: Keep On (2005): Switch It On
- Switchfoot: Oh Gravity (2006)
- Gary Moore: Close As You Get (2007); Checkin' Up on My Baby / Hard Times
- Nasio Fontaine: Rise Up (2007): Universal City
- Gary Fletcher: Human Spirit (2007)
- Gabriella Cilmi: Lessons To Be Learned (2008) Sweet About Me
- Blue Ox Babes: Apples & Oranges (2009)
- Johnny Cash: Remixed (2009)
- Lucas Renney: Strange Glory (2009)
- Gary Barlow: Since I Saw You Last (2013)
- Steven Wilson: To the Bone (2017): To The Bone / "Refuge"

=== Singles ===
- Nine Below Zero: "Homework" (1980)
- Talk Talk: "Living in Another World" (1986)
- New Model Army: "Poison Street" (1987)
- The Christians: "Harvest for the World" (1988)
- The The: "The Beat(en) Generation" (1989)
- Deacon Blue: "Love and Regret" (1989); "Wages Day" (1989)
- The KLF: "Justified & Ancient" (1991)
- The KLF: "Last Train to Transcentral" (1991)
- Tom Jones & New Model Army: "Gimme Shelter" (1993)
- Oasis: "Whatever" (1994); "All Around The World" (1998); Round Are Way (1995)
- Mike Flowers Pops: "Wonderwall" (1995)
- Will Young: "Switch It On" (2005)
- Gabriella Cilmi: "Sweet About Me" (2008)

=== DVD ===
- New Model Army: Live 161203 (2003)
- Nine Below Zero: Bring It On Home
- Nine Below Zero: On The Road Again
- Nine Below Zero: Sights and Sounds Vol 1
- Rory Gallagher: Live at Cork Opera House (2006)

=== Film soundtracks ===
- Tootsie (1982)
- Judge Dredd (1995)
- Lock, Stock and Two Smoking Barrels (1998)
- The Mighty (1998)
- Notting Hill (1999)
- Lucky Break (2001)
- Once Upon a Time in the Midlands (2002)
- Sweet Home Alabama (2003)
