= Wilgar Campbell =

- Born: Wilgar Campbell; 1946
- Origin: Ireland
- Died: October 1989 (aged 42–43)
- Genres: Hard rock; blues rock
- Occupation: Musician
- Instrument: Drums
- Years active: 1968–1989
- Formerly of: Andwella's Dream, Rory Gallagher, Mick Abrahams, Billy Boy Arnold, The Groundhogs

Wilgar William Campbell (1946 – October 1989) was an Irish blues rock musician, best known for his role as drummer with Rory Gallagher in the early 1970s.

== Career ==
=== Early career ===
Campbell played with Belfast band The Method, who moved to London in 1968 and became Andwella's Dream. He played on only one track, "Felix", on their debut album Love and Poetry, which band leader Dave Lewis called "the best drumming on the album", before returning home to be with his wife and children. In Belfast he joined Deep Joy, also including bass guitarist Gerry McAvoy, who supported Rory Gallagher's band Taste on tour in 1970. Both Campbell and McAvoy were recruited by Gallagher in 1971 for his new solo project after the break-up of Taste. Campbell was married at this time and living with his family in Streatham, London.

=== Rory Gallagher ===
While with Gallagher, Campbell performed on the albums Rory Gallagher, Deuce and Live in Europe. With the increased touring that followed the success of the albums, Campbell developed a fear of flying and missed two concerts during a short tour of Ireland, being replaced by Rod de'Ath from the band Killing Floor. A month later, Campbell refused to leave his house to fly to a concert in Lausanne, Switzerland, and was again replaced by de'Ath. Three weeks later in June 1972, Campbell left Gallagher's band by mutual consent and was permanently replaced by de'Ath. After a few shows, Gallagher expanded his lineup by adding Killing Floor's keyboard player Lou Martin, who stayed for five years. According to McAvoy, Martin was recruited to help fill out the band's sound as de'Ath was not as technically proficient as Campbell.

=== Later career ===
After he left Gallagher, Campbell played with the Mick Abrahams Band before joining Tony McPhee's band Terraplane, and then formed The Wildcats, which later featured Gary Fletcher. He also played with Billy Boy Arnold, and in 1976 he joined the 1950s-style rock and roll band Yakety Yak, with whom he stayed until 1980, recording one single with them in that time. In 1981 several members of Yakety Yak, including Campbell, formed another 1950s-style band called the Dragons, who subsequently changed their name to Sonny King & the Sons of Swing in 1982. Campbell continued to play with them till 1987, though occasionally they used Geoff Britton when Campbell was unable to participate. During 1982–84, Campbell also played with another of McPhee's bands, The Groundhogs.

Campbell also played in the Nickey Barclay band in London in the 1980s, which included Barclay (ex-Fanny) and Lou Martin on keyboards, Pete Bingham on bass, and Dave Ball on lead guitar (ex-Procol Harum). The band played across London on the blues rock circuit during the 1980s at venues including The White Lion, Putney; The Star and Garter on Lower Richmond Road; The Golden Lion, Fulham and the Cartoon, Croydon.

Campbell worked with the South London-based band Sailin' Shoes with guitarist and singer Steve Boyce, bassist Bill Adey and keyboard player John Cooke.

== Death ==
Campbell died in October 1989 after suffering from alcohol-related illnesses. According to McAvoy, Campbell had never been a heavy drinker until the break-up of his marriage, which coincided with the onset of his fear of flying. Previously a very fit person and enthusiastic cricketer and footballer, his health started to deteriorate as his drinking habits changed "from virtually nothing to hard spirits, and lots of it, in a very short space of time".
