= Joe O'Donnell (musician) =

- Born: 4 September 1947 (age 78); Limerick County Limerick, Ireland
- Genres: Celtic, Celtic rock, Irish folk, Jazz fusion, Progressive rock
- Occupations: Musician, songwriter, bandleader, producer
- Instruments: Vocals, violin, mandolin
- Years active: 1967–present
- Labels: Polydor, Chrysalis, RCA, Harvest, Decca, Sony BMG, Silvery Records
- Website: joeodonnellsshkayla.com

Joe O'Donnell (born 4 September 1948, Limerick) is an Irish musician best known for his fiery and innovative playing in East of Eden, Headstone, Mushroom, The Woods Band, Decca's Granny's Intentions, and his acclaimed 1977 violin-led concept album, Gaodhal's Vision with Rory Gallagher.

His work also included John Dentith [aka Theodor Thunder] of the Alan Price Band, David Lennox (The Equals, Ginger Baker, Blodwyn Pig) and Steve Bolton.

O'Donnell currently plays out his powerful five-piece Celtic/rock band 'Joe O'Donnell's Shkayla'. The band's most recent studio album, 'Celtic Cargo' has collected rave reviews from top magazines like fRoots, FiddleOn and Rock'n'Reel. Shkayla line up is:

- Joe O'Donnell electric violin, mandolin, vocals
- Si Hayden – guitar, vocals
- Martin Barter – keyboards, vocals
- Adrian Litvinoff – bass
- Karen Milne - drums

== Discography ==
1973 Mushroom – Early One Morning, + 2singles
1974 Riff Raff – Original Man
1974 Headstone – Bad Habits
1975 Headstone + 2singles
1975 Gay & Terry Woods – Backwoods
1975 East of Eden – Another Eden /EMI + 2singles
1975 Henry McCullough – Mind Your Own Business + 1single
1976 Jade Warrior – Kites
1977 Joe O'Donnell Band – Gaodhal's Vision /Polydor Records + 1single
1983 Joe O'Donnell - Milesian /Entente (2) Germany
1983 Electric Ceilidh Band – Ceann Traigh Ghruineard /with nine-part TV series & TV appearances
1998 Joe O'Donnell's Shkayla – Shkayla /Folksound
2004 Joe O'Donnell – Gaodhol's Vision, re-released with bonus tracks /Sony BMG/RCA
2008 Joe O'Donnell's Shkayla – Celtic Cargo /SidNorris + 1single
2010 Joe O'Donnell – Noel Nouvelet /SidNorris
2011 Rory Gallagher - Notes From San Francisco (recorded 1977) /Eagle
2013 Joe O'Donnell's Shkayla – Into The Becoming /Silvery
2013 Joe O'Donnell – Gaodhol's Vision, re-mastered re-release /Silvery Records
2015 Joe O'Donnell – O'Neil's Lament /Silvery Records
