= Deuce (Rory Gallagher album) =

Studio album by Rory Gallagher
- Released: November 1971
- Recorded: 1971
- Studio: Tangerine Studios, Dalston, London
- Genre: Blues rock
- Length: 46:30 (original release); 51:12 (1998 remaster)
- Label: Polydor (original UK release); Atco (original US release)
- Producer: Rory Gallagher

Rory Gallagher chronology
Rory Gallagher (1971)	Deuce (1971)	Live In Europe (1972)

Professional ratings
Review scores
Source	Rating
AllMusic	4/5 stars
Pop Matters	7/10 stars
Rolling Stone	(not rated)

Deuce is the second solo album by Rory Gallagher, released in 1971. In contrast with his previous album, Rory Gallagher, where Gallagher tried for a precise, organized sound, Deuce was his first of many attempts to capture the energy of a live performance in the studio.

== Recording ==
Deuce was recorded at Tangerine Studios in Dalston with Gerry McAvoy on bass guitar and Wilgar Campbell on drums and percussion. The engineer was Robin Sylvester and it was produced by Rory Gallagher. In order to capture the feeling of a live performance that Gallagher wanted, he would often record immediately before or after live performances while keeping production at a minimum. It was released on POLYDOR SUPER 2383 076 in November 1971. Deuce was remastered from the original master tapes in 1997 by Colin Fairly at Tony Arnold's Courthouse Facilities in Dorset. The remastered album was released in 1998 with the bonus track "Persuasion".

== Impact ==
At the time of release, Deuce was not a huge success. Rolling Stone damned it with faint praise such as: "All of which is not to say that it isn't a good album. If it isn't a world beater, it isn't all that bad either" and described the supporting musicians as "the highly pedestrian, almost pedantic bass and drum thumpings of two hacks named McAvoy and Campbell". However, over the years the album has remained popular with Gallagher's fans which include many legendary guitarists. For example, Johnny Marr of The Smiths said in an interview: "There was one day when I was playing along with the Deuce album which was a complete turning point for me as a guitar player". Critic Dave Thompson says the album "peaks with the closing, broiling 'Crest of a Wave'. With bass set on stun, the drums a turbulent wall of sound, and Gallagher's guitar a sonic switchblade, it's a masterpiece of aggressive dynamics, the sound of a band so close to its peak that you can almost touch the electricity." In an interview shortly after the release of the album Gallagher said "I was looking for a raw earthy sound on Deuce and I was fairly pleased with it. Deuce made the top twenty for one week, I guess I was a little disappointed but not depressed; after all 17,000 albums is not bad."

== Track listing ==
All tracks composed by Rory Gallagher.

Side one

1. "Used to Be" – 5:06
2. "I'm Not Awake Yet" – 5:24
3. "Don't Know Where I'm Going" – 2:45
4. "Maybe I Will" – 4:13
5. "Whole Lot of People" – 4:54

Side two

1. "In Your Town" – 5:43
2. "Should've Learnt My Lesson" – 3:34
3. "There's a Light" – 5:59
4. "Out of My Mind" – 3:00
5. "Crest of a Wave" – 5:52

=== 1998 CD edition ===
- All songs composed by Rory Gallagher
1. "I'm Not Awake Yet" – 5:24
2. "Used to Be" – 5:06
3. "Don't Know Where I'm Going" – 2:45
4. "Maybe I Will" – 4:13
5. "Whole Lot of People" – 4:54
6. "In Your Town" – 5:43
7. "Should've Learnt My Lesson" – 3:34
8. "There's a Light" – 5:59
9. "Out of My Mind" – 3:00
10. "Crest of a Wave" – 5:52

CD bonus track

1. "Persuasion" – 4:42

For 2012 CD edition, track list was reverted to 1971 configuration.

== Personnel ==
- Rory Gallagher – vocals, guitars, harmonica
- Gerry McAvoy – bass guitar
- Wilgar Campbell – drums, percussion

Technical

- Robin Sylvester – engineer
- Mick Rock – sleeve, photography

== Charts ==
1971 chart performance for Deuce
Chart (1971)	Peak position
UK Albums (OCC)	39

2022 chart performance for Deuce
Chart (2022)	Peak position
Belgian Albums (Ultratop Flanders)	120
Belgian Albums (Ultratop Wallonia)	154
German Albums (Offizielle Top 100)	34
Scottish Albums (OCC)	15
Swiss Albums (Schweizer Hitparade)	52
