= Wheels Within Wheels =

Studio album by Rory Gallagher
- Released: 10 March 2003
- Genre: Blues; folk
- Length: 52:02
- Label: Capo
- Producer: Rory Gallagher, Dónal Gallagher, Tony Arnold

Rory Gallagher chronology
BBC Sessions (1999)	Wheels Within Wheels (2003)	Meeting with the G-Man (2003)

Professional ratings
Review scores
Source	Rating
Allmusic	4/5 stars

Wheels Within Wheels is a blues and folk-influenced acoustic rock album by Rory Gallagher. Featuring a range of acoustic styles including flamenco, skiffle and traditional Irish music, the album was compiled from lost recordings and outtakes by Gallagher's brother Dónal and released posthumously. A number of notable musicians appeared on the album, and the songs were recorded in various locations all over the world between 1974 and 1994.

The album cover was designed by David Oxtoby.

== Track listing ==
All tracks written by Rory Gallagher except where stated.

1. "Wheels Within Wheels" – 3:32
2. "Flight to Paradise" (Juan Martín) – 4:30
3. "As the Crow Flies" (Tony Joe White)– 4:12
4. "Lonesome Highway" – 5:20
5. "Bratacha Dubha" (Traditional; arranged by Rory Gallagher) – 2:59
6. "She Moved Thro' the Fair / Ann Cran Ull" (Traditional) – 2:22
7. "Barley and Grape Rag" – 4:25
8. "The Cuckoo" – 3:45
9. "Amazing Grace" (Traditional; arranged by Rory Gallagher) – 1:20
10. "Walkin' Blues" (Son House) – 5:34
11. "Blue Moon of Kentucky (Bill Monroe) – 2:54
12. "Deep Elem Blues" (Traditional) – 4:17
13. "Goin' to My Home Town" – 4:58
14. "Lonesome Highway Refraining" – 2:00

== Personnel ==
- Rory Gallagher – vocals, guitars, harmonica, mandolin
- Juan Martín – guitar on track 2
- Martin Carthy – guitar on track 5
- Chris Newman – guitar on track 5
- Bert Jansch – guitar on track 6
- Roland Van Campenhout – guitar on track 8 & 12
- Lonnie Donegan – guitar, vocals on track 13
- Gerry McAvoy – bass guitar
- Michael Ridout – bass guitar
- Lou Martin – keyboards, piano
- Rod de'Ath – drums
- Paul Bevis – drums
- Ted McKenna – drums
- Mark Feltham – harmonica on tracks 10–11
- Máire Ní Chathasaigh – harp on track 5
- Béla Fleck – banjo on tracks 9–11
- The Dubliners on track 7
