= Jinx (Rory Gallagher album) =

Studio album by Rory Gallagher
- Released: April 1982
- Recorded: May–June 1981
- Studio: Dierks Studios, Cologne, Germany
- Genre: Blues rock
- Length: LP: 37:56; Original CD: 43:17; Remastered: 47:21
- Label: Chrysalis (UK); Mercury (USA)
- Producer: Rory Gallagher

Rory Gallagher chronology
Stage Struck (1980)	Jinx (1982)	Defender (1987)

Professional ratings
Review scores
Source	Rating
Allmusic	4/5 stars

Jinx is the twelfth album and the ninth studio album by the Irish musician Rory Gallagher. It was his final album for Chrysalis Records; the remainder of his work would be issued on independent labels. It was his last studio album for five years.

In 2000 it was remastered with different track order and bonus tracks. The length of some songs is also different from the LP.

== Track listing ==
All tracks composed by Rory Gallagher except where indicated.

=== LP ===
Side one

1. "Signals" – 4:31
2. "The Devil Made Me Do It" – 2:54
3. "Double Vision" – 4:48
4. "Easy Come, Easy Go" – 5:07
5. "Big Guns" – 3:25

Side two

1. "Jinxed" – 5:10
2. "Bourbon" – 3:54
3. "Ride On Red, Ride On" – 4:17 (Henry Glover, Morris Levy, Teddy Reig)
4. "Loose Talk" – 3:50

=== Original CD ===
1. "Big Guns" – 3:28
2. "Bourbon" – 3:54
3. "Double Vision" – 4:51
4. "The Devil Made Me Do It" – 2:54
5. "Hell Cat" (bonus track) – 5:04
6. "Signals" – 4:37
7. "Jinxed" – 5:11
8. "Easy Come, Easy Go" – 5:07
9. "Ride On Red, Ride On" – 4:19 (Henry Glover, Morris Levy, Teddy Reig)
10. "Loose Talk" – 3:52

=== 2000 remastered CD ===
1. "Big Guns" – 3:30
2. "Bourbon" – 4:03
3. "Double Vision" – 5:04
4. "The Devil Made Me Do It" – 2:52
5. "Signals" – 4:42
6. "Jinxed" – 5:00
7. "Easy Come, Easy Go" – 5:45
8. "Nothin' But The Devil" (bonus track) – 3:08 (Gerry West)
9. "Ride On Red, Ride On" – 4:32 (Henry Glover, Morris Levy, Teddy Reig)
10. "Lonely Mile" (bonus track) – 4:37
11. "Loose Talk" – 4:08

=== 2017 remastered CD ===
1. "Signals" – 4:36
2. "The Devil Made Me Do It" – 2:54
3. "Double Vision" – 4:51
4. "Easy Come, Easy Go" – 5:07
5. "Big Guns" – 3:29
6. "Jinxed" – 5:11
7. "Bourbon" – 3:54
8. "Ride On Red, Ride On" – 4:19 (Henry Glover, Morris Levy, Teddy Reig)
9. "Loose Talk" – 3:53
10. "Nothin' But The Devil" (bonus track) – 3:09 (Gerry West)
11. "Lonely Mile" (bonus track) – 4:47

== Personnel ==
- Rory Gallagher – vocals, guitar, harmonica
- Gerry McAvoy – bass guitar
- Brendan O'Neill – drums, percussion

with:

- Bob Andrews – keyboards
- Ray Beavis and Dick Parry – saxophone
