= Fresh Evidence =

Studio album by Rory Gallagher
- Released: 4 June 1990
- Recorded: Maison Rouge, Redan Recorders, Music Station and Audio One
- Genre: Blues rock
- Length: 47:06 (LP): 55:01 (CD)
- Label: Capo (UK); Capo/I.R.S. (US)
- Producer: Rory Gallagher

Rory Gallagher chronology
Defender (1987)	Fresh Evidence (1990)	BBC Sessions (1999)

Professional ratings
Review scores
Source	Rating
Allmusic	3.5/5 stars
Blogcritics	(not rated)
Select	2/5 stars

Fresh Evidence is Rory Gallagher's eleventh and last studio album, his fourteenth album overall. The album was unusual in that Gallagher used more additional musicians and spent more time recording than he normally did. Not as unusual, the songs show his love for blues artists such as Robert Johnson and Son House and for other genres such as Zydeco as well. The album is influenced by his deteriorating health, and explores themes of ill health, mortality, and fighting back against overwhelming odds.

== Background ==
After the release of the album, Gallagher gave several interviews where he went into some detail about the songs and his way of making music. He emphasized how he modeled his music after folk and blues legends such as Muddy Waters. "So this folk music tradition of passing on, picking up, and stealing goes on like mad! If I'm doing a blues number I can do it very traditional if I want to; I can also add my own twists to it."

Gallagher said that the song "Heaven's Gate" is about a man "haunted in a room in a terrible condition. It's a semi-redemption type of song and it's also slightly preaching to people that you can't bribe St. Peter." His inspiration for the song is the blues song "Hellhound On My Trail" by Robert Johnson.

"The Loop" is a jazz instrumental. The song title refers to the Chicago loop the center of downtown Chicago that is demarcated by the CTA elevated train tracks that make a loop around it. The sound of a train pulling up to a stop is heard at the beginning of the song.

"Walking Wounded" is a song about a man who is down but still fighting. Gallagher said it was partly inspired by his health problems.

"Kid Gloves" is about a prize fighter pressured by the mob to throw a fight who refuses to give in. It is one of many Gallagher songs inspired by hardboiled fiction and film noir.

The music for "Middle Name" is inspired by blues legend Slim Harpo. For the story Gallagher "tried to create an image of being down around the bible belt with a guy stuck in a situation searching for someone that could be his wife or someone else before a big storm or Armageddon or the Holocaust."

"King of Zydeco" is inspired by the music of Clifton Chenier whom Gallagher called the "B.B. King of Zydeco". Chenier died before Gallagher was able to meet him, even though they played at least one music festival together and the regret over that lost opportunity inspired the song.

== Recording ==
Gallagher's studio albums were often recorded rapidly, in as little as two weeks. This was partly due to time limitations caused by his heavy touring schedule but also due to the fact that Gallagher was always more comfortable in front of a live audience than in the studio. However, Gallagher spent six months recording Fresh Evidence. He described the recording of the album as follows:

"It took enough out of us, I can tell you. It took about six months to make, which is quite a long time really. It sounds like relatively simple music, but we were trying to get a good vintage, ethnic sound in the production and everything else. We used a lot of old valve microphones, tape echo, old spring reverbs and things like that, instead of using all the digital equipment."

== Track listing ==
All tracks composed by Rory Gallagher except where indicated.

Side one

1. "Kid Gloves" – 5:39
2. "The King of Zydeco (To Clifton Chenier)" – 3:42
3. "Middle Name" – 4:13
4. "Alexis" (instrumental) – 4:06
5. "Empire State Express" – 5:11 (Eddie "Son" House)

Side two

1. "Ghost Blues" – 7:59
2. "Heaven's Gate" – 5:08
3. "The Loop" (instrumental) – 2:21
4. "Walkin' Wounded" – 5:08
5. "Slumming Angel" – 3:39

CD bonus track

1. "Never Asked You for Nothin'" – 4:29
2. "Bowed Not Broken" – 3:26

== Personnel ==
- Rory Gallagher – vocals, electric and acoustic guitars, dulcimer, mandolin and electric sitar
- Gerry McAvoy – bass guitar
- Brendan O'Neill – drums
- John Cooke – keyboards

Invited guests

- Lou Martin – piano
- Mark Feltham – harmonica
- Geraint Watkins – accordion
- John Earle – tenor saxophone, baritone saxophone
- Ray Beavis – tenor saxophone
- Dick Hanson – trumpet

Technical

- Colin Fairley, Daniel McGowan, John McGowan, Will Reid-Dick – recording
