= Photo-Finish =

Studio album by Rory Gallagher
- Released: 13 October 1978
- Recorded: July–August 1978
- Studio: Dierks Studios, Cologne, Germany
- Genre: Hard rock; blues rock
- Length: 44:14 (original release); 50:32 (1998 remaster)
- Label: Chrysalis
- Producer: Rory Gallagher, Alan O'Duffy

Rory Gallagher chronology
Calling Card (1976)	Photo-Finish (1978)	Top Priority (1979)

Professional ratings
Review scores
Source	Rating
AllMusic	3/5 stars
Uncut	7/10

Photo-Finish is the seventh studio album and ninth album overall by Irish musician Rory Gallagher, released in 1978. It marked a turning point in Gallagher's career. Most of the songs on Photo-Finish were initially recorded on what was to be an earlier album, but Gallagher was unhappy with the recordings. He fired the drummer and keyboardist from his current band and replaced only the drummer, changing the band to a power trio as his original bands had been.

== Background ==
The album name reflects the fact that the finished product was delivered to the record company just at the deadline. The album came after a two-year period without an album release, due to Gallagher's decision to scrap the earlier version of the album and the need to recover from an accident to his thumb. Gallagher originally recorded many of the songs that would end up on Photo-Finish in San Francisco. Rather than producing the album himself as he usually did he worked with Elliot Mazer, a successful producer who had previously produced hits for Neil Young. At the last minute — the initial copies of the album had been pressed— Gallagher decided to simply scrap the Mazer-produced album. In an interview Gallagher stated:

"it wasn't because of the material or the musicians or anything like that. It was a song thing that I didn't think on the technical side everything worked. So I scrapped the thing"

Immediately after scrapping the album Gallagher injured his thumb — catching it in the door of a cab. He left San Francisco and went to a studio in Germany to rework the album. He also reworked his band changing drummers and dropping the keyboardist to return to the power trio format of Taste and his original solo band. Photo-Finish is the result of those German studio sessions. The original versions of the songs as recorded with the group including a keyboardist were posthumously released as disc one of the album Notes from San Francisco.

One song from the album that Gallagher would often perform live was "The Last of the Independents". Like other Gallagher songs (e.g. "Philby" and "Continental Op") the song was inspired by Gallagher's love of hardboiled fiction and film noir. When an interviewer asked him "What about “The Last of the Independents” in some ways it talks about yourself. Did you have that in mind when you wrote that song?" Gallagher replied:

"No, but some people have said that to me. They thought that I was the last of a particular group of people, or I was independent or something. Maybe I am a bit, but I doubt that. The song actually came about when I had the title and then wrote the song. Half way through it I realized that I had read the review of the picture Charley Varrick with Walter Matthau. Did you see that? The old-time crook who turned over the bank. And basically that's the story. The Charley Varrick movie was subtitled “The Last of the Independents.” I loved the story, but I never saw the movie. Not having seen the picture, I can only guess what it was about. But the story is a bit like another picture Joseph Losey made with Stanley Baker, The Criminal. It's about a guy who is the only one who knows where the money is stashed X years ago, who does his time in jail and gets out, and they are all ghosting after him trying to find it. The song is about what the guy is doing. They are after him on a jumbo jet. He gets out on a laundry chute in Chicago. It is just a comic gangster-type song that has a good Bo Diddley sound to it.”

== Recording ==
In contrast to the experience working with Mazer in San Francisco, Gallagher enjoyed working at the German studio: "the studio was perfect. It was 13 kilometers from Cologne. So you were close to a big city if you wanted to be near one. The studio was also 24-track. We brought over an Irish engineer who was working in London who had previously done Venus and Mars (Paul McCartney) and Let It Bleed (Rolling Stones), and a lot of Kinks records."

== Track listing ==
All tracks composed by Rory Gallagher.

Side one

1. "Shin Kicker" – 4:01
2. "Brute Force & Ignorance" – 4:15
3. "Cruise On Out" – 4:41
4. "Cloak & Dagger" – 5:19
5. "Overnight Bag" – 4:50

Side two

1. "Shadow Play" – 4:43
2. "The Mississippi Sheiks" – 5:59
3. "The Last of the Independents" – 3:57
4. "Fuel to the Fire" – 6:20

CD bonus track

1. "Early Warning" (bonus track) – 2:49
2. "Juke Box Annie" (bonus track) – 3:17

== Personnel ==
- Rory Gallagher – guitar, vocals, mandolin, harmonica
- Gerry McAvoy – bass guitar
- Ted McKenna – drums

Technical

- Dónal Gallagher – album coordination
- Gary Heery – cover photography
- Danny Clifford – inner sleeve photography, tour programme
