= Defender (album) =

Studio album by Rory Gallagher
- Released: July 1987
- Recorded: 1987
- Studio: The Point, London; Olympic Studios, London; West 3 Studios, London; Music Works, London; Redan Studios
- Genre: Blues rock
- Length: 55:25
- Label: Capo/Demon
- Producer: Rory Gallagher

Rory Gallagher chronology
Jinx (1982)	Defender (1987)	Fresh Evidence (1990)

Professional ratings
Review scores
Source	Rating
AllMusic	3/5 stars

Defender is the thirteenth album and tenth studio album by Irish musician Rory Gallagher. Coming after a five-year hiatus from the recording studio, it was his first album released on the Capo label.

The song "Continental Op" was inspired by the nameless fictional detective created by Dashiell Hammett, and was dedicated to Hammett.

== Track listing ==
All tracks composed by Rory Gallagher except where indicated.

Side one

1. "Kickback City" - 4:49
2. "Loanshark Blues" - 4:27
3. "Continental Op" - 4:33
4. "I Ain't No Saint" - 4:58
5. "Failsafe Day" - 4:23

Side two

1. "Road to Hell" - 5:32
2. "Doing Time" - 4:06
3. "Smear Campaign" - 4:47
4. "Don't Start Me Talkin'" (Sonny Boy Williamson II) - 3:35
5. "Seven Days" - 5:14

CD bonus tracks, also included as a bonus 7inch single on some issues of the LP

1. "Seems to Me" - 4:52 (Bonus)
2. "No Peace for the Wicked" - 4:09 (Bonus)

== Personnel ==
- Rory Gallagher – vocals, guitar, harmonica
- Gerry McAvoy – bass guitar
- Brendan O'Neill – drums

Invited guests

- John Cooke – keyboards
- Lou Martin – piano on "Seven Days"
- Bob Andrews – piano on "Don't Start Me to Talkin'"
- Mark Feltham – harmonica on "Don't Start Me to Talkin'"

Technical

- Alan O'Duffy – production associate
- Dónal Gallagher – executive producer
