= Top Priority =

Studio album by Rory Gallagher
- Released: September 1979
- Recorded: March–April 1979
- Studios: Dierks Studios, Cologne, Germany
- Genres: Hard rock; blues rock
- Length: 36:09
- Label: Chrysalis
- Producers: Rory Gallagher, Alan O'Duffy

Rory Gallagher chronology
Photo-Finish (1978)	Top Priority (1979)	Stage Struck (1980)

Professional ratings
Review scores
Source	Rating
Allmusic	3.5/5 stars

Top Priority is Rory Gallagher's eighth studio album and tenth album overall. It was his fourth and final studio album for Chrysalis Records both in the UK and USA. The album was the second with his revised power trio band. Like the previous album Photo-Finish, Top Priority is a return to hard rock. The ballads, acoustic and folk influences that were seen on albums such as Calling Card are replaced by more conventional but powerful blues rock.

The album title reflects the pressure that Gallagher often felt regarding the business end of making music. After the release of Photo-Finish Gallagher's band had a successful tour of the United States that resulted in good press both in the states and at home. Chrysalis was eager to keep the momentum going and encouraged Rory to release another studio album quickly, telling him they would make it their "Top Priority" and actively promote it. To remind the executives of their promise Gallagher used the phrase for the album title.

The song "Philby" was based on Kim Philby who was a famous Cold War British double agent for the Soviets. The song is an example of Gallagher's fascination with men on the outside of society. For the guitar solo Gallagher utilized a Coral electric sitar that he borrowed from The Who's Pete Townshend to give a feeling of the Eastern Bloc.

== Track listing ==
All tracks composed by Rory Gallagher.

Side one

1. "Follow Me" – 4:40
2. "Philby" – 3:51
3. "Wayward Child" – 3:31
4. "Key Chain" – 4:09
5. "At the Depot" – 2:56

Side two

1. "Bad Penny" – 4.29
2. "Just Hit Town" – 3:37
3. "Off the Handle" – 5:36
4. "Public Enemy No. 1" – 3:46

re-released CD bonus track

1. "Nothing But The Devil" (Capitol Radio broadcast - 18 March 1980) – 3:41

remastered CD bonus track

1. "Hell Cat" – 4:50
2. "The Watcher" – 5:46

== Personnel ==
- Rory Gallagher – vocals, guitars, dulcimer, harmonica, electric sitar
- Gerry McAvoy – bass guitar
- Ted McKenna – drums
