= Against the Grain (Rory Gallagher album) =

Studio album by Rory Gallagher
- Released: 31 October 1975
- Studio: Wessex, London
- Genre: Blues rock
- Length: 44:05 (original); 49:12 (1999 reissue)
- Label: Chrysalis
- Producer: Rory Gallagher

Rory Gallagher chronology
Irish Tour (1974)	Against the Grain (1975)	Calling Card (1976)

Original cover (LP release)

Professional ratings
Review scores
Source	Rating
Allmusic	3/5 stars
Rolling Stone	(not rated)

Against the Grain is the fifth studio album and seventh album overall by Irish musician Rory Gallagher, released in 1975. It was his first album with his new record company Chrysalis. Having previously only released one cover version on a studio album, "Against The Grain" includes two, one by Leadbelly and one from the Porter/Hayes songwriting team. The album received very favourable reviews.

== Background ==
The album name and cover were a play on words. The cover shows the wood "grain" of Gallagher's famous Stratocaster guitar which was well worn from his rigorous tour schedule. At the same time the phrase reflects Gallagher's relation with the music industry, that he always went "against the grain" and played the traditional blues and folk music he loved rather than focusing on singles and more commercially accessible music. As Gallagher himself described his feelings on this a few years later:

"I see music as a lifetime affair, I'm not in it for the big kill and then get out...We've toured the states twenty times now... although we don't have the big album to show off for it. But I'm not competing on that sort of level anyway. It's a conscious decision. I know we're not going to cut it on the smoke bomb/dry ice kick or pull the ridiculous publicity stunts. We're divorced from that circuit. We have a niche and we're staying there. I don't know if we've ever even released a single in the states... I'll never get the regular pop playlists because I don't churn out music that's instant and disposable, like a hamburger, I just don't run that race."

== Reception ==
The album was released at a period when Gallagher was finally achieving some recognition in the United States. Rolling Stone gave the album an excellent review comparing Gallagher favorably to guitar legends Eric Clapton and Alvin Lee. The same review spoke glowingly of Gallagher's band even though a previous Rolling Stone review of the album Deuce had called bassist Gerry McAvoy a "hack" whose bass playing was "highly pedestrian, almost pedantic".

== Track listing ==
All tracks composed by Rory Gallagher except where indicated.

Side 1

1. "Let Me In" – 4:03
2. "Cross Me Off Your List" – 4:26
3. "Ain't Too Good" – 3:54
4. "Souped-Up Ford" – 6:24
5. "Bought and Sold" – 3:24

Side 2

1. "I Take What I Want" – 4:22 (David Porter, Teenie Hodges, Isaac Hayes)
2. "Lost at Sea" – 4:06
3. "All Around Man" – 6:14 (Bo Carter, Rory Gallagher)
4. "Out on the Western Plain" – 3:53 (Lead Belly, arranged by Rory Gallagher)
5. "At the Bottom" – 3:19

CD bonus track

1. "Cluney Blues" – 2:12
2. "My Baby, Sure" – 2:55

== Charts ==
Chart (1976)	Peak position
Australian (Kent Music Report)	68

== Personnel ==
- Rory Gallagher – guitars, vocals
- Gerry McAvoy – bass guitar
- Lou Martin – keyboards
- Rod de'Ath – drums, percussion
