= Rory Gallagher (album) =

Studio album by Rory Gallagher
- Released: 21 May 1971
- Recorded: February 1971
- Studio: Advision Studios, London, England
- Genre: Blues rock
- Length: 47:36 (original release); 55:10 (1998 remaster)
- Label: Polydor
- Producer: Rory Gallagher

Rory Gallagher chronology
Rory Gallagher (1971)	Deuce (1971)

Professional ratings
Review scores
Source	Rating
AllMusic	3/5 stars

Rory Gallagher is the debut solo album by Irish blues rock musician Rory Gallagher, released in 1971. It marked his departure from the first band he formed, Taste. After disbanding Taste, Gallagher auditioned some of the best musicians available at the time. Noel Redding and Mitch Mitchell, the bassist and drummer for the Jimi Hendrix Experience, were among those considered for the new combo. He decided on two Belfast musicians, drummer Wilgar Campbell and bass guitarist Gerry McAvoy, to be the core of his new power trio band.

== Background ==
After practising with Jimi Hendrix's band Noel Redding, Mitch Mitchell and Belfast musicians Gerry McAvoy and Wilgar Campbell at a practice room in Fulham Road, the newly formed band with McAvoy and Campbell got underway recording in Advision Studios. With his first solo album Gallagher continued in the eclectic style that had exemplified his first band, Taste.

The album begins with "Laundromat", which was to become a regular number in his live set. A blues rock song with a classic Gallagher riff, the song was inspired by the public laundromat in the basement of his flat where he lived at the time in Earls Court.

The next song, "Just the Smile", is an acoustic number that was inspired by the British folk revival. It shows the influence of some of Gallagher's favourite English folk musicians such as Richard Thompson, Davy Graham, and Scottish guitarist Bert Jansch. (Gallagher would later record with Jansch.)

"I Fall Apart" has a jazz feel to it and features a guitar solo whose start is slow and introspective and builds to a powerful climax.

"Wave Myself Goodbye" is another acoustic number, a talking blues song featuring New Orleans style piano provided by Vincent Crane from the band Atomic Rooster (Rory's brother Donal had been acting as tour manager for them).

The next two songs, "Hands Up" and "Sinner Boy", were also blues rock that would become standard numbers for his live show.

Gallagher plays saxophone on a jazz number called "Can't Believe It's True".

Also recorded at the time were two blues classics, Muddy Waters' "Gypsy Woman" and "It Takes Time" by Chicago blues legend Otis Rush. Muddy Waters was a teenage hero for Gallagher; they ultimately collaborated on Muddy Waters' album The London Muddy Waters Sessions. These songs were left off the original album but were included in the CD release.

On 3 September 2021 a 50th anniversary edition was released containing alternative takes, bonus tracks, and live material.

== Recording ==
The album was recorded in Advision Studios in London. As with most of Gallagher's albums he produced it himself. The engineer was Eddy Offord, who had engineered for Gallagher on the album On the Boards with his previous band Taste.

== Track listing ==
All tracks composed by Rory Gallagher except where indicated.

Side one

1. "Laundromat" – 4:38
2. "Just the Smile" – 3:41
3. "I Fall Apart" – 5:12
4. "Wave Myself Goodbye" – 3:30
5. "Hands Up" – 5:25

Side two

1. "Sinner Boy" – 5:04
2. "For the Last Time" – 6:35
3. "It's You" – 2:38
4. "I'm Not Surprised" – 3:37
5. "Can't Believe It's True" – 7:16

CD bonus tracks

1. "Gypsy Woman" – 4:02 (Muddy Waters)
2. "It Takes Time" – 3:34 (Otis Rush)

== Personnel ==
- Rory Gallagher – vocals, guitars, alto saxophone, mandolin, harmonica
- Gerry McAvoy – bass guitar, vocals
- Wilgar Campbell – drums, percussion
- Vincent Crane – piano on tracks 4 & 9

Technical

- Eddy Offord – engineer

== Charts ==
Chart performance for Rory Gallagher
Chart (2021)	Peak position
Belgian Albums (Ultratop Flanders)	70
Belgian Albums (Ultratop Wallonia)	45
German Albums (Offizielle Top 100)	16
Irish Albums (OCC)	27
Scottish Albums (OCC)	10
Swiss Albums (Schweizer Hitparade)	13
UK Albums (OCC)	93
