= Calling Card =

Studio album by Rory Gallagher
- Released: October 1976
- Recorded: September 1976
- Studio: Musicland Studios, Munich
- Genre: Blues rock, hard rock, folk rock
- Length: 45:14 (original release); 54:03 (1999 remaster)
- Label: Chrysalis; Buddah (remaster)
- Producer: Roger Glover, Rory Gallagher

Rory Gallagher chronology
Against the Grain (1975)	Calling Card (1976)	Photo-Finish (1978)

Calling Card is the sixth studio album and eighth album overall by Irish singer and guitarist Rory Gallagher. Released in 1976, it marked the second of four albums he released on Chrysalis Records during the 1970s. The album was co-produced by Gallagher and Roger Glover, the bassist for Deep Purple and Rainbow. This collaboration was notable as it was Gallagher's first experience working with a high profile producer and remains his only successful partnership of such collaboration.

Calling Card also marked the end of an era for Gallagher's band, as it was the last album to feature Rod de'Ath on (drums) and Lou Martin on (keyboards). Following the Calling Card tour (1976-1977), Gallagher restructured his line up, retaining only his long-time bass guitarist Gerry McAvoy. He hired Ted McKenna as the new drummer, forming a revised power trio that became his core group from early 1978 until 1980.

== Recording ==
The sessions for the album began in the summer of 1976 at Musicland Studios in Munich, Germany. Roger Glover joined as co-producer after meeting Rory Gallagher during a Deep Purple tour where Gallagher served as the opening act. The choice of Glover signified a conscious attempt by Gallagher to try new directions from the hard rock he was best known for. Calling Card is one of his most diverse albums. It also reflects the synergy that the band had developed after years of playing together. As producer Roger Glover commented “they all seemed very dedicated to Rory, there was an allegiance, born of years of smoky clubs and endless journeys”. This was the fifth and last release featuring this line-up.

== Reaction ==
Professional ratings
Review scores
Source	Rating
Allmusic	4.5/5 stars
Rolling Stone	(not rated)
sputnikmusic	4.5/5 stars

The album is often considered one of Gallagher's finest studio offerings with Allmusic giving the album 4.5 stars out of 5. In its August 2005 issue, Guitar Player's "Oeuvre Easy" feature on Gallagher praised its "brilliant songs" and "rockin' edge" and listed it in the "Inspired" section of his catalogue. Irish folk group The Dubliners later recorded "Barley And Grape Rag" with Gallagher for their 1992 release, 30 Years A-Greying.

== 1999 remaster ==
The album was reissued by Buddah Records in 1999 along with the rest of Gallagher's catalogue. As with the rest of the reissues, the album featured remastered sound, newly written liner notes by Gallagher's brother Donal, and bonus tracks "Rue the Day" and "Public Enemy" (an early version of a track that later appeared on Gallagher's 1979 album Top Priority).

== Track listing ==
All tracks composed by Rory Gallagher.

Side one
No.	Title	Length
1.	"Do You Read Me"	5:20
2.	"Country Mile"	3:18
3.	"Moonchild"	4:48
4.	"Calling Card"	5:24
5.	"I'll Admit You're Gone"	4:25

Side two
No.	Title	Length
6.	"Secret Agent"	5:45
7.	"Jack-Knife Beat"	7:04
8.	"Edged in Blue"	5:31
9.	"Barley and Grape Rag"	3:39

1999 CD bonus tracks
No.	Title	Length
10.	"Rue the Day"	4:14
11.	"Public Enemy (B-Girl Version)"	4:35

2012 CD bonus track
No.	Title	Length
10.	"Where Was I Going to?"	5:27

== Personnel ==
- Rory Gallagher – vocals, guitar and harmonica
- Gerry McAvoy – bass guitar
- Lou Martin – keyboards
- Rod de'Ath – drums

Technical

- Hans Menzel, Mack – engineer

== Charts ==
Chart performance for Calling Card
Chart (1976)	Peak position
UK Albums (OCC)	32

Chart (1998–2026)	Peak position
Greek Albums (IFPI)	41
UK Jazz & Blues Albums (OCC)	1
