= Gerry McAvoy =

Irish blues rock bass guitarist

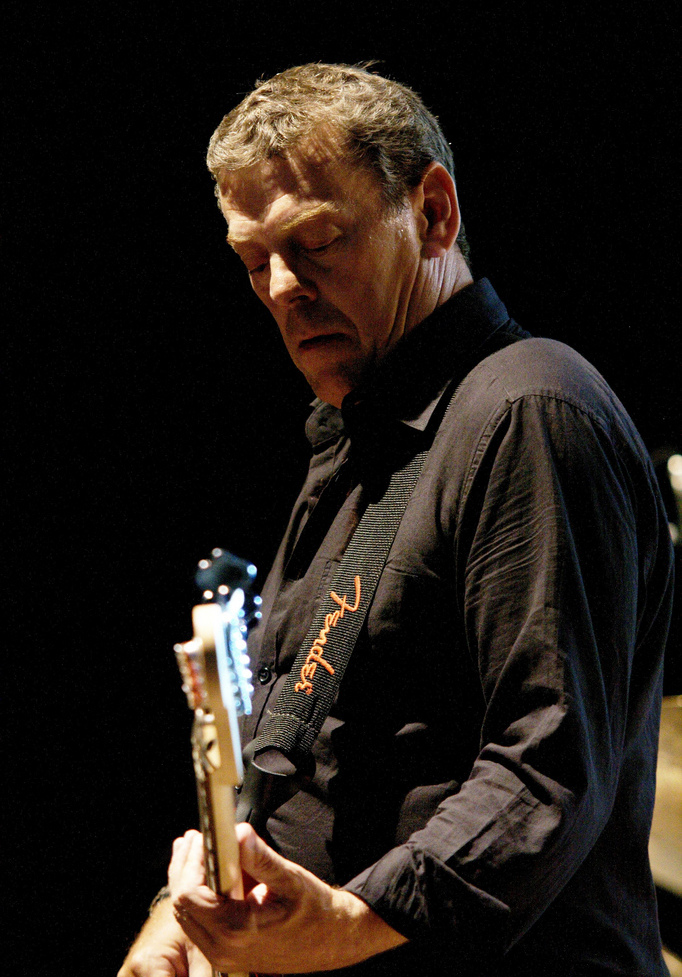
- McAvoy in 2009

Background information
- Born: John Gerard McAvoy; 19 December 1951 (age 74); Belfast, Northern Ireland
- Genres: Blues rock; R&B; rock and roll; soul
- Occupations: Musician; songwriter
- Instruments: Bass guitar; vocals
- Years active: 1967–present
- Labels: Atlantic; Buddah; Polydor; Chrysalis; Castle; Capo; Zed

John Gerard McAvoy (born 19 December 1951) is a Northern Irish blues rock bass guitarist. He played with blues rock musician Rory Gallagher between 1970 and 1991, and then with Nine Below Zero until 2011.

== Biography ==
McAvoy was born in Belfast, Northern Ireland on 19 December 1951. In his youth, he enjoyed listening to his sister's collection of Buddy Holly, Beatles and Rolling Stones records. Aged 13, he bought a second-hand Muddy Waters album in a Belfast record store and later said it "changed my life". He began playing in bands soon afterwards, initially on rhythm guitar before switching to bass.

He later joined the band Deep Joy, playing Motown and 60s pop covers. During his tenure in the band he first played with drummer Brendan O'Neill, who was later to tour with Rory Gallagher and appeared on his last three albums Jinx, Defender and Fresh Evidence. Deep Joy eventually moved to London but split in late 1970, at the same time as Gallagher's band, Taste broke up. During their career, Deep Joy had played support slots to Taste. Gallagher contacted McAvoy, who had returned to Belfast, to come back and rehearse. The pair jammed with latterday Deep Joy drummer Wilgar Campbell, and the trio became Gallagher's first solo touring band.

McAvoy began listening to blues records at an early age. As well as rock and roll, his main influences include Muddy Waters, Paul McCartney and Jet Harris. In his autobiography he cites his brother-in-law (of the same name) as an influence on much of his musical taste. On 18 December 2011 McAvoy performed his last gig (to date) with Nine Below Zero in Leicester, at a venue called 'The Musician'.

He subsequently formed "Gerry McAvoy's Band of Friends". On 15 May 2014, Gerry McAvoy's Band of Friends performed at the Flowerpot in Derby for a celebration of the music of Rory Gallagher and were supported by British acoustic blues singer songwriter, Matt Woosey.

== Riding Shotgun ==
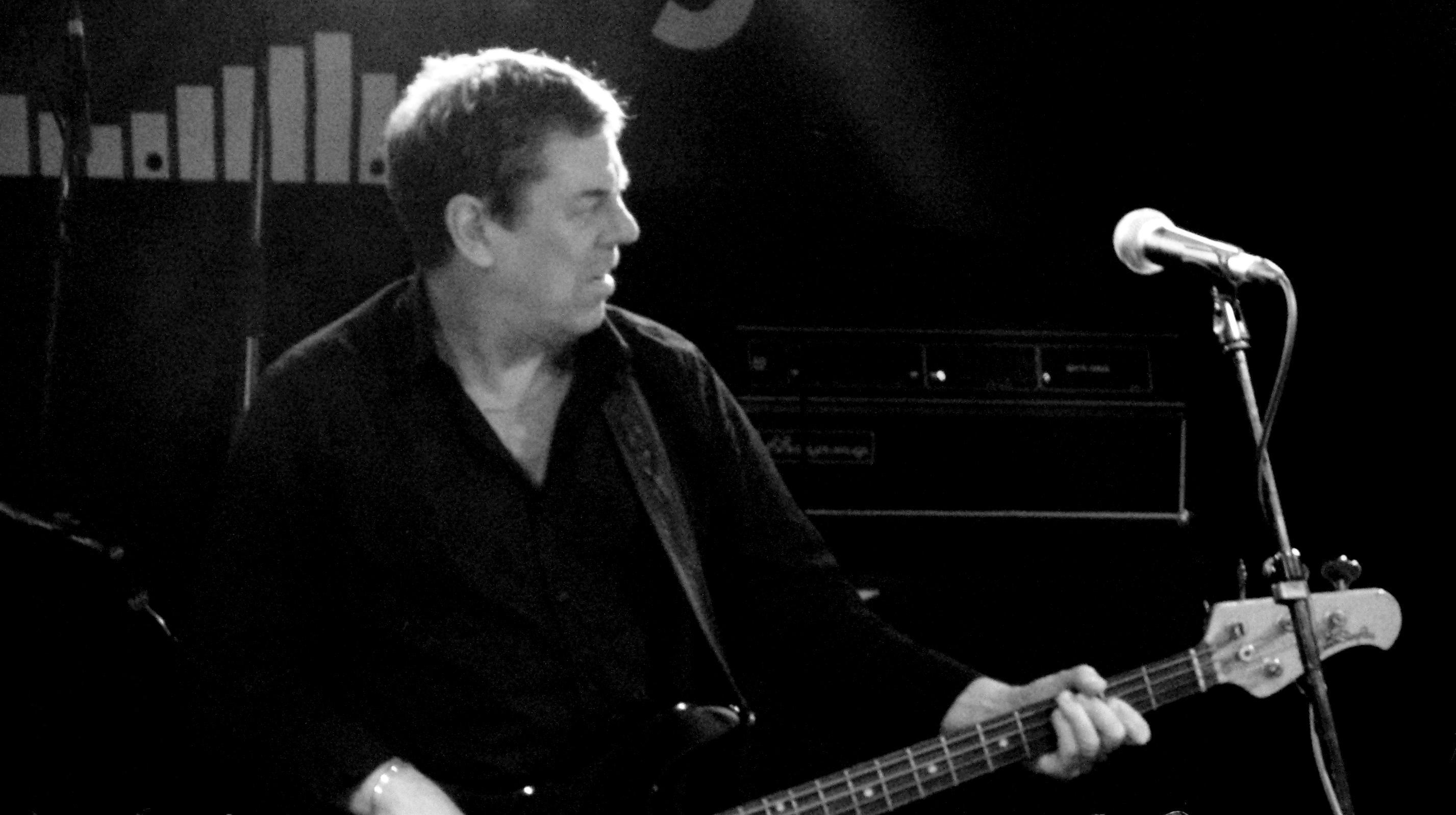
McAvoy with Nine Below Zero, 2009

2005 saw the publication of his biography, Riding Shotgun: 35 Years on the Road with Rory Gallagher and Nine Below Zero. (Published by SPG Triumph, ISBN 9780955032011)

== Discography ==
as Gerry McAvoy

- 1978 - Live - A week at The Bridge E16 (2 tracks on this compilation by Gerry McAvoy Jam)
- 1980 – Bassics
- 2010 – Can't Win 'Em All

with MKO

- MKO (2025)

Other projects

- 2026 Dustin Tomsen - "More Milk & Beer" (track 1 & 6)
