= Live at the Isle of Wight 1970 =

Live at the Isle of Wight 1970, Live at the Isle of Wight Festival 1970, or Live at the Isle of Wight may refer to:

- Live at the Isle of Wight 1970 (Leonard Cohen album) (2009)
- Live at the Isle of Wight Festival 1970 (The Doors album) (2018)
- Live at the Isle of Wight Festival 1970 (Emerson, Lake & Palmer album) (1997)
- Live Isle of Wight '70, a 1991 album by Jimi Hendrix
- Blue Wild Angel: Live at the Isle of Wight, a 2002 album by Jimi Hendrix
- Nothing Is Easy: Live at the Isle of Wight 1970, a 2004 album by Jethro Tull
- Live at the Isle of Wight Festival 1970 (The Moody Blues album) (2008)
- Live at the Isle of Wight (Taste album) (1971)
- Live at the Isle of Wight Festival 1970 (The Who album) (1996)
  - Live at the Isle of Wight Festival 1970 (film) (1998)

== See also ==
- Isle of Wight Festival 1970
