= Live Taste =

Live album by Taste
- Released: February 1971
- Recorded: 31 August 1970
- Venues: Montreux Casino, Montreux, Switzerland
- Genre: Blues rock
- Length: 38:39
- Label: Polydor
- Producer: Tony Colton

Taste chronology
On the Boards (1970)	Live Taste (1971)	Live at the Isle of Wight (1971)

Live Taste is the third album and first live album by Irish rock band Taste. It was recorded live at Montreux Casino in Switzerland in 1970 and released in February 1971, shortly after the band broke up at the end of 1970.

== Track listing ==
1. "Sugar Mama" (traditional; arranged by Rory Gallagher) – 8:13
2. "Gamblin' Blues" (Melvin Jackson) – 6:22
3. "I Feel So Good (Part 1)" (Big Bill Broonzy) – 3:31
4. "I Feel So Good (Part 2)" (Big Bill Broonzy) – 4:02
5. "Catfish" (traditional; arranged by Rory Gallagher) – 10:43
6. "Same Old Story" (Rory Gallagher) – 5:43

== Personnel ==
Taste

- Rory Gallagher – guitars, vocals, harmonica
- Richard "Charlie" McCracken – bass guitar
- John Wilson – drums

== Charts ==
Chart (1971)	Peak position
Australia (Kent Music Report)	35
United Kingdom (Official Charts Company)	14
