= Live at the Isle of Wight (Taste album) =

1971 live album by Taste

Live album by Taste
- Released: 1 December 1971
- Recorded: 28 August 1970
- Venue: Isle of Wight Festival, Isle of Wight
- Genre: Blues rock
- Length: 50:39
- Label: Polydor
- Producer: Tony Colton

Taste chronology
Live Taste (1971)	Live at the Isle of Wight (1971)	In Concert (1977)

Live at the Isle of Wight is the fourth album and second live album by Irish rock band Taste, released in 1971. It was recorded live at the Isle of Wight Festival 1970 and released after the band broke up. The same performance of "Sinner Boy" was also used in the documentary film Message to Love.

The complete show was reissued in 2015 by Eagle Rock Entertainment as What's Going On: Live At The Isle Of Wight on CD, DVD and Blu-Ray.

== Track listing ==
- All tracks composed by Rory Gallagher except where indicated
1. "What's Going On" – 5:41
2. "Sugar Mama" (Traditional; arranged by Rory Gallagher) – 10:18
3. "Morning Sun" – 4:31
4. "Sinner Boy" – 5:31
5. "I Feel So Good" (Big Bill Broonzy) – 10:10
6. "Catfish" (Traditional; arranged by Rory Gallagher) – 14:26

What's Going On: Live At The Isle Of Wight

Live album by Taste
- Released: 23 July 2015
- Recorded: 28 August 1970
- Venue: Isle of Wight Festival, Isle of Wight
- Genre: Blues rock
- Length: 79:13
- Label: Eagle Rock Entertainment
- Producer: Daniel Gallagher

== 2015 reissue ==
1. "What's Going On" – 5:31
2. "Sugar Mama" (Traditional; arranged by Rory Gallagher) – 10:46
3. "Morning Sun" – 4:37
4. "Gambling Blues" (Lil' Son Jackson) – 4:52
5. "Sinner Boy" – 5:41
6. "I'll Remember" – 8:29
7. "I Feel So Good" (Big Bill Broonzy) – 10:25
8. "Catfish Blues" (Traditional; arranged by Rory Gallagher) – 14:14
9. "Same Old Story" – 6:53
10. "Blister on the Moon" – 7:45

== Personnel ==
Taste

- Rory Gallagher – guitars, vocals, harmonica
- Richard "Charlie" McCracken – bass guitar
- John Wilson – drums

2015 reissue

- Producer – Daniel Gallagher
- Mix & Master – Eliot Kissileff
- Art Direction – Mark Jessett
- Cover Photograph – Charles Everest
