= Taste (Taste album) =

Studio album by Taste
- Released: April 1969 (UK); July 1969 (US)
- Recorded: August 1968
- Studio: De Lane Lea Studios, London, England
- Genre: Blues rock, hard rock
- Length: 38:56
- Label: Polydor (Europe); Atco (North America)
- Producer: Tony Colton

Taste chronology
| Taste (1969) | On the Boards (1970) |

Professional ratings
Review scores
| Source | Rating |
|---|---|
| Allmusic | 3/5 stars |

Taste is the debut album by the Irish blues rock band Taste, released in 1969. The album was produced by Tony Colton (1942-2020), a singer, songwriter and producer who was the singer in the band Heads Hands & Feet.

== Track listing ==
All tracks were composed by Rory Gallagher except where stated.

1. "Blister on the Moon" – 3:26
2. "Leavin' Blues" (Huddie Ledbetter, Rory Gallagher) – 4:15
3. "Sugar Mama" (Traditional; arranged by Rory Gallagher) – 7:14
4. "Hail" – 2:35
5. "Born on the Wrong Side of Time" – 4:00
6. "Dual Carriageway Pain" – 3:13
7. "Same Old Story" – 3:32
8. "Catfish" (Traditional; arranged by Rory Gallagher) – 8:04
9. "I'm Moving On" (Hank Snow) – 2:29

== Personnel ==
Taste

- Rory Gallagher – guitars, vocals, saxophone, harmonica
- Richard "Charlie" McCracken – bass guitar
- John Wilson – drums
