= Electric Dylan controversy =

1965 music controversy

In 1965, Bob Dylan, the leading songwriter of the American folk music revival, (Note: Paul Simon suggested that Dylan's early compositions virtually took over the folk genre (Fong-Torres 1973, p. 424).) began recording and performing with electric instruments, generating controversy in the folk music community.

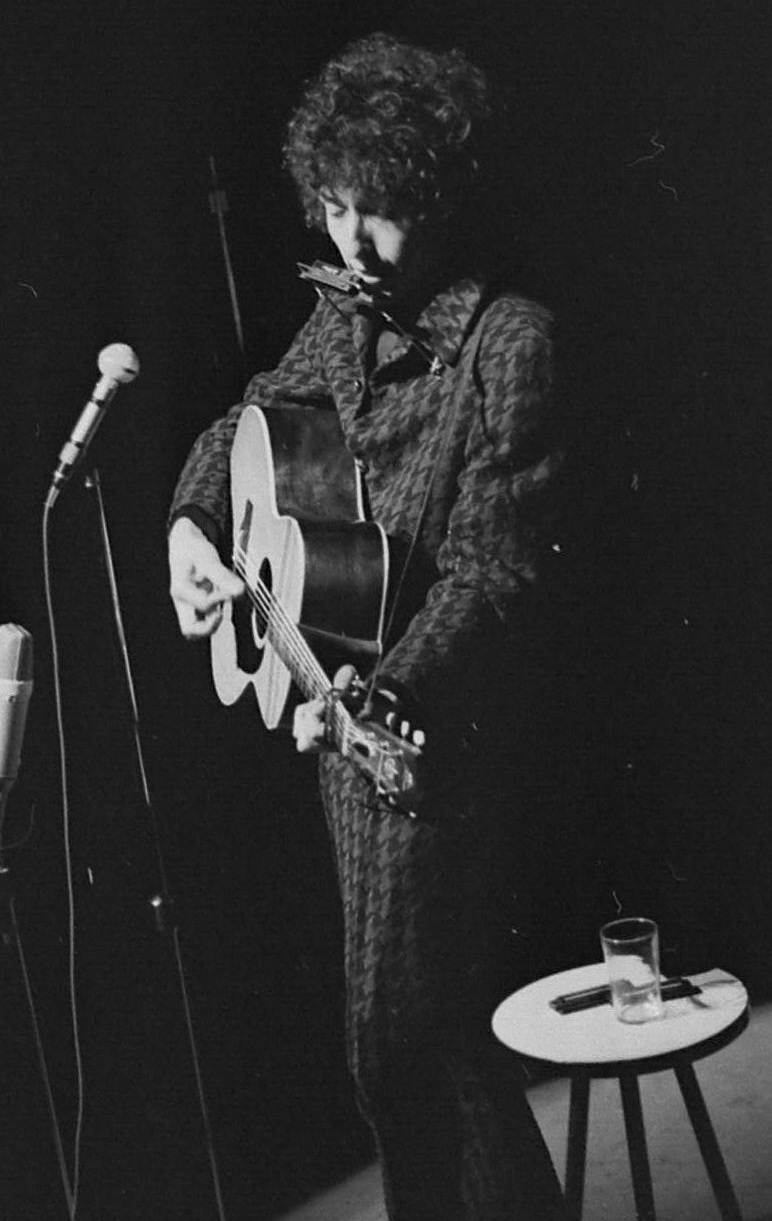
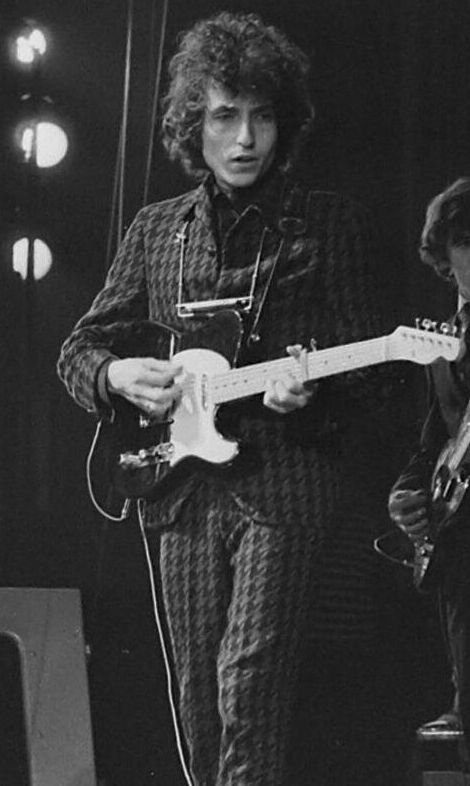
On his 1966 world tour, Bob Dylan would perform the first half of his concert solo with an acoustic guitar and harmonica, while performing the second half with an electric guitar with the Hawks as his backing band.

The response to his albums The Freewheelin' Bob Dylan and The Times They Are a-Changin' led the media to label him the "spokesman of a generation". In March 1965, Dylan released his fifth album, Bringing It All Back Home. Side one features him backed by a rock band, while side two features him accompanying himself on acoustic guitar. In June of that year, Dylan began recording his next album, Highway 61 Revisited, which featured a more fully integrated folk rock sound. After recording a few of the songs, Dylan took a six-week break.

On July 20, 1965, he released his single from that album, "Like a Rolling Stone." Five days later, he took the main stage at the Newport Folk Festival, and performed his first concert with electric instruments: one song from Bringing It All Back Home and two songs from Highway 61 Revisited. He was joined on piano/organ by Barry Goldberg and three members of the Paul Butterfield Blues Band: guitarist Mike Bloomfield, bassist Jerome Arnold and drummer Sam Lay, and also with Al Kooper playing organ or bass—he played bass on "Like a Rolling Stone" while Goldberg played organ.

Some sections of the audience booed the performance. Members of the folk movement, including Irwin Silber (Note: In November 1964, Irwin Silber, the editor of Sing Out!, published an "Open Letter to Bob Dylan" criticizing him for stepping away from political song writing (Shelton 2003, p. 313).) and Ewan MacColl, criticized him for moving away from political songwriting and for performing with a rock band. After Newport, Dylan continued recording Highway 61 Revisited, which featured an electric sound on all but one song. He continued his transformation towards electric music on Blonde on Blonde (1966).

On subsequent tours throughout 1965 and 1966, his electric sets (now backed by the Hawks) were often met with derision from the audience. Crowds became particularly acrimonious during a British tour, including an oft-cited incident in Manchester, where a member of the crowd shouted "Judas!" at Dylan. Shows from this tour have been documented in several Dylan documentaries, including 2005's No Direction Home. Over time, Dylan continued to evolve musically, turning to country music on Nashville Skyline (1969), and drifting through numerous styles throughout the rest of his career. Retrospectively, his electric period has come to be recognized by critics and fans as producing some of his best music, and his controversial performance at Newport has been considered a pivotal moment in the development of folk rock. The incident was portrayed in the 2024 film A Complete Unknown, as well as the 2007 film I'm Not There.

== Newport 1965 set ==
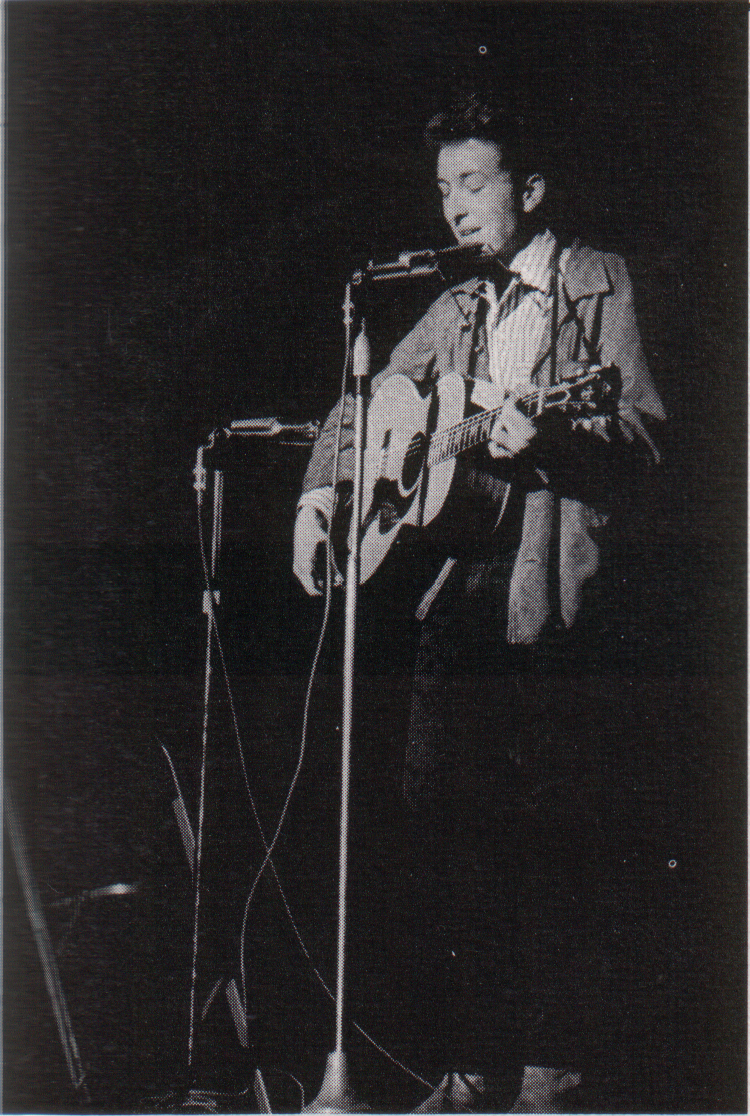
Fans were used to seeing Dylan (pictured 1963) alone with his acoustic setup.

At the 1963 Newport Folk Festival, Dylan had been received enthusiastically when he performed "Blowin' in the Wind" with Joan Baez; Peter, Paul and Mary; and other performers. At the 1964 Newport Folk Festival, Dylan performed "With God on Our Side" and "Mr. Tambourine Man". Positive reviews of Dylan's 1964 performance were accompanied by criticisms of his antics and dismissive nature; one critic wrote that "being stoned had rarely prevented his giving winning performances, but he was clearly out of control". During the same festival, Johnny Cash had played an electric set. Cash, who held major influence over Dylan, also motivated Dylan's break with standard protest-themed folk music with a letter Cash wrote to the editor of Broadside in March 1964, where Cash demanded that people at the Newport Music Festival "shut up and let him sing." At the time of Cash's death in 2003, Dylan stated that "Johnny wrote the magazine saying to shut up and let me sing, that I knew what I was doing. This was before I had ever met him, and the letter meant the world to me. I’ve kept the magazine to this day."

On Saturday, July 24, 1965, Dylan performed three acoustic songs, "All I Really Want to Do", "If You Gotta Go, Go Now", and "Love Minus Zero/No Limit" at a Newport workshop. According to Jonathan Taplin, a roadie at Newport (and later a road manager for the acts of Dylan's manager Albert Grossman), Dylan decided on Saturday he would challenge the Festival by performing with a fully amplified band the following night. Taplin said Dylan had been irritated by what he considered condescending remarks festival organizer Alan Lomax had made introducing the Paul Butterfield Blues Band for an earlier set. According to festival founder George Wein, Lomax said something to the effect of, "Now here we've got these guys, and they need all of this fancy hardware to play the blues... Let's find out if these guys can play it at all." According to Wein, these remarks provoked a fistfight backstage between Lomax and Grossman, who also managed Butterfield. According to Taplin, Dylan's response was, "'Well, fuck them if they think they can keep electricity out of here, I'll do it.' On a whim, he said he wanted to play electric." Dylan assembled a band and rehearsed that night at a mansion being used by festival organizer George Wein.

On the night of Sunday, July 25, Dylan's appearance was between Cousin Emmy and the Sea Island singers, two traditional acts. Dylan's band included two musicians who had played on his recently released single "Like a Rolling Stone": Mike Bloomfield on lead guitar and Al Kooper on organ. Two of Bloomfield's bandmates from the Paul Butterfield Blues Band, bassist Jerome Arnold and drummer Sam Lay, also appeared at Newport, as well as Barry Goldberg on piano and organ. The live organ on "Like a Rolling Stone" at Newport was played by Barry Goldberg. Although Al Kooper played organ on the studio recording of this song, at Newport he switched to bass replacing Jerome Arnold.

Footage of the Newport performance appears in the documentary films Festival (1967), No Direction Home (2005) and The Other Side of the Mirror: Bob Dylan Live at the Newport Folk Festival 1963–1965 (2007). Both boos and cheers are heard a few bars into Dylan's first song, "Maggie's Farm" and continue throughout his second, "Like a Rolling Stone". Dylan and his band then performed "Phantom Engineer", an early version of "It Takes a Lot to Laugh, It Takes a Train to Cry". Dylan was said to have "electrified one half of his audience, and electrocuted the other".

After "Phantom Engineer", Dylan and the band left the stage. Booing and clapping are in the background. When emcee Peter Yarrow returned to the microphone, he begged Dylan to continue performing. According to Robert Shelton, when Dylan returned to the stage, he discovered he did not have the right harmonica and said to Yarrow, "What are you doing to me?" Dylan then asked the audience for "an E harmonica". Within a few moments, a clatter of harmonicas hit the stage. Dylan performed two songs on acoustic guitar for the audience: "Mr Tambourine Man" followed by "It's All Over Now, Baby Blue." The crowd exploded with applause, calling for more. Dylan did not return to the Newport festival for 37 years. In an enigmatic gesture, Dylan performed at Newport in 2002 sporting a wig and fake beard.

=== Audience reaction ===
Newport, Sunday night: There are probably as many different ideas as to what happened, and why, as there are people who saw it happen; following is my version of what may be a momentous occasion in folk music.

— Ed Freeman, The Broadside, August 1965

Joe Boyd, who worked with Paul Rothchild on the sound mixing for the festival, described the audience reaction in his memoir, White Bicycles: Making Music in the 1960s.

By today's standards, the volume wasn't particularly high, but in 1965 it was probably the loudest thing anyone in the audience had ever heard. A buzz of shock and amazement ran through the crowd. When the [first] song finished, there was a roar that contained many sounds. Certainly boos were included, but they weren't in a majority. There were shouts of delight and triumph and also of derision and outrage. The musicians didn't wait to interpret it, they just plunged straight into the second song.

Filmmaker Murray Lerner and others present at Newport argued that the boos were from outraged folk fans who disliked Dylan playing an electric guitar. Others present, including musician Al Kooper, disagreed, arguing that the audience were upset by poor sound quality and the short duration of the set. "The reason they booed is that he only played for fifteen minutes when everybody else played for forty-five minutes or an hour," Kooper would later recall. "They were feeling ripped off. Wouldn't you? They didn't give a shit about us being electric. They just wanted more." According to performers Ian & Sylvia Tyson, it was "an angry, startled reaction" but that "it was a hostile audience" that year for other performers also.

In 2007, Lerner released on DVD his complete footage of Dylan's three appearances at Newport: The Other Side of the Mirror: Bob Dylan Live at the Newport Folk Festival 1963–1965. When interviewed by Mojo magazine, Lerner was asked: "There's been a lot of debate over the years as to who exactly was doing the booing and who were they booing? Dylan? The organizers? The shortness of the set?" Lerner replied: "It's a good question. When we showed the film at The New York Film Festival [in October 2007] one kid gets up and says, 'About this booing... I was sitting right in front of the stage, there was no booing in the audience whatsoever. There was booing from the performers'. So I said, Well, I don't think you're right. Then another kid gets up and says 'I was a little further back and it was the press section that was booing, not the audience', and I said, Well, I don't think you're right. A third guy gets up and says 'I was there, and there was no question, it was the audience that was booing and there was no booing from the stage'. It was fascinating. People remember hearing what they thought they should hear. I think they were definitely booing Dylan and a little bit Pete Yarrow because he was so flustered. He was not expecting that audience's reaction and he was concerned about Bob's image since they were part of the same family of artists through Al Grossman. But I absolutely think that they were booing Dylan going electric."

Interviewed in San Francisco, on December 3, 1965, Dylan was asked whether he was "surprised the first time the boos came?" He responded: "That was at Newport. Well, I did this very crazy thing, I didn't know what was going to happen, but they certainly booed, I'll tell you that. You could hear it all over the place.... I mean, they must be pretty rich, to be able to go some place and boo. I couldn't afford it if I was in their shoes."

=== Controversy around Pete Seeger's reaction ===
Poor sound quality was the reason musician Pete Seeger, who was backstage, gave for disliking the performance: he says he told the audio technicians, "Get that distortion out of his voice ... It's terrible. If I had an axe, I'd chop the microphone cable right now." Seeger has also said, however, that he only wanted to cut the cables because he wanted the audience to hear Dylan's lyrics properly because he thought they were important. Rumors that Seeger actually had an axe, or that a festival board member pulled or wanted to pull out the entire electrical wiring system are apocryphal. In the film No Direction Home, John Cohen of the New Lost City Ramblers, who was Pete Seeger's brother-in-law, states that Seeger wanted to lower the volume of the band because the noise was upsetting his elderly father Charles, who wore a hearing aid. In the same film, Dylan claimed that Seeger's unenthusiastic response to his set was like a "dagger in his heart" and made him "want to go out and get drunk".

According to jazz historian John Szwed, the legend about Pete Seeger cutting the cable or pulling the cords of the acoustic system may have arisen from an actual incident from earlier that afternoon. Szwed writes that Festival organizer Alan Lomax had asked Texas folklorist Mack McCormick, discoverer of Lightnin' Hopkins, to find a Texas prison gang to bring up to Newport to sing work songs, but the Texas Attorney General would not allow it, so McCormick had rounded up a group of ex-convicts. Since they had never performed together in front of an audience, much less a microphone, McCormick wanted to accustom them to the stage before the concert. "But Bob Dylan's electric band had been rehearsing for some time and refused to leave. 'I was trying to tell Dylan, we need the stage', McCormick said. 'He continued to ignore me. So I went over to the junction box and pulled out the cords. Then he listened'."

Joe Boyd recounted events differently in his memoir, White Bicycles: Making Music in the 1960s. The Texas Prisoners Worksong group had been discovered by musicologist Bruce Jackson, who got permission to bring six of them to Newport. A tree stump was placed on the stage which they chopped with axes as they sang. During the performance, a mic cable disconnected. Boyd ducked in and reconnected it, earning a nod of approval from Seeger. Boyd speculates that somehow those ingredients, "Seeger, axes, cables...got muddled up".

Bruce Jackson, another director of the Newport Folk Festival, called the incident "the myth of Newport". Jackson was present at Dylan's 1965 performance and in 2002 reviewed an audio tape of it. Jackson contends that the booing was directed at Peter Yarrow (also a member of the Festival's Board), who upset the crowd when he attempted to keep Dylan's spot to its proper length; Jackson maintains there's nothing to indicate the crowd disliked Dylan's music, electrified or not.

Dylan's move to electric, and specifically the Newport incident, is portrayed in the 2024 biopic A Complete Unknown.

== Concert performances ==
After his Newport appearance, Dylan played an additional two concerts once recording dates for Highway 61 Revisited were finished. The next concert after Newport was on August 28, 1965, at Forest Hills Stadium in Queens, New York. Dylan appears to have believed that the booing at Newport was a consequence of some fans disliking his electric sound. Photographer Daniel Kramer, who accompanied Dylan to the Forest Hills concert, wrote: "Dylan held a conference with the musicians who were going to accompany him in the second half of the concert. He told them that they should expect anything to happen—he probably was remembering what occurred at Newport. He told them that the audience might yell and boo and that they should not be bothered by it. Their job was to make the best music they were capable of, and let whatever happened happen."

Musician Tony Glover, in his liner notes for the Bob Dylan Live 1966 album, quotes a contemporary account of the concert from Variety: "Bob Dylan split 15,000 of his fans down the middle at Forest Hills Tennis Stadium Sunday night... The most influential writer-performer on the pop music scene during the past decade, Dylan has apparently evolved too fast for some of his young followers, who are ready for radical changes in practically everything else... repeating the same scene that occurred during his performance at the Newport Folk Festival, Dylan delivered a round of folk-rock songs but had to pound his material against a hostile wall of anti-claquers, some of whom berated him for betraying the cause of folk music."

The final of the three concerts took place at the Hollywood Bowl on September 3, with the same personnel as six days earlier. Keyboardist Kooper, the only musician other than Dylan who played at all three shows, opted out of joining the upcoming tour when he saw the itinerary went through Dallas. With the JFK assassination less than two years in the past, he thought "...if they didn't like that guy, what are they gonna think of this guy?"

== Dylan tours of 1965 and 1966 ==
After his appearance at Newport and the follow-ups in New York and Los Angeles, Dylan embarked on lengthy tours with a steady band over the next eight months. The polarized responses of Dylan's fans were exacerbated by the structure of his concerts in late 1965 and 1966, the first leg taking place in North America with the second leg more global in scope in 1966. The first half would be 'folk,' Dylan solo accompanying himself on acoustic guitar and harmonica; with the second half 'rock,' Dylan and the Hawks with electric guitars and a full rock and roll combo. The rock segment was often greeted with hostility, as seen in shows in Sheffield and Newcastle upon Tyne in No Direction Home. Footage from the Manchester concert, at the end of that film, includes the "Judas" heckling incident. During a quiet moment in between songs an audience member shouts loudly: "Judas!" Dylan replies: "I don't believe you, you're a liar". Someone on stage tells his band to "Play it fucking loud!" as they launch into "Like a Rolling Stone". This incident was recorded, and the full concert was eventually released in 1998 as Live 1966: The "Royal Albert Hall" Concert in Dylan's Bootleg Series. One fan who claimed to have shouted "Judas!" was John Cordwell; when interviewed by Andy Kershaw he said:

I think most of all I was angry that Dylan... not that he'd played electric, but that he'd played electric with a really poor sound system. It was not like it is on the record [the official album]. It was a wall of mush. That, and it seemed like a cavalier performance, a throwaway performance compared with the intensity of the acoustic set earlier on. There were rumblings all around me and the people I was with were making noises and looking at each other. It was a build-up.

Another claimant to the "Judas!" shout was Keith Butler, who was a student at Keele University. Butler's presence was documented in the film Eat the Document, when the 21-year-old was filmed leaving the Manchester Free Trade Hall, saying "Any pop group could produce better rubbish than that! It was a bloody disgrace! He's a traitor!" In 1999, he took part in a BBC Radio documentary about Live 1966, and asked about his reaction at the time, he replied, "I kind of think: 'You silly young bugger.'"

In 2012, Dylan referred to the incident while addressing criticism that he had not clearly acknowledged his lyrical sources for his new album Tempest:

Wussies and pussies complain about that stuff. It's an old thing—it's part of the tradition. It goes way back. These are the same people that tried to pin the name Judas on me. Judas, the most hated name in human history! If you think you've been called a bad name, try to work your way out from under that. Yeah, and for what? For playing an electric guitar? As if that is in some kind of way equatable to betraying our Lord and delivering him up to be crucified. All those evil motherfuckers can rot in hell.

== Newport 1966 ==
Despite the mixed reaction afforded to Dylan at the 1965 Newport festival, several electric acts appeared at the following year's event, including the Lovin' Spoonful, Howlin' Wolf, Chuck Berry and the Blues Project. The artists were well received and received no pushback over their appearance. In an article recounting the festival for The New York Times, the critic Robert Shelton suggested that the Lovin' Spoonful's warm reception "reflected the growing acceptance of folk-rock and other amalgamations of contemporary folk songs with electric instruments".

== Rediscovery and sale of Dylan's Newport guitar ==
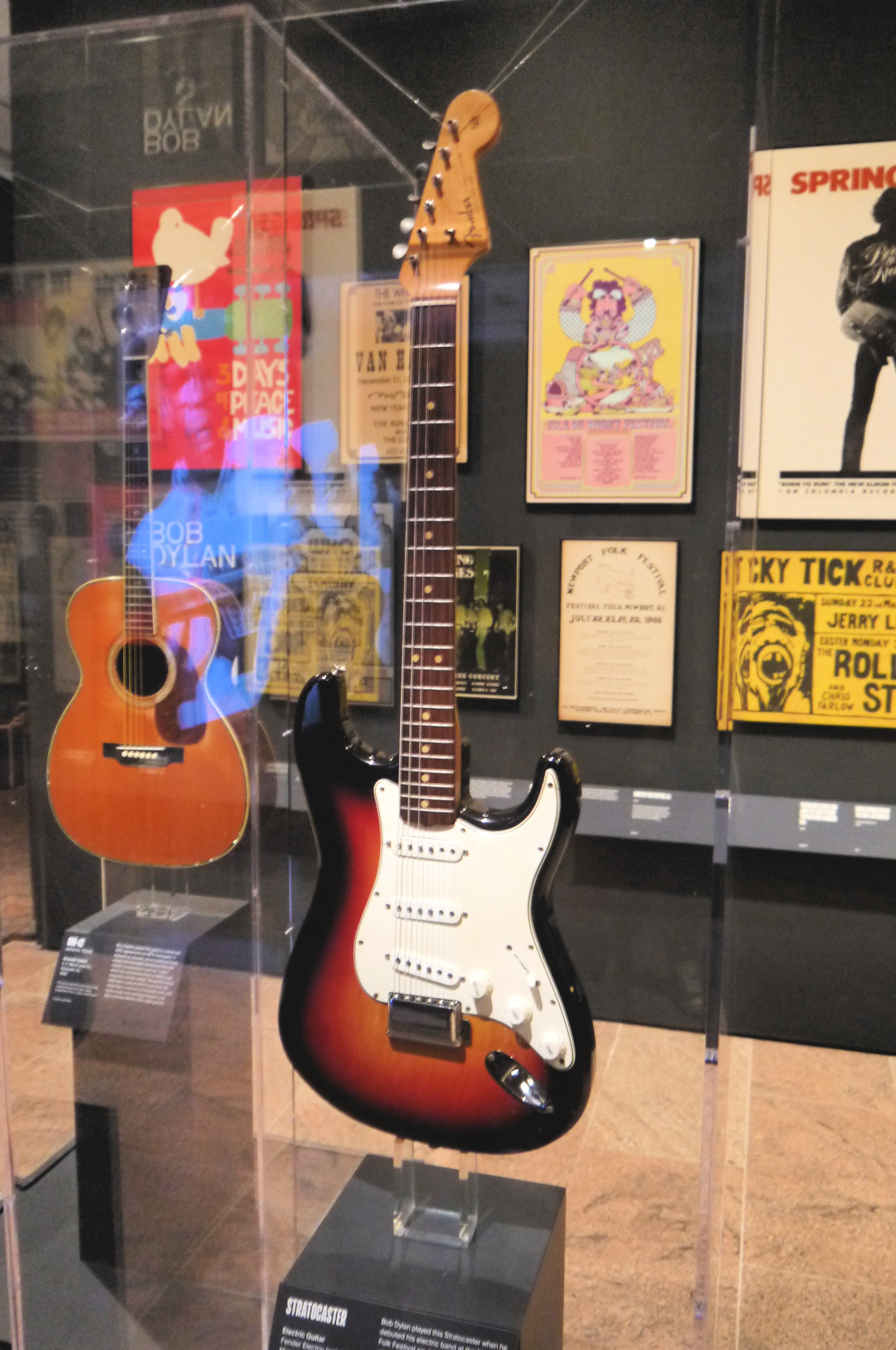
The guitar Dylan played at the 1965 Newport Folk Festival on display at the Metropolitan Museum of Art

In July 2012, an episode of the PBS series History Detectives recounted the story of New Jersey resident Dawn Peterson, who said she had the Fender Stratocaster Dylan played at Newport. She explained that Dylan had left the guitar on a plane piloted by her father, Victor Quinto, in 1965. An instrument specialist was convinced that the guitar was genuine, and lyrics of songs in the guitar case were identified as Dylan's work by a memorabilia collector. However, Dylan's attorney, Orin Snyder, said that Dylan still had the guitar he played at Newport and stated, "He did own several other Stratocaster guitars that were stolen from him around that time, as were some handwritten lyrics."

Dylan and Peterson settled a legal dispute over the guitar, and in December 2013 it was sold by Christie's auction house in New York for $965,000. It was purchased by Jim Irsay, owner of the Indianapolis Colts football team. On July 26, 2015, the guitar was publicly played for the first time in 50 years during a tribute set at the Newport Folk Festival honoring the 50th anniversary of Dylan's performance at Newport. The tribute set included Gillian Welch, Dave Rawlings, Willie Watson, the New Orleans Preservation Hall Jazz Band, Jason Isbell, and several others. Isbell played Dylan's guitar during the tribute set and Newport Folk Festival producer Jay Sweet was quoted as saying "Dylan's guitar is home".

== Concert dates and personnel ==
Date	City	Country	Venue
July 25, 1965	Newport	United States	Freebody Park
August 28, 1965	Queens	United States	Forest Hills Stadium
September 3, 1965	Los Angeles	United States	Hollywood Bowl

=== Personnel ===
- Bob Dylan — vocal, guitars, harmonica, piano
- Mike Bloomfield — electric guitar Newport
- Robbie Robertson — electric guitar Queens and Los Angeles
- Barry Goldberg — piano Newport
- Al Kooper — organ
- Jerome Arnold — bass Newport
- Harvey Brooks — bass Queens and Los Angeles
- Sam Lay — drums Newport
- Levon Helm — drums Queens and Los Angeles
