= On the Boards (album) =

Studio album by Taste
- Released: 9 January 1970
- Recorded: September, October 1969, London
- Genre: Blues rock, jazz, folk rock
- Length: 37:13
- Label: Polydor (Europe); Atco (North America)
- Producer: Tony Colton

Taste chronology
Taste (1969)	On the Boards (1970)	Live Taste (1971)

Singles from On the Boards
- 1. "What's Going On" Released: 1970

Professional ratings
Review scores
Source	Rating
Allmusic	4/5 stars

On the Boards is the second album by Irish rock band Taste. It was recorded in London in September/October 1969 and released on 9 January 1970. It is their final studio album and the release that brought Rory Gallagher to prominence, reaching number 18 on the UK Albums Chart. Reviewers have praised its variety and the precision of its ensemble playing, and noted the jazz inflections of Gallagher's guitar and his unaffected vocals. Lester Bangs dubbed it "impressive ... progressive blues".

== Track listing ==
All tracks composed by Rory Gallagher

1. "What's Going On" – 2:48
2. "Railway and Gun" – 3:38
3. "It's Happened Before, It'll Happen Again" – 6:33
4. "If the Day Was Any Longer" – 2:10
5. "Morning Sun" – 2:39
6. "Eat My Words" – 3:47
7. "On the Boards" – 6:02
8. "If I Don't Sing I'll Cry" – 2:40
9. "See Here" – 3:05
10. "I'll Remember" – 3:02

== Personnel ==
Taste

- Rory Gallagher – guitars, vocals, alto saxophone, harmonica
- Richard "Charlie" McCracken – bass guitar
- John Wilson – drums

with:

- Eddie Kennedy – arrangements

Technical

- Eddy Offord – engineer
