= The Other Side of the Mirror (film) =

2007 documentary film

The Other Side of the Mirror: Bob Dylan at the Newport Folk Festival is a 2007 documentary film about Bob Dylan's appearances at the Newport Folk Festival in three successive years: 1963, 1964, and 1965, directed by Murray Lerner.

The film adds to the footage previously seen in Lerner's Festival! (1967), with full-length song performances. It includes Dylan's controversial electric set from 1965.

This film features previously unseen footage, chronicling the changes in Dylan's style when he appeared at Newport in three successive years. This film was broadcast by BBC Four on October 14, 2007. Director Murray Lerner commented: "Over the course of three Newport gigs, Dylan becomes more conscious of his power. His charisma is startling. With electricity and radio, he did what Yeats, T. S. Eliot and Ezra Pound never achieved. He reached a mass audience with poetry."

== Critical reception ==
The documentary garnered positive reviews from critics. In his review for The New York Times, A.O. Scott picked out Like A Rolling Stone and It's All Over Now, Baby Blue as being "great" versions that "provide a thrilling climax to the film without quite overshadowing the others."

== Chapter List of DVD ==
=== 1963 ===
- "North Country Blues" (7/26 afternoon workshop)
- "With God On Our Side" (with Joan Baez—7/26 afternoon workshop spliced with 7/28 night performance)
- "Talkin' World War III Blues" (7/26 night performance)
- "Who Killed Davey Moore?" (7/27 afternoon workshop)
- "Only a Pawn in Their Game" (7/26 night performance)
- "Blowin' in the Wind" (with The Freedom Singers, Joan Baez, and Peter, Paul and Mary—7/26 night performance)

=== 1964 ===
- "Mister Tambourine Man" (7/24 afternoon workshop)
- Johnny Cash sings "Don't Think Twice, It's All Right" (night performance)
- Joan Baez sings "Mary Hamilton" as Bob Dylan (7/24 night performance)
- "It Ain't Me Babe" (with Joan Baez—7/24 night performance)
- Joan Baez interview
- "With God On Our Side" (with Joan Baez—7/26 night performance)
- "Chimes of Freedom" (7/26 night performance)

=== 1965 ===
- "If You Gotta Go, Go Now" (7/24 afternoon workshop)
- "Love Minus Zero/No Limit" (7/24 afternoon workshop)
- Daytime rehearsal with electric band
- "Maggie's Farm" (7/25 night performance)
- "Like a Rolling Stone" (7/25 night performance)
- "Mr Tambourine Man" (7/25 night performance)
- "It's All Over Now, Baby Blue" (7/25 night performance)

== Certifications ==
Region	Certification	Certified units/sales
Australia (ARIA)	Platinum	15,000^{^}
United States (RIAA)	Gold	50,000^{^}
^{^} Shipments figures based on certification alone.
