= A Different Kind of Blue =

- Directed by: Murray Lerner
- Produced by: Murray Lerner
- Starring: Miles Davis
- Distributed by: Eagle Vision
- Release date: 16 November 2004
- Running time: 127:00

Miles Electric: A Different Kind of Blue is a 2004 DVD presenting footage of Miles Davis' performance at the British Isle of Wight Festival on August 29, 1970. The film presents interview clips with all of the band's participants as well as from a range of other musicians who were in Davis' musical orbit during the same period such as Carlos Santana.

This DVD was, for a long time, the only legitimately available recording of Miles' full Isle of Wight set. (Previously an excerpt had been distributed on a limited release 1970s LP of Columbia Records popular music, with the title, Call It Anything.) A few years after its release, a CD was issued in 2011 with this performance, Bitches Brew Live.

The performance of "Call It Anything" was also used in the documentary film Message to Love by the same director.
