= Message to Love =

1997 film by Murray Lerner

Message to Love: The Isle of Wight Festival 1970
- Paul Rodgers of the band Free during their performance of "All Right Now"
- Directed by: Murray Lerner
- Written by: Murray Lerner
- Produced by: Murray Lerner
- Edited by: Greg Sheldon (performance sequences); Stanley Warnow (as Stan Warnow); Einar Westerlund
- Production company: Castle Music Pictures
- Distributed by: Strand Releasing
- Release dates: October 9, 1995 (U.K.); February 21, 1997 (U.S.)
- Running time: 127 minutes
- Country: United States
- Language: English

Message to Love is a feature documentary film of the Isle of Wight Festival 1970. Directed and produced by Murray Lerner, the film includes performances by popular rock acts, such as Jimi Hendrix, the Who, and the Doors, as well as folk and jazz artists, such as Joni Mitchell and Miles Davis. The title of the film is taken from a song by Hendrix.

Due to financial difficulties, Message to Love was not released until 1995 in the UK and 1997 in the US, after premiering at a San Jose film festival in 1995. A soundtrack album was also issued by Castle Communications/Sony Legacy in 1997.

== Background ==
The film often comically depicts the myriad problems associated with the chaotic festival – the main program of which was held on 26–30 August 1970 – including gate-crashing, numerous crowd incursions onto the stage, Kris Kristofferson being booed offstage, and head promoter Rikki Farr's rants against the audience, which only intensified as the situation deteriorated: "We put this festival on, you bastards, with a lot of love! We worked for one year for you pigs! And you wanna break our walls down and you wanna destroy it? Well you go to hell!" In addition, several near-riots occurred over the price of tickets, as well as during several of the performances that took place over the weekend, especially Jimi Hendrix's last billed performance in England.

== Production ==
The filming used eight cameras, and took 175 hours of 16mm and 35mm Ektachrome footage, which was later edited down to approximately 78 minutes of music and 41 minutes of interviews and announcements. All of the headliners were captured, only Sly Stone and Chicago refused permission to be filmed.

== Release ==
The 1996 version of the film was given a certificate of 15, with the 1999 extended edition being rated 18 for nudity. BBC2 premiered the film for the 25th anniversary of the festival. The VHS was released a month later by Castle. The Region 1 DVD was released in 1997, with the Region 2 DVD being released in 2003 by Castle.

== Performances in order of appearance in the film ==
1. Jimi Hendrix: "Message to Love" (Sunday) †
2. The Who: "Young Man Blues" (Saturday)
3. Free: "All Right Now" (Sunday)
4. Taste: "Sinner Boy" (Friday)
5. Tiny Tim: "There'll Always Be an England" (Saturday)
6. John Sebastian: "Red Eye Express" (Saturday)
7. Donovan: "Catch the Wind" (Sunday) snippet
8. Ten Years After: "I Can't Keep from Crying Sometimes" (Saturday)
9. The Doors: "When the Music's Over" (Saturday)
10. The Moody Blues: "Nights in White Satin" (Sunday)
11. Kris Kristofferson: "Me and Bobby McGee" (Wednesday)
12. Joni Mitchell: "Woodstock" (Saturday)
13. Mitchell: "Big Yellow Taxi"
14. Miles Davis: "Call It Anything" (Saturday)
15. Leonard Cohen: "Suzanne" (Sunday)
16. Emerson, Lake & Palmer: "Pictures at an Exhibition" (Saturday)
17. Hendrix: "Machine Gun" †
18. Hendrix: "Voodoo Child (Slight Return)"
19. Joan Baez: "Let It Be" (Sunday)
20. Jethro Tull: "My Sunday Feeling" (Sunday)
21. The Doors: "The End" (Saturday) †
22. Great Awakening: "Amazing Grace"
23. Hendrix: "Foxy Lady"
24. The Who: "Naked Eye"
25. Bob Dylan: "Desolation Row" (studio version played over the end credits)

" † " indicates songs that are not included on the CD.

== Reception ==
Message to Love
Review scores
Source	Rating
AllMusic	3/5 stars
Rotten Tomatoes	100%
TV Guide	3/4 stars

Time Out magazine said "The music is exemplary stuff to anyone who heard it the first time around – the Doors, Free, Kris Kristofferson (who eventually stormed off stage), the Who, Miles Davis (silhouetted against the dusk), Jethro Tull – but it's the hilarity of the sound-bites that makes this really worth catching."

TV Guide said "Lerner's sharp, devastingly funny film, which was to be financed by the profits, remained one of its greatest casualties – until now. Lerner managed to capture all the hilarious backstage wheeling and dealing, as well as some of the era's best live music."

The Austin Chronicle said "because Message to Love does such a fine job of underscoring the ideology of a generation in conflict with the commercialism of festivals like Wight, it's easy to forget about the quality performances captured by Lerner over the five days that the festival raged".

Deseret News said "Though the performances are great, the 'warts-and-all' approach the film takes elevates it from being just a good music documentary to a great one." The Independent suggested the film was "twice as entertaining if you fast- forwarded through the music".

Variety magazine said this expertly-edited film had "a far deeper historical insight than similar pics from its original era", adding "images are in good shape, and sound quality is excellent." At the Boston Society of Film Critics Awards in 1997, the film was nominated for Best Documentary. Rolling Stone placed it at number 21 in their list of the greatest rock documentaries. Vulture.com included the film at number 37 on their list of the best music documentaries of all time. Musicoholics had it at number 37 on their list of Legendary Music Documentaries. It was listed at number five on the list of Top 10 Music Festival Documentaries.

== Soundtrack ==
Message to Love: The Isle of Wight Festival 1970

Live album by Various artists
- Released: 29 October 1996
- Recorded: 26–30 August 1970
- Venues: Afton Down Farm, Isle of Wight
- Genres: Rock, Folk, Jazz
- Length: 144:00
- Label: Sony Music
- Producer: Jon Astley

The Message to Love soundtrack album was released as a 2-CD set in 1997. It also includes dialogue from the film placed in between some of the tracks.

=== Track listing ===
Disc one

1. Free – "All Right Now" – 4:54
2. Jethro Tull – "My Sunday Feeling" – 4:24
3. Leonard Cohen – "Suzanne" – 4:27
4. Jimi Hendrix – "Foxy Lady" – 5:31
5. Jimi Hendrix – "Voodoo Child (Slight Return)" – 8:56
6. Ten Years After – "Can't Keep from Cryin'/Extension on One Chord" – 11:50
7. Kris Kristofferson – "Me and Bobby McGee" – 5:44
8. Joni Mitchell – "Big Yellow Taxi" – 3:46
9. Joni Mitchell – "Woodstock" – 4:04
10. Emerson, Lake & Palmer – "Blue Rondo à la Turk/Pictures at an Exhibition/Drum Solo" – 7:35
11. The Doors – "When the Music's Over" – 11:46

Disc two

1. The Who – "Young Man Blues" – 5:54
2. The Who – "Naked Eye" – 6:23
3. Tiny Tim – "There'll Always Be an England" – 1:15
4. Taste – "Sinner Boy" – 5:11
5. Joan Baez – "Let It Be" – 3:53
6. The Moody Blues – "Nights in White Satin" – 5:23
7. Donovan – "Catch the Wind" – 3:51
8. Family – "Weaver's Answer" – 7:22 (not in the film)
9. John Sebastian – "Red Eye Express" – 3:58
10. Miles Davis – "Call It Anything" – 14:56
11. Great Awakening – "Amazing Grace" – 3:47
12. Bob Dylan – "Desolation Row" – 11:43

== Legacy ==
In recent years, Lerner's copious 16mm concert footage has been repurposed to create a wealth of complete-performance album and DVD releases:

- The Who – Live at the Isle of Wight Festival 1970 (1998)
- Hendrix – Blue Wild Angel (2002)
- Miles Davis – Miles Electric – A Different Kind of Blue (2004)
- Jethro Tull – Nothing Is Easy: Live at the Isle of Wight 1970 (2005)
- Emerson, Lake & Palmer – The Birth of a Band: Isle of Wight 1970 (2006)
- Free – Free Forever DVD (2006)
- The Moody Blues – Threshold of a Dream: Live at the Isle of Wight Festival 1970 (2008)
- Leonard Cohen – Leonard Cohen Live at the Isle of Wight 1970 (2009)
- Taste – Live at the Isle of Wight (2015)
- The Doors – Live at the Isle of Wight Festival 1970 (2018)
- Joni Mitchell – Both Sides Now: Live at the Isle of Wight Festival 1970 (2018)

The quote "We put this festival on, you bastards, with a lot of love! We worked for one year for you pigs! And you wanna break our walls down and you wanna destroy it? Well you go to hell!" said towards the crowd by the festival's MC Rikki Farr, was used as the intro for the song Fuckin’ in the Bushes, the first song on Oasis’ 2000 album Standing on the Shoulder of Giants
