= Stud (band) =

1970s British rock band

- Genres: Rock
- Years active: 1970s
- Labels: Deram, BASF, Long Hair, Free

Stud is an English/Northern Irish rock band from the early 1970s, that featured two members of Taste – bassist Charlie McCracken and drummer John Wilson – along with former Family and Eric Burdon & the Animals member – guitarist John Weider – and ex Blossom Toes member Jim Cregan.

== History ==
The band began as a trio featuring Cregan (born James Cregan, 9 March 1946, in Yeovil, Somerset), McCracken (born Richard McCracken, 26 June 1948, in Omagh, County Tyrone, Northern Ireland) and Wilson (born 6 November 1947, in Belfast, Northern Ireland), following the split of Rory Gallagher's Taste on 31 December 1970, then joined by ex Family violinist Weider (born 21 April 1947, in Shepherd's Bush, London) in June 1971. Their debut LP was released by Deram, but achieved little success. Due to poor sales, Deram declined to produce a follow-up.

Gaining more success in Germany while touring and featured on TV, the band signed to BASF label and released their second album in 1972, housed in a memorable gatefold cover. Nevertheless, the band split soon after. A third album was released posthumously by BASF. Wilson tried to resurrect the band by recruiting Andy Sneddon (bass, ex East of Eden) and Snowy White (guitar), but this line-up never recorded and dissolved.

== Post Stud projects ==
Jim Cregan joined Family on bass in August 1972 and was later in Cockney Rebel and Rod Stewart's band. Richard McCrecken joined for a revamped Spencer Davis Group and Fastway. Wilson took part in a mid 70s incarnation of Skid Row, joining Brush Shiels. He later continued playing sessions and live work in Belfast. Snowy White joined Pink Floyd as a touring musician, Thin Lizzy and worked as a solo artist.

== Discography ==
=== Stud (Deram Records, 1971) ===
Track Listing

Side One

1. "Sail On" – (Jim Cregan, Richard McCracken, John Wilson) – 4:12
2. "Turn Over The Pages" – (Cregan) – 4:17
3. "1112235" – (Cregan, McCracken, Wilson) – 12:20

Side Two

1. "Harpo's Head" – (Cregan, McCracken, Wilson) – 7:35
2. "Horizon" – (Cregan, McCracken, Wilson) – 11:07
  - "Here – Part 1"
  - "There – Part 2"
3. "Song" – (Cregan) – 2:33

Personnel

- Jim Cregan – lead and acoustic guitars, lead vocals
- Richard McCracken – bass, double bass
- John Wilson – drums

=== September (BASF Records, 1972) ===
Track Listing

Side One

1. "Good Things" – (John Weider) – 4:00
2. "God Knows" – (Jim Cregan, Richard McCracken) – 6:03
3. "Corner" – (McCracken) – 1:50
4. "Life Without Music" – (Weider) – 7:22
5. "Samurai" – (Cregan) – 2:21

Side Two

1. "Five To Mid-day" – (Cregan) – 6:05
2. "Prelude" – (Weider) – 2:10
3. "Bad Handlin" – (Weider) – 3:30
4. "Ocean Boogie" – (Cregan) – 3:25
5. "Red Wine" – (Weider) – 4:23

Personnel

- Jim Cregan – lead electric guitar, acoustic guitar, lead vocals
- John Weider – rhythm electric guitar, violin, piano, vocals
- Richard McCracken – bass guitar, acoustic guitar
- John Wilson – drums, percussion

=== Goodbye: Live at Command (BASF Records, 1973) ===
Track Listing

Side One

1. "Samurai" – (Jim Cregan) – 2:45
2. "Big Bill's Banjo Bend" – (John Weider) – 1:07
3. "Horizon" – (Cregan, Wilson, McCracken) – 19:48

Side Two

1. "Ocean Boogie" – (Cregan) – 3:27
2. "Harpo's Head No. 2" – (Cregan, Wilson, McCracken) – 16:52

Personnel

- Jim Cregan – lead electric guitar, acoustic guitar, lead vocals
- John Weider – rhythm electric guitar, violin, piano, vocals
- Richard McCracken – bass guitar, acoustic guitar
- John Wilson – drums, percussion
