= Secrets of the Reef =

1957 documentary film

Secrets of the Reef is a documentary film directed by Murray Lerner, Lloyd Ritter and Robert M. Young. Filmed in the early 1950s at Marine Studios/Marineland of Florida, the production was headed by Al Butterfield of New Jersey. Three cinematographers were hired to do the camera work: Robert (Bob) Young, Murray Lerner and Lloyd Ritter.

The film premiered in New York City in 1957. Subsequently, the original footage was divided into 13 half-hour productions called Wonders of the Sea and was distributed for years to schools and media throughout the United States.

All the original footage was shot in 16mm using the circular and rectangular oceanariums and special aquariums to house individual or multiple specimens.
