= What's Going On (Taste song) =

1970 rock song

Single by Taste

from the album On the Boards
- B-side: "Morning Sun"
- Released: 1970
- Recorded: 1968
- Genre: Rock
- Length: 2:48
- Label: Polydor
- Songwriter(s): Rory Gallagher
- Producer(s): Tony Colton

"What's Going On" is a 1970 song by the blues rock band Taste written by Rory Gallagher and produced by Tony Colton. The song was a major hit for Taste.

Taste's A-side, a driving rock song, and the B-side boogie "Morning Sun", were taken from 1968 sessions for Taste's second album On the Boards and released by Taste's manager and Polydor without Gallagher's knowledge; going straight to No.1 in Germany, where the previous single "Born On The Wrong Side Of Time" had already been a hit, before Gallagher knew anything about it. By the time Gallagher had complained to Polydor the single had also entered the UK Top 10 and was unstoppable. Gallagher, who wanted to build the trio's image around serious blues music, not rock, was not happy with the record company having the say on the choice of "commercial" singles, and the other two members of the trio, John Wilson and Charlie McCracken, sided with Gallagher. After this single Taste performed at the Isle of Wight Festival in August 1970, but Gallagher quit Polydor on the last day of the year and left Taste to work on solo projects.
