= Murray Lerner =

American filmmaker

- Born: May 8, 1927; Philadelphia, Pennsylvania, U.S.
- Died: September 2, 2017 (aged 90); New York City, New York, U.S.
- Occupations: film director, producer, screenwriter, and cinematographer.
- Years active: 1956-2017
- Spouse: Judith (Levine) Lerner
- Children: 1 son (Noah)
- Awards: Academy Award for Best Documentary Feature. 1980; From Mao to Mozart: Isaac Stern in China

Murray Lerner (May 8, 1927 – September 2, 2017) was an American documentary and experimental film director and producer.

== Career ==
Lerner was born May 8, 1927, in Philadelphia, Pennsylvania to Nacham and Goldie (Levine) Lerner. Murray's father left the family shortly after his birth. He was raised by his mother in Brooklyn, New York, where he graduated from high school.

Lerner attended Harvard University on a full scholarship. He helped start a film production society at Harvard and began teaching himself the art of filmmaking. Lerner graduated from Harvard in 1947 with a degree in Poetry. His first feature-length film, released in 1956, was the underwater documentary Secrets of the Reef which he co-directed with Lloyd Ritter and Robert M. Young.

The filmmaker's break-through was the 1967 documentary Festival! which featured highlights from the Newport Folk Festival in 1963 through 1966. The film, nominated for an Oscar in 1968, captured performances by folk and blues icons such as Bob Dylan, Joan Baez, Donovan, Peter, Paul & Mary, Howlin' Wolf, Mississippi John Hurt, and Son House.

Lerner filmed the Isle of Wight Festival 1970 in England in its entirety, with seven crews. After the promoters declared bankruptcy, Lerner fought a four-year battle in the British courts, eventually winning the rights to his footage.

From the 1990s through his death, Lerner used the footage to produce a series of documentaries centered on the festival, including Message to Love: The Isle of Wight Festival (1995) and separate films on performances by Jimi Hendrix (1991), The Who (1996), Miles Davis (2004), Jethro Tull (2005), Emerson, Lake & Palmer (2006), Bob Dylan (2007), The Moody Blues (2008), Leonard Cohen (2009), Rory Gallagher's band Taste (2015), The Doors (2018), and Joni Mitchell (2018).

Perhaps the most significant of Lerner's works is the 1979 documentary From Mao to Mozart: Isaac Stern in China, which won the Academy Award for Best Documentary the next year. The film was preserved by the Academy Film Archive in 2000.

== Death ==
Lerner died of kidney failure on September 2, 2017, at his home in Long Island City, Queens, New York. He was survived by his wife of 60 years, the former Judith Levine, his son Noah and two grandchildren.

== Selected filmography ==
- Secrets of the Reef (1956)
- Festival (1967) (Oscar-nominated documentary about the Newport Folk Festival, 1963–65)
- From Mao to Mozart: Isaac Stern in China (1980) (Oscar winner for best documentary about Western culture breaking into the Far East)
- Magic Journeys (1982) (Created for the Epcot Center; was the first 3D motion picture to feature computer generated 3D animation and also featured a Sherman Brothers title song throughout the duration of the film)
- Message to Love: The Isle of Wight Festival (1995) (Documentary of the 1970 Isle of Wight Festival)
- Listening To You: The Who At The Isle Of Wight Festival (1996)
- Blue Wild Angel: Jimi Hendrix at the Isle of Wight (2002)
- Miles Electric: A Different Kind of Blue (2004)
- Nothing is Easy: Jethro Tull at the Isle of Wight (2005)
- Emerson, Lake & Palmer (The Birth Of A Band: Isle of Wight 1970) (2006)
- Amazing Journey: The Story of The Who (2007)
- The Other Side of the Mirror: Bob Dylan at the Newport Folk Festival (2007) (Dylan footage from the Newport Folk Festival, 1963–65)
- The Moody Blues (Threshold of a Dream: Live at the Isle of Wight Festival 1970) (2008)
- Leonard Cohen (Leonard Cohen Live at The Isle of Wight 1970) (2009)
- Taste (What's Going On Live At The Isle of Wight 1970) (2015)
- The Doors: Live at the Isle of Wight Festival 1970 (2018)
- Joni Mitchell: Both Sides Now. Live at the Isle of Wight Festival 1970 (2018)
