= Live at the Isle of Wight Festival 1970 (Emerson, Lake & Palmer album) =

Live album by Emerson, Lake & Palmer
- Released: 1997
- Recorded: Isle of Wight Festival; 29 August 1970
- Genre: Progressive rock
- Length: 68:01
- Label: Manticore Records; Sanctuary Records
- Producer: Emerson, Lake & Palmer

Emerson, Lake & Palmer chronology
Live in Poland (1997)	Live at the Isle of Wight Festival 1970 (1997)	Then & Now (1998)

Professional ratings
Review scores
Source	Rating
AllMusic	3/5 stars
Classic Rock	4/5 stars

Live at the Isle of Wight Festival 1970 is an album by British progressive rock band Emerson, Lake & Palmer, recorded at the Isle of Wight Festival in 1970 and released on CD in 1997. At this concert ELP played "Pictures at an Exhibition".

== Track listing ==
1. "The Barbarian" (5:07)
2. "Take a Pebble" (11:47)
3. "Pictures at an Exhibition" (34:30)
  1. "Promenade" (1:38)
  2. "The Gnome" (3:46)
  3. "Promenade – The Sage" (5:32)
  4. "The Old Castle – Blues Variation" (8:35)
  5. "Promenade" (1:26)
  6. "Baba Yaga" (7:33)
  7. "The Great Gates of Kiev" (7:20)
4. "Rondo" (6:12)
5. "Nut Rocker" (4:49)
6. "Interview" (8:16)

== Personnel ==
- Keith Emerson – Hammond organ, piano, Moog synthesizer
- Greg Lake – bass guitar, acoustic guitar, vocals
- Carl Palmer – drums, percussion

== Production ==
- Producer: Emerson, Lake & Palmer
- Engineer: Stephen Baker
- Mastering: Jeff Gilhart
- Artwork: Alan Ticheler
- Liner Notes: Bruce Plato
