= Live at the Isle of Wight 1970 (Leonard Cohen album) =

Live album by Leonard Cohen
- Released: October 20, 2009
- Recorded: August 31, 1970
- Venue: The Isle of Wight festival
- Genre: Folk
- Length: 79:35
- Label: Sony; Columbia
- Producer: Steve Berkowitz CD - Murray Lerner DVD

Leonard Cohen chronology
Live in London (2009)	Live at the Isle of Wight 1970 (2009)	Songs from the Road (2010)

Live at the Isle of Wight 1970 is a combo CD/DVD live album by Canadian singer-songwriter Leonard Cohen. Released in October 2009, it is his nineteenth album. The album was recorded at the 1970 Isle of Wight Festival.

== Background ==
Cohen reluctantly agreed to tour Europe after his second album, Songs from a Room, became a hit in England, reaching #2 on the charts. He was backed by a small country-influenced band called The Army that included guitarist Ron Cornelius and fiddle player Charlie Daniels. The group had been assembled by Cohen's new producer Bob Johnston, who also assumed keyboard duties. Cohen was scheduled to perform on the last day of the festival and had the unenviable task of following Jimi Hendrix. As can be seen in the footage shot by award-winning director Murray Lerner, the vibes at the festival were not good, with many fans upset that a wall had been erected to keep non-paying fans outside the concert grounds. A shaggy-haired Cohen appeared in the early morning of August 31, 1970 in front of an estimated crowd of at least 600,000. As Kris Kristofferson, who had played his own troubled set earlier, recalls on the Leonard Cohen Live at the Isle of Wight 1970 DVD:

I think it was about four o'clock in the morning they went in and woke him up in his trailer and he took a long time to get out to the stage. Everybody had been sittin' there in the filth, in their own squalor - half a million people there - for five days. And Leonard finally came out of his trailer and he was wearing his pyjamas...I never have known why they didn't just hoot him off the stage like they did with a lot of people, especially me! I can only think that he was such an honest performer and didn't scramble after anybody's attention. He took his time gettin' out there, he took his time tunin' up and he wasn't intimidated by a half million people who'd been very ugly.

It was very late when Cohen, chin stubbled and now wearing a khaki safari jacket and jeans, finally took the stage. In the liner notes to the album, film director Murray Lerner confesses to Sylvie Simmons: "As I watched him walk out there I thought this is going to be a disaster. Because the mood was still very mixed. There was definitely a sense of bad feeling, though there was also a sense of people being tired and not so aggressive as earlier. But Cohen was essentially acoustic, just as Kristofferson was, and I thought the crowd would be expecting a bigger high in terms of the sound of the music. I worried that what happened to Kristofferson would happen to him." After glaring out at the darkness and strapping on his guitar, Cohen began by telling a story about his father taking him to the circus when he was a boy. Leonard did not much like the circus, he told them sedately, but he had enjoyed the part when a man would ask everyone in the audience to light a match. He then asked the audience to do the same so he could see where they were. Almost from the moment he began speaking, the mood of the crowd changed, and when he began singing - starting with "Bird on the Wire" - many of them became transfixed. Kristofferson later commented to Cohen biographer Ira Nadel in the 1996 book Various Positions: A Life of Leonard Cohen that the Canadian singer "did the damndest thing you ever saw: he Charmed the Beast. A lone sorrowful voice did what some of the best rockers in the world had tried for three days and failed."

Most of the songs that Cohen performs are from his first two albums, Songs of Leonard Cohen and Songs From a Room, although three songs - "Diamonds in the Mine," "Famous Blue Raincoat" and "Sing Another Song, Boys" would appear on his next studio album Songs of Love and Hate in 1971, with the latter being culled directly from the Isle of Wight appearance. Cohen also speaks about the origins of some of the songs, revealing to the crowd that he had written "One of Us Cannot Be Wrong" in a peeling room in the Chelsea Hotel when he was "coming off amphetamine and pursuing a blond lady that [he] met in a Nazi poster." He also dedicated "Seems So Long Ago, Nancy" to the woman he knew who in 1961, "went into the bathroom and blew her head off with her brother's shotgun. She was right where you are now." Lerner, whose footage of the 1970 festival did not begin to see release until 1995, was able to capture Cohen's performance and the serene, somewhat mesmerized demeanor of the spectators. Kristofferson, Joan Baez and Judy Collins watched Cohen's set from the side of the stage and can be seen clapping and singing along to the song "Tonight Will Be Fine."

The performance of "Suzanne" was also used in the documentary film Message to Love by the same director.

== Reception ==
Thom Jurek of AllMusic states, "Whether it's 'So Long, Marianne,' the poem 'They Locked Up a Man,' the stellar reading of 'The Partisan,' or the chilling version of 'Famous Blue Raincoat,' this is top-notch Cohen."

== Track listing ==
=== The Songs (CD and 2LP) ===
No.	Title	Length
1.	"Introduction"	3:06
2.	"Bird on the Wire"	4:15
3.	"Intro To So Long, Marianne"	0:16
4.	"So Long, Marianne"	7:07
5.	"Intro: “Let’s Renew Ourselves Now...”"	0:51
6.	"You Know Who I Am"	3:58
7.	"Intro To Poems"	0:29
8.	"Lady Midnight"	3:38
9.	"They Locked Up A Man (Poem) / A Person Who Eats Meat / Intro"	2:00
10.	"One Of Us Cannot Be Wrong"	4:54
11.	"The Stranger Song"	6:37
12.	"Tonight Will Be Fine"	6:17
13.	"Hey, That’s No Way To Say Goodbye"	3:34
14.	"Diamonds In The Mine"	5:23
15.	"Suzanne"	4:18
16.	"Sing Another Song, Boys"	6:13
17.	"The Partisan"	4:47
18.	"Famous Blue Raincoat"	5:20
19.	"Seems So Long Ago, Nancy"	4:19

=== The Songs (DVD and Blu-ray) ===
1. "Intro: Diamonds In The Mine"
2. "Famous Blue Raincoat"
3. "It's A Large Nation"
4. "Bird On The Wire"
5. "One Of Us Cannot Be Wrong"
6. "The Stranger Song"
7. "Tonight Will Be Fine"
8. "They’ve Surrounded The Island"
9. "Hey, That's No Way To Say Goodbye"
10. "Sing Another Song Boys"
11. "Judy Collins Introduces Suzanne"
12. "Suzanne"
13. "Joan Baez On The Isle Of Wight"
14. "The Partisan"
15. "Seems So Long Ago, Nancy"
16. Credits: So Long, Marianne
17. Bonus Interviews: Bob Johnston, Judy Collins, Joan Baez, Kris Kristofferson.

== Musicians ==
- Leonard Cohen - vocals, guitar
- Bob Johnston – organ, piano, guitar
- Ron Cornelius – guitar
- Elkin "Bubba" Fowler – banjo, bass
- Charlie Daniels – fiddle
- Corlynn Hanney – vocals
- Susan Musmanno – vocals

=== DVD certifications ===
Region	Certification	Certified units/sales
Australia (ARIA)	Gold	7,500^{^}
^{^} Shipments figures based on certification alone.
