= Live at the Isle of Wight Festival 1970 (The Doors album) =

1987 album by The Doors

Live album by the Doors
- Released: February 23, 2018
- Recorded: August 30, 1970
- Venues: Isle of Wight Festival, East Afton Farm, England
- Genre: Rock
- Length: 70:00
- Label: Rhino
- Producer: Bruce Botnick

The Doors chronology
| London Fog 1966 (2016) | Live at the Isle of Wight Festival 1970 (2018) | Live in Bakersfield: August 21, 1970 (2023) |

Live at the Isle of Wight Festival 1970 is a live album by the American rock band the Doors, released on February 23, 2018, on Rhino Records. The concert was recorded at the Isle of Wight Festival in England on August 30, 1970, and this was released by Eagle Rock Entertainment. It was the group's final appearance as a foursome outside of the US and also the last full filming of a Doors concert.

The band's performances of "The End" and "When the Music's Over" are featured in Message to Love, a feature documentary film of the 1970 festival. A live version of "Break On Through (To the Other Side)" was featured in The Doors: Box Set, a 1997 box set about the Doors.

== Recording ==
A huge crowd descended on the Isle of Wight at the last of the three original festivals, in 1970; The Guinness Book of Records estimated the total attendance at between 600,000 and 700,000 people. The Doors hit the stage at two o'clock in the morning on August 30, 1970. Their set was particularly dark due to lead singer Jim Morrison's unwillingness of film spotlights to be used. Much of the recording sees the group bathed in a single red spotlight. Jerry Hopkins in his biography of the band, No One Here Gets Out Alive, commented on the cold wind and poor weather that hampered the performance.

Hanging over Morrison was his trial for lewd and lascivious behavior from a March 1, 1969, concert in Miami. Less than a month after this concert, on September 20, Morrison was convicted and sentenced to six months in jail, with hard labor, and fined $500. Morrison appealed but died in July 1971 before the matter was legally resolved.

Densmore said of Morrison, "He was like a pot of boiling water with a lid on top. He didn't move a lot, but he sang really strong." Manzarek said of the show, "Our set was subdued but very intense. We played with a controlled fury and Jim was in fine vocal form. He sang for all he was worth, but moved nary a muscle. Dionysus had been shackled."

== Releases ==
Live at the Isle of Wight Festival 1970 was released on February 23, 2018. The concert was remixed by long-time Doors engineer/co-producer Bruce Botnick in 5.1 Dolby Digital sound from the original multi-track audio tapes. The concert film of the band was also color-corrected and visually upgraded for release.

=== DVD/Blu-ray ===
Live at the Isle of Wight Festival 1970

Video by the Doors
- Released: February 23, 2018
- Recorded: August 30, 1970
- Venues: Isle of Wight Festival, East Afton Farm, England
- Genre: Rock
- Length: 84:00
- Label: Eagle Rock Entertainment
- Director: Murray Lerner
- Producer: Bruce Botnick

The Doors chronology
| Feast of Friends (2014) | Live at the Isle of Wight Festival 1970 (2018) |

The DVD/Blu-ray Disc of the concert includes This Is the End a 18-minute film containing interviews with Doors' guitarist Robby Krieger, drummer John Densmore, concert director Murray Lerner, and original Doors manager Bill Siddons. A 2002 interview recorded with Ray Manzarek, the Doors keyboardist who died in 2013, is also included.

== Track listing ==
=== CD and DVD/Blu-ray ===
| No. | Title | Writer(s) | Length |
|---|---|---|---|
| 1. | "Roadhouse Blues" | Morrison, The Doors | 5:45 |
| 2. | "Introduction" | | 1:00 |
| 3. | "Back Door Man" | Willie Dixon | 4:49 |
| 4. | "Break On Through (To the Other Side)" | The Doors | 5:15 |
| 5. | "When the Music's Over" | The Doors | 13:55 |
| 6. | "Ship of Fools" | Morrison, Krieger | 7:20 |
| 7. | "Light My Fire" | The Doors | 14:00 |
| 8. | "The End" (Medley: "Across The Sea" / "Away In India" / "Crossroads Blues" / "Wake Up") | The Doors | 17:56 |

DVD/Blu-ray bonus track
| No. | Title | Length |
|---|---|---|
| 9. | "This is the End" (Featurette) | 18:10 |

=== 2019 Record Store Day release ===
Side one
| No. | Title | Writer(s) | Length |
|---|---|---|---|
| 1. | "Introduction" | | 1:00 |
| 2. | "Back Door Man" | Willie Dixon | 4:49 |
| 3. | "Break On Through (To the Other Side)" | The Doors | 5:15 |
| 4. | "Ship of Fools" | Morrison, Krieger | 7:20 |

Side two
| No. | Title | Writer(s) | Length |
|---|---|---|---|
| 5. | "Roadhouse Blues" | Morrison, The Doors | 5:45 |
| 6. | "When the Music's Over" | The Doors | 13:55 |

Side three
| No. | Title | Writer(s) | Length |
|---|---|---|---|
| 7. | "Light My Fire" | The Doors | 14:00 |

Side four
| No. | Title | Writer(s) | Length |
|---|---|---|---|
| 8. | "The End" (Medley: "Across The Sea" / "Away In India" / "Crossroads Blues" / "Wake Up") | The Doors | 17:56 |

== Personnel ==
Per liner notes:

- Jim Morrison – vocals
- Ray Manzarek – keyboards, bass
- Robby Krieger – guitar
- John Densmore – drums

== Sources ==
- Hopkins, Jerry; Sugerman, Danny (1980). No One Here Gets Out Alive. ISBN 978-0-446-60228-0.
