= Nothing Is Easy: Live at the Isle of Wight 1970 =

2004 live album by Jethro Tull

Live album & DVD by Jethro Tull
- Released: 2 November 2004
- Recorded: 30 August 1970
- Genre: Progressive rock; hard rock; blues rock; folk rock
- Length: 59:31
- Label: Eagle
- Producer: Ian Anderson

Jethro Tull chronology
The Jethro Tull Christmas Album (2003)	Nothing Is Easy: Live at the Isle of Wight 1970 (2004)	Aqualung Live (2005)

Professional ratings
Review scores
Source	Rating
Allmusic	4/5 stars
The Encyclopedia of Popular Music	3/5 stars
Progressive World	5/5 stars

Nothing Is Easy: Live at the Isle of Wight 1970 is a live album by Jethro Tull, released on 2 November 2004. It was recorded on the fifth and last day of the Isle of Wight Festival 1970, where Jethro Tull were second on the bill between The Moody Blues and Jimi Hendrix.

== Track listing ==
No.	Title	Original album	Length
1.	"My Sunday Feeling"	This Was	5:22
2.	"My God" (with flute solo)	Aqualung	7:33
3.	"With You There to Help Me" (with piano solo (By kind permission of...))	Benefit	10:00
4.	"To Cry You a Song"	Benefit	5:42
5.	"Bourée" (instrumental)	Stand Up	4:36
6.	"Dharma for One" (with drum solo)	This Was	10:10
7.	"Nothing Is Easy"	Stand Up	5:38
8.	"We Used to Know / For a Thousand Mothers" (with guitar solo between both tracks)	Stand Up	10:37

== Personnel ==
Jethro Tull

- Ian Anderson – acoustic guitar, flute, vocals
- Glenn Cornick – bass
- Clive Bunker – drums
- Martin Barre – guitars
- John Evan – keyboards

== DVD ==
Nothing Is Easy: Live at the Isle of Wight 1970
- Directed by: Murray Lerner
- Produced by: Murray Lerner
- Edited by: Einar Westerlund; Pagan Harleman
- Release date: 2005
- Running time: 80 minutes
- Language: English

Like Living with the Past, this album is both a CD and a DVD. The DVD was released 22 March 2005, and contains many of same songs as the CD.

1. "Bourée" (from the soundcheck)
2. "My Sunday Feeling" – 4:52
3. "A Song for Jeffrey" – 2:44 (from The Rolling Stones Rock and Roll Circus in 1968)
4. "My God" – 9:47
5. "Dharma for One" – 14:51 (full-length version)
6. "Nothing Is Easy" – 5:48
7. "We Used to Know / For a Thousand Mothers" – 8:52 (with guitar solo between both tracks)

"With You There to Help Me" and "To Cry You a Song" have not been included, and the "We Used to Know / For a Thousand Mothers" medley has been shortened. Instead, it includes the complete full-length version of "Dharma for One" and "My God".

== See also ==
- Isle of Wight Festival 1970
- Living with the Past
- Message to Love
