= John Wilson (drummer) =

Musical artist (born 1947)

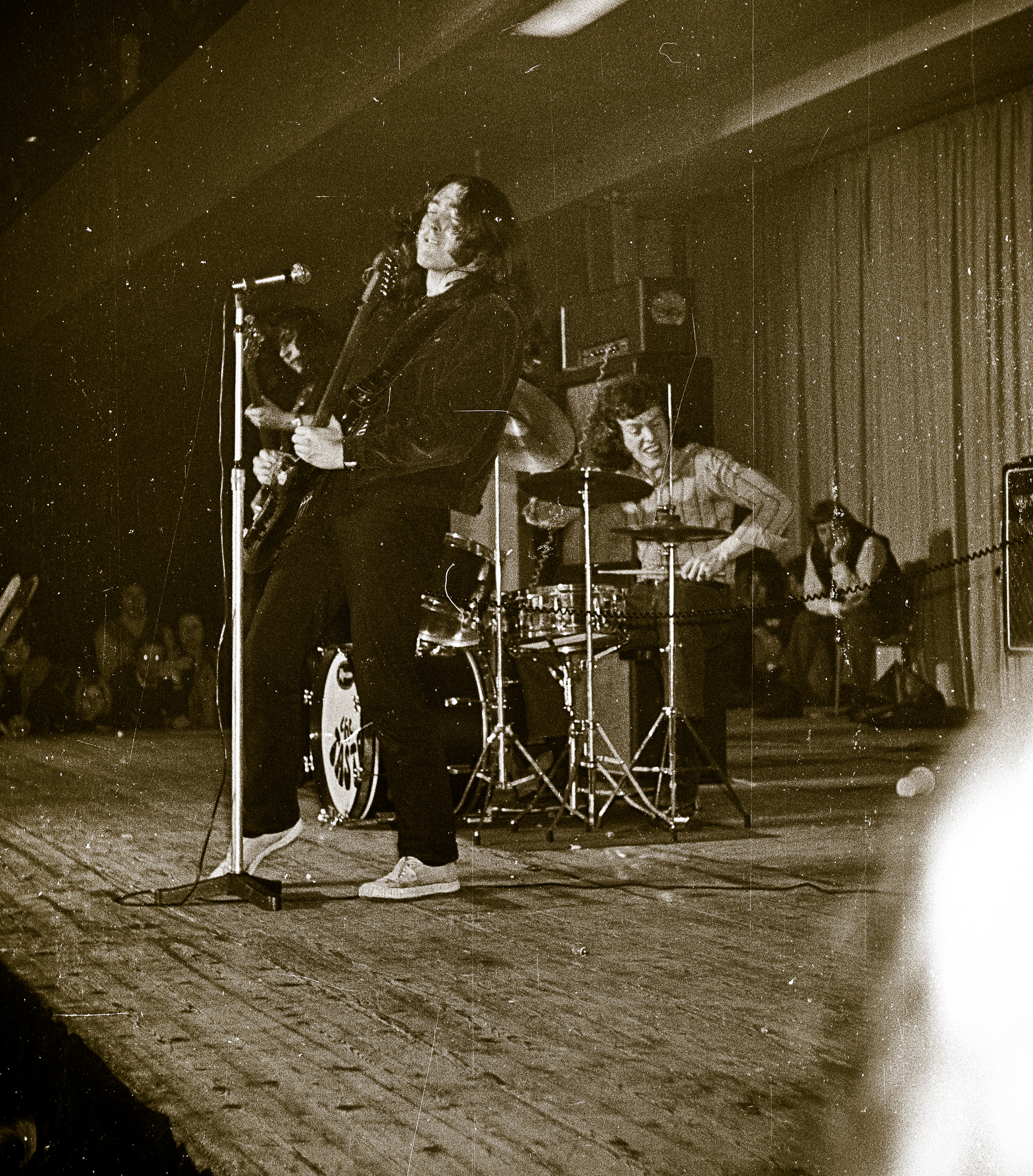
- Wilson (right on drums) performing with Taste in 1970.

Background information
- Born: 3 December 1947 (age 78); Belfast, Northern Ireland
- Genres: Blues rock; Garage rock
- Occupation: Drummer
- Years active: 1965–present
- Formerly of: Them; Taste; Stud

John Wilson (born 3 December 1947) is a Northern Irish musician. He has had a prolific career, playing drums with bands such as Them, Taste and Stud. Previously with 'The Misfits', Wilson became a member of one of the numerous line-ups of Them from September 1965 to March 1966. Alongside Van Morrison, Alan Henderson, Jim Armstrong and Ray Elliott, Wilson played on recording sessions for Them's second album Them Again (released January 1966). Visa restrictions meant that he had to be substituted by stand-in drummers for initial live dates abroad, due to his youth. He was replaced by Dave Harvey upon leaving Them, and went on to work with Belfast groups Derek & The Sounds and Cheese.

In January 1968, Wilson, along with Richard McCracken, had left the band and soon afterwards joined The Interns where they played along with Roy Abbott and Nicko Hallewell.

In May 1968, he and bass player Richard McCracken joined guitarist Rory Gallagher in Taste, after the band's previous line-up had disintegrated. The new Taste moved permanently to London where they signed with the record label Polydor. In November 1968, the band, along with Yes, opened for Cream at Cream's farewell concerts, and subsequently toured the United States and Canada with the supergroup Blind Faith. In April 1969, Taste released the first of their two studio albums, the self-titled Taste, with On the Boards following in early 1970, the latter showing the band's jazz influences. In 1970 they performed as part of the Isle of Wight Festival, alongside Jimi Hendrix and The Who. Later the same year Taste toured Europe but were disbanded by Gallagher, who decided to pursue a solo career, performing their last show on New Year's Eve in Belfast. Wilson and McCracken immediately formed 'Stud' in early 1971, with Jim Cregan and John Weider, both past and current members of Family respectively. They released the Stud album in 1971 and September in 1972, continuing the jazz-rock influence of On the Boards but failing to make a commercial impact. They split in 1972, though a live-in-the-studio album was released posthumously - Goodbye: Live at Command (1973). Wilson and McCracken had also contributed to Anno Domini's On This New Day album, recorded in 1970.

John Wilson then joined Brush Shiels in various incarnations of Skid Row, and planned a Them reunion in 1979 with ex-members Eric Wrixon and Billy Harrison, but dropped out before the Shut Your Mouth album was recorded. In 1993, Wrixon formed 'Them - The Belfast Blues Band' (often billed as 'Them') which included at various times John Wilson, Sam Davidson and Jim Armstrong. From February 2000, John Wilson led a reformed 'Taste', including Sam Davidson (guitar, vocals) and Albert Mills on bass. In 2010 they released the album Wall to Wall to critical acclaim. "Album of the year if not the decade" (Blues Matters! magazine).

Following the death of Rory Gallagher, he reformed Taste, hiring bassist Alan Niblock and guitarist Sam Davidson.

On 24 November 2017, Wilson and Taste played at the Everyman Palace Theatre. After battling throat cancer retired from playing .
