= Ollie Gilbert =

American folk musician

- Born: 1892
- Died: 1980 (aged 87–88)
- Other names: Auntie Ollie
- Occupation: folk musician
- Known for: singing more than 300 folk songs
- Notable work: Balladeer of Cole Younger

Ollie Gilbert (1892–1980) was a folk musician from the Ozarks in Arkansas. She sometimes performed as "Auntie Ollie". Max Hunter recorded her singing more than 300 folk songs.

She was from the Mountain View area.

In 1964, she and Jimmie Driftwood were interviewed by Studs Terkel. A recording of her performing "Willow Green" is on the album Songs of the Ozarks. An archival recording of her performing Balladeer of Cole Younger was presented on Danny Dozier's Ozark Highlands Radio show where she was introduced as a "prodigious Ozark folk balladeer".

One writeup described her voice as being like gravel.

She recorded Auntie Ollie Gilbert Sings Old Folksongs to Her Friends on Rackensack RLP. She recorded a version of Blue Suede Shoes in 1965. Gilbert was an influence on Shirley Collins who visited and recorded her on a trip with Alan Lomax. Her husband Oscar Gilbert played the fiddle, was also a singer, and was a moonshiner.
