= Festival (1967 film) =

1967 film by Murray Lerner

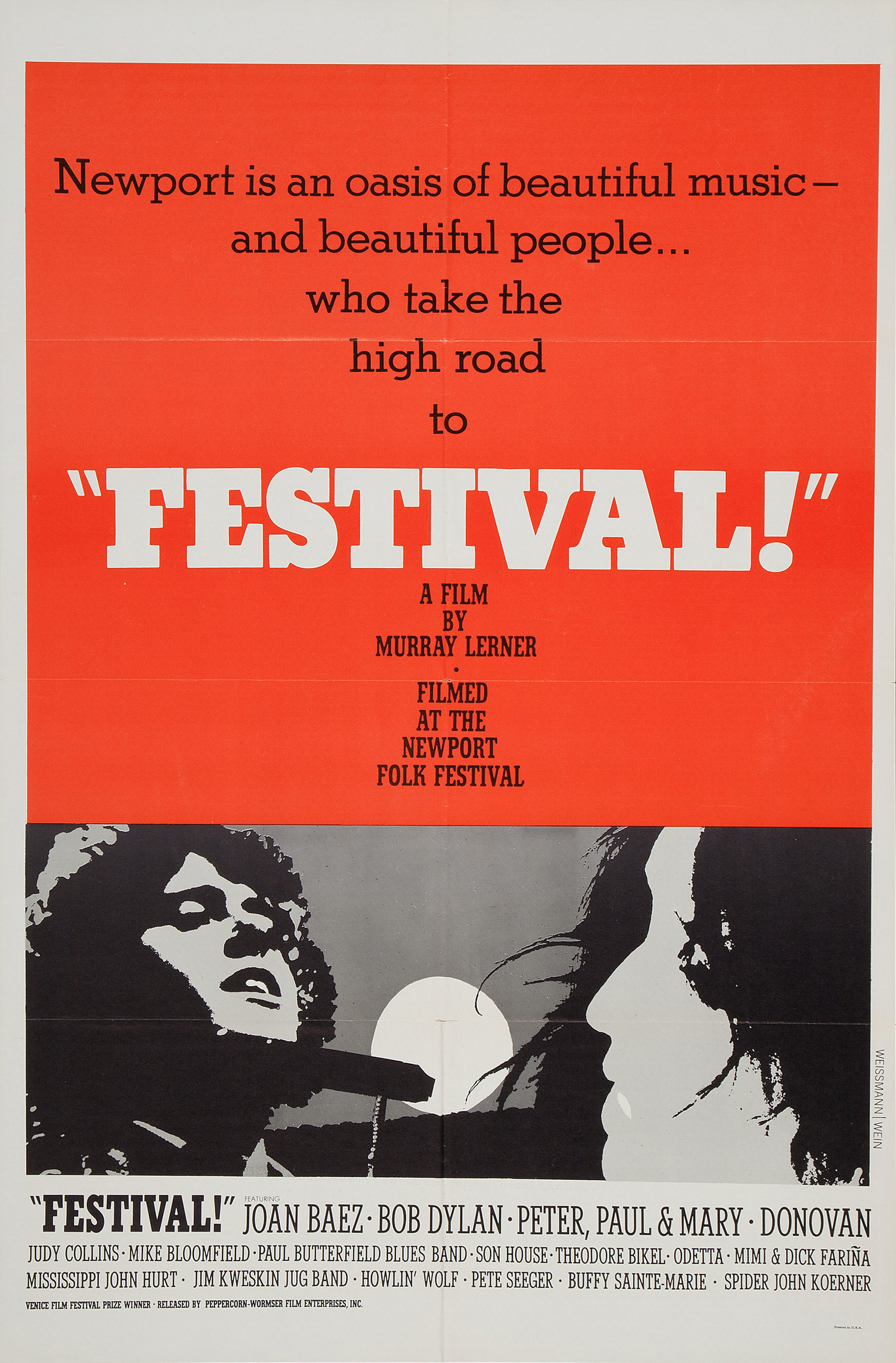
- Theatrical release poster with Donovan and Joan Baez
- Directed by: Murray Lerner
- Written by: Murray Lerner
- Produced by: Murray Lerner
- Starring: Joan Baez; Bob Dylan; Peter, Paul & Mary; Donovan; Judy Collins; Mike Bloomfield; Paul Butterfield Blues Band; Son House; Theodore Bikel; Odetta; Mimi and Dick Fariña; Mississippi John Hurt; Jim Kweskin Jug Band; Howlin' Wolf; Pete Seeger; Buffy Sainte-Marie; Spider John Koerner
- Cinematography: Murray Lerner; Stanley Meredith; Francis Grumman; George Pickow
- Edited by: Howard Alk
- Production company: Patchke Productions
- Distributed by: Peppercorn-Wormser
- Release date: December 5, 1967
- Running time: 97 minutes
- Country: United States
- Language: English

Festival (stylized as Festival!) is a 1967 American documentary film about the Newport Folk Festivals of the mid-1960s, and the burgeoning counterculture movement of the era, written, produced, and directed by Murray Lerner.

== Production ==
The movie was filmed over the course of four festivals at Newport (1963–1966), and includes footage of Bob Dylan’s controversial 1965 electric set.

== Reception ==
The Monthly Film Bulletin wrote: "The presentation of the music itself is desultory to say the least, consisting of several fragments by unidentified singers. ... The film does record at least one immensely important moment, when 'folk singer' Dylan appears on stage with a group for the very first time to put together a rock version of "Maggie's Farm". But sadly, this recognised turning point in American pop is treated with complete indifference by the film's makers, who don't even bother to show us the whole of Dylan's act or the significantly shocked audience response which greeted it."

Roger Ebert gave the film 3 1/2 out of four stars. His highest praise was for the editors, explaining, "They make their points quietly, with humor and understatement. The result is marvelously entertaining." He also gave credit to Lerner for making "full use of the strength of documentary film, the ability to catch unrehearsed moments that reveal personality."

== Accolades ==
Festival was nominated for an Academy Award for Best Documentary Feature in 1968.

== Musicians ==
The film features appearances by the following artists:

- Joan Baez
- Horton Barker
- Fiddler Beers
- Theodore Bikel
- Mike Bloomfield
- Blue Ridge Mountain Dancers
- Paul Butterfield Blues Band
- Johnny Cash
- Judy Collins
- Cousin Emmy
- Donovan
- Bob Dylan
- Mimi and Richard Fariña
- Freedom Singers
- Georgia Sea Island Singers
- Ronnie Gilbert
- Mrs. Ollie Gilbert
- Fannie Lou Hamer
- Son House
- Howlin' Wolf
- Mississippi John Hurt
- Spider John Koerner
- Jim Kweskin Jug Band
- Tex Logan and The Lilly Brothers
- Mel Lyman
- Spokes Mashiyane
- Mississippi Fred McDowell
- Clayton McMichen
- Moving Star Hall Singers
- Odetta
- Osborne Brothers
- Joe Patterson
- Peter, Paul & Mary
- Almeda Riddle
- Eck Robertson
- Sacred Harp Singers
- Buffy Sainte-Marie
- Mike Seeger
- Pete Seeger
- Hobart Smith
- The Staple Singers
- Swan Silvertones
- Mrs. General Watson
- Sonny Terry & Brownie McGhee
- Reverend Wilkins
- Young Fife and Drum Corps

== See also ==
- List of American films of 1967
- Monterey Pop, the 1968 filming of the Monterey Pop Festival
- Dont Look Back, the 1967 documentary film also featuring Bob Dylan
- Summer of Soul (2021)
- Gimme Shelter (1970), documenting The Rolling Stones and the Altamont Free Concert
