= Sugar Mama (song) =

Blues standard

"Sugar Mama Blues No. 1"

Single by Tampa Red
- Released: 1934
- Recorded: Chicago, May 12, 1934
- Genre: Blues
- Length: 3:26
- Label: Vocalion
- Songwriter(s): Unknown

"Sugar Mama" or "Sugar Mama Blues" is a blues standard. Called a "tautly powerful slow blues" by music journalist Charles Shaar Murray, it has been recorded by numerous artists, including early Chicago bluesmen Tampa Red, Sonny Boy Williamson I, and Tommy McClennan. John Lee Hooker and Howlin' Wolf later adapted "Sugar Mama" for electric blues and rock group Led Zeppelin reworked it during early recording sessions.

== Origins ==
Country bluesman Yank Rachell recorded "Sugar Farm Blues" on February 6, 1934. Sonny Boy Williamson I, with whom "Sugar Mama" is often associated, was an early collaborator of Rachell. "Themes that Yank Rachell recorded also turn up in the blues of [Sleepy John] Estes, [Sonny Boy] Williamson, and other artists from the [same] area, and it would be difficult to determine which artist actually created any particular theme".

== Tampa Red song ==
Tampa Red recorded two different versions of "Sugar Mama Blues" in 1934, shortly after Rachell's "Sugar Farm Blues". Both are medium tempo twelve-bar blues that featured Red's trademark slide resonator guitar work and vocals. "Sugar Mama No. 1", recorded May 12, 1934, features the lyrics often found in subsequent versions of the song:

Sugar mama sugar mama, please come back to me (2×)
Bring my granulated sugar, and ease my misery

"Sugar Mama Blues No. 2", recorded March 23, 1934, has some different lyrics (although recorded first, it was released later, hence "No. 2").

== Sonny Boy Williamson I song ==
John Lee "Sonny Boy" Williamson, sometimes identified as the composer of "Sugar Mama", first recorded the song three years after Tampa Red. The recording took place during his first session for Bluebird Records on May 5, 1937, that also produced "Good Morning, School Girl", which was used as the flip side for "Sugar Mama". Williamson's song uses most of the lyrics in Tamp Red's "Sugar Mama Blues No. 1" as well as the overall arrangement. However, his version features a harmonica solo with guitar accompaniment by Robert Lee McCoy, later known as Robert Nighthawk. Williamson later recorded several versions of "Sugar Mama Blues".

Both Tampa Red's and Williamson's "Sugar Mama Blues" were released before Billboard magazine or a similar service began tracking such releases, so it is difficult to gauge which version was more popular, although the song has been often identified with Williamson.

== Later renditions ==
"Sugar Mama Blues", usually called "Sugar Mama", has been recorded a by many blues and other musicians including Tommy McClennan as "New Sugar Mama", John Lee Hooker, and B.B. King. Hooker also used the song as basis for several of his own songs, such as "Sally Mae".

In 1964, Howlin' Wolf recorded the song as "My Country Sugar Mama". It was performed as a Chicago blues shuffle with lyrics from the Yank Rachell, Tampa Red, and Sonny Boy Williamson songs. The song was credited to Wolf as are many subsequent versions. Taste (1969 Taste), and Fleetwood Mac with Otis Spann (1969 Fleetwood Mac in Chicago/Blues Jam in Chicago, Vols. 1–2) have also recorded versions of the song.

== Led Zeppelin song ==
"Sugar Mama"

Song by Led Zeppelin

from the album Coda (Deluxe Edition)
- Released: July 31, 2015
- Recorded: October 1968
- Genre: Blues rock
- Length: 2:50
- Songwriter(s): Unknown
- Producer(s): Jimmy Page

Led Zeppelin recorded "Sugar Mama" (or "Sugar Mama (Mix)" as listed on the album release) during early recording sessions. The song is credited to Jimmy Page and Robert Plant, although biographer Nigel Williamson identifies it as "a cover of the Sonny Boy Williamson song".

Except for bootlegs, "Sugar Mama" remained unreleased until 2015, when it was included on the reissued version (deluxe and super deluxe) of the album Coda. "Sugar Mama" was recorded during the same session as "Baby Come On Home".
