= Taste (Irish band) =

Irish blues rock band

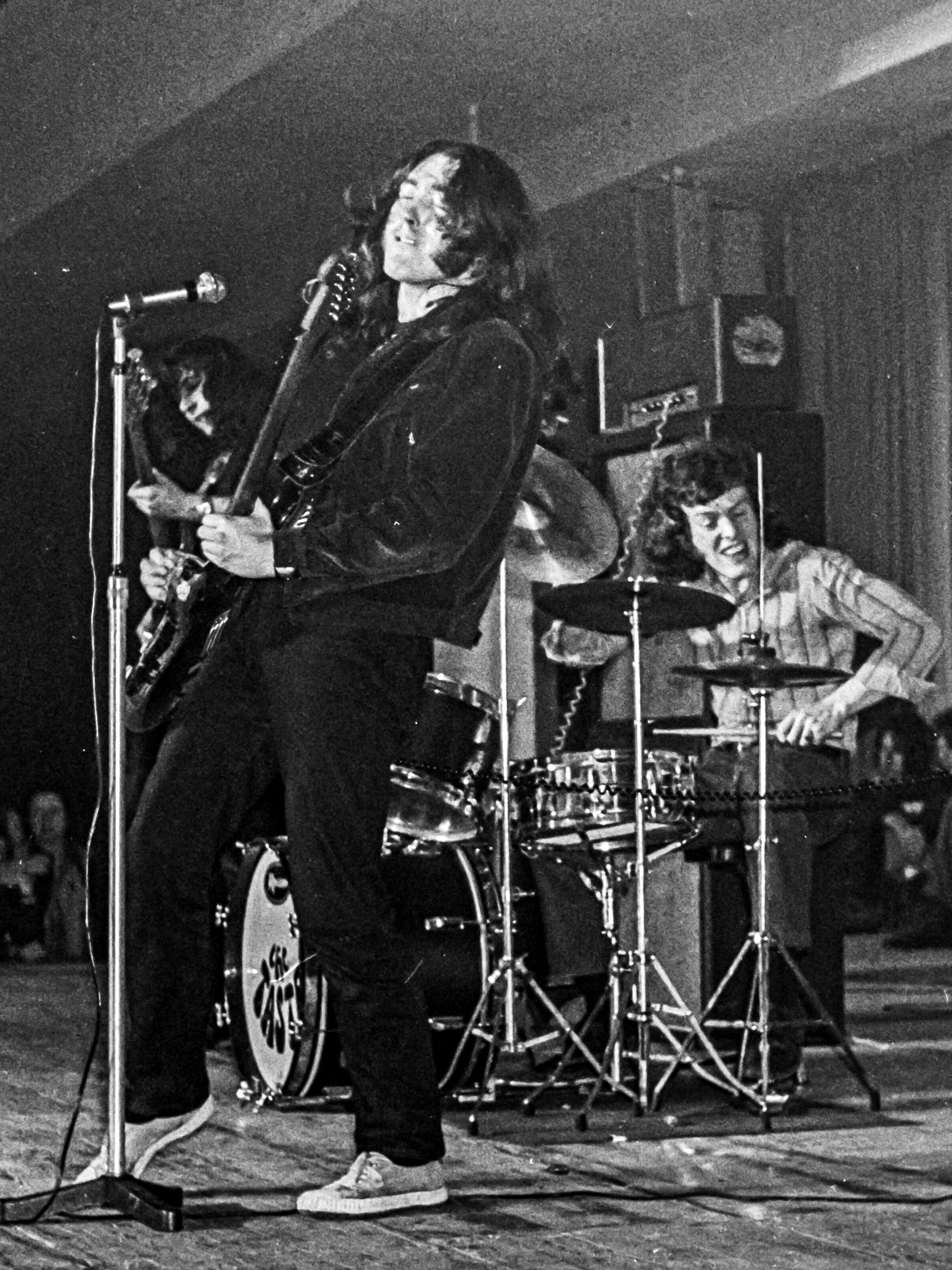
- Taste performing in 1970 in Germany. Left to right: Richard McCracken, Rory Gallagher, John Wilson

Background information
- Origin: Cork, Ireland
- Genres: Blues rock
- Years active: 1966–1970; 1996–present
- Labels: Verve, Polydor, Major Minor, Bad Reputation
- Members: Sam Davidson; Alan Niblock; Lyn McMullan
- Past members: Rory Gallagher; Norman Damery; Eric Kitteringham; Richard McCracken; Albert Mills; John Wilson

Taste are an Irish blues rock band that was founded by songwriter and guitarist Rory Gallagher in Cork in 1966. Gallagher left the band in 1970.

== History ==
Taste (originally "The Taste") were formed in Cork, Ireland, in August 1966 as a trio consisting of Rory Gallagher on guitars and vocals, Eric Kitteringham on bass, and Norman Damery on drums. They toured in Hamburg and Ireland before becoming regulars at Club Rado in the Maritime Hotel, an R&B club in Belfast, Northern Ireland, in the summer of 1967.

In 1968, the original lineup split up, and a new lineup formed with Richard McCracken on bass and John Wilson on drums. The new Taste moved permanently to London, where they signed with the record label Polydor. In November 1968, the band, along with Yes, opened at Cream's farewell concerts. While with Polydor, Taste began touring the United States and Canada with the English supergroup Blind Faith. In April 1969, Taste released the first of their two studio albums, the self-titled Taste, with On the Boards following in early 1970, the latter showing the band's jazz influences with Gallagher playing saxophone on two tracks.

They performed at the Isle of Wight Festival 1970, alongside Jimi Hendrix and The Who. According to Donal Gallagher (Rory's brother who managed the band) filmmaker Murray Lerner had instructed his crew to shoot just two numbers from the new bands and to save the main film stock for Jimi Hendrix, The Who, Leonard Cohen and the other headliners, but Taste's performance prompted him to change his instructions: "Murray didn't know who Taste were but when he saw the spontaneity of the band and the audience and their interaction, he just told his guys keep filming and they just kept going and captured over an hour of the performance which was quite incredible." In the song "Sugar Mama", a photographer can be seen hurriedly bringing his camera up from a re-load to cover another camera angle.

Later in 1970, Taste toured Europe, then disbanded for numerous reasons, the details of which are still unclear, but are generally acknowledged as being related to managerial disputes and tensions between Gallagher and the rest of the band, who wanted to be recognised as equals with him (Gallagher having been the sole songwriter in the band). They performed their last show on New Year's Eve in Belfast. Wilson and McCracken immediately formed 'Stud' in early 1971, with Jim Cregan and John Weider, while Gallagher went on to pursue a solo career. Some years after the break-up, recordings of the original line-up emerged.

A musical homage to Taste and Gallagher was made by Black 47 in their song "Rory", released on 1998's Green Suede Shoes album.

In 1996, Richard McCracken and John Wilson reformed the band with guitarist/vocalist Sam Davidson taking over Rory Gallagher's role as frontman, with Albert Mills replacing McCracken in 2010. The band continued in this formation until February 2017, when it was revealed that the band would tour under the name "Little Taste of Rory feat. John Wilson", and that the line-up now consisted of Wilson, Davidson, and new bassist Alan Niblock. In 2018 John Wilson retired from the band due to ill health but Sam Davidson continues to perform as "Sam Davidson's TASTE" with Albert Mills back on bass and Lyn McMullan taking over from Wilson on drums.

== Personnel ==
=== Members ===
Current members

- Sam Davidson – guitars, vocals (1996–present)
- Albert Mills – bass (2010–2017, 2018–present)
- Lyn McMullan – drums (2018–present)

Former members

- Rory Gallagher – guitars, vocals, saxophone, harmonica (1966–1970; died 1995)
- Norman Damery – drums (1966–1968; died 2023)
- Eric Kitteringham – bass (1966–1968; died 2013)
- John Wilson – drums (1968–1970, 1996–2018)
- Richard McCracken – bass (1968–1970, 1996–2010)
- Alan Niblock – bass (2017–2018)

Timeline

=== Line-ups ===
Years	Lineup
1966–1968	Rory Gallagher – guitars, vocals, saxophone, harmonica; Norman Damery – drums; Eric Kitteringham – bass
1968–1970	Rory Gallagher – guitars, vocals, saxophone, harmonica; Richard McCracken – bass; John Wilson – drums
1970–1996	Disbanded
1996–2010	Richard McCracken – bass; John Wilson – drums; Sam Davidson – guitars, vocals
2010–2017	John Wilson – drums; Sam Davidson – guitars, vocals; Albert Mills – bass
2017–2018	John Wilson – drums; Sam Davidson – guitars, vocals; Alan Niblock – bass
2018–present	Sam Davidson – guitar, vocals; Lyn McMullan – drums; Albert Mills – bass

== Discography ==
=== Studio albums ===
Title	Album details	Peak chart positions		
Title	Album details	GER	UK	US
Taste	Released: April 1969; Label: Polydor	—	—	133
On the Boards	Released: January 1970; Label: Polydor	33	18	—
Wall to Wall	Released: 2009; Label: Bad Reputation	—	—	—

=== Live albums ===
Title	Album details	Peak chart positions						
Title	Album details	AUS	BEL FL	BEL WA	FRA	GER	SPA	UK
Live Taste	Released: February 1971; Label: Polydor	35	—	—	—	38	—	14
Live at the Isle of Wight	Released: December 1971; Reissued: September 2015; Label: Polydor	—	191	88	181	37	91	41
In Concert	Released: December 1977; Label: Ariola	—	—	—	—	—	—	—

=== Compilation albums ===
Title	Album details	Peak chart positions		
Title	Album details	BEL FL	GER	NL
Pop History Vol. 9	Released: 1971; Label: Polydor	—	—	—
The Best of Taste	Released: 1994; Label: Polydor	—	—	—
I'll Remember	Released: 2015; Label: Polydor	118	39	38

=== Singles ===
- "Blister on the Moon" / "Born on the Wrong Side of Time" – UK, April 1968 ^{[a]}
- "Born on the Wrong Side of Time" / "Same Old Story" – UK/ EU/ JPN, 1969
- "What's Going On" / "Railway and Gun" – EU, 1970 ^{[b]}
- "If I Don't Sing I'll Cry" / "I'll Remember" – ESP, 1970
- "Wee Wee Baby" / "You've Got to Play" – GER 1972
- "Blister on the Moon" / "Sugar Mama" / "Catfish" / "On the Boards" – UK 1982

notes:

- a – re-released in 1970 with the sides reversed.
- b – b/w "Morning Sun" in some countries.

=== DVDs ===
- Message to Love – 1995 (Isle of Wight Festival recordings of "Sinner Boy" and "Gamblin' Blues" only)
- What's Going On: Live At The Isle Of Wight – 2015

== Bibliography ==
- The New Musical Express Book of Rock, 1975, Star Books, ISBN 0-352-30074-4
- McAvoy, Mark (2009). Cork Rock: From Rory Gallagher to the Sultans of Ping. Mercier Press ISBN 9781856356558
