= Charlie McCracken =

Northern Irish bassist (born 1948)

Richard 'Charlie' McCracken
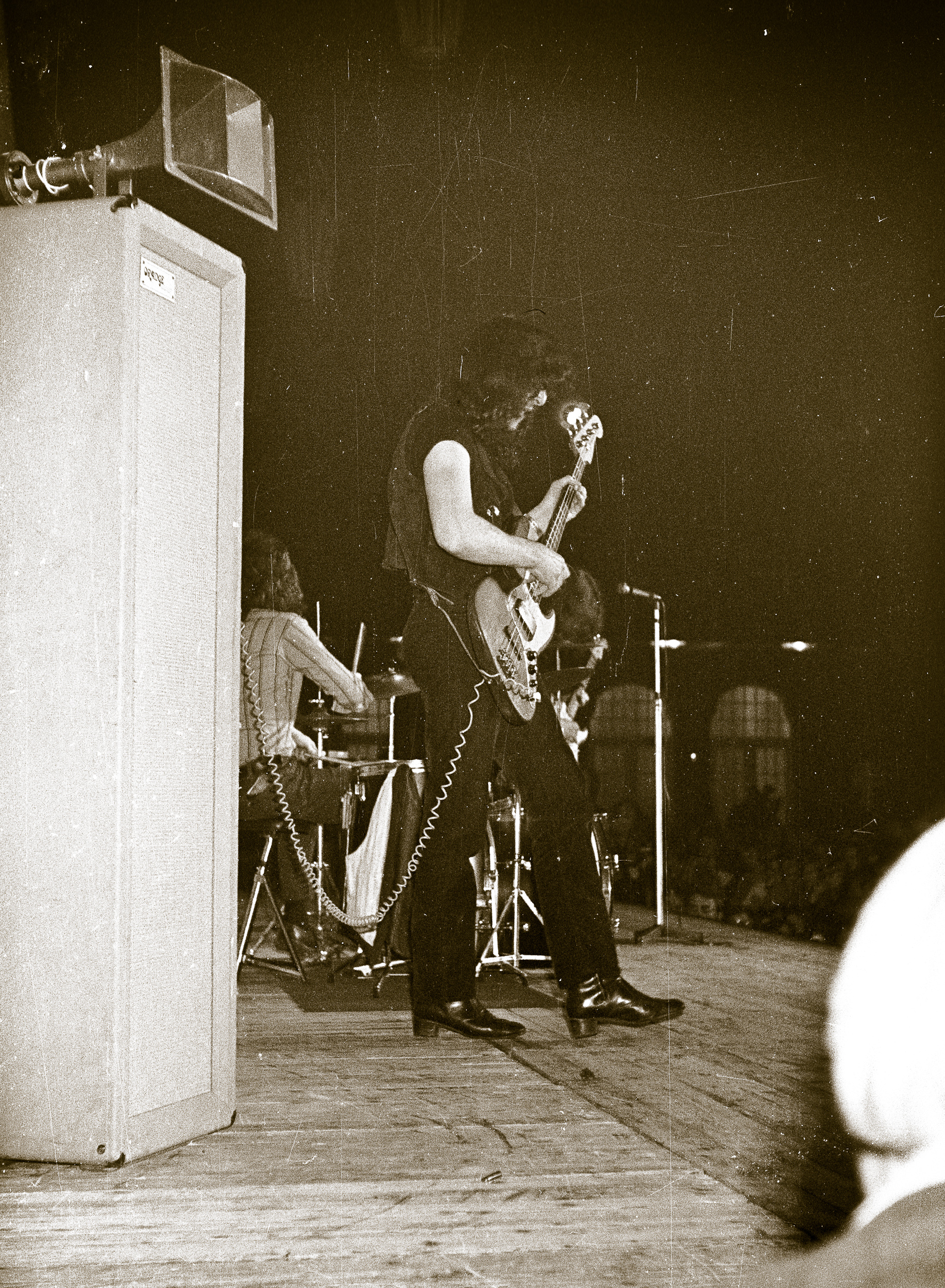
- McCracken performing with Taste in 1970

Background information
- Also known as: Charlie McCracken
- Born: Richard McCracken; 26 June 1948 (age 78); Omagh, County Tyrone, Northern Ireland
- Origin: Dublin, Ireland
- Genres: Blues rock; hard rock
- Occupation: Bassist
- Years active: 1968–2010
- Formerly of: Taste; The Spencer Davis Group; Stud; Axis Point; Fastway

Richard 'Charlie' McCracken, credited as both Richard and Charlie McCracken, (born 26 June 1948) is a Northern Irish bassist who was a member of Irish blues rock power trio Taste, featuring Rory Gallagher. He also played with The Spencer Davis Group and Fastway, and also was a session musician with Medicine Head, Kevin Ayers, Mike D'Abo and Francis Dunnery.

== Biography ==
McCracken joined Taste alongside drummer John Wilson, replacing original bassist Eric Kitteringham in 1968. With Taste, McCracken opened for Yes, Cream and Blind Faith and at the Isle of Wight Festival 1970, alongside Jimi Hendrix and The Who. In late 1970, they disbanded for numerous reasons, including bad management, differences with Gallagher and financial issues. They performed their last show on New Year's Eve in Belfast. Wilson and McCracken immediately formed 'Stud' in early 1971, with Jim Cregan and John Weider, both past/future members of Family, while Gallagher went on to pursue a solo career.

Stud disbanded in 1973, McCracken next joined a re-formed Spencer Davis Group with Spencer Davis, Ray Fenwick, Eddie Hardin and Pete York. The group released the albums Gluggo (1973) and Living in a Back Street (1974) before once again disbanding. McCracken contributed to an album called Hardin & York With Charlie McCracken, with former Spencer David bandmates Eddie Hardin and Pete York in 1974.

After four years, McCracken reappeared as bassist of Axis Point, with former members of Family, Spencer Davis Group and Judas Priest. The band existed between 1977 and 1979. McCracken resurfaced in 1983 as the first "Permanent" bassist of Fastway, a band founded by former Motorhead guitarist "Fast" Eddie Clarke, and former UFO bassist Pete Way, Way had departed shortly after the band formation. With Fastway, McCracken recorded All Fired Up in 1984 before departing alongside drummer Jerry Shirley after "Hardships of touring".

Following the death of Rory Gallagher, McCracken and Wilson reformed Taste in 1996 with new guitarist/vocalist Sam Davidson. McCracken retired from the band and music in 2010, he was replaced by Albert Mills.

== Discography ==
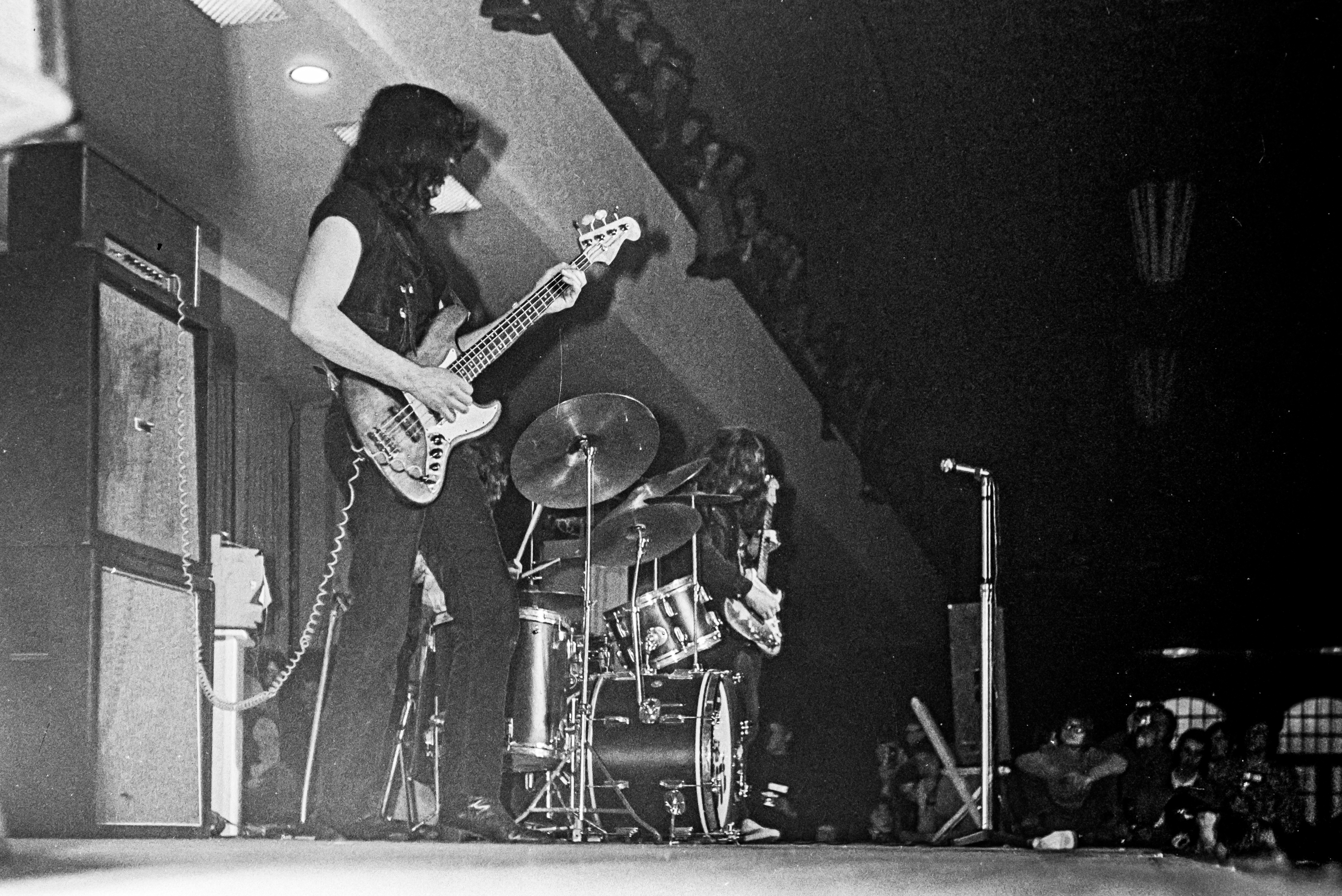
McCracken (left) with Taste in 1970

=== with The Spencer Davis Group ===
- Gluggo (1973)
- Living in a Back Street (1974)
- Catch You On The Rebop - Live In Europe 73 (1995)
- With Their New Face On (1997)
- Keep On Running (40th Anniversary) (2004)
- Taking Out Time (Complete Recordings 1967-1969) (2016)

=== with Axis Point ===
- Axis Point (1978)
- Boast of the Town (1980)

=== with Fastway/Eddie Clarke ===
- All Fired Up (1984)
- Trick or Treat (1986)
- Fastway / All Fired Up (2000)
- Anthology (2007)

Year	Artist	Title	Notes
1973	Kim Fowley	International Heroes	
1973	Roy Ayers Ubiquity	Red Black & Green	
1974	Hardin & York, Charlie McCracken	Hardin & York With Charlie McCracken	
1976	Kevin Ayers	Yes We Have No Mañanas (So Get Your Mañanas Today)	
1976	Medicine Head	Two Man Band	
1976	John Weider	John Weider	
1977	Rhead Brothers	Dedicate	
1977	Mickey Thomas	As Long As You Love Me	
1978	Kevin Ayers	Rainbow Takeaway	
1986	Tony Barton	Stoned	
1987	Mike D'Abo	Indestructible	
1996	Kevin Ayers	First Show In The Appearance Business (The BBC Sessions 1973–76)	
1998	Kevin Ayers	Too Old To Die Young	
2001	Francis Dunnery	Man	
2005	Pete York Percussion Band	Extension 345 Live!	
2007	JJ White	Featherhead	
2011	Kevin Ayers	Rainbow Takeaway / That's What You Get Babe	
