= Isle of Wight Festival 1970 =

UK music festival

Coordinates: 50.676°N 1.489°W

Festival poster, listing artists booked to play on the three main days

The Isle of Wight Festival 1970 was a music festival held between 26 and 30 August 1970 at Afton Down, an area on the western side of the Isle of Wight in England. It was the last of three consecutive music festivals to take place on the island between 1968 and 1970 and often acknowledged as the largest musical event of its time, with a larger attendance than Woodstock. Although estimates vary, Guinness World Records estimated 600,000 to 700,000 people attended. It was organised and promoted by local brothers, Ron and Ray Foulk through their company Fiery Creations Ltd and their brother Bill Foulk. John Homer was site manager and Rikki Farr acted as compere.

The preceding Isle of Wight Festivals, also promoted by the Foulks, had already gained a good reputation in 1968 and 1969 by featuring acts such as Jefferson Airplane, Tyrannosaurus Rex, the Move, the Pretty Things, Joe Cocker, the Moody Blues (performed at the 1969 festival), the Who, and Bob Dylan in his second performance since his 1966 motorcycle accident.

Many excerpts from this festival have appeared on record and video.

== Artists lineup ==
The 1970 version, following Woodstock in the previous year, set out to move one step forward and enlisted Jimi Hendrix. With Hendrix confirmed, artists such as the Who, Miles Davis, Joan Baez, Joni Mitchell, Jethro Tull, Sly and the Family Stone, Ten Years After, Emerson, Lake & Palmer, Free, Taste featuring Rory Gallagher, Tony Joe White, Cactus, Chicago, the Doors, Lighthouse, and the Moody Blues also took part. The event had a magnificent but impractical site, since the prevailing wind blew the sound sideways across the venue, and the sound system had to be augmented by Pink Floyd's PA. Organizers also faced the logistical problems involved in transporting some 600,000 people onto an island with a population of fewer than 100,000. The Island's transport services were already stretched by the annual influx of summer holiday-makers at the same time.

Political and logistical difficulties resulted in the organisers eventually realising that the festival would not make a profit and declaring it to be "a free festival", although the majority of the audience had paid for tickets in advance, and the event was filmed contemporaneously. The commercial failings of the festival ensured it was the last event of its kind on the Isle of Wight for thirty-two years.

== Planning difficulties ==
The opposition to the proposed 1970 festival from the residents of the Isle of Wight was much better coordinated than it had been in previous years. The Isle of Wight was a favoured retirement destination of the British well-heeled, and a haven of the yachting set, and many of the traditional residents deplored the huge influx of "hippies" and "freaks". This led to the introduction of sections to the "Isle of Wight County Council Act 1971" designed to control any further large overnight gatherings. Renting a few acres of suitable farmland to hold a music festival had in earlier years been a simple commercial matter between the promoters and one of the local farmers, but by 1970 this had become subject to approval decisions from several local council committees who were heavily lobbied by residents' associations opposing the festival. As a result of this public scrutiny, the preferred ideal location for the third Festival was blocked, and the promoters in the end had no choice but to accept the only venue on offer by the authorities: East Afton Farm, Afton Down. One unintended result of this choice of location was that, since it was overlooked by a large hill, a significant number of people were able to watch the proceedings for free.

== Performances ==
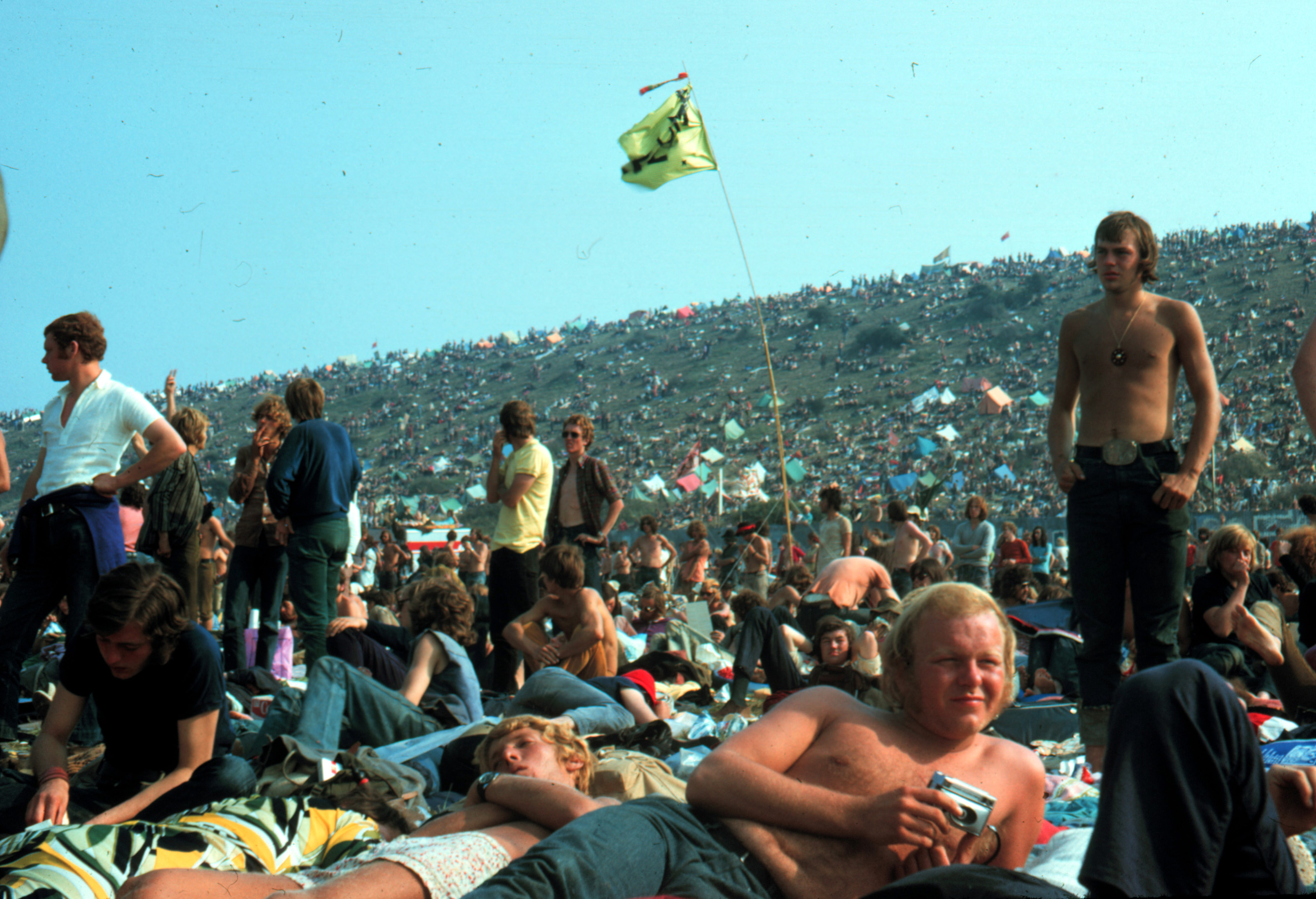
Image of the crowd, which Guinness World Records estimated at between 600,000 and 700,000 people

=== 26 Wednesday ===
- Judas Jump: A heavy progressive rock band featuring Andy Bown and Henry Spinetti of the Herd and Allan Jones of Amen Corner.
- Kathy Smith: A Californian singer-songwriter, signed to Richie Havens' label, "Stormy Forest", was well received.
- Rosalie Sorrels: Another folk musician, accompanied by David Bromberg on guitar.
- David Bromberg: Bromberg was not on the bill, but he performed a set. "Mr. Bojangles" was included on the album The First Great Rock Festivals of the Seventies.
- Kris Kristofferson: Performed a controversial set. Due to poor sound, the audience was unable to hear his set, and it appeared that they were jeering him. He was eventually booed off the stage because the audience could not properly hear his song "Blame It on the Stones" and ignorant members of the audience assumed he was criticising the Rolling Stones and the whole youth movement. "It was a total disaster," Kristofferson recalled. "They just hated us. They hated everything. They booed us, Joni Mitchell, Joan Baez, Sly Stone; they threw shit at Jimi Hendrix. At the end of the night, they were tearing down the outer walls, setting fire to the concessions, burning their tents, shouting obscenities. Peace and love it was not."
- Mighty Baby: psychedelic rock band.

=== 27 Thursday ===
- Gary Farr: The brother of festival promoter Rikki Farr, Gary had been the front man of the T-Bones, an R&B combo that featured Keith Emerson on keyboards. By this time, he had become a solo artist, and his second album, Strange Fruit, for CBS Records, had been released in 1970.
- Supertramp: Their eponymous debut album was released a month prior to the festival.
- Andy Roberts' Everyone
- Ray Owen: Ex-Juicy Lucy vocalist with his band
- Howl: Scottish hard-rock band formerly known as the Stoics, featuring Frankie Miller
- Black Widow: a British band that wrote songs about Satan worship in their 1970 debut LP, Sacrifice
- Groundhogs: English blues rockers
- Terry Reid: The English singer performed with David Lindley. The set was released on CD in 2004.
- Gilberto Gil and Caetano Veloso: Brazilian Tropicália musicians.
- Gracious!: A British progressive rock band.

=== 28 Friday ===
- Fairfield Parlour: They had recorded a single called "Let The World Wash In", released under the name I Luv Wight, which they hoped would become the festival's theme song. They had also previously recorded as Kaleidoscope.
- Arrival: Their set included a Leonard Cohen song.
- Lighthouse: This Canadian act performed two sets at the festival.
- Taste: Guitarist Rory Gallagher had a blues trio from 1966 to 1970. This was one of their final shows, which was filmed and recorded. An album, Live at the Isle of Wight, was released of their set in 1971. Their set is featured on the Taste: What's Going on – Live at the Isle of Wight 1970 DVD & Blu-ray released in 2016.
- Tony Joe White: Performed hits including "Polk Salad Annie"; his drummer was Cozy Powell. Tony Joe's entire set was released in 2006 on Swamp Music, a Rhino Handmade collection of his Monument recordings.
- Chicago: Their set included "25 or 6 to 4," "Beginnings" and "I'm a Man." Their entire set was released as part of the box set Chicago: VI Decades Live (This is What We Do) (2018) and separately on Chicago: Live at the Isle of Wight Festival (2018).
- Family: Their set included "The Weaver's Answer," which had become their signature song.
- Procol Harum: Frontman Gary Brooker commented that it was a cold night. "A Salty Dog" was included on The First Great Rock Festivals of the Seventies album.
- The Voices of East Harlem: An ensemble of singing school children from East Harlem in New York City. Their set received several standing ovations.
- Cactus: Two songs from their set were featured on the LP The First Great Rock Festivals of the Seventies.
- A showing of the Murray Lerner film Festival.

=== 29 Saturday ===
- John Sebastian: Performed an 80-minute set, during which former Lovin' Spoonful guitarist Zal Yanovsky made a surprise guest appearance.
- Shawn Phillips: This American folk musician performed an impromptu solo set following John Sebastian.
- Lighthouse (second set)
- Joni Mitchell: Played a controversial set; following her performance of "Woodstock", a hippie named Yogi Joe interrupted her set to make a speech about the people at the festival in an encampment built of straw bales known as Desolation Row. When Joe was hauled off by Joni's manager, the audience began to boo until Mitchell interrupted her own set to chastise the audience and make an emotional appeal to "give us [the artists] some respect". Contrary to popular belief, Joe was not the man who was ranting about a "psychedelic concentration camp". That was another incident that took place the previous day. After the crowd quieted down, Mitchell closed her set with "Both Sides Now" and returned to the stage for an encore singing two more songs for an appreciative crowd. Her set is featured on the DVD Joni Mitchell Both Sides Now: Live at the Isle of Wight Festival 1970, released in 2018.
- Tiny Tim: His rendition of "There'll Always Be an England" can be seen in the film Message to Love.
- Miles Davis: A DVD of his complete set was released in 2004. "Call It Anythin'" was included on The First Great Rock Festivals of the Seventies album.
- Ten Years After: British blues rockers performing what was basically a reprise of their famous Woodstock set. Highlights included "I'm Going Home" and "I Can't Keep From Crying Sometimes," which was featured on the album The First Great Rock Festivals of the Seventies and the film Message to Love.
- Emerson, Lake & Palmer: This was their second gig. Pictures at an Exhibition, which featured the Moog synthesizer, was the centerpiece of their historic set. Commercially released as Live at the Isle of Wight Festival 1970 in 1997.
- The Doors: Their set was shrouded in darkness due to Jim Morrison's unwillingness to have movie spotlights on the band. Their performances of "The End" and "When the Music's Over" are featured in Message to Love. As described in Morrison's biography, No One Here Gets Out Alive, wind, bad weather, and the cold made their performance even harder. Bootleg recordings of the performances and audio exist, alongside a 2015 remastered release by Doxy Records which has been made available on Spotify. A live version of "Break On Through (To the Other Side)" was featured in the soundtrack for When You're Strange. Their set is featured on the Doors: Live at the Isle of Wight Festival 1970 in a combo DVD/CD – Blu-ray/CD & DVD – Blu-ray released in 2018.
- The Who: Their entire set, including the rock opera Tommy, was released in 1996 on CD (Live at the Isle of Wight Festival 1970). Two years later their set appeared on DVD with significant cuts from Tommy and a few other songs (such as "Naked Eye") missing.
- Melanie: This Woodstock veteran played a well-received set as the sun rose. Prior to her set, Keith Moon of the Who offered her some moral support and encouragement. Not until afterwards did Melanie realize who he was. Her performance of her own song, "What Have They Done to My Song Ma", was included in a 2010 French documentary, spanning the 1970 and 2010 I.O.W. festivals, called From Wight to Wight and first shown on TV station ARTE, on 30 July 2010.
- Sly and the Family Stone: The showstoppers of Woodstock performed to a tired audience on the early morning of Sunday. However, the audience woke up for spirited renditions of "I Want to Take You Higher", "Dance to the Music" and "Thank You (Falettinme Be Mice Elf Agin)", which featured Sly on guitar. "Stand" and "You Can Make it if You Really Try" appeared on the album The First Great Rock Festivals of the Seventies. Prior to their encore, another political militant decided it was time to make a speech and the booing audience started to throw beer cans onto the stage. Freddie Stone was hit by a flying can and an angry Sly decided to skip the encore. He did promise a second appearance, but this never occurred.

=== 30 Sunday ===
- Good News: American acoustic duo with Larry Gold on cello and Michael Bacon on guitar.
- Kris Kristofferson (second set). For his second set he was warmly received. He came on with a bigger band and joked when he took the stage: 'Well, I'm back but this time I've brought some bodyguards'. Two of his songs from his sets were included on the album The First Great Rock Festivals of the Seventies.
- Ralph McTell: Despite an enthusiastic reception from the audience, he did not play an encore, and the stage was cleared for Donovan.
- Heaven: British jazz-influenced rock band, managed by Rikki Farr.
- Free: Their set list consisted of "Ride on a Pony", "Woman", "The Stealer", "Be My Friend", "Mr. Big", "Fire and Water", "I'm a Mover", "The Hunter", their classic hit "All Right Now", and concluded with a cover of Robert Johnson's "Crossroads" (a la Cream's arrangement).
- Donovan: He first performed an acoustic set, and then an electric set with his band Open Road.
- Pentangle: British folk band. A German woman interrupted their set to deliver a political message to the audience.
- The Moody Blues: A popular British act and veterans of the 1969 festival. Their rendition of "Nights in White Satin" can be seen in Message to Love. Their set is featured on Threshold of A Dream Live at the Isle of Wight 1970.
- Jethro Tull: Their set is featured on Nothing Is Easy: Live at the Isle of Wight 1970 which also shows clashes between the band's manager and the promoters.
- Jimi Hendrix: Performed in the early hours of 31 August with Mitch Mitchell on drums and Billy Cox on bass. Charlie Watkins of Watkins Electric Music, developer of the PA system being used, and Peter Watts, road manager for Pink Floyd, were to be mixing the sound and were anxious about it, so when David Gilmour, who was at the festival just as an attendee, went backstage, they co-opted him to help as he had some mixing experience. Throughout the set, radio interference occurred through the PA (during "Machine Gun" the security personnel's radio is clearly heard through Hendrix's amplifier). The set has been released on CD and video in various forms. "Power to Love", "Midnight Lightning" and "Foxy Lady" received top billing on the album The First Great Rock Festivals of the Seventies.
- Joan Baez: Her version of "Let It Be" can be seen in the film Message to Love.
- Leonard Cohen: Backed by his band the Army, his tune "Suzanne" can be seen in the film Message to Love. "Tonight Will Be Fine" were included on the album The First Great Rock Festivals of the Seventies. In October 2009, audio and video (both DVD and Blu-ray) recording of his set, Live at the Isle of Wight 1970 was released.
- Richie Havens: The musician who opened Woodstock closed this festival with a set during the morning of 31 August. As Havens performed his version of "Here Comes the Sun", a cloudy dawn broke after four days of cloudless sky, so he changed the lyrics to "Here Comes the Dawn". Havens' set, which is available as an audience recording, also included "Maggie's Farm" by Bob Dylan, "Freedom", "Minstrel from Gault" and the Hare Krishna mantra.

Canvas City performances
- Hawkwind (on Thursday)
- Pink Fairies (on Thursday)
- T2

On the bill, but did not perform:

- Cat Mother
- Spirit
- The Everly Brothers
- Redbone
- Mungo Jerry

== Films and albums ==
=== The First Great Rock Festivals of the Seventies (1971) ===
This three-LP set on CBS Records devoted the first disk to Second Annual Atlanta International Pop Festival, and two disks to the later Isle of Wight. Teo Macero is credited as the producer for the Isle of Wight disks. It featured in order billed: Jimi Hendrix, Sly and the Family Stone, Ten Years After, Miles Davis, Kris Kristofferson, Procol Harum, Cactus, Leonard Cohen and David Bromberg. The album went on to reach number 47 on the U.S. Billboard 200 album chart that same year.

=== Message to Love: The Isle of Wight Festival ===
All the performances at the festival were professionally filmed by award-winning film director Murray Lerner. with a view to releasing a documentary film but due to financial difficulties, nothing was released until 27 years after the event. Finally, Lerner distilled material from the festival into the film Message to Love: The Isle of Wight Festival which was premiered at a San Jose film festival in 1995 and released in 1997. A CD of the soundtrack was also issued by Castle Communications/Sony Legacy in 1997. The film puts a negative slant on the 1970 event by splicing in footage of violent incidents preceding the festival itself. Chief Constable, Hampshire Constabulary, Sir Douglas Osmond emphasised the peaceful nature of the event in his evidence given to the Stevenson Report, 1971 (submitted to parliament as evidence in favour of future Isle of Wight Festivals). By the end of the festival, the press representatives became almost desperate for material and they seemed a little disappointed that the patrons had been so well behaved.

=== Other films and albums ===
- "Let The World Wash In" by "I Luv Wight" was the festival official theme song that was soon replaced with "Amazing Grace" by "The Great Awakening"

A number of other performances were later released on various formats: VHS, LaserDisc, cassette tape, CD, DVD, Blu-ray & Vinyl records:

- The Who: Live at the Isle of Wight Festival 1970 (1996 – 2 CD) (2004 – 3 x Vinyl LP) Listening to You (1996)(1998)(2004) (1 LaserDisk/1 DVD/1 Blu-ray)
- Emerson, Lake & Palmer: Live at the Isle of Wight Festival 1970 (1997) (1 CD) The Birth of a Band: (2006) (1 DVD/ 2-Sided Disc: CD+DVD)
- Jimi Hendrix: Blue Wild Angel: Live at the Isle of Wight (2002) 3 x Vinyl LP, (2014) (2 CD/1 DVD/1 Blu-ray)
- Jimi Hendrix: (1990) "At the Isle of Wight" VHS, LaserDisc, CD (1971) "Isle of Wight" (1 x vinyl LP)
- Miles Davis: Miles Electric: A Different Kind of Blue (2004) (1 DVD) (2009) "Isle of Wight" CD n°39 from "The Complete Columbia Album Collection" boxset
- Miles Davis: (1987) "Isle of Wight" 1 x Vinyl LP, (2011) "Bitches Brew Live" 2 x Vinyl LP, (2007) "Isle of Wight concert" (Unofficial release) 1 x Vinyl LP)
- Jethro Tull: Nothing Is Easy: Live at the Isle of Wight 1970 (2005) (1 DVD/ 1CD/ 2 x Vinyl LP) (2002) "By a Benefit of Wight" (1 CD) Unofficial release
- Free: Free Forever (2006) (2 DVD) (Only Disc 2 is from the Isle of Wight Festival 1970)
- Free "Live at the Isle of Wight Festival 30/08/70" Fan club release 1 x CD 2 bonus track from the 1969 festival – (2019) "Live at the Isle of Wight 1970" (1 x CD 1 x Vinyl LP)
- The Moody Blues: Threshold of a Dream: Live at the Isle of Wight Festival 1970 (2009) (1 CD/1 DVD/1 Blu-ray) (2008) (1 x Vinyl LP)
- Leonard Cohen: Leonard Cohen: Live at the Isle of Wight 1970 (2009) (1 CD/1 DVD/1 Blu-ray 2 x Vinyl LP)
- Taste: What's Going on: Live at the Isle of Wight 1970 (2015) (1 CD/1 DVD/1 Blu-ray 2 x Vinyl LP) (1971) "Live at the Isle of Wight" 1 x Vinyl LP release on CD in 1992
- The Doors: Live at the Isle of Wight Festival 1970 (2018) (1 CD/1 DVD/ 1 Blu-ray, (2019) 2 x Vinyl LP Ltd edition of 11,000)
- The Doors Unofficial release: (1982) "Get Fat And Die" 1 x Vinyl LP, "First Flah of Eden" 1 x Vinyl LP, (2009) "When The Music's Over" 1 x Vinyl LP, (2011) "Last Screams of the Butterfly" 2 x Vinyl LP, (1997) "Palace of Exile" (1 x CD)
- Jim Morrison: "The Ultimate Collected Spoken Words 1967–1970" 2 x CD – CD 1 track 2 The Isle of Wight Festival Interview (in full) also available on vinyl LP (2020)
- Joni Mitchell: Both Sides Now. Live at the Isle of Wight Festival 1970 (2018) (1 DVD, 1 Blu-ray)
- Chicago: (2018) "Live at the Isle of Wight Festival" 2 x Vinyl LP, "Live Chicago" (VI Decades Live) 4 x CD + 1 x DVD boxset (CD 1&2 recorded at the Festival).
- Tony Joe White: (2006) "Swamp Music" 4 x CD Boxset Ltd edition to 5000 with 1 CD containing 7 songs recorded at the Festival.
- Terry Reid: (2004) "Silver White Light" Live at Isle of Wight 1970, 1 x CD
- Donovan unofficial release: (year unknown) "Diving For Pearls In The Sea" Volume2, 3 x CD set with booklet, Disc 1: With Open Road The Complete Isle of Wight August 30, 1970.
- Sly & the Family Stone: (2013) "Higher" 4 x CD set, CD 3, 4 tracks recorded live from the Isle of Wight, "I Want to Take You Higher" Numbered Ltd edition 1 x Vinyl LP.
- Coca-Cola Bullshit: (1970) 1 x Vinyl LP (unofficial), Side A: Kralingen (Rotterdam June 1970) Side B: Isle of Wight: 1 Melanie, Birthday of the Rain 2 Fairfield Parlour, Soldiers of Flesh (credited as: Taste, Soldiers of Flash) 3 Joan Baez, Joe Hill 4 Ten Years After, Sweet Sixteen 5 Joni Mitchell, Real Good For Free 6 Tiny Tim, Two Time a Day/Loveship
- Kralingen – Isle of Wight: 1 x Vinyl LP (unofficial), Side A: Kralingen (Rotterdam June 1970) Side B: Isle of Wight: 1 Jethro Tull, Bouree – 2 The Doors, Break on Through – 3 Richie Havens, I'm a Stranger Here – 4 Arrival, Not Right Now 5 Jimi Hendrix, God Save the Queen/Sgt Pepper's Lonely Hearts Club Band/Spanish Castle Magic
- Extremes: (2017) 1 CD + bonus DVD. Festival scenes: "Welcome to the Isle of Wight Music Festival" (10mn), "Naughty Naked People Celebrate Being Alive on the Beach " (5mn), "Meanwhile, Back at the Isle of Wight" (4mn), "Dancing in the Sea, Letting It All Hang Out" (9mn)

Other audience/soundboard recordings in different audio formats are circulating, among others are: Ten Years After, John Sebastian, Joan Baez, Richie Havens, Joni Mitchell, Procol Harum, Family, Kris Kristofferson, Pentangle ...

== Influence ==
The founders/main instigators of the Glastonbury (1971), Windsor (1972–74) and Stonehenge (1974–84) Free Festivals were all at IOW 1970, respectively Andrew Kerr, Ubi Dwyer and Wally Hope, inspired by the anarchistic nature of the breakdown of control by the original organisation and the subsequent freedom of the last days of the event.

For the 50th anniversary of the event, a re-enactment was scheduled in the same location, with John Lodge, Ten Years After, Pentangle, The Pretty Things and Nik Turner all confirmed. However, this was postponed due to the coronavirus pandemic.

In August 2026, the 1969 and 1970 festivals were the subject of BBC Radio 4's The Reunion, featuring in conversation Justin Hayward of The Moody Blues, Jacqui McShee of Pentangle, and Ian Anderson of Jethro Tull. Also in the programme were Melody Maker writer Richard Williams, island resident Terrii Telfer, and two of the Foulk brothers who organised the event.

== Publications ==
- The Last Great Event: with Jimi Hendrix & Jim Morrison, by Ray Foulk (Organiser) & Caroline Foulk, 364 pages, Medina Publishing 2016, Hardback ISBN 978-1-909339-58-3 & Paperback ISBN 978-1-909339-57-6
- Nights in Wight Satin: "An illustrated history of the Isle of Wight festivals" (1968,1969 & 1970) by Brian Hinton, 72 pages, 1990 – ISBN 0-906328-46-2
- Message To Love: "The Isle of Wight Festivals 1968 – 1969 – 1970", by Brian Hinton, 191 pages, 1995 – ISBN 1-86074-147-9
- The Last Great Event: "The 1970 Isle of Wight Festival" by Chris Weston, 152 pages, Ltd edition of 950 copies, Privately Published 2009 ISBN 0-9545233-3-4
- Six Days That Rocked The World: "Isle of Wight Festival 1970" by Bob Aylott, (40th anniversary 1970 – 2010), 144 pages, Ltd edition of 1000 copies, 2009 The Press Photographers Galery – My Best Seller Isle of Wight Festival 1970
- I Luv Wight: "The Isle of Wight Festival 1970", "The Band – The Theme Song – The Broken Dream" by Peter Daltrey, 119 pages, 2012 Chelsea Records Book Division
- Isle of Wight 1970: "The Last Great Festival" A picture record by Rod Allen, published September 1970 by Clipper Press, London.
- Festival de Wight: "Un Festival de Légende " by Bernard Rouan (photographer) Hardback photo book (400 copies) – 80 b/w full page photos, 96 pages, 2016 Édition des Galeries & Musées ISBN 979-10-93881-04-1
- Rocking the Isle of Wight: "How Three Totland Brothers Invented The British Rock Festival" By Alan Stroud and Tom Stroud. limited edition softback, 272 pages including 32 pages of unpublished colour photographs. 2020 Now and Then Books ISBN 978-1-8381740-0-2
- The Cameron Life Festival Experience: "1970 IoW Music Festival 40th Anniversary Exhibition Catalogue" A personal photographic account of the 1970 Isle of Wight Festival. Limited edition 1000 copies, 18 pages, 59 colour photographs by Charles Everest. Copyright © 2010 Cameronlife Link:
- Isle of Wight 1970: "The View From The Crowd" By Alan Stroud and Tom Stroud. Limited edition softback, 136 pages photo album containing over 120 large format colour photos. 2021 Now and Then Books ISBN 978-1-8381740-1-9
- Isle of Wight Festival 1969 - 1970: Café Royal Books 36 pages, 29 b/w photographs by David Hurn. © 2022 David Hurn & Café Royal Books - ISSN 2752-5619
