= Outline of the Doors =

Overview of and topical guide to the Doors

The Doors
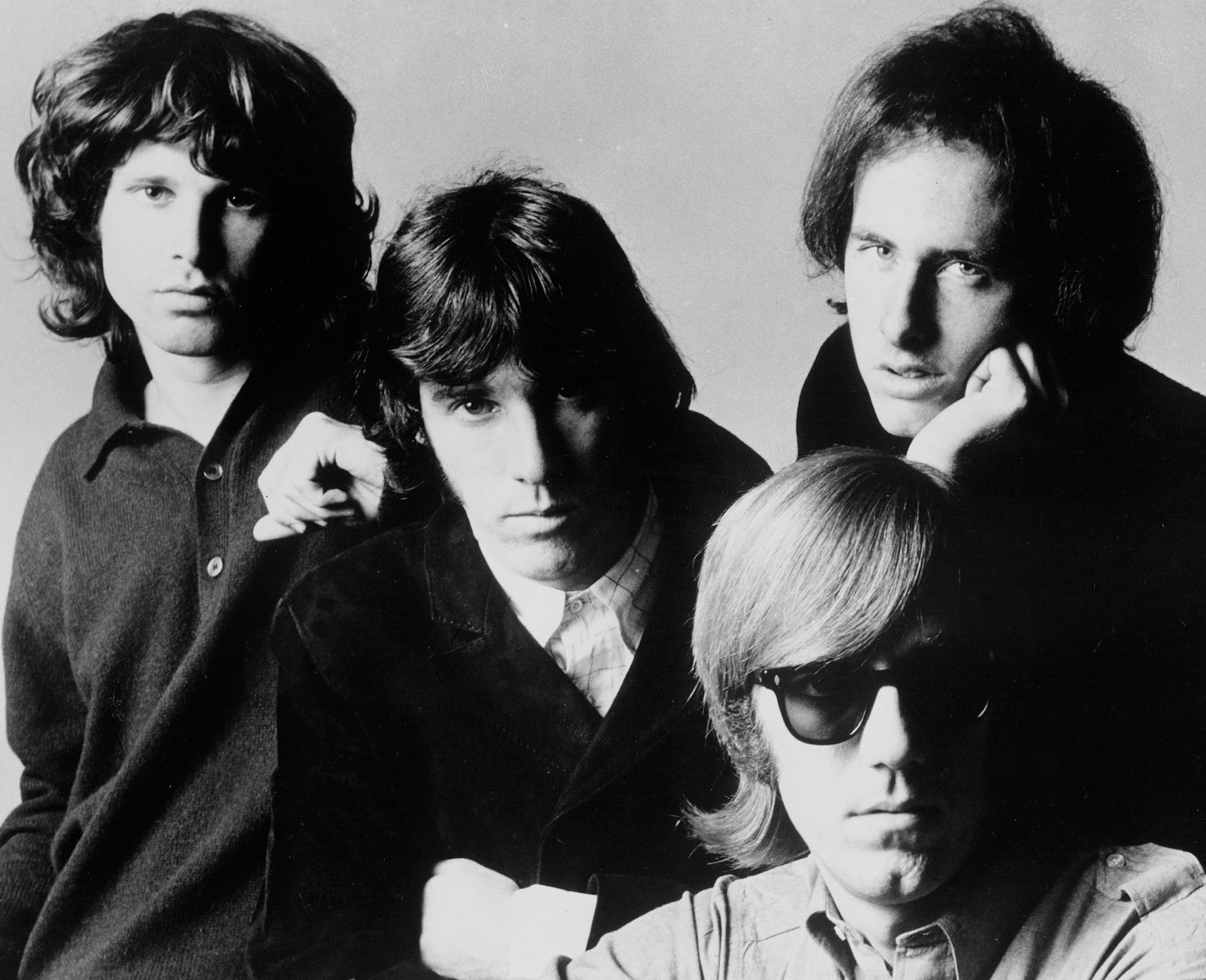
- The Doors in 1966. From left to right: Jim Morrison, John Densmore, Ray Manzarek and Robby Krieger

Background information
- Origin: Los Angeles, California, U.S.
- Genres: Psychedelic rock; blues rock; acid rock
- Works: Discography; songs
- Years active: 1965–1973 (Note: One-off reunions: 1978, 1993, 1997, 2000, 2012, 2013, 2025)
- Labels: Elektra; Rhino
- Spinoffs: The Psychedelic Rangers; Butts Band; Nite City; Manzarek–Krieger
- Spinoff of: Rick & the Ravens
- Past members: Jim Morrison †; Ray Manzarek †; Robby Krieger; John Densmore
- Website: thedoors.com
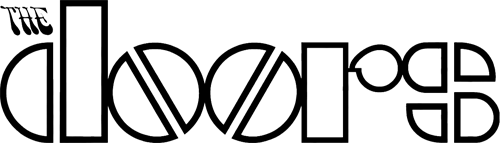

The following outline is provided as an overview of and topical guide to the Wikipedia articles available about The Doors. (Note: Outline does not include information about members solo careers.)

The Doors were an American rock band formed in Los Angeles in 1965, comprising vocalist Jim Morrison, keyboardist Ray Manzarek, guitarist Robby Krieger, and drummer John Densmore. They are considered one of the most innovative, influential, and eclectic rock bands in history, primarily due to their pioneering experimentation with a great variety of musical styles and techniques and Morrison's poetic lyrics and evocative voice. The group is widely cited as a major representative of the era's counterculture.

== Overview main articles ==
- The Doors
- John Densmore
- Robby Krieger
- Ray Manzarek
- Jim Morrison

== History ==
- Rick & the Ravens
- Roadhouse Blues Tour

=== Individuals associated with the Doors ===
- Paul A. Rothchild
- Bill Siddons
- Danny Sugerman
- Pamela Courson
- George Stephen Morrison

== Media ==
=== Studio albums ===
- An American Prayer
- The Doors
- Full Circle
- L.A. Woman
- Morrison Hotel
- Other Voices
- The Soft Parade
- Strange Days
- Waiting for the Sun

=== Compilation albums and sets ===
- 13
- The Best of The Doors
- The Best of The Doors
- The Best of The Doors
- Boot Yer Butt: The Doors Bootlegs
- The Bright Midnight Sampler
- A Collection
- The Complete Studio Recordings
- The Doors Classics
- The Doors
- The Doors: Box Set
- The Doors: Vinyl Box Set
- Essential Rarities
- The Future Starts Here: The Essential Doors Hits
- Greatest Hits
- Legacy: The Absolute Best
- No One Here Gets Out Alive
- Perception
- The Platinum Collection
- The Singles
- The Very Best of The Doors
- The Very Best of The Doors
- Weird Scenes Inside the Gold Mine
- When You're Strange: Music from the Motion Picture

=== Live albums ===
- Absolutely Live
- Alive, She Cried
- In Concert
- Live at the Hollywood Bowl
- Backstage and Dangerous: The Private Rehearsal
- Boot Yer Butt: The Doors Bootlegs
- The Bright Midnight Sampler
- Live at the Aquarius Theatre: The First Performance
- Live at the Aquarius Theatre: The Second Performance
- Live at the Hollywood Bowl
- Live at the Isle of Wight Festival 1970
- Live at the Matrix 1967
- Live in Boston
- Live in Detroit
- Live in Hollywood
- Live in Hollywood: Highlights from the Aquarius Theater Performances
- Live in New York
- Live in Philadelphia '70
- Live in Pittsburgh 1970
- Live in Vancouver 1970
- London Fog 1966
- No One Here Gets Out Alive

=== Songs ===
- Alabama Song
- Back Door Man
- Been Down So Long
- Break On Through (To the Other Side)
- Breakn' a Sweat
- Cars Hiss by My Window
- Celebration of the Lizard
- The Changeling (song)
- Crawling King Snake
- The Crystal Ship
- Easy Ride (Doors song)
- The End (The Doors song)
- End of the Night
- Five to One
- Get Up and Dance (The Doors song)
- The Ghost Song (Doors song)
- Gloria (Them song)
- Hello, I Love You
- Horse Latitudes (song)
- Hyacinth House
- I Looked At You
- In the Midnight Hour
- Indian Summer (The Doors song)
- L.A. Woman (song)
- Light My Fire
- Love Her Madly
- Love Me Two Times
- Love Street
- Maggie M'Gill
- Moonlight Drive
- The Mosquito (song)
- The Movie (song)
- My Eyes Have Seen You
- My Wild Love
- Not to Touch the Earth
- Peace Frog
- People Are Strange
- Queen of the Highway
- Riders on the Storm
- Roadhouse Blues
- Rock Is Dead (The Doors song)
- Runnin' Blue
- The Soft Parade (song)
- Soul Kitchen (song)
- Spanish Caravan
- The Spy (The Doors song)
- Strange Days (Doors song)
- Summer's Almost Gone
- Take It as It Comes (The Doors song)
- Tell All the People
- Tightrope Ride
- Touch Me (The Doors song)
- Treetrunk (song)
- Twentieth Century Fox (song)
- Unhappy Girl
- The Unknown Soldier (song)
- Waiting for the Sun (song)
- The WASP (Texas Radio and the Big Beat)
- When the Music's Over
- Whiskey, Mystics and Men
- Wild Child (Doors song)
- Wintertime Love
- Wishful Sinful
- Yes, the River Knows
- You Make Me Real
- You're Lost Little Girl

=== Visual media ===
- Feast of Friends
- R-Evolution (film)
- Soundstage Performances

== Legacy ==
=== Tributes ===
- Light My Fire: A Classic Rock Salute to The Doors
- Night Divides the Day: The Music of the Doors
- Stoned Immaculate: The Music of The Doors

=== Books ===
- No One Here Gets Out Alive

=== Films ===
- The Doors Are Open
- The Doors Collection
- The Doors (film)
- The Doors (soundtrack)
- When You're Strange
- When You're Strange: Music from the Motion Picture

== See also ==
- Outline of the Beatles

== Sources ==
- Debolt, Abbe A.; Baugess, James S. (December 2011). Encyclopedia of the Sixties: A Decade of Culture and Counterculture. ABC-CLIO. ISBN 978-0-313-32944-9.
- Einarson, John (2001). Desperados: The Roots of Country Rock. Cooper Square Press. ISBN 978-0-8154-1065-2.
- Wallace, Richard (18 September 2010). The Lazy Intellectual: Maximum Knowledge, Minimal Effort. Adams Media. ISBN 978-1-4405-0888-2.
