= The Complete Studio Recordings (The Doors album) =

Box set by the Doors
- Released: November 9, 1999
- Recorded: 1965–1977
- Genres: Psychedelic rock; acid rock; blues rock
- Length: 303:24
- Label: Elektra
- Producers: Paul A. Rothchild; Bruce Botnick; The Doors

The Doors chronology
Essential Rarities (1999)	The Complete Studio Recordings (1999)	Live in Detroit (2000)

Professional ratings
Review scores
Source	Rating
AllMusic	4/5 stars
The Encyclopedia of Popular Music	3/5 stars

The Complete Studio Recordings is a seven compact disc box set by American rock group the Doors, released by Elektra on November 9, 1999. It contains six of the original nine Doors albums, digitally remastered with 24 bit audio. The album includes previously unreleased tracks that had surfaced on The Doors: Box Set, on disc seven. The albums are placed in chronological order.

== Misleading title ==
While the title of the box set suggests this is a collection of all the studio recordings by the band, there are some notable exceptions. The set does not include the three post-Morrison albums Other Voices, Full Circle and An American Prayer, nor their respective singles. The non-album B-sides to "Get Up and Dance", the rare "Treetrunk", and to "Love Her Madly", "(You Need Meat) Don't Go No Further", a Willie Dixon song sung by Manzarek, are also missing.

== Track listing ==
All songs were written by Jim Morrison, Robby Krieger, Ray Manzarek, and John Densmore except where noted.

=== Disc one: The Doors ===
1. "Break On Through (To the Other Side)" (Jim Morrison) – 2:30
2. "Soul Kitchen" (Morrison) – 3:35
3. "The Crystal Ship" (Morrison) – 2:34
4. "Twentieth Century Fox" (Morrison) – 2:33
5. "Alabama Song (Whisky Bar)" (Bertolt Brecht, Kurt Weill) – 3:20
6. "Light My Fire" (Robby Krieger, Morrison) – 7:08
7. "Back Door Man" (Willie Dixon, Chester Burnett) – 3:34
8. "I Looked at You" (Morrison) – 2:22
9. "End of the Night" (Morrison) – 2:52
10. "Take It as It Comes" (Morrison) – 2:17
11. "The End" – 11:43

=== Disc two: Strange Days ===
1. "Strange Days" (Morrison) – 3:10
2. "You're Lost Little Girl" (Krieger) – 3:03
3. "Love Me Two Times" (Krieger) – 3:17
4. "Unhappy Girl" (Morrison) – 2:00
5. "Horse Latitudes" (Morrison) – 1:35
6. "Moonlight Drive" (Morrison) – 3:04
7. "People Are Strange" (Morrison, Krieger) – 2:12
8. "My Eyes Have Seen You" (Morrison) – 2:29
9. "I Can't See Your Face in My Mind" (Morrison) – 3:26
10. "When the Music's Over" – 11:00

=== Disc three: Waiting for the Sun ===
1. "Hello, I Love You" (Morrison) – 2:16
2. "Love Street" (Morrison) – 2:51
3. "Not to Touch the Earth" (Morrison) – 3:55
4. "Summer's Almost Gone" (Morrison) – 3:22
5. "Wintertime Love" (Morrison) – 1:54
6. "The Unknown Soldier" – 3:25
7. "Spanish Caravan" – 3:00
8. "My Wild Love" (Morrison) – 3:01
9. "We Could Be So Good Together" (Morrison) – 2:24
10. "Yes, The River Knows" (Krieger) – 2:36
11. "Five to One" (Morrison) – 4:24

=== Disc four: The Soft Parade ===
1. "Tell All the People" (Krieger) – 3:21
2. "Touch Me" (Krieger) – 3:12
3. "Shaman's Blues" (Morrison) – 4:48
4. "Do It" (Morrison, Krieger) – 3:08
5. "Easy Ride" (Morrison) – 2:41
6. "Wild Child" Morrison) – 2:38
7. "Runnin' Blue" (Krieger) – 2:30
8. "Wishful Sinful" (Krieger) – 3:00
9. "The Soft Parade" (Morrison) – 8:34

=== Disc five: Morrison Hotel ===
1. "Roadhouse Blues" (Morrison) – 4:04
2. "Waiting for the Sun" (Morrison) – 3:59
3. "You Make Me Real" (Morrison) – 2:53
4. "Peace Frog" (Morrison, Krieger) – 2:54
5. "Blue Sunday" (Morrison) – 2:13
6. "Ship of Fools" (Morrison, Krieger) – 3:08
7. "Land Ho!" (Morrison, Krieger) – 4:10
8. "The Spy" (Morrison) – 4:17
9. "Queen of the Highway" (Morrison, Krieger) – 2:47
10. "Indian Summer" (Morrison, Krieger) – 2:36
11. "Maggie M'Gill" (Morrison) – 4:23

=== Disc six: L.A. Woman ===
1. "The Changeling" (Morrison) – 4:21
2. "Love Her Madly" (Krieger) – 3:20
3. "Been Down So Long" (Morrison) – 4:41
4. "Cars Hiss by My Window" (Morrison) – 4:12
5. "L.A. Woman" (Morrison) – 7:55
6. "L'America" (Morrison) – 4:37
7. "Hyacinth House" (Ray Manzarek, Morrison) – 3:11
8. "Crawling King Snake" (Anon, arr. by John Lee Hooker) – 5:00
9. "The WASP (Texas Radio and the Big Beat)" (Morrison) – 4:16
10. "Riders on the Storm" – 7:09

=== Disc seven: Essential Rarities ===
1. "Hello to the Cities" (Live on The Ed Sullivan Show, 1967 and at Cobo Hall, Detroit, 1970) – 0:56
2. "Break On Through (To the Other Side)" (Morrison) (Recorded live at the Isle of Wight Festival, England, 1970) – 4:32
3. "Roadhouse Blues" (Morrison) (Recorded live at Madison Square Garden, New York City, 1970) – 4:19
4. "Hyacinth House" (Manzarek, Morrison) (Demo recorded at Krieger's home studio, 1969) – 2:40
5. "Who Scared You" (Recorded at Elektra Sound Recorders Studios, Los Angeles, 1969) – 3:16
6. "Whiskey, Mystics & Men" (Recorded at Elektra Sound Recorders Studios, Los Angeles, 1970, though it was actually recorded the previous year with overdubs put in by the surviving members in 1977) – 2:19
7. "I Will Never Be Untrue" (Morrison) (Recorded live at the Aquarius Theater, Hollywood, Los Angeles, 1969) – 3:56
8. "Moonlight Drive" (Morrison) (Demo recorded at World Pacific Studios, 1965) – 2:31
9. "Queen of the Highway" (Morrison, Krieger) (Alternate version recorded at Elektra Sound Recorders Studios, Los Angeles, 1969) – 3:32
10. "Someday Soon" (Recorded live at the Seattle Center, Seattle 1970) – 3:41
11. "Hello, I Love You" (Morrison) (Demo recorded at World Pacific Studios, 1965) – 2:28
12. "Orange County Suite" (Morrison) (Recorded at Elektra Sound Recorders Studios, Los Angeles, 1970) – 5:27
13. "The Soft Parade" (Morrison) (Recorded live on PBS Television, New York City, 1969) – 10:03
14. "The End" (Recorded live at Madison Square Garden, New York City, 1970) – 18:01
15. "Woman Is a Devil" (Morrison) (Bonus track - Recorded at Elektra Sound Recorders Studios, Los Angeles, 1969) – 4:08
