= The Very Best of The Doors (2007 album) =

The Very Best of the Doors

Greatest hits album by The Doors
- Released: September 25, 2007
- Recorded: 1966–1971
- Genres: Psychedelic rock; blues rock; acid rock
- Length: 78:53 (single disc version); 140:36 (double disc version)
- Labels: Elektra; Rhino
- Producers: Paul A. Rothchild; Bruce Botnick; the Doors

The Doors chronology
Live in Boston (2007)	The Very Best of the Doors (2007)	Live in Pittsburgh 1970 (2008)

The Very Best of the Doors is the ninth compilation album by the rock band the Doors. It was released on September 25, 2007, to commemorate the band's 40th anniversary. The masters were drawn from the same remixes/remasters used for the 2006 Perception box set and 2007 Doors reissues.

Three versions of the album were released – a single CD version (UK only) and two double-CD versions with minor differences (US and UK).

== Critical reception ==
Professional ratings
Review scores
Source	Rating
AllMusic	4.5/5 stars

Music writer Stephen Thomas Erlewine gave The Very Best of the Doors four and a half out of five stars in an album review for AllMusic. He outlines the differences between the similarly named releases and advises "if you're looking for an introduction or just the hits, take either of the 2001 or 2007 single discs; if you're looking for most of the best, pick the double-disc set, either with or without the DVDs."

== Track listings ==
All tracks are written by the Doors (John Densmore, Robby Krieger, Ray Manzarek, Jim Morrison), except where noted. Details are taken from the 2007 Elektra/Rhino double CD liner notes, except running times, which are taken from the AllMusic review. Other releases may show different information.

=== Single CD version ===
Released in the US as The Future Starts Here: The Essential Doors Hits (2008).

No.	Title	Original album	Length
1.	"Break On Through (To the Other Side)"	The Doors, 1967	2:28
2.	"Light My Fire"	The Doors	7:00
3.	"Love Me Two Times"	Strange Days, 1967	3:16
4.	"Hello, I Love You"	Waiting for the Sun, 1968	2:40
5.	"People Are Strange"	Strange Days	2:12
6.	"Strange Days"	Strange Days	3:09
7.	"Riders on the Storm"	L.A. Woman, 1971	7:08
8.	"L.A. Woman"	L.A. Woman	8:00
9.	"Touch Me" (Krieger)	The Soft Parade, 1969	3:13
10.	"Roadhouse Blues" (Morrison)	Morrison Hotel, 1970	4:07
11.	"Peace Frog" (Morrison, Krieger)	Morrison Hotel	2:58
12.	"Love Street"	Waiting for the Sun	2:57
13.	"The Crystal Ship"	The Doors	2:35
14.	"Soul Kitchen"	The Doors	3:33
15.	"Love Her Madly"	L.A. Woman	3:40
16.	"Back Door Man" (Willie Dixon, Chester Burnett)	The Doors	3:33
17.	"Alabama Song (Whisky Bar)" (Bertolt Brecht, Kurt Weill)	The Doors	3:17
18.	"Moonlight Drive"	Strange Days	3:04
19.	"The Unknown Soldier"	Waiting for the Sun	3:22
20.	"The End" (edited film version)	The Doors	6:28

=== Double CD version ===
Disc 1 (Both UK and US versions)
No.	Title	Writer(s)	Original album	Length
1.	"Break On Through (To the Other Side)"		The Doors	2:27
2.	"Strange Days"		Strange Days	3:09
3.	"Alabama Song (Whisky Bar)"	Brecht, Weill	The Doors	3:17
4.	"Love Me Two Times"		Strange Days	3:15
5.	"Light My Fire"		The Doors	7:00
6.	"Spanish Caravan" ([New Stereo Mix] Advanced Resolution)		Waiting for the Sun	3:02
7.	"The Crystal Ship"		The Doors	2:32
8.	"The Unknown Soldier"		Waiting for the Sun	3:26
9.	"The End" ([New Stereo Mix] Advanced Resolution)		The Doors	11:41
10.	"People Are Strange"		Strange Days	2:11
11.	"Back Door Man"	Dixon, Burnett	The Doors	3:34
12.	"Moonlight Drive"		Strange Days	3:05
13.	"End of the Night" ([New Stereo Mix] Advanced Resolution)		The Doors	2:50
14.	"Five to One" ([New Stereo Mix] Advanced Resolution)		Waiting for the Sun	4:33
15.	"When the Music's Over" ([New Stereo Mix] Advanced Resolution)		Strange Days	11:08

Disc 2 (U.S. version)
No.	Title	Writer(s)	Original album	Length
1.	"Twentieth Century Fox" ([New Stereo Mix] Advanced Resolution)		The Doors	2:32
2.	"Love Her Madly"		L.A. Woman	3:39
3.	"Riders on the Storm"		L.A. Woman	7:08
4.	"My Eyes Have Seen You" ([New Stereo Mix] Advanced Resolution)		Strange Days	2:31
5.	"Tell All the People" ([New Stereo Mix] Advanced Resolution)	Krieger	The Soft Parade	3:21
6.	"Hello, I Love You"		Waiting for the Sun	2:40
7.	"The WASP (Texas Radio and the Big Beat)" ([New Stereo Mix] Advanced Resolution)		L.A. Woman	4:16
8.	"Not to Touch the Earth" ([New Stereo Mix] Advanced Resolution)		Waiting for the Sun	4:00
9.	"Soul Kitchen"		The Doors	3:32
10.	"Peace Frog" (New Stereo Mix Advanced Resolution GH Edit)	Morrison, Krieger	Morrison Hotel	2:57
11.	"L.A. Woman"		L.A. Woman	7:59
12.	"Waiting for the Sun" ([New Stereo Mix] Advanced Resolution)	Morrison	Morrison Hotel	4:02
13.	"Touch Me" ([New Stereo Mix] Advanced Resolution)	Krieger	The Soft Parade	3:12
14.	"The Changeling"		L.A. Woman	4:24
15.	"Wishful Sinful" ([New Stereo Mix] Advanced Resolution)	Krieger	The Soft Parade	3:00
16.	"Love Street"		Waiting for the Sun	2:56
17.	"The Ghost Song"	Jim Morrison & the Doors	An American Prayer	4:12
18.	"Gloria" (2007 Remastered Live Version)	Van Morrison	Alive, She Cried, 1983	6:17
19.	"Roadhouse Blues"	Morrison	Morrison Hotel	4:08

Disc 2 (UK version)
No.	Title	Writer(s)	Original album	Length
1.	"Bird of Prey"	Morrison	An American Prayer	1:07
2.	"Love Her Madly"		L.A. Woman	3:40
3.	"Riders on the Storm"		L.A. Woman	7:09
4.	"Orange County Suite"	Morrison	The Doors: Box Set (1997)	5:46
5.	"Runnin' Blue"	Krieger	The Soft Parade	2:29
6.	"Hello, I Love You"		Waiting for the Sun	2:42
7.	"The WASP (Texas Radio and the Big Beat)"		L.A. Woman	4:15
8.	"Stoned Immaculate" (Morrison)		An American Prayer	1:37
9.	"Soul Kitchen"		The Doors	3:33
10.	"Peace Frog"	Morrison, Krieger	Morrison Hotel	2:58
11.	"L.A. Woman"		L.A. Woman	8:01
12.	"Waiting for the Sun"	Morrison	Morrison Hotel	4:03
13.	"Touch Me"	Krieger	The Soft Parade	3:14
14.	"The Changeling"		L.A. Woman	4:26
15.	"Wishful Sinful"	Krieger	The Soft Parade	3:00
16.	"Love Street"		Waiting for the Sun	2:57
17.	"The Ghost Song" (Morrison)		An American Prayer	4:14
18.	"Whiskey, Mystics and Men"		The Doors: Box Set	2:28
19.	"Roadhouse Blues"		Morrison Hotel	4:08

=== Bonus DVD ===
Walmart-exclusive double CD plus DVD set contains the UK track listing (even if bought in the U.S.). The DVD highlights performances from Live in Europe 1968.

DVD
No.	Title	Length
1.	"Light My Fire"
2.	"Hello, I Love You"
3.	"Spanish Caravan"
4.	"The Unknown Soldier"
5.	"The WASP (Texas Radio and the Big Beat)" / "Love Me Two Times"

== Personnel ==
- Jim Morrison – vocals
- Robby Krieger – guitar
- Ray Manzarek – piano, organ
- John Densmore – drums

== Certifications ==
Region	Certification	Certified units/sales
Australia (ARIA)	2× Platinum	140,000^{^}
Belgium (BRMA)	Gold	15,000^{*}
Ireland (IRMA)	Gold	7,500^{^}
Italy (FIMI)	Platinum	60,000^{*}
Poland (ZPAV)	Gold	10,000^{‡}
Portugal (AFP)	Gold	10,000^{^}
United Kingdom (BPI)	Platinum	300,000^{^}
United States (RIAA)	Gold	500,000^{^}
^{*} Sales figures based on certification alone.^{^} Shipments figures based on certification alone.^{‡} Sales+streaming figures based on certification alone.
