= The Best of The Doors (2000 album) =

Greatest hits album by the Doors
- Released: December 5, 2000
- Recorded: 1966–1977
- Genre: Rock
- Length: 73:53 (single disc version); 148:12 (double disc version)
- Labels: Elektra; WEA International
- Producers: The Doors; Bruce Botnick; Paul A. Rothchild

The Doors chronology
Live in Detroit (2000)	The Best of The Doors (2000)	Live at the Aquarius Theatre: The First Performance (2001)

The Best of The Doors is a compilation album by the Doors released in 2000, and is different from the albums of the same name released in 1973 and 1985. All three albums feature a slightly different track listing and a different photograph of the band's late singer Jim Morrison as cover art. Unlike its predecessors, the 2000 release includes both "Break On Through (To the Other Side)" and "The End" in their uncensored form.

Professional ratings
Review scores
Source	Rating
AllMusic	(2 Disc version)

== Track listing ==
All songs are written by the Doors (John Densmore, Robby Krieger, Ray Manzarek, and Jim Morrison), except where noted.

=== Original single disc version ===
No.	Title	Original album (year)	Length
1.	"Riders on the Storm"	L.A. Woman (1971)	7:15
2.	"Light My Fire"	The Doors (1967)	7:07
3.	"Love Me Two Times"	Strange Days (1967)	3:15
4.	"Roadhouse Blues (live)"	The Doors: Box Set & Essential Rarities (1997/1999); originally from Morrison Hotel (1970)	4:34
5.	"Strange Days"	Strange Days	3:08
6.	"Break On Through (To the Other Side)"	The Doors	2:28
7.	"Five to One"	Waiting for the Sun (1968)	4:26
8.	"Moonlight Drive"	Strange Days	3:02
9.	"Alabama Song (Whisky Bar)" (Bertolt Brecht, Kurt Weill)	The Doors	3:19
10.	"Love Her Madly"	L.A. Woman	3:19
11.	"People Are Strange"	Strange Days	2:11
12.	"Touch Me"	The Soft Parade (1969)	3:13
13.	"Back Door Man" (Willie Dixon, Chester Burnett)	The Doors	3:33
14.	"The Unknown Soldier"	Waiting for the Sun	3:22
15.	"L.A. Woman"	L.A. Woman	7:52
16.	"Hello, I Love You"	Waiting for the Sun	2:15
17.	"The End"	The Doors	11:44

==== Bonus disc ====
The album was also released as a limited edition digipak, which included the following bonus disc:

No.	Title	Length
1.	"Riders on the Storm" (Baez & Cornell Tunnel Club mix)
2.	"Riders on the Storm" (N.O.W. mix)
3.	"Riders on the Storm" (Ibizarre remix)
4.	"Riders on the Storm" (Spacebats remix)
5.	"Multimedia track" (Interview, gallery, E-card and more)

=== Double disc version ===
The double disc version of the compilation is notable for a remastered track from one of the two post-Morrison albums. The track "No Me Moleste Mosquito" appeared as "The Mosquito" on the 1972 album Full Circle. This was the second acknowledgement of the band's last two (and only post-Morrison) studio albums, since the appearance of "Tightrope Ride", taken from the album Other Voices (1971), on 1997's The Doors: Box Set.

==== Disc one ====
No.	Title	Original album	Length
1.	"Light My Fire"	The Doors	7:07
2.	"Hello, I Love You"	Waiting for the Sun	2:15
3.	"People Are Strange"	Strange Days	2:11
4.	"Love Me Two Times"	Strange Days	3:15
5.	"Touch Me"	The Soft Parade	3:13
6.	"Strange Days"	Strange Days	3:08
7.	"Spanish Caravan"	Waiting for the Sun	3:05
8.	"Moonlight Drive"	Strange Days	3:02
9.	"We Could Be So Good Together"	Waiting for the Sun	2:19
10.	"The Unknown Soldier"	Waiting for the Sun	3:22
11.	"Queen of the Highway"	Morrison Hotel	2:47
12.	"Shaman's Blues"	The Soft Parade	4:48
13.	"The WASP (Texas Radio and the Big Beat)"	L.A. Woman	4:15
14.	"L.A. Woman"	L.A. Woman	7:52
15.	"Whiskey, Mystics & Men"	The Doors: Box Set and Essential Rarities, 1997 & 1999/2000	2:20
16.	"Summer's Almost Gone"	Waiting for the Sun	3:22
17.	"You're Lost Little Girl"	Strange Days	3:02
18.	"When the Music's Over"	Strange Days	10:59
19.	"No Me Moleste Mosquito" (John Densmore, Ray Manzarek, Krieger)	Originally known as "The Mosquito" from Full Circle, 1972	5:15

==== Disc two ====
No.	Title	Original album	Length
1.	"Riders on the Storm"	L.A. Woman	7:15
2.	"Break On Through (To the Other Side)"	The Doors	2:28
3.	"Roadhouse Blues"	Morrison Hotel	4:02
4.	"Soul Kitchen"	The Doors	3:35
5.	"Love Her Madly"	L.A. Woman	3:19
6.	"Alabama Song (Whisky Bar)" (Brecht, Weill)	The Doors	3:19
7.	"Peace Frog"	Morrison Hotel	2:58
8.	"Waiting for the Sun"	Morrison Hotel; originally recorded for the album of the same name	3:59
9.	"Who Scared You"	B-side of the "Wishful Sinful" single, 1969	3:54
10.	"The Crystal Ship"	The Doors	2:33
11.	"Wishful Sinful"	The Soft Parade	3:00
12.	"Love Street"	Waiting for the Sun	2:52
13.	"Wintertime Love"	Waiting for the Sun	1:53
14.	"The Spy"	Morrison Hotel	4:18
15.	"Back Door Man" (Dixon, Burnett)	The Doors	3:34
16.	"My Eyes Have Seen You"	Strange Days	2:32
17.	"Five to One"	Waiting for the Sun	4:26
18.	"The End"	The Doors	11:44
19.	"The Famous Roadhouse Blues Footage!" (Multimedia track)

== Charts and certifications ==
=== Charts ===
Chart (2000)	Peak position
Australian Albums (ARIA)	50
Austrian Albums (Ö3 Austria)	19
German Albums (Offizielle Top 100)	50
New Zealand Albums (RMNZ)	43
Irish Albums (IRMA)	8
Italian Albums (FIMI)	49
Swiss Albums (Schweizer Hitparade)	17
UK Albums (Official Charts)	9
Chart (2001)	Peak position
Belgian Albums (Ultratop Flanders)	17
Swedish Albums (Sverigetopplistan)	11
Chart (2003)	Peak position
Belgian Albums (Ultratop Wallonia)	20
Chart (2005)	Peak position
Spanish Albums (Promusicae)	73

=== Certifications ===
Region	Certification	Certified units/sales
Argentina (CAPIF)	Platinum	60,000^{^}
Australia (ARIA)	6× Platinum	420,000^{^}
Austria (IFPI Austria)	Gold	25,000^{*}
Canada (Music Canada)	Platinum	100,000^{^}
Spain (Promusicae)	Gold	50,000^{^}
United Kingdom (BPI)	Platinum	300,000^{*}
^{*} Sales figures based on certification alone.^{^} Shipments figures based on certification alone.
