= Weird Scenes Inside the Gold Mine =

Compilation album by the Doors
- Released: January 1972
- Recorded: 1966–1971
- Genre: Rock
- Length: 99:02
- Label: Elektra
- Producers: Paul A. Rothchild; Bruce Botnick; the Doors

The Doors chronology
Other Voices (1971)	Weird Scenes Inside the Gold Mine (1972)	Full Circle (1972)

Weird Scenes Inside the Gold Mine is the second compilation album by American rock band the Doors (following 13) and the first following the death of singer Jim Morrison. A double album, it was released in January 1972.

The album contains zero overlapping songs from 13, instead opting for deeper cuts and fan favorites. Unlike 13, Weird Scenes has been reissued on compact disc, vinyl and streaming.

The album's title is a lyric from the song "The End." The cover was designed by Bill Hoffman, with a gatefold jacket containing band shots by Joel Brodsky and liner notes by Bruce Harris, national publicist for Elektra Records.

== Charts and reissue ==
Weird Scenes Inside the Gold Mine reached number 55 on the Billboard 200. In 1980, it was certified gold by the RIAA.

The album was reissued for the first time in over 40 years by Rhino Records as part of Record Store Day 2014. It was issued on April 19, 2014, on special amber colored vinyl, and was subsequently issued on CD for the first time on May 19, 2014.

Professional ratings
Review scores
Source	Rating
AllMusic	3/5 stars
Christgau's Record Guide	B−

== Track listing ==
All songs are written by the Doors (Jim Morrison, Ray Manzarek, Robby Krieger and John Densmore), except where noted. Details are taken from the 1972 Elektra Records album and may differ from other sources.

Side one
No.	Title	Original album	Length
1.	"Break On Through (To the Other Side)"	The Doors, 1967	2:25
2.	"Strange Days"	Strange Days, 1967	3:05
3.	"Shaman's Blues" (Morrison)	The Soft Parade, 1969	4:45
4.	"Love Street"	Waiting for the Sun, 1968	3:06
5.	"Peace Frog/Blue Sunday" (Morrison, Robby Krieger)	Morrison Hotel, 1970	5:00
6.	"The WASP (Texas Radio and the Big Beat)"	L.A. Woman, 1971	4:12
7.	"End of the Night"	The Doors	2:49

Side two
No.	Title	Original album	Length
1.	"Love Her Madly"	L.A. Woman	3:18
2.	"Spanish Caravan"	Waiting for the Sun	2:58
3.	"Ship of Fools" (Morrison, Krieger)	Morrison Hotel	3:06
4.	"The Spy" (Morrison)	Morrison Hotel	4:15
5.	"The End"	The Doors	11:35

Side three
No.	Title	Original album	Length
1.	"Take It as It Comes"	The Doors	2:13
2.	"Runnin' Blue" (Krieger)	The Soft Parade	2:27
3.	"L.A. Woman"	L.A. Woman	7:49
4.	"Five to One"	Waiting for the Sun	4:22
5.	"Who Scared You" (Morrison, Krieger)	"Wishful Sinful" single B-side, 1969	3:51
6.	"(You Need Meat) Don't Go No Further" (Willie Dixon)	"Love Her Madly" single B-side, 1971	3:37

Side four
No.	Title	Original album	Length
1.	"Riders on the Storm"	L.A. Woman	7:14
2.	"Maggie McGill" (Morrison, the Doors)	Morrison Hotel	4:25
3.	"Horse Latitudes"	Strange Days	1:30
4.	"When the Music's Over"	Strange Days	11:00
