= The Platinum Collection (The Doors album) =

Greatest hits album by the Doors
- Released: April 15, 2008
- Recorded: 1966–1971
- Genre: Rock
- Length: 48:45
- Label: Elektra; Rhino
- Producer: Paul A. Rothchild; Bruce Botnick; the Doors

The Doors chronology
The Future Starts Here: The Essential Doors Hits (2008)	The Platinum Collection (2008)	When You're Strange: Music from the Motion Picture (2010)

The Platinum Collection is a compilation album by the American rock band the Doors, released in 2008. It includes mostly songs that were not record chart hits for the group.

== Critical reception ==
Professional ratings
Review scores
Source	Rating
AllMusic	1.5/5 stars

James Christopher Monger, in a review for AllMusic, gave the album one and a half out of five stars. He wrote:

This weirdly uneven and basically unnecessary collection of random Doors songs from Warner Platinum has a few gems like "Love Street", "Moonlight Drive", "Soul Kitchen", and "Tell All the People", but its distinct lack of "hits" reduces it to useless in the humongous Doors anthology canon.

== Track listing ==
1. "Moonlight Drive"
2. "Soul Kitchen"
3. "Bird of Prey"
4. "Take It as It Comes"
5. "You're Lost Little Girl"
6. "My Eyes Have Seen You"
7. "The WASP (Texas Radio and the Big Beat)"
8. "Summer's Almost Gone" (40th anniversary mix)
9. "The Spy"
10. "Tell All the People"
11. "Queen of the Highway"
12. "Shaman's Blues"
13. "Hyacinth House"
14. "Cars Hiss by My Window"
15. "Love Street"

== Personnel ==
- Jim Morrison – vocals
- Robby Krieger – guitar
- Ray Manzarek – piano, organ
- John Densmore – drums
