= 13 (The Doors album) =

Compilation album by the Doors
- Released: November 30, 1970
- Recorded: 1966–1969
- Genre: Rock
- Length: 43:59
- Label: Elektra
- Producer: Paul A. Rothchild

The Doors chronology
Absolutely Live (1970)	13 (1970)	L.A. Woman (1971)

13 is the first compilation album by American rock band the Doors, released by Elektra Records on November 30, 1970. The title refers to the thirteen tracks included, which feature a variety of songs from their five studio albums released 1967 through 1970. It includes all six songs by the band that had reached the American Top 40 to this point, although not necessarily in their single release version. The cover shrink wrap featured a clear sticker that read: "A Collection of Thirteen Classic Doors Songs". It is the band's only compilation album released while lead singer Jim Morrison was alive.

The album reached No. 25 on the Billboard 200. It has been superseded by later Doors compilations, such as the highly successful The Best of the Doors (1985). While it has not been reissued on CD, it was reissued on vinyl in 2020 for its 50th anniversary.

== Background ==
13 was a project instigated by Elektra Records, who wanted product from the band for the Christmas season, to which the band reluctantly agreed. Morrison agreed to shave off his beard for the album cover's photo shoot, but the label opted for a younger photo of the singer, which they had also done for the group's live album Absolutely Live, released in July of that year. Author Danny Sugerman commented in his memoir of the band, No One Here Gets Out Alive, "Elektra obviously wanted the 'pretty' Jim Morrison." Morrison's image is also much larger than those of guitarist Robby Krieger, keyboardist Ray Manzarek, and drummer John Densmore, and Sugerman said that, "Although Ray, Robby, and John had become accustomed to the attention directed towards their lead singer, it upset Jim." The album's back cover features the band posing with a small bust of Ludwig van Beethoven (some have mistakenly claimed it is of occultist Aleister Crowley).

== Critical reception ==
Professional ratings
Review scores
Source	Rating
AllMusic	4/5 stars
Christgau's Record Guide	A−
MusicHound	3.5/5
The Rolling Stone Album Guide	3.5/5 stars

In a contemporary review in 1971, music critic Dave Marsh wrote that although the album does indeed contain "thirteen classic songs," it fails to deliver on any purpose other than compiling the most radio-friendly hits in one place. Marsh added that "no magnum opuses" were included in the collection. "No 'The End', no 'When the Music's Over', no 'Soft Parade' ... [it] would have been decidedly uncommercial to have them included here ... Of course 'Five to One' isn't here; funny thing, outside of 'Unknown Soldier' none of the Doors' more controversial subject matter is included."

Bruce Eder, in his retrospective review for Allmusic, likewise observed that 13 focuses strictly on the pop rock side of The Doors, and argued that the approach of marketing this side of the Doors separately from their more serious, adventurous, and coarse side was part of what made the band a success with such a range of listeners. Noting that 13 had continuously sold well for nearly two decades, whereas Doors compilations and live albums which freely mixed the band's two sides were much less popular, he saw 13 and the Doors' self-titled debut album as the two main gateways to their work, serving to draw interested listeners in and ultimately lead them to explore the Doors' deeper album cuts.

== Track listing ==
Details are taken from the 1970 U.S. Elektra album, which lists different songwriter credits than other Doors albums; other releases may show different information.

Side one
No.	Title	Writer(s)	Original album (year)	Length
1.	"Light My Fire"	Robby Krieger, Jim Morrison	The Doors (1967)	6:50
2.	"People Are Strange"	Morrison, Krieger	Strange Days (1967)	2:10
3.	"Back Door Man"	Willie Dixon, Chester Burnett	The Doors	3:30
4.	"Moonlight Drive"	Morrison	Strange Days	3:00
5.	"The Crystal Ship"	Morrison	The Doors	2:30
6.	"Roadhouse Blues"	Morrison, Doors	Morrison Hotel (1970)	4:04

Side two
No.	Title	Writer(s)	Original album	Length
1.	"Touch Me"	Krieger	The Soft Parade (1969)	3:15
2.	"Love Me Two Times"	Krieger	Strange Days	3:23
3.	"You're Lost Little Girl"	Krieger	Strange Days	3:01
4.	"Hello, I Love You"	Morrison	Waiting for the Sun (1968)	2:22
5.	"Land Ho"	Morrison, Krieger	Morrison Hotel	4:08
6.	"Wild Child"	Morrison	The Soft Parade	2:36
7.	"The Unknown Soldier"	Morrison, Doors	Waiting for the Sun	3:10

== Personnel ==
From the 1970 Elektra release:

The Doors

- Jim Morrison – vocals
- Ray Manzarek – piano, organ; keyboard bass ("Light My Fire" and "The Crystal Ship"), celesta ("Touch Me"), harpsichord ("Love Me Two Times")
- Robby Krieger – guitar, bass guitar ("Back Door Man")
- John Densmore – drums

Additional musicians

- Harvey Brooks – bass guitar ("Touch Me")
- Larry Knechtel – bass guitar ("Light My Fire")
- Doug Lubahn – bass guitar ("People Are Strange", "Moonlight Drive", "Love Me Two Times", "You're Lost Little Girl", "Wild Child")
- Lonnie Mack – bass guitar ("Roadhouse Blues")
- Kerry Magness – bass guitar ("The Unknown Soldier")
- John Sebastian (credited as "G. Puglese") – harmonica ("Roadhouse Blues")

Production

- Paul A. Rothchild – producer
- Jac Holzman – production supervisor
- Bruce Botnick – engineer

== Charts ==
Chart	Year	Position
Billboard 200	1971	25

== Certifications ==
Region	Certification	Certified units/sales
Canada (Music Canada)	Platinum	100,000^{^}
United States (RIAA)	Platinum	1,000,000^{^}
^{^} Shipments figures based on certification alone.
