= Essential Rarities =

Compilation album by the Doors
- Released: June 20, 1999
- Recorded: 1965–1977
- Genres: Psychedelic rock; blues rock; acid rock
- Length: 71:01
- Label: Elektra
- Producers: Bruce Botnick; The Doors; Paul A. Rothchild

The Doors chronology
The Doors: Box Set (1997)	Essential Rarities (1999)	The Complete Studio Recordings (1999)

Essential Rarities is a compilation album by the Doors, originally released as part of the boxed set The Complete Studio Recordings in 1999, but reissued in 2000 as a single CD, containing studio cuts, live cuts and demos taken from the 1997 The Doors: Box Set.

== Releases ==
Professional ratings
Review scores
Source	Rating
AllMusic	2.5/5 stars
The Encyclopedia of Popular Music	3/5 stars

All the tracks on the album had been officially released on the 1997 box set, with the exception of the bonus track "Woman Is a Devil," which was edited from the 1969 "Rock Is Dead" sessions from Elektra Records' Elektra Sound Recorders, and was not included in the box set version of the album. Some songs appear in more complete form than their Box Set versions: "Roadhouse Blues" has a 35-second section that was cut from the bridge of the song, and "Who Scared You" has an extra verse.

== Track listing ==
All songs written by the Doors (John Densmore, Robby Krieger, Ray Manzarek and Jim Morrison), except where noted.

No.	Title	Recording source	Length
1.	"Hello to the Cities"	Live on The Ed Sullivan Show, 1967 and at Cobo Hall, 1970	0:57
2.	"Break On Through (To the Other Side)" (Jim Morrison)	Live at the Isle of Wight Festival	4:44
3.	"Roadhouse Blues" (Morrison)	Live at Madison Square Garden, 1970	4:31
4.	"Hyacinth House (Demo)" (Ray Manzarek, Morrison)	Robby Krieger's home studio, 1969	2:38
5.	"Who Scared You"	B-side of "Wishful Sinful" single	3:55
6.	"Whiskey, Mystics and Men"	The Soft Parade outtake	2:23
7.	"I Will Never Be Untrue" (Morrison)	Live at Aquarius Theater, 1969	3:58
8.	"Moonlight Drive" (Morrison)	1965 demo	2:31
9.	"Queen of the Highway (Alternate version)" (Morrison, Krieger)	Morrison Hotel outtake	3:35
10.	"Someday Soon"	Live at Seattle Center, 1970	3:49
11.	"Hello, I Love You" (Morrison)	1965 demo	2:31
12.	"Orange County Suite" (Morrison)	L.A. Woman outtake	5:44
13.	"The Soft Parade" (Morrison)	Live on PBS Television, 1969	10:09
14.	"The End"	Live at Madison Square Garden, 1970	17:46
15.	"Woman Is a Devil" (Robert Johnson)	The Soft Parade outtake	4:10

== Personnel ==
The Doors

- Jim Morrison – vocals, piano on "Orange County Suite"
- Robby Krieger – guitar
- Ray Manzarek – organ, piano, keyboard bass, backing vocals
- John Densmore – drums, percussion, backing vocals

Technical

- Paul A. Rothchild – original producer
- Bruce Botnick – producer
- Danny Sugerman – management
- Richard Evans – art direction and design
- Todd Gray – photo archivist
