= The Future Starts Here: The Essential Doors Hits =

Greatest hits album by the Doors
- Released: January 29, 2008
- Recorded: 1966–1971
- Genre: Rock
- Length: 78:53
- Label: Elektra; Rhino
- Producer: Paul A. Rothchild; Bruce Botnick; the Doors

The Doors chronology
The Very Best of The Doors (2007)	The Future Starts Here: The Essential Doors Hits (2008)	The Platinum Collection (2008)

The Future Starts Here: The Essential Doors Hits is a compilation album by the rock band the Doors. It was released in the U.S. in 2008 to commemorate the band's 40th anniversary and contains new stereo audio mixes of the songs.

== Critical reception ==
Professional ratings
Review scores
Source	Rating
AllMusic	4.5/5 stars

In a review for AllMusic, critic Steve Leggett ranked the album at four and a half out of five stars. He described the album as a "concise set [that] hits all the absolute essentials, and each of these 20 tracks is a classic, from the early mission statement 'Break on Through (To the Other Side)' to the unambiguous stomp of 'L.A. Woman'."

== Track listing ==
All tracks are written by the Doors (John Densmore, Robby Krieger, Ray Manzarek, Jim Morrison), except where noted. Other releases may show different information.

No.	Title	Original album	Length
1.	"Break On Through (To the Other Side)"	The Doors, 1967	2:27
2.	"Light My Fire"	The Doors	6:59
3.	"Love Me Two Times"	Strange Days, 1967	3:16
4.	"Hello, I Love You"	Waiting for the Sun, 1968	2:41
5.	"People Are Strange"	Strange Days	2:12
6.	"Strange Days"	Strange Days	3:09
7.	"Riders on the Storm"	L.A. Woman, 1971	7:09
8.	"L.A. Woman"	L.A. Woman	8:00
9.	"Touch Me" (Krieger)	The Soft Parade, 1969	3:12
10.	"Roadhouse Blues" (Morrison)	Morrison Hotel, 1970	4:08
11.	"Peace Frog" (Morrison/Krieger)	Morrison Hotel	2:58
12.	"Love Street"	Waiting for the Sun	2:57
13.	"The Crystal Ship"	The Doors	2:35
14.	"Soul Kitchen"	The Doors	3:33
15.	"Love Her Madly"	L.A. Woman	3:40
16.	"Back Door Man" (Chester Burnett, Willie Dixon)	The Doors	3:33
17.	"Alabama Song (Whisky Bar)" (Bertolt Brecht, Kurt Weill)	The Doors	3:17
18.	"Moonlight Drive"	Strange Days	3:05
19.	"The Unknown Soldier"	Waiting for the Sun	3:26
20.	"The End" (edited film version from Apocalypse Now)		6:28

== Personnel ==
Per album liner notes:

- Jim Morrison – vocals, production
- Robby Krieger – guitar, production
- Ray Manzarek – piano, organ, production
- John Densmore – drums, production
- Bruce Botnick – production, remastering
- Paul A. Rothchild – production

== Certifications ==
Region	Certification	Certified units/sales
United States (RIAA)	Gold	500,000^{^}
^{^} Shipments figures based on certification alone.
