= Light My Fire: A Classic Rock Salute to The Doors =

Light My Fire: A Classic Rock Salute to the Doors

Studio album by Various artists
- Released: June 24, 2014
- Genre: Rock
- Label: Purple Pyramid Records
- Producer: Billy Sherwood

Light My Fire: A Classic Rock Salute to the Doors is a tribute album dedicated to the Doors. It was produced by Yes member Billy Sherwood and it features Ian Gillan, Todd Rundgren, Steve Hillage and many others. It was released on June 24, 2014, by Purple Pyramid Records.

== Track listing ==
1. "L.A. Woman" (Jimi Jamison, Ted Turner, Patrick Moraz)
2. "Love Me Two Times" (Lou Gramm, Thijs van Leer, Larry Coryell)
3. "Roadhouse Blues" (Leslie West, Brian Auger, Rod Piazza)
4. "Love Her Madly" (Mark Stein, Mick Box)
5. "Riders on the Storm" (Joe Lynn Turner, Tony Kaye, Steve Cropper)
6. "The Crystal Ship" (Edgar Winter, Chris Spedding)
7. "Intro (People Are Strange)" (Keith Emerson, Jeff 'Skunk' Baxter, Joel Druckman)
8. "People Are Strange" (David Johansen, Billy Sherwood)
9. "Touch Me" (Robert Gordon, Jordan Rudess, Steve Morse, Nik Turner)
10. "The Soft Parade" (Graham Bonnet, Christopher North, Steve Hillage)
11. "Hello, I Love You" (Ken Hensley, Roye Albrighton)
12. "Spanish Caravan" (Eric Martin, Elliot Easton)
13. "Alabama Song (Whiskey Bar)" (Todd Rundgren, Geoff Downes, Zoot Horn Rollo)
14. "Break On Through (To the Other Side)" (Mark Farner, Chick Churchill)
15. "Light My Fire" (Ian Gillan, Rick Wakeman, Steve Howe)
16. "The End" (Pat Travers, Jimmy Greenspoon)
