= The Doors: Box Set =

The Doors Box Set

Box set by the Doors
- Released: October 28, 1997
- Recorded: 1965–1971
- Genre: Rock
- Length: 257:50
- Label: Elektra
- Producers: The Doors; Bruce Botnick; Paul A. Rothchild

The Doors chronology
In Concert (1991)	The Doors Box Set (1997)	Essential Rarities (1999)

The Doors: Box Set is a box set compilation of recordings by American rock band the Doors, released on October 28, 1997. The four-disc set includes previously rare and unreleased studio, live and demo recordings, as well as a disc of the band's personal favorite tracks culled from their official discography.

== Critical reception ==
Professional ratings
Review scores
Source	Rating
AllMusic	4.5/5 stars
Iowa State Daily	5/5 stars
Uncut	4/5 stars

In a retrospective review for AllMusic, Bruce Eder gave the album a rating of four and a half out of five stars. He noted:

In essence, this was the group's own musical story told the bandmembers' way, without regard to technical perfection or record label (or corporate, or middle-brow) sensibilities with regard to taste or mass appeal, a perfect sweep-away-all-the-bullsh*t audio account of who and what they were. In the process, in the sheer power of the music and the presentation here, they not only leaped far beyond the boundaries of any of the video documentaries dealing with their history (aimed, as those were, at the widest possible audience) but also reduced the Oliver Stone movie to a piece of self-indulgent fiction.

== Track listing ==
Details are taken from the original 1997 Elektra Records box set liner notes and may differ from other sources. All songs written by the Doors (Jim Morrison, Robby Krieger, Ray Manzarek, and John Densmore), except where noted.

Disc one: Without a Safety Net
No.	Title	Venue / studio	Length
1.	"Five to One" (live)	Dinner Key Auditorium, Miami, 1969	7:29
2.	"Queen of the Highway" (alternate version)	Elektra Studios, Los Angeles, 1969	3:32
3.	"Hyacinth House" (demo)	Krieger's home studio, 1969	2:40
4.	"My Eyes Have Seen You" (demo)	World Pacific Studios, Los Angeles, 1965	2:01
5.	"Who Scared You"	Elektra, 1969	3:16
6.	"Black Train Song" (writers: The Doors, "Mystery Train" by Junior Parker; live)	The Spectrum, Philadelphia, 1970	12:22
7.	"End of the Night" (demo)	World Pacific, 1965	3:02
8.	"Whiskey, Mystics & Men"	Elektra, 1970	2:19
9.	"I Will Never Be Untrue" (live)	Aquarius Theater, Hollywood, 1969	3:56
10.	"Moonlight Drive" (demo)	World Pacific, 1965	2:31
11.	"Moonlight Drive"	Sunset Sound, Los Angeles, 1966	2:40
12.	"Rock Is Dead"	Elektra, 1969	16:39
13.	"Albinoni's Adagio in G Minor" (Tomaso Albinoni)	TTG, Hollywood, 1968	4:40

Disc two: Live in New York (all at Felt Forum, New York City, in 1970)
No.	Title	Length
1.	"Roadhouse Blues"	4:19
2.	"Ship of Fools"	5:20
3.	"Peace Frog"	3:15
4.	"Blue Sunday"	2:27
5.	"Celebration of the Lizard"	17:18
6.	"Gloria" (Van Morrison)	7:14
7.	"Crawling King Snake" (John Lee Hooker)	6:12
8.	"Money" (Hooker [sic])	2:49
9.	"Poontang Blues/Build a Woman/Sunday Trucker"	3:35
10.	"The End"	18:01

Disc three: The Future Ain't What It Used to Be
No.	Title	Venue / studio	Length
1.	"Hello to the Cities" (live)	The Ed Sullivan Show, 1967 & Cobo Hall, Detroit, 1970	0:56
2.	"Break On Through" (live)	Isle of Wight Festival 1970, England, 1970	4:32
3.	"Rock Me" (Muddy Waters; live)	PNE Coliseum, Vancouver, 1970	6:36
4.	"Money" (Hooker [sic]; live)	PNE Coliseum, 1970	2:59
5.	"Someday Soon" (live)	Seattle Center, Seattle, 1970	3:41
6.	"Go Insane" (demo)	World Pacific, 1965	2:30
7.	"Mental Floss" (live)	Aquarius Theater, 1969	3:38
8.	"Summer's Almost Gone" (demo)	World Pacific, 1965	2:17
9.	"Adolf Hitler" (live)	Boston Garden, Boston, 1970	0:12
10.	"Hello, I Love You" (demo)	World Pacific, 1965	2:28
11.	"The Crystal Ship" (live)	The Matrix, San Francisco, 1967	2:55
12.	"I Can't See Your Face in My Mind" (live)	The Matrix, 1967	3:16
13.	"The Soft Parade" (live)	PBS Television, New York City, 1969	10:03
14.	"Tightrope Ride" (Manzarek, Krieger)	The Doors Workshop, Los Angeles, 1971	4:17
15.	"Orange County Suite"	Elektra, Los Angeles, 1970	5:27

Disc four: Band favorites
No.	Title	Original album	Length
1.	"Light My Fire" (Krieger, Morrison)	The Doors	7:05
2.	"Peace Frog" (Morrison/Krieger)	Morrison Hotel	2:57
3.	"Wishful Sinful" (Krieger)	The Soft Parade	2:55
4.	"Take It As It Comes" (Morrison)	The Doors	2:14
5.	"L.A. Woman" (Morrison)	L.A. Woman	7:49
6.	"I Can't See Your Face in My Mind" (Morrison)	Strange Days	3:22
7.	"Land Ho!" (Morrison/Krieger)	Morrison Hotel	4:06
8.	"Yes, the River Knows" (Krieger)	Waiting for the Sun	2:34
9.	"Shaman's Blues" (Morrison)	The Soft Parade	4:47
10.	"You're Lost Little Girl" (Krieger)	Strange Days	2:59
11.	"Love Me Two Times" (Krieger)	Strange Days	3:15
12.	"When the Music's Over"	Strange Days	10:56
13.	"The Unknown Soldier" (Morrison)	Waiting for the Sun	3:21
14.	"Wild Child" (Morrison)	The Soft Parade	2:35
15.	"Riders on the Storm" (Morrison/The Doors)	L.A. Woman	7:09

Tracks 1–5 selected by Krieger, 6–10 by Manzarek, 11–15 by Densmore

== Charts ==
Chart performance for The Doors: Box Set
Chart (1997)	Peak position
US Billboard 200	65
UK (Music Week)	194

== Certifications ==
Region	Certification	Certified units/sales
United States (RIAA)	Platinum	1,000,000^{^}
^{^} Shipments figures based on certification alone.
