= Soundstage Performances =

- Music by: the Doors
- Production company: Eagle Vision
- Release date: October 22, 2002
- Running time: 120 minutes
- Country: United States
- Language: English

Soundstage Performances is a 2002 music DVD documentary featuring 13 live TV performances by American rock band the Doors. The compilation features three shows from three distinct stages in the band's career – a TV appearance in Toronto, Canada in 1967, a Danish TV special during the Doors only European tour in 1968 and an appearance on PBS's Critique show in 1969. Also included is Jim Morrison's only on camera interview.

== Performances ==
In early August 1967, following the success of their single "Light My Fire", the Doors appeared live on the Canadian TV show The Rock Scene: Like It Is. The band played a 13-minute rendition of "The End". Recorded by the Canadian Broadcasting Corporation (CBC) in a former movie theatre at 509 Parliament St. in Toronto the show was hosted by Noel Harrison. The show was originally broadcast in Canada on October 16, 1967, and later in the US on August 1, 1970.

The Doors arrived in London in early September 1968 for their one and only European tour. On September 18 the band were recorded for a half-hour, black and white segment for Danish TV (Television Byen) in Copenhagen. The Doors performed six songs and the performance was originally broadcast on October 30, 1968.

The Doors appeared on a PBS Critique′s episode, entitled "A Profile of Jim Morrison and The Doors - On and Off Stage", broadcast on June 25, 1969, recorded on April 28, 1969, at Channel 13's Studio 55, the former CBS Studio 58 and former Town Theatre, and former Chaloner Theatre, at 851 9th Avenue, in New York City. The band were interviewed by Richard Goldstein on April 29, 1969 and May 18, 1969. This live performance of "The Soft Parade" is the Doors's only currently known complete, live performance of the song. Morrison had been arrested at a Miami concert on March 1.

== DVD ==
=== Track listing ===
Toronto, Canada 1967 Rock Scene: Like It Is:

1. "The End"

Copenaghen, Europe 1968 Danish TV:

1. "Alabama Song (Whiskey Bar)"
2. "Back Door Man"
3. "Texas Radio & The Big Beat (The WASP)"
4. "Love Me Two Times"
5. "When The Music's Over"
6. "The Unknown Soldier"

New York, America 1969 PBS Critique Show:

1. "Tell All the People"
2. "Alabama Song (Whiskey Bar)"
3. "Back Door Man"
4. "Wishful Sinful"
5. "Build Me A Woman"
6. "The Soft Parade"

=== Bonus features ===
- Critique - The Doors 1969 interviewed by Richard Goldstein
- Band photo gallery

== Personnel ==
- Jim Morrison – vocals
- Ray Manzarek – keyboard bass
- Robbie Krieger – guitar
- John Densmore – drums
