= Live in Pittsburgh 1970 =

Live album by The Doors
- Released: March 4, 2008
- Recorded: May 2, 1970
- Venues: Pittsburgh Civic Arena, Pittsburgh PA
- Genres: Psychedelic rock, acid rock, blues rock
- Length: 79:46
- Labels: Rhino, Bright Midnight Archives, Doors Music Company
- Producer: Bruce Botnick

The Doors chronology
The Very Best of The Doors (2007)	Live in Pittsburgh 1970 (2008)	Live at the Matrix 1967 (2008)

Professional ratings
Review scores
Source	Rating
Allmusic link	4/5 stars

Live in Pittsburgh 1970 is a live album by the American rock band the Doors. The concert was recorded at the Pittsburgh Civic Arena in Pittsburgh on May 2, 1970, and released in 2008 on Rhino Records. It is the sixth full-length live set released from the Bright Midnight Archives collection which contains a number of previously unreleased live concerts by the Doors.

The concert is considered one of the better performances by the Doors with lead singer Jim Morrison providing a focused delivery of the songs. The album includes a 22-plus-minute version of "When the Music's Over" plus "Five to One" and "Break on Through". The group also performed covers of Robert Johnson's "Cross Road Blues" and the band's signature cover of "Back Door Man". Before closing with an extended take of "Light My Fire", Manzarek took the microphone with backup by Morrison for "Close to You".

== Production ==
Live In Pittsburgh 1970 was mixed and mastered by long-time Doors' sound engineer/producer Bruce Botnick. He had recorded several shows from the Doors’ 1970 Roadhouse Blues Tour on multi-track tape for the Absolutely Live album released in July 1970.

The concert would have been released sooner if it were not for two missing sections from the 8-track masters. The dialogue section that comes before "Close To You" has been replaced using the live 2-track stereo tapes and titled here as "Tonight You're In For A Special Treat". The other missing section was of the first 16 bars of music from the beginning of Manzarek's solo on "Light My Fire". Instead of allowing the missing music to prevent the release of this show, the band decided to insert the missing music from one of the other 1970 concerts.

According to Bruce Botnick, "Jim was as clear as he could be onstage, and the guys moved to and fro with him, trusting the journey. Sometimes The Doors were raging with fire and energy; at other times, when Jim jumped into the lyric of a different song, in the middle of something else, they were right there with him."

== Track listing ==
All songs written by the Doors, except where noted.

No.	Title	Writer(s)	Length
1.	"Back Door Man"	Willie Dixon, Chester Burnett	2:47
2.	"Love Hides"	Jim Morrison	2:23
3.	"Five to One"	Morrison	5:18
4.	"Roadhouse Blues"	Morrison	7:00
5.	"Mystery Train"	Junior Parker	7:53
6.	"Away in India"	Morrison	3:08
7.	"Cross Road Blues"	Robert Johnson	3:25
8.	"Universal Mind"	Morrison	4:31
9.	"Someday Soon"	Morrison	3:50
10.	"When the Music's Over"	The Doors	16:54
11.	"Break On Through (To the Other Side)"	Morrison	0:54
12.	"Push Push"	Morrison	0:23
13.	"The Soft Parade Vamp"	Morrison	4:37
14.	"Tonight You're In for a Special Treat"	Morrison	1:28
15.	"Close to You"	Dixon	5:17
16.	"Light My Fire"	Robby Krieger, Morrison	11:18

== Personnel ==
- Jim Morrison - vocals
- Ray Manzarek - organ, keyboard bass & vocals on "Close to You"
- Robby Krieger - electric guitar
- John Densmore - drums

Technical staff

- Produced, Recorded & Mixed by – Bruce Botnick
- Production Supervisor – Jeffrey Jampol
- A&R– Robin Hurley
- Product Manager – Kenny Nemes
- Project Coordinator – Cory Lashever
- Art Direction & Design – Bryan Lasley
- Liner Notes – Bruce Botnick
