= When You're Strange (soundtrack) =

When You're Strange: Music from the Motion Picture

Soundtrack album by the Doors
- Released: April 6, 2010
- Recorded: 1966–71
- Genre: Rock; spoken word; poetry
- Length: 76:17
- Label: Rhino Entertainment

The Doors chronology
The Platinum Collection (2008)	When You're Strange: Music from the Motion Picture (2010)	A Collection (2011)

Professional ratings
Review scores
Source	Rating
AllMusic	3/5 stars

When You're Strange: Music from the Motion Picture is the studio album and the soundtrack to the 2010 documentary film, narrated by Johnny Depp, about the Doors and their music. The soundtrack features 14 songs from The Doors’ six studio albums, with studio versions mixed with live versions, including performances from The Ed Sullivan Show, Television-Byen in Gladsaxe, Felt Forum in New York and Isle of Wight Festival 1970.

== Track listing ==
All songs are performed by The Doors and written by Jim Morrison, Robby Krieger, Ray Manzarek, and John Densmore, except where noted. All spoken tracks are poetry read by Johnny Depp and written by Jim Morrison, except where noted.

1. "Poem: Cinema" – 0:25
2. "Poem: The Spirit of Music" – 0:22
3. "Moonlight Drive" (Jim Morrison) – 3:01
4. "Poem: The Doors of Perception" (William Blake) – 0:08
5. "Break On Through (To the Other Side)" (Morrison) – 4:59 [stereo]
  - Live from the Isle of Wight Festival, August 30, 1970
6. "Poem: A Visitation of Energy" – 0:05
7. "Light My Fire" (Robby Krieger, Morrison) – 3:05 [mono]
  - Live from the Ed Sullivan Show, September 17, 1967
8. "Interview: To really be a superstar" (Jim Morrison) – 0:14
9. "Five to One" (Morrison) – 4:27
10. "Poem: Wasting the Dawn" – 0:25
11. "When the Music's Over" – 12:27 [mono]
  - Live from Television-Byen, Gladsaxe, Copenhagen, Denmark, September 18, 1968
12. "Interview: The Doors" – 0:29
  - "The four of us are musicians" (Jim Morrison)
  - "I'd like them to listen" (Ray Manzarek)
  - "Rock & roll and jazz" (John Densmore)
  - "Our music is symbolic" (Krieger)
13. "Hello, I Love You" (Morrison) – 2:39
14. "Interview: Dead serious" (Morrison) – 0:08
15. "People Are Strange" (Morrison, Krieger) – 2:10
16. "Poem: Inside the Dream" – 0:14
17. "Soul Kitchen" (Morrison) – 3:32
18. "Poem: We Have Been Metamorphosized" – 0:15
19. "Poem: Touch Scares" – 0:08
20. "Touch Me" (Krieger) – 3:28
21. "Poem: Naked We Come" – 0:09
22. "Poem: O Great Creator of Being" – 0:08
23. "The End" – 11:29
24. "Poem: The Girl of the Ghetto" – 0:26
25. "L.A. Woman" (Morrison) – 7:57
26. "Poem: Crossroads" – 0:10
27. "Roadhouse Blues" (Morrison) – 4:07 [stereo]
  - Live from the Felt Forum, New York, January 17, 1970
28. "Poem: Ensenada" – 0:14
29. "Riders on the Storm" – 7:16
30. "Poem: As I Look Back" – 0:11
31. "The Crystal Ship" (Morrison) – 2:32
32. "Poem: Goodbye America" – 0:24

=== Bonus tracks ===
"Love Her Madly" (Krieger) (Available from the Amazon MP3 store) [note that this is the normal version from L.A. Woman]

== Personnel ==
The Doors

- John Densmore – drums
- Robby Krieger – guitar
- Ray Manzarek – organ, keyboard bass
- Jim Morrison – vocals

Other personnel

- Johnny Depp – narration
- Larry Knechtel (uncredited) – bass guitar
- Douglass Lubahn – bass guitar
- Kerry Magness – bass guitar
- Leroy Vinnegar – acoustic bass
- Curtis Amy – saxophone solo
- George Bohanan – trombone
- Harvey Brooks – bass guitar
- Jesse McReynolds – mandolin
- Paul Harris – orchestral arrangements
- Jerry Scheff – bass guitar
- Marc Benno – guitar
