= Other Voices (The Doors album) =

Studio album by the Doors
- Released: October 18, 1971
- Recorded: June–August 1971
- Studios: The Doors' Workshop, Los Angeles
- Genre: Rock
- Length: 39:42
- Label: Elektra
- Producers: The Doors; Bruce Botnick

The Doors chronology
L.A. Woman (1971)	Other Voices (1971)	Weird Scenes Inside the Gold Mine (1972)

Singles from Other Voices
- 1. "Tightrope Ride" Released: 1971; 2. "Ships w/ Sails" Released: 1972

Other Voices is the seventh studio album by the Doors, released by Elektra Records on October 18, 1971.

It was the first album released by the band following the death of lead singer Jim Morrison in July 1971, with keyboardist Ray Manzarek and guitarist Robby Krieger sharing lead vocals. Morrison was living in Paris, France, on a sabbatical when the other Doors members began recording sessions, but Morrison died before he could return to the United States. The remaining Doors members decided to continue without Morrison.

== Background and recording ==
Following the critical and commercial success of L.A. Woman, the three other members of the Doors started recording their seventh album without Jim Morrison, who was away in Paris. Reflecting on the album in 2021, Robby Krieger noted the band's difficulty to continue working after Morrison's death:

It was a tough time, of course. When Jim was gone … we had kept going. The three of us were practicing all the time, writing new stuff. When Jim passed, we said, "Jeez, what're we going to do?" We could just give it up, or, you know, we have all these songs. Let's go in and record and see what happens. We probably shouldn’t have put it out that quick after Jim’s passing. We just felt like that was all we could do. We could've sat around and be depressed. Which we were. But, I don't know. The record company, Elektra, they were wanting us to continue. It wasn’t that hard of a decision.

== Later releases ==
Professional ratings
Review scores
Source	Rating
AllMusic	3/5 stars
Christgau's Record Guide	C+
Classic Rock	4/10
PopMatters	5/10 stars
Record Collector	(combined score for Other Voices and Full Circle)

According to Jac Holzman, Other Voices sold approximately 300,000 copies on its original release. Record World said that the single "Tightrope Ride" is "a knockout rouser that amply demonstrates the band's ability to rock on successfully with other voices."

The album was not released on CD until October 23, 2006, by the Timeless Holland label, along with the final standard Doors album, Full Circle. For years, the Doors largely disregarded the last two studio albums that were recorded without Morrison, and had no plans of reissuing the albums on CD. At the time, the Doors stated that they were not in possession of the master tapes, but remastered material from both the albums has appeared on various compilations, most notably the 1997 Box Set and the 2000 compilation The Best of the Doors.

On September 27, 2011, the Doors finally gave Other Voices (along with Full Circle) its first official reissue, though made available only via digital download. The original master tapes were confirmed to have been used in these reissues. On May 29, 2015, it was announced that Other Voices and Full Circle would be re-released together on a 2-CD set and individually on 180-gram vinyl by Rhino Records on September 4 of that year. The CD set features "Treetrunk"—the B-side of the "Get Up and Dance" single—as its only bonus track.

== Track listing ==
The LP's original Elektra Records 1971 release shows the individual song credits and lengths as listed below:

Side one
No.	Title	Writer(s)	Length
1.	"In the Eye of the Sun"	Ray Manzarek	4:48
2.	"Variety Is the Spice of Life"	Robby Krieger	2:50
3.	"Ships w/ Sails"	Krieger, John Densmore	7:38
4.	"Tightrope Ride"	Manzarek, Krieger	4:15

Side two
No.	Title	Writer(s)	Length
1.	"Down on the Farm"	Krieger	4:15
2.	"I'm Horny, I'm Stoned"	Krieger	3:55
3.	"Wandering Musician"	Krieger	6:25
4.	"Hang on to Your Life"	Manzarek, Krieger	5:36

== Personnel ==
Per album liner notes:

The Doors

- Robby Krieger – guitar, vocals, production
- Ray Manzarek – keyboards, vocals, production
- John Densmore – drums, production

Additional personnel

- Jack Conrad – bass on "In the Eye of the Sun", "Variety Is the Spice of Life" and "Tightrope Ride"
- Jerry Scheff – bass on "Down On The Farm", "I'm Horny, I'm Stoned" and "Wandering Musician"
- Wolfgang Melz – bass on "Hang on to Your Life"
- Ray Neapolitan – bass on "Ships w/ Sails"
- Willie Ruff – acoustic bass on "Ships w/ Sails"
- Francisco Aguabella – percussion on "Ships w/ Sails" and "Hang on to Your Life"
- Emil Richards – marimba on "Down on the Farm"

Production

- Bruce Botnick – production, engineering
- Ron Raffaelli – artwork

== See also ==
- Outline of the Doors
