= Live at the Aquarius Theatre: The First Performance =

Live album by the Doors
- Released: 2001
- Recorded: July 21, 1969
- Venues: Aquarius Theatre, Hollywood, Los Angeles
- Genre: Rock
- Length: 92:04
- Labels: Rhino; Bright Midnight Archives
- Producer: Bruce Botnick

The Doors chronology
The Best of The Doors (2000)	Live at the Aquarius Theatre: The First Performance (2001)	Live at the Aquarius Theatre: The Second Performance (2001)

Professional ratings
Review scores
Source	Rating
AllMusic	3/5 stars

Live at the Aquarius Theatre: The First Performance is a double live album by American rock band the Doors. It was recorded at the Aquarius Theatre in Hollywood on July 21, 1969, the day their studio album The Soft Parade was released. The album contains the band's first performance that day. The second show can be found on Live at the Aquarius Theatre: The Second Performance.

The album was released from the Bright Midnight Archives collection which contains a number of previously unreleased live concerts by the Doors.

== Track listing ==
All songs written by the Doors except where noted.

=== Disc one ===
1. Tuning - 1:09
2. Jim's Introduction - 0:54
3. Back Door Man (Willie Dixon, Chester Burnett) - 5:38
4. Break On Through (To the Other Side) (Jim Morrison) - 4:49
5. What Do We Do Next? - 0:18
6. Soul Kitchen (Morrison) - 4:44
7. You Make Me Real (Morrison) - 3:11
8. Tuning - 1:09
9. I Will Never Be Untrue (Morrison) - 3:50
10. The Crowd Humbly Requests - 0:59
11. When the Music's Over - 11:32
12. Universal Mind (Morrison) - 4:39
13. The Crowd Requests Their Favorites and Tuning - 1:20
14. Mystery Train/Crossroads (Junior Parker)/(Robert Johnson) - 6:45
15. Build Me a Woman (Morrison) - 5:35

=== Disc two ===
1. Tuning - 0:37
2. Who Do You Love? (False Start) (Bo Diddley) - 0:37
3. Who Do You Love? (Diddley) - 7:27
4. Light My Fire (Robby Krieger), (Morrison) - 10:53
5. The Crowd Requests More - 1:15
6. Celebration of the Lizard (Morrison) - 15:28

== Personnel ==
- Jim Morrison - vocals
- Ray Manzarek - organ, keyboard bass
- Robby Krieger - electric guitar
- John Densmore - drums
- Bruce Botnick - production and mastering
