= Auguries of Innocence =

Poem by William Blake

"Auguries of Innocence" is a poem by William Blake, from a notebook of his known as the Pickering Manuscript. It is assumed to have been written in 1803, but was not published until 1863 in the companion volume to Alexander Gilchrist's biography of Blake. The poem contains a series of paradoxes which speak of innocence juxtaposed with evil and corruption. It consists of 132 lines and has been published with and without breaks dividing it into stanzas. An augury is a sign or omen.

The poem begins:

To see a World in a Grain of Sand
And a Heaven in a Wild Flower
Hold Infinity in the palm of your hand
And Eternity in an hour

— Lines 1–4

It continues with a catalogue of moralising couplets, such as:

A Robin Red breast in a Cage
Puts all Heaven in a Rage

— Lines 5–6

and:

The wanton Boy that kills the Fly
Shall feel the Spiders enmity

— Lines 123–124

== Sampling ==
Some lines have been sampled by subsequent musicians:

Some are born to sweet delight,
Some are born to endless night.

— Lines 133–34

appears in the lyrics of Jim Morrison in The Doors' B-side hit End of the Night.
