= Full Circle (The Doors album) =

1972 studio album by the Doors

Studio album by the Doors
- Released: August 15, 1972
- Recorded: 1972
- Studios: A&M, Hollywood
- Genres: Rock; R&B; jazz; psychedelia
- Length: 40:05
- Label: Elektra
- Producer: The Doors

The Doors chronology
Weird Scenes Inside the Gold Mine (1972)	Full Circle (1972)	The Best of The Doors (1973)

Singles from Full Circle
- 1. "The Mosquito" / "It Slipped My Mind" Released: 1972; 2. "Get Up and Dance" / "Treetrunk" Released: 1972; 3. "The Piano Bird" / "Good Rockin" Released: 1972

Full Circle is the eighth studio album by the American rock band the Doors, released on August 15, 1972. (Note: Different sources say it is either July 17, or August 15, 1972. For this article, it will be dated as August 15, 1972.) It is the second album after Jim Morrison's death, and their last until the 1978 album An American Prayer. The album includes "The Mosquito", the last Doors single to chart.

== Recording and composition ==
The band's first album without Jim Morrison, 1971's Other Voices, had reached No. 31 on the Billboard chart, showing the group could survive Morrison's death. The band – now a trio consisting of keyboardist Ray Manzarek, guitarist Robby Krieger, and drummer John Densmore – chose to record Other Voices at their rehearsal space known as the Workshop, the same two-story building at 8512 Santa Monica Boulevard they had recorded the successful L.A. Woman, but for Full Circle they opted to move to Hollywood's A&M Studio. While Other Voices was, to a degree, an extension of the L.A. Woman sessions (some of the tracks had been worked up before Morrison had left for Paris), Full Circle was a standalone work that saw the band delve deeper into jazz and work with some top-shelf session musicians. Bruce Botnick, who had engineered all the Doors albums up to that point and co-produced both L.A. Woman and Other Voices, declined to participate in the sessions. In 2015 he admitted to Uncut's Tom Pinnock that he could not remember whether he was asked to return or not, but maintains he would have turned down the offer, reflecting, "The guys wanted to have a chance to work with some other musicians. As they went into Full Circle they took that extension even further."

The Doors hired Henry Lewy to replace Botnick, who in turn brought in Charles Lloyd and a host of session players. Lloyd contributed tenor sax and flute to the songs and also played behind the band at Central Park and at the Hollywood Bowl. As with Other Voices, Manzarek and Krieger assumed vocal duties, which were augmented with backing vocalists. Although both post-Morrison albums are viewed as non-essential to many Doors fans and critics, Full Circle produced a global hit for the band in "The Mosquito". As recounted in Uncut's 2015 profile of both LPs, the song has become one of the band's most enduring tracks across the globe, with the song's author Krieger recalling:

I was on vacation down in Mexico, and these three local musicians came down out of the hills. That would sing mariachi stuff, and they had this one song about a mosquito and that inspired me. That was actually our biggest selling single after Jim died because it was in Spanish and it did very well around the world. Not only in Latin countries, but in Europe. In fact there were a lot of covers, and some of them are pretty good.

Full Circle showed the band was still evolving musically, with the Latin fusion of "The Piano Bird" and the complex funk of "Verdilac", but tensions were mounting between Manzarek, who wanted to explore jazz, and Densmore and Krieger, who wanted to persevere with rock. "Ray just kinda said, 'Look, I'm outta here, I'm getting tired of this, it's not working,'" Krieger recalled to Uncut in 2015. "So we gave up. John and I were trying to make it work. Would we have carried on? Yeah, for sure."

In 1972, the Doors released "Get Up and Dance" as a single; the B-side was the non-album track "Treetrunk", one of only three non-album studio tracks released by the band. According to Robby Krieger, the track was left off the album because "it sounded too commercial". The song was finally given official re-release as part of the Japan edition of The Doors Singles Box in 2013.

== Release and reception ==
Professional ratings
Review scores
Source	Rating
AllMusic	3/5 stars
Christgau's Record Guide	C
Classic Rock	4/10
Record Collector	(combined score for Full Circle and Other Voices)

Full Circle was released on August 15, 1972, and peaked at No. 68 on the Billboard chart. In a retrospective assessment, AllMusic stated "While there are a handful of undeniably remarkable cuts scattered throughout, Full Circle is increasingly sporadic and less focused than its predecessor" but asserts that the album's centerpiece is "the nearly four-minute jam tacked on at the end. Manzarek's impassioned electric organ, Densmore's tricky timekeeping, and Krieger's transcendent string work are all worth mentioning as the intensity of their interplay hearkens back to former glories." In 2011 Uncut surmised of the LP, "Now the problems start. A strained-sounding attempt to boogie like a bar band, with lame lyrics about "good rocking" ... its eagerness to get our hands clapping makes it sound desperate."

Record World called the single "Get Up and Dance" a "steady rocker which is just different enough to stand up to repeated listenings."

== Later releases ==
For years the Doors largely disregarded the two post-Morrison albums, with no official American CD releases. Full Circle was released on CD October 23, 2006, by the Timeless Holland label, along with the previous (post-Morrison) Doors album Other Voices. It is relatively easy to find unofficial CD copies of Full Circle and Other Voices on the Internet, but most of these vinyl-to-CD transfers do not contain the single-only "Treetrunk", except for the Howling Wolf Records 2010 release of the two albums on one CD. This release also featured the edited single versions of "The Mosquito" and "The Piano Bird". "Treetrunk" was finally given official re-release as part of the Japan edition of The Doors Singles Box in 2013. The Doors' management has stated they are not in possession of the master tapes to the two post-Morrison albums, but remastered tracks from both of them can nevertheless be found on later official releases. The first track from Full Circle the Doors have reissued was "The Mosquito", released in 2000 as "No Me Moleste Mosquito" on the double-disc version of The Best of The Doors.

On September 27, 2011, the Doors finally gave Full Circle, along with Other Voices, its first official reissue through digital download. It was confirmed that the original master tapes were used for these reissues.

On May 29, 2015, it was announced that Other Voices and Full Circle would be re-released together on a 2-CD set and individually on 180-gram vinyl by Rhino Records on September 4 of that year. The CD set features "Treetrunk"—the B-side of the "Get Up and Dance" single—as its only bonus track.

== Track listing ==
Side A
No.	Title	Writer(s)	Length
1.	"Get Up and Dance"	Ray Manzarek, Robby Krieger	2:26
2.	"4 Billion Souls"	Krieger	3:18
3.	"Verdilac"	Krieger, Manzarek	5:40
4.	"Hardwood Floor"	Krieger	3:38
5.	"Good Rockin'"	Roy Brown	4:22

Side B
No.	Title	Writer(s)	Length
1.	"The Mosquito"	Krieger, John Densmore, Manzarek	5:16
2.	"The Piano Bird"	Densmore, Jack Conrad	5:50
3.	"It Slipped My Mind"	Krieger	3:11
4.	"The Peking King and the New York Queen"	Manzarek	6:25

Bonus track on 2015 re-release
No.	Title	Writer(s)	Length
10.	"Treetrunk"	Robby Krieger	2:56

Side A (Italian cassette version)
No.	Title	Writer(s)	Length
1.	"The Peking King and the New York Queen"	Manzarek	6:25
2.	"The Piano Bird"	Densmore, Conrad	5:50
3.	"Hardwood Floor"	Krieger	3:38
4.	"Good Rockin"	Roy Brown	4:22

Side B (Italian cassette version)
No.	Title	Writer(s)	Length
1.	"The Mosquito"	Krieger, Densmore, Manzarek	5:16
2.	"Verdilac"	Krieger, Manzarek	5:40
3.	"It Slipped My Mind"	Krieger	3:11
4.	"Get Up and Dance"	Krieger, Manzarek	2:26
5.	"4 Billion Souls"	Krieger	3:18

== Personnel ==
Personnel taken from Full Circle liner notes.

The Doors

- Robby Krieger – guitar, vocals, harmonica on "Hardwood Floor"
- Ray Manzarek – keyboards, vocals
- John Densmore – drums

Additional personnel

- Venetta Fields – vocals
- Clydie King – vocals
- Melissa MacKay – vocals
- Chico Batera – percussion on "The Piano Bird" and "The Peking King and the New York Queen"
- Leland Sklar – bass on "Hardwood Floor", "The Mosquito" and "It Slipped My Mind"
- Jack Conrad – bass on "4 Billion Souls", "Good Rockin'", "The Piano Bird" and "The Peking King and the New York Queen"; rhythm guitar on "The Piano Bird"
- Charles Larkey – bass on "Verdilac" and "The Piano Bird"
- Chris Ethridge – bass on "Get Up and Dance"
- Bobbye Hall – percussion on "Verdilac", "The Piano Bird" and "The Peking King and the New York Queen"
- Charles Lloyd – tenor saxophone on "Verdilac", flute on "The Piano Bird"

Technical staff and artwork

- The Doors – production
- Henry Lewy – engineering
- Pacific Eye & Ear – cover concept
- Joe Garnett – cover illustration

== Chart information ==
Chart performance for Full Circle
Chart (1972)	Peak position
US Billboard Top LPs & Tape	68
US Cashbox Top 100 Albums	42

Chart performance for singles from Full Circle
Single	Year	Chart	Position
"The Mosquito" / "It Slipped My Mind"	1972	US Hot 100	85
"Get Up and Dance" / "Treetrunk"	1972	UK Pop Singles	84

== See also ==
- Outline of the Doors
