= Runnin' Blue =

Single by the Doors

from the album The Soft Parade
- B-side: "Do It"
- Released: August 1969
- Recorded: 1968–1969
- Genre: R&B; soul; bluegrass
- Length: 2:33
- Label: Elektra
- Songwriter: Robby Krieger
- Producer: Paul A. Rothchild

The Doors singles chronology
"Tell All the People" (1969)	"Runnin' Blue" (1969)	"You Make Me Real" (1970)

"Runnin' Blue" is a song written by guitarist Robby Krieger and performed by the Doors. Elektra Records released it in August 1969 as the fourth single from the band's fourth album The Soft Parade, backed with "Do It". The single peaked at No. 64 on the Billboard Hot 100 chart and at No. 40 on the Cash Box Top 100 chart.

Robby Krieger shares vocals with Jim Morrison for the chorus of the track, the only Doors song on which Krieger had a lead vocal while Morrison was alive.

== Lyrics ==
"Runnin' Blue was inspired by the recent death of Otis Redding. Morrison sang the introduction to the song, which referenced Redding's death and was based on a Lead Belly song, "Poor Howard", to which Morrison inserted Redding's name:

Poor Otis, dead and gone
Left me here to sing his song
Pretty little girl with the red dress on
Poor Otis, dead and gone

The lyrics also reference Redding's song "(Sittin' On) The Dock of the Bay." Music critic Bart Testa found it ironic that this Doors song was extolling "The Dock of the Bay", which for Redding was a place of defeat and "where he wasted time having found the struggle for life useless", when earlier Doors songs such as "The End" and "When the Music's Over" call vehemently for revolution. Testa also notes that the line from "Runnin' Blue" stating "Don't fight/Too much to lose" contradicts those earlier songs.

Rolling Stone critic Alec Dubro criticized the poetry of the introduction for being "excessive".

== Musical style and reception ==
The song features elements from R&B and contributions by bluegrass musicians; including Jesse McReynolds on the mandolin. The song begins with a fiddle played by Jimmy Buchanan and builds to a refrain which Testa compares to "Touch Me", the Doors earlier hit from The Soft Parade. The refrain of the song refers to "runnin' back to L.A.," and from this Testa sees a progression in the song from starting out in the country, represented by the fiddle and running towards the big city.

"Runnin' Blue" received varied comments, among those, Billboard described it as a "solid rocker with a clever arrangement from start to finish," and also as one of the best new songs on Soft Parade, while AllMusic critic Richie Unterberger dismissed it as a "strange bluegrass-soul blend" and regarded it as one of the weakest songs on Soft Parade. Rolling Stone critic Dave Marsh called it the Doors' "only really humane song", saying that it is "puppy-dog-charming in its clumsiness and lack of anything approaching soulfulness." Cash Box described it as "smooth, adaptable for dance-minded teens, and even more commercially potent than" the Doors' recent singles, and incorporating a touch of country music. Record World said "features some heavy production touches and a stompin' beat the kids will dig." Ultimate Classic Rock included it among the "Top 10 Robby Krieger Doors Songs". Chris Ingalls of PopMatters overviewing the 50th Anniversary edition of The Soft Parade, declared "Runnin' Blue" as one of the "oddities" of the album, and deemed its chorus as "cringe-worthy". The song was also included on the Doors 1972 compilation album Weird Scenes Inside the Gold Mine.

== Personnel ==
The Doors

- Jim Morrison – lead vocals
- Ray Manzarek – Gibson Kalamazoo organ
- Robby Krieger – guitar, chorus lead vocal
- John Densmore – drums

Additional musicians

- Harvey Brooks – bass guitar
- Paul Harris – orchestral arrangements
- Jimmy Buchanan – fiddle
- Jesse McReynolds – mandolin
