= My Eyes Have Seen You =

Song by the Doors

Song by the Doors

from the album Strange Days
- Released: September 25, 1967
- Recorded: February 8, 1967
- Length: 2:22
- Label: Elektra
- Songwriter: The Doors
- Producer: Paul A. Rothchild

"My Eyes Have Seen You" is a song originally written by Jim Morrison and credited to Morrison, Ray Manzarek, John Densmore and Robby Krieger that was released on the Doors' 1967 album Strange Days.

== Writing and recording ==
"My Eyes Have Seen You" was one of the first songs Morrison wrote. It was the second song that he played for Manzarek (after "Summer's Almost Gone") when they met at Venice Beach in July 1965, a meeting that ultimately led to the formation of the Doors. On September 2, 1965, an early version of the Doors, before Krieger joined, recorded the song for a demo at World Pacific Studios in Los Angeles. This version was later released on the 1997 album The Doors: Box Set. Morrison biographer Stephen Davis claims that the demo version has such heavy echo-chamber sound that the vocals don't sound like Morrison.

In 1967, "My Eyes Have Seen You" was recorded for the Doors' second album Strange Days on February 8, 1967 during an afternoon session at Sunset Sound Recorders. This version was speeded up from the demo version and incorporated a distorted piano sound. Davis felt that this version was reminiscent of the Rolling Stones' "Let's Spend the Night Together". Music journalist Gillian Gaar felt Morrison's vocal performance on the Strange Days recording was "deeper" and "richer" than on the demo version due to his maturing as a singer. Pop culture writer Tony Thompson said that this recording "retains some of the garage energy of the demo version but has evolved into a more psychedelic outing."

== Lyrics and music ==
Morrison wrote the song lyrics in Venice, California and the lyrics describe the television antennas he could see from his roof. One of the themes that has been identified in "My Eyes Have Seen You" is "the equation of ocular vision and love", a theme also identified in the song that follows it on Strange Days, "I Can't See Your Face in My Mind". Mitchell Harrison of The Herald interpreted the song as an attack on society's hypocrisy, particularly the line "free from disguise, gazing down on the city of the television skies." Los Angeles Times critic Linda Matthews interpreted the song as a "bizarre story about seduction." Courier-Post critic Beth Gillin also felt the song is about seduction.

Thompson described Kreiger's guitar solo as being "reasonably heavy" and said that the song sounds "a bit punk rock."

== Reception ==
Allmusic critic Richie Unterberger called "My Eyes Have Seen You" a "mild but pleasing [entry]" with "a subdued Eastern psychedelic air." The Rolling Stone review of Strange Days called it a "heavy, evocative and climactic piece" that has "the same commercial potential of 'Light My Fire.'"

== Live performances ==
The Doors frequently performed "My Eyes Have Seen You" at live shows in clubs in 1966 and 1967.
