= Rock Is Dead (The Doors song) =

Song by the Doors

from the album The Soft Parade (50th Anniversary Edition)
- Released: 2019
- Recorded: February 25, 1969
- Studio: Sunset Sound Recorders, Los Angeles
- Genre: R&B; blues
- Length: 16:30 (edit); 64:03 (full length)
- Label: Rhino
- Songwriters: The Doors; Brian Carman & Bob Spickard; Vera Matson a.k.a. Ken Darby; Junior Parker; Sam Phillips; Elvis Presley

"Rock Is Dead" is a jam session by the Doors, recorded on February 25, 1969, at Sunset Sound Recorders in the Hollywood neighborhood of Los Angeles. Doors singer Jim Morrison described the recording as "throwing up these old songs in the studio. Blues trips. Rock classics ... the whole history of rock music—blues, rock and roll, Latin jazz, surf music". The song credits acknowledge some of the writers of the original songs. It featured session musician Harvey Brooks on bass guitar.

== Background ==
According to biographer Stephen Davis, the song began as a jam in the studio after a night out dining and drinking at a local Mexican restaurant: "the band played free-form R&B, improvising about the death of rock and roll". He added the song was:

Jim Morrison's disgusted explicit farewell to the rock movement that had launched him into immortality. It summed up the depressive, changing climate of the youth movement of 1969, when the Haight-Ashbury had become a slum of panhandlers, burnouts, and runaways ... The Doors had lost the avant-garde, and were now hated by the same writers who had fawned on them the year before ... For Jim, rock was truly dead.

A heavily edited version lasting 16:30 was released on the bootleg album "Rock Is Dead" (Tangie Town Records TTR 9003) in 1982, then officially released on The Doors: Box Set in 1997 and the 50th Anniversary Edition of The Soft Parade contains the complete 64:03 version.

== Critical reception ==
In an AllMusic review of The Doors Box Set, critic Bruce Eder commented: "the 16-and-half-minute jam/rap (including a reference to 'Mystery Train') from the Morrison Hotel sessions, entitled 'Rock Is Dead,' where, fueled on wine and good food, they let the tape roll on this astonishing extended musical moment. Here, Morrison's singing, two years beforehand, gets fully at the raw, bluesy sound it would acquire for the subsequent L.A. Woman album."

Richie Unterberger in his review of the 50th Anniversary Edition of The Soft Parade, noted "The centerpiece of these two bonus discs is 'Rock Is Dead,' an hour-long studio blues jam that has been heavily bootlegged but never released in this complete form. Alternately maddening and compelling, 'Rock Is Dead' is worth the price of admission."
