= You're Lost Little Girl =

Song by the Doors

Song by the Doors

from the album Strange Days
- Released: September 25, 1967
- Recorded: 1967
- Genre: Psychedelic rock
- Length: 3:01
- Label: Elektra
- Songwriter: The Doors
- Producer: Paul A. Rothchild

"You're Lost Little Girl" is a song written by Robby Krieger and credited to Krieger, Jim Morrison, Ray Manzarek and John Densmore that was first released on The Doors' 1967 album Strange Days. It was later released on several compilation albums. It was also covered by Siouxsie and the Banshees on their 1987 album Through the Looking Glass.

== Writing and recording ==
"You're Lost Little Girl" was the first song that Krieger wrote, prior to joining the Doors. It was recorded for Strange Days in September 1967. Krieger had difficulty recording his guitar solo until producer Paul A. Rothchild turned off the lights, lit some candles in the studio, and got Krieger stoned on hashish, at which point Krieger nailed the solo on the first take. Morrison also had difficulty recording the lead vocal. Rothchild wanted Morrison to sing the song like Frank Sinatra. For one attempt he brought in either a prostitute or Morrison's girlfriend Pamela Courson to give Morrison fellatio as he sang. According to Densmore, a subsequent take was used. Densmore said that that take "had a tranquil mood like the aftermath of a large explosion."

== Lyrics and music ==
The lyrics of "You're Lost Little Girl" tell of a woman who appears to have lost her identity. The singer asks her if she knows who she is and tells her that she has the power to find herself and knows what she needs to do.

The song begins with session bass guitarist Doug Lubahn playing a walking bassline and Krieger's guitar riff. Morrison then begins his "somber" vocal with the line "You're lost little girl/You're lost little girl/You're lost/Tell me who/Are you?," and his vocal continues to increase with emotion throughout the song. Krieger plays a guitar solo later in the song.

== Reception ==
Allmusic critic Tom Maginnis described "You're Lost Little Girl" as "a delicately haunting ballad and "a well-crafted song, blending a beautifully rendered vocal melody by Jim Morrison with subtly textured musical backing." Allmusic critic Matthew Greenwald called it "one of the most beautiful and under-recognized Doors songs." Tulsa World critic Ronald E. Butler said that it "draws on the Byrds' style of delicate, high-running guitar over bass line to create a haunting, beautiful effect." Music critic Barney Hoskyns called the song "psychedelic Sinatra". Pop culture writer Tony Thompson praised the way Morrison emphasizes the words "lost", "who" and "impossible". Thompson also praised Krieger's guitar solo, but felt it was too brief. Crawdaddy! critic Sandy Pearlman said that the bass guitar opening "smacks of the pulp mystery (crime detective) movie music of the era 1940 – 1960."

In 1970, the song was included on the compilation album 13. It was also included on the 1997 album The Doors: Box Set.

In 1989, Krieger included an instrumental version on his album No Habla, which Greenwald praised as the album's "finest moment." But Courier-Journal critic Mark Clark felt the rendition sounded like background music.

== Siouxsie and the Banshees version ==
Siouxsie and the Banshees covered "You're Lost Little Girl" on their 1987 album Through the Looking Glass. Thompson said of this version that "without doing anything radical to the melody, she finds an almost German cabaret element to it", and sounds a lot like Nico when she was singing with the Velvet Underground. Valley News critic Terry Atkinson said that it "achieves a subtly nightmarish atmosphere but falls well below the quality and complexity Jim Morrison gave it." Ann Arbor News critic Harmen Mitchell felt it was "curiously studied" and "sounded like the way Marianne Faithfull might have covered it in 1969." Omaha World-Herald reviwer James Healy called the cover "eerie."
