= The Spy (The Doors song) =

Song by the Doors

from the album Morrison Hotel
- Released: February 9, 1970
- Recorded: 1969
- Studio: Elektra Sound Recorders, Los Angeles
- Genre: Blues
- Length: 4:17
- Label: Elektra
- Songwriter: Jim Morrison
- Producer: Paul A. Rothchild

"The Spy" is a song by the American rock band the Doors. It was written entirely by lead singer Jim Morrison initially calling it "The Spy in the House of Love", and included as the eighth track on the 1970 LP Morrison Hotel.

== Composition and lyrics ==
"The Spy" is a slow blues song, led by Robby Krieger's guitar riff, accompanied by Ray Manzarek's piano. It features a slow drum beat played with brushes by John Densmore and a bass guitar played by Ray Neapolitan.

Jim Morrison wrote the song in 1969, the year of Morrison Hotel sessions began. The song's lyrics discuss the problems in Jim Morrison's relationship with Pamela Courson. Morrison sings about the mistrust in what she was doing, even reaching the point of manipulating Pamela. The song is based on the Anaïs Nin novel, "A Spy in the House of Love". The song was sometimes played live, without modifications, except for a "jam" in the middle of the song.

== Critical reception ==
The Classic Rock Review website describes the song in a positive review as “a jazz nightclub scene and is different than anything else The Doors have ever recorded. Morrison’s vocals are reserved but potent, as are the lyrics which border on the fine line between true love and total manipulation."

== Personnel ==
Per 2007 40th Anniversary Edition album liner notes.

- Jim Morrison – vocals
- Ray Manzarek – organ, piano
- Robby Krieger – guitar
- John Densmore – drums (with brushes)

Additional musicians

- Ray Neapolitan – bass guitar
