= The Soft Parade (song) =

Song by the Doors

from the album The Soft Parade
- Released: July 18, 1969
- Studio: Elektra Sound Recorders, Hollywood, California
- Genre: Art rock; poetry
- Length: 8:40 (original): 9:41 (40th Anniversary edition)
- Label: Elektra
- Songwriter: Jim Morrison
- Producer: Paul A. Rothchild

"The Soft Parade" is a song composed by the American rock group the Doors, though credited to lead singer Jim Morrison only. It was recorded for their fourth studio album, also titled The Soft Parade (1969), appearing as the closing track. It is considered one of the band’s most musically diverse compositions.

The 40th Anniversary remastered edition of the album reinstates an intro before the 'Petition the Lord with Prayer' section of the song, where Jim Morrison laments he's "troubled immeasurably" by the eyes of an unknown figure or subject. This piece was subsequently included as a bonus track on the 50th Anniversary release under the title "I Am Troubled".

== Composition ==
The main body of "The Soft Parade" is notated in 4/4 time. The song was completed with the help of record producer Paul A. Rothchild by helping Morrison to organise pieces of his poetry books. As Rothchild himself recalled, "I'd ask Jim to get out his notebooks of poetry and we'd go through them and find a piece that fit rhythmically and conceptually. A lot of the fragments there were just bits of poetry we put together." The lyrics draws comparison to William Blake as well as T. S. Eliot's poem "Ash Wednesday", much like many other selections of Morrison's poetry, which are heavily influenced by other poets and authors, notably "Break On Through (To the Other Side)" and "Not to Touch the Earth".

"The Soft Parade" itself was an expression coined by Morrison to indicate the bizarre and varied humanity that populated Sunset Boulevard in Los Angeles daily. His lyrics express need and pursuit for sanctuary, escape, and pleasure from his point of view. At the beginning of the song, Morrison starts out defiantly with spoken words reminiscent of a Christian revivalist preacher. The track then goes into a harpsichord driven semi-introductory piece with lyrics such as, "Can you give me sanctuary? / I must find a place to hide" referencing Morrison's then-current problems, most notably his arrests during the Miami and New Haven concerts. Afterwards, the beat picks up and the song progressively gets faster, followed by an upbeat and soft section before going into a wild psychedelic part that ends the song. Morrison remarks at the beginning of that section in ecstasy, "This is the best part of the trip!"

== Live performance ==
A rare performance of the song in its entirety was filmed for a PBS Doors television documentary, and later included on other Doors compilation DVDs. The band performed it along with "Tell All the People" and "Wishful Sinful". Keyboardist Ray Manzarek cited the performance decades later as "all four Doors in perfect simpatico". It also features a rare filmed appearance of a bearded Morrison, who usually shaved off his beard for publicity shots and television appearances. After the show, the band were interviewed by host and Village Voice music critic Richard Goldstein.

== Critical reception ==
In a contemporary review of The Soft Parade, Rolling Stone critic Alec Dubro found the title track to be a highlight of the album; however, he also expressed that "the thing is so mangled, so jammed together and frequently so silly that it’s kind of hard to listen all through its 8:40 for the good." Author David V. Moskowitz, formulated that "The Soft Parade" marked "a return to the band's bluesy roots". The English band the Electric Soft Parade borrowed their name from the song's title.

Writing for AllMusic, Richie Unterberger described "The Soft Parade" as "a multi-part suite" and praised it as "one of the band's best attempts to mix rock with poetry". Sal Cinquemani of Slant Magazine, negatively derided the lyrics to the final segment as "probably the most insightful of all". Stereogum's Ryan Leas found it one of the Doors' weirdest lengthy album closers, adding that its final section sounds "like the kind of thing that should've soundtracked a lot of weird druggy late-'60s parties in the woods, or something". The New Rolling Stone Album Guide dismissed the effort as a "long concept" that "doesn't work".

== Personnel ==
Details are taken from the 2019 The Soft Parade reissue album booklet and The Doors – Sounds for Your Soul – Die Musik Der Doors book:

The Doors

- Jim Morrison – lead and backing vocals
- Ray Manzarek – Hammond C-3 organ, harpsichord
- Robby Krieger – electric guitar
- John Densmore – drums

Additional musicians

- Harvey Brooks – bass guitar
- Reinol Andino – congas
