= End of the Night =

1967 song by the Doors

Single by the Doors

from the album The Doors
- A-side: "Break On Through (To the Other Side)"
- Released: January 1, 1967
- Recorded: September 14, 1966
- Studio: Sunset Sound Recorders Hollywood, California
- Genre: Psychedelia
- Length: 2:49
- Label: Elektra
- Songwriter: The Doors
- Producer: Paul A. Rothchild

The Doors singles chronology
"Break On Through (To the Other Side)" / "End of the Night" (1967)	"Light My Fire" (1967)

"End of the Night" is a song by the American psychedelic rock band the Doors. It was featured on the band's debut album and then released as the B-side to the album's first single, "Break On Through (To the Other Side)" in January 1967.

After the band's rise to fame the song was rarely played live in concert; it has since been included in box sets released over the years by the band.

== Composition and lyrics ==
"End of the Night" is essentially a psychedelic track, in the key of E Minor, with Jim Morrison's vocal range spanning from D_{4} to G_{5}. It is also in 4/4 time. The song was written in the band's early days, before guitarist Robby Krieger had joined the group. It was recorded in 1965 in an attempt to land a deal with Aura Records; however, the band failed to get signed. In 1966, when they were signed to Elektra Records, the song was recorded for their self-titled debut album. In the recording, Krieger provided a distinct slide guitar, tuned in a minor tuning. As Krieger himself explained, "I'd try different tunings until one worked".

Although the songwriting credit was given to all four members of the Doors, the lyrics were written by Morrison. Its title is derived from the 1932 French novel Journey to the End of the Night by Louis-Ferdinand Celine. The line "Some are born to sweet delight; some are born to endless night" is lifted from a William Blake poem "Auguries of Innocence", written in 1803 and published in 1863.

The track was recorded during an afternoon session on September 14, 1966 at Sunset Sound Recorders.

== Release and reception ==
Chart (1967)	Position
US Billboard Hot 100	126

The song was chosen as the B-side to the album's first single, "Break On Through (To the Other Side)" and was released in January 1967. The single, however, failed to become a success and only peaked at number 126 in the U.S. Reviewing the "Break on Through" single, Cash Box said that "End of the Night" is a "bluesy shuffler that also merits watching."

PopMatters critic Andy Hermann declared "End of the Night" as one of the "weirder" and moodier songs in the Doors' catalogue. In an AllMusic album review of The Doors, critic Richie Unterberger described the song's melody as "mysterious". Sal Cinquemani of Slant Magazine praised Krieger's guitar solo, for being "sufficiently trippy," but he wrote that the song was "less ambitious (and less successful)" than the other album tracks. Lacey Cohen of Screen Rant ranked it the weakest song on the album. Nevertheless, she described it as "a blissfully eerie song" and "the perfect b-side" to "Break On Through (To the Other Side)". Sputnikmusic reviewer Ian Philips noted that the "dreamy, mysterious 'End of the Night'" highlights "the group's remarkable affinity for shrewd, poetic, profound lyrics."

== Personnel ==
Personnel are taken from the 50th anniversary edition of The Doors and the 2001 book The Doors – Sounds for Your Soul – Die Musik Der Doors:

- Jim Morrison – vocals
- Ray Manzarek – Vox Continental organ, keyboard bass, piano
- Robby Krieger – slide guitar
- John Densmore – drums
