= Tell All the People =

Single by the Doors

from the album The Soft Parade
- B-side: "Easy Ride"
- Released: June 1969
- Recorded: November 12 & 20, 1968
- Genre: Pop
- Length: 3:25 (single version); 3:24 (album version)
- Label: Elektra
- Songwriter(s): Robby Krieger
- Producer(s): Paul A. Rothchild

The Doors singles chronology
"Wishful Sinful" (1969)	"Tell All the People" (1969)	"Runnin' Blue" (1969)

"Tell All the People" is a song by American rock band the Doors and was written by band guitarist Robby Krieger. It was the A-side backed with "Easy Ride" – an outtake from Waiting for the Sun recorded in March 1968 – and was released in June 1969. Also known as "Follow Me Down" due to the use of the phrase, it was the third single from the Doors' fourth album The Soft Parade. The song's instrumentation incorporates brass instruments and other orchestral instruments.

In the US, "Tell All the People" reached No. 57 on the Billboard Hot 100 charts and No. 33 on the Cash Box Top 100 chart. The US single release of the song contains a longer fade-out and runs few seconds longer than the album version as a result.

== Album credits ==
For the first time on a Doors album, all the songs on The Soft Parade had individual songwriter credits. Previously, all songs had been credited to the entire group. This change was instigated by Jim Morrison, who did not want to be held responsible for the lyrics of "Tell All the People", which includes a line encouraging listeners to "...get your guns." Krieger later said that Morrison was apprehensive of attendees bringing guns to concerts. Krieger refused to change the line. When interviewed by Jerry Hopkins for Rolling Stone, Morrison said: "In the beginning, I wrote most of the songs, the words and music. On each successive album, Robby [Krieger] contributed more songs. Until finally on this album it's almost split between us." According to The Doors FAQ author Richie Weidman, Morrison's general opinion about "Tell All the People" is that it had "terrible, corny lyrics", but it was overall a "nice song".

== Reception ==
The song received a mixed reaction by critics. Creem Magazine called it "innocuous enough hippie call-to-arms with none of the jumbled wit of John Lennon's 'Come Together'." Rolling Stone critic Alec Dubro also related "Tell All the People" with "Touch Me" as "horn-string showpieces" for lead vocalist Jim Morrison which "stick that idiocy (of the Doors' typical reductio-ad-absurdum poetry) right up front and surround it", and derided the orchestral accompaniment as "the most cliche-ridden sounds". Cash Box described it as "slow, but rippling with the power of a large supporting group" and as having "a mighty sound." Record World called it "a big new hit – one of [the Doors'] best ever."

Writing for Ultimate Classic Rock in a retrospective review, critic Nick DeRiso claims that "Tell All the People" tries "for a (previous Doors hit single) 'Touch Me' kind of alchemy," but instead "comes off as strangely morose." In an AllMusic album review of The Soft Parade, critic Richie Unterberger described it as an "uncharacteristically wistful" tune that was "not all that good, and not sung very convincingly by Morrison."
