= The Soft Parade =

Studio album by the Doors
- Released: July 18, 1969
- Recorded: March 3, 1968 ("Easy Ride"); July 26, 1968 - January 15, 1969
- Studios: Elektra, Hollywood
- Genres: Psychedelic rock; jazz rock; art rock; blues rock; experimental
- Length: 33:39
- Label: Elektra
- Producer: Paul A. Rothchild

The Doors chronology
Waiting for the Sun (1968)	The Soft Parade (1969)	Morrison Hotel (1970)

Singles from The Soft Parade
- 1. "Touch Me" Released: December 1968; 2. "Wishful Sinful" Released: March 1969; 3. "Tell All the People" Released: June 1969; 4. "Runnin' Blue" Released: August 1969

The Soft Parade is the fourth studio album by American rock band the Doors, released on July 18, 1969 by Elektra Records. Most of the album was recorded following a grueling tour during which the band was left with little time to compose new material. Record producer Paul A. Rothchild recommended a total departure from the Doors' first three albums: develop a fuller sound by incorporating brass and string arrangements provided by Paul Harris. Lead singer Jim Morrison, who was dealing with personal issues and focusing more on his poetry, was less involved in the songwriting process, allowing guitarist Robby Krieger to increase his own creative output.

The album peaked at number six on the Billboard 200 but it failed to retain audiences in the UK and other European countries that their previous album, Waiting for the Sun, had succeeded in engaging. Three preceding singles, "Touch Me", "Wishful Sinful", and "Tell All the People", were included on The Soft Parade, with the first becoming another Top 10 hit for the Doors. Another single, "Runnin' Blue", also followed the album's distribution. Upon release, The Soft Parade was denounced by both music critics and the band's underground music scene followers, who viewed the record as the Doors' trending into popular music. Over time, historians have reassessed the album and its critical standing has slightly improved, but it remains widely considered to be the group's weakest effort with Morrison.

== Background ==
By mid-1968, the Doors had established themselves as one of the most popular groups in the US. The band's third studio album, Waiting for the Sun, released in July of that year, became the Doors' only number one hit on the Billboard 200 while spawning "Hello, I Love You", their second number one single. The album was the first commercial breakthrough for the band in the UK, reaching number 16 on the UK Albums Chart. After the release of Waiting for the Sun, the Doors commanded substantial performance fees and played before large crowds in such arenas as the L.A. Forum, the Hollywood Bowl, and Madison Square Garden. Additionally, local Los Angeles Top 40 radio stations, KHJ Radio in particular, which had previously refused to play the band's records, began sponsoring the Doors' live performances. Initial sessions for the album occurred on July 26, 1968, when the band recorded "Wild Child" and "Wishful Sinful". ("Easy Ride" was a Waiting for the Sun leftover, recorded on March 3, 1968.) In September 1968, the group played dates in Europe with Jefferson Airplane, before ending their long, grueling tour schedule with nine concerts in the US. While the 1968 tours managed to capitalize on the chart success of Waiting for the Sun, it left little time for the Doors to compose new songs for The Soft Parade, having already exhausted all the material from Morrison's songbooks.

Throughout 1968, Morrison's behavior became increasingly erratic: he began drinking heavily and distanced himself from studio work to focus on his more immediate passions, poetry and filmmaking. At the time, Morrison was also struggling with anxiety, and felt like he was on the brink of a nervous breakdown. He considered quitting the Doors, but was persuaded by keyboardist Ray Manzarek to finish recording The Soft Parade before making such a decision.

In November 1968, the band entered the newly established studio Elektra Sound West on La Cienega Boulevard to continue work on The Soft Parade, a process that was not completed until May 1969. Without any album-ready material to work with, record producer Paul A. Rothchild took control of the recording sessions and insisted on numerous retakes of songs, much to the group's indignation. "It was like pulling teeth to get Jim into it", sound engineer Bruce Botnick recalled. "It was bizarre ... the hardest I ever worked as a producer." Rothchild, who by this time was addicted to cocaine and incredibly strict in his leadership, caused severe strife in the studio, especially with his advisor Jac Holzman, who argued that the drive for perfection was "grinding them [The Doors] into the ground". The album was by far the most expensive by the group, costing US$80,000 to create, compared to the US$10,000 required for their debut.

== Music ==
The Doors wanted to redefine what could be accomplished within the rock medium. Looking for a new, creative sound, Rothchild hired Paul Harris to arrange string and orchestral arrangements for the Los Angeles Philharmonic and local jazz horn players. Session musicians Doug Lubahn and Harvey Brooks also served as additional bass guitarists. The group incorporated elements of jazz rock, funk, psychedelic rock, art rock and experimental sounds, alongside their usual blues rock. Drummer John Densmore and Manzarek, who both had jazz backgrounds, asserted they were receptive to Rothchild's jazz concept: "We'd [Densmore and Manzarek] always talk about using some jazz musicians – let's put some horns and strings on, man, let's see what it would be like to record with a string section and a big horn section," recalled Manzarek.

Although Morrison was less involved in the Doors' studio sessions at this point, he demanded the band receive individual writing credits after initially refusing to sing Krieger's lyric, "Can't you see me growing, get your guns" on the track "Tell All the People". As a result, The Soft Parade was the first Doors album to list band members separately rather than collectively as "Songs by the Doors." Krieger continued to hone his songwriting skills to fill the void left by Morrison's absence. He wrote half of the album's tracks, while Morrison is credited with the other half (they share credit on "Do It"), ultimately creating an album that lacks the unified musical stance found in the Doors' early works.

Krieger's songs, written almost independently from the rest of the band, most noticeably incorporated the jazz influences. Only his tracks, "Tell All the People", "Touch Me", "Runnin' Blue", and "Wishful Sinful", were written to include string and horn arrangements; Morrison, though not totally opposed to the concept, declined to go in the direction Densmore and Manzarek championed. "Touch Me" (penned under the working titles "Hit Me" and "I'm Gonna Love You") was chosen as the first single taken from The Soft Parade, becoming one of the Doors' biggest hits. The band brought in the saxophone player Curtis Amy to perform a solo instrumental on the song, which was influenced by the works of John Coltrane.

Journalists Nathan Brackett and Christian Hoard found "Wild Child" as "Morrison parodying himself." "Shaman's Blues" and the title track were both examples of the singer's penchant for using symbolism and autobiographical insights. The latter song, a stylistic return to a lengthy track closing a Doors album, was penned with the help of Rothchild, who organized pieces of Morrison's poetry with him to align rhythmically and conceptually. Introduced with a mock-fiery sermon by Morrison, "The Soft Parade" displays his Southern roots through his portrayal as a preacher. The song's ambiance is heightened by the striking imagery which outlines a need for sanctuary, escape, and pleasure. Critic Doug Sundling noted that "The Soft Parade", with its display of funk, jazz, acid rock and psychedelic pop influences, is more diverse than any other composition of the group.

== Release and reception ==
Professional ratings
Review scores
Source	Rating
AllMusic	3.5/5 stars
Goldmine Magazine	4/5 stars
MusicHound Rock	3.5/5
PopMatters	7/10
The Encyclopedia of Popular Music	2/5 stars
The Rolling Stone Album Guide	3/5 stars
Slant Magazine	2.5/5 stars
The Village Voice	B−

The Soft Parade was released on July 18, 1969. It peaked at number six on the Billboard 200, during a chart stay of 28 weeks, but fared poorly in the UK where the album failed to reach the charts. The album's front cover photograph was taken by Joel Brodsky, who had also been responsible for the cover of the Doors' debut album and Strange Days. Three singles had already been released prior to the album's distribution, much more than usual for a Doors album. The "Touch Me" single was released in December 1968 and became one of the band's biggest hits, reaching number three on the Billboard Hot 100. Two additional singles, "Wishful Sinful" and "Tell All the People", were also distributed but fared less favorably, peaking at numbers 44 and 57 respectively. Following the release of The Soft Parade, the Doors earned another minor hit with the "Runnin' Blue" single, charting at number 64 upon its release in August 1969.

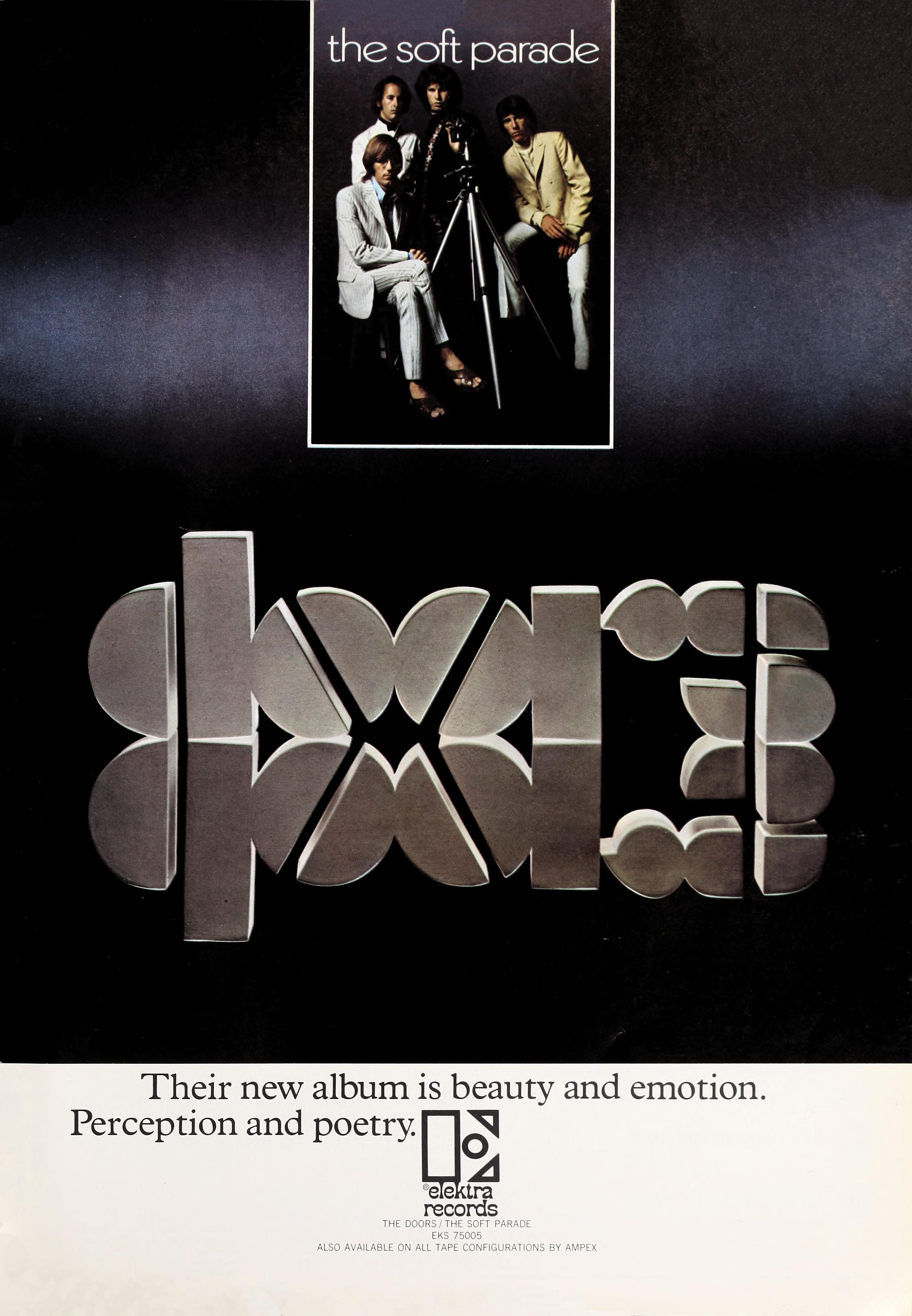
Cashbox advertisement, July 26, 1969

The album was rejected by the group's original audience and the underground scene, particularly for the use of horns and strings. The underground press was less than complimentary, with David Walkey, writing in New York's East Village Other, stating the album was "badly messed up by the syrupy arrangement of Paul Rothchild and could be renamed, 'The Rothchild Strings Play the Doors'." Another scathing review by Miller Francis Jr. of The Great Speckled Bird expressed disdain for what he felt was "a misfire in poetic Art Rock", feeling The Soft Parade "comes on so fucking pretentious, like something written rather than something sung." Rob Cline of Northwest Passage questioned why a band like the Doors needed to record with violins and trombones when the group was "best when getting it on straight and hard as witness to their first two albums". In Rolling Stone, Alec Dubro found much of the songs to be "pale shadows of their earlier works". Jazz and Pop magazine analyst Patricia Keneally, on the other hand, praised the band's experimentation, claiming, "most of it is very superior music and some is absolutely glorious". Reviewing for The Village Voice in January 1970, Robert Christgau wrote: "This is an acceptable record, with predictable pretensions and two or three first-rate songs ('Touch Me,' 'Wild Child'). Nothing to get excited about, either way."

Writer Richard Riegel evaluated the immediate impact of The Soft Parade on the Doors' reputation in the magazine Creem in 1981: "If Waiting for the Sun set a lot of older hippies to questioning their former perceptions of the Doors as Avatars of the avant-garde, then The Soft Parade finished off their interest in the group." In a review for AllMusic, Richie Unterberger was slightly more positive, writing that "about half the record is quite good, especially the huge hit 'Touch Me' (their most successful integration of orchestration)". However, Unterberger felt it is the "weakest studio album recorded with Jim Morrison", as well as "their weakest set of material, low lights including filler like 'Do It' and 'Runnin' Blue'." Writer James Riordan opined that, compared to prior albums, Morrison's contributions to The Soft Parade were lackluster, putting his credibility as a serious poet and songwriter on the line. Author Danny Sugerman in No One Here Gets Out Alive wrote "overall the lyric impact was less than it had been on previous albums ... horns by some of the top local studio jazz musicians further blurred the once-lucid Doors sound". MusicHound Rock editors Gary Graff and Daniel Durcholz described the album as "uneven", but also expressed that it "tends toward the great and includes some of the band's most ambitious, original material."

=== Reissues ===
In 1988, The Soft Parade was digitally remastered by Bruce Botnick and Paul A. Rothchild at Digital Magnetics, using the original master tapes. It was remastered again in 1999 for The Complete Studio Recordings box set by Bernie Grundman and Botnick at Bernie Grundman Mastering, using 96khz/24bit technology; it was also released as a standalone CD release. In 2006, the album was reissued on a CD/DVD set featuring the 2006 stereo and 5.1 remixes done by Botnick for the Perception box set, and it includes a clip of the Doors performing the title track live. The 2006 stereo remix was also released on a standalone CD release in 2007 with six bonus tracks including the rarities "Whisky, Mystics, and Men" and "Push Push"; this edition was mastered by Botnick at Uniteye. In 2009, it was reissued on 180g vinyl featuring the original mix, which was cut by Grundman. The same year, Audio Fidelity reissued the album on 24kt gold CD, remastered by Steve Hoffman. However, this edition was criticized due to the use of limiting and compression applied during mastering, despite it being advertised as maintaining the original dynamic range of the recording.

Analogue Productions reissued the album on hybrid SACD (2013) and double 45 RPM vinyl (2012); both editions were mastered by Doug Sax and Sangwook Nam at The Mastering Lab. The CD layer of the Super Audio CD contains the original stereo mix while the SACD layer contains Botnick's 2006 5.1 surround mix. In 2019, Rhino Records released a 1-LP/3-CD deluxe edition to commemorate the album's 50th anniversary release, which was remastered by Botnick, utilizing the Plangent Process. The CDs are encoded with MQA technology. It included the namely "Doors only" versions of "Tell All the People", "Touch Me", "Runnin' Blue" and "Wishful Sinful", where the orchestral arrangements are removed and features some new overdubbed guitar parts by Krieger.

== Track listing ==
The 40th Anniversary edition includes a longer version of "The Soft Parade", running to over 9:41 length. However, the liner notes of the original US Elektra Records album released on July 18, 1969, show the details as listed below:

Side one
No.	Title	Writer(s)	Length
1.	"Tell All the People"	Robby Krieger	3:24
2.	"Touch Me"	Krieger	3:15
3.	"Shaman's Blues"	Jim Morrison	4:45
4.	"Do It"	Morrison; Krieger	3:01
5.	"Easy Ride"	Morrison	2:35

Side two
No.	Title	Writer(s)	Length
1.	"Wild Child"	Morrison	2:36
2.	"Runnin' Blue"	Krieger	2:27
3.	"Wishful Sinful"	Krieger	2:56
4.	"The Soft Parade"	Morrison	8:40

40th Anniversary bonus tracks
No.	Title	Writer(s)	Length
10.	"Who Scared You"	Morrison, Krieger	3:58
11.	"Whiskey, Mystics and Men" (Version 1)	Morrison, the Doors	2:28
12.	"Whiskey, Mystics and Men" (Version 2)	Morrison, the Doors	3:04
13.	"Push Push" (Jam)	the Doors	6:05
14.	"Touch Me" (Dialogue)		0:28
15.	"Touch Me" (Take 3)	Krieger	3:40

50th Anniversary / second CD bonus tracks
No.	Title	Writer(s)	Length
10.	"Who Scared You"	Morrison, Krieger	3:55
11.	"Tell All the People" (Doors-only mix)	Krieger	3:23
12.	"Touch Me" (Doors-only mix with new Krieger overdub)	Krieger	3:12
13.	"Runnin' Blue" (Doors-only mix with new Krieger overdub)	Krieger	2:29
14.	"Wishful Sinful" (Doors-only mix with new Krieger overdub)	Krieger	2:57
15.	"Who Scared You" (Doors-only mix)	Morrison, Krieger	3:18
16.	"Roadhouse Blues" (Manzarek on vocals)	Morrison, the Doors	5:28
17.	"(You Need Meat) Don't Go No Further" (Manzarek on vocals)	Willie Dixon	4:29
18.	"I'm Your Doctor" (Manzarek on vocals)	St. Louis Jimmy Oden	3:56
19.	"Touch Me" (Doors-only mix)	Krieger	3:13
20.	"Runnin' Blue" (Doors-only mix)	Krieger	2:29
21.	"Wishful Sinful" (Doors-only mix)	Krieger	2:57

50th Anniversary / third CD bonus tracks
No.	Title	Writer(s)	Length
22.	"I Am Troubled"	Morrison	0:39
23.	"Seminary School (a.k.a. Petition the Lord With Prayer)"	Morrison	2:19
24.	"Rock Is Dead" (Complete version)		1:04:04
25.	"Chaos"		3:06

== Personnel ==
Details are taken from the 2019 Rhino Records CD 50th Anniversary Edition liner notes with accompanying essays by Bruce Botnick and David Fricke and may differ from other sources.

The Doors

- Jim Morrison – vocals
- Ray Manzarek – keyboards
- Robby Krieger – guitar, chorus lead vocals on "Runnin' Blue"
- John Densmore – drums

Additional musicians

- Harvey Brooks – bass guitar on "Tell All the People", "Touch Me", "Shaman's Blues", "Do It", "Runnin' Blue" and "The Soft Parade"
- Doug Lubahn – bass guitar on "Easy Ride", "Wild Child" and "Wishful Sinful"
- Paul Harris – orchestral arrangements
- Curtis Amy – saxophone solos
- George Bohanon – trombone solo
- Champ Webb – English horn solo
- Jesse McReynolds – mandolin on "Runnin' Blue"
- Reinol Andino – congas

Technical

- Paul A. Rothchild – production
- Bruce Botnick – engineering
- Joel Brodsky – photography
- Peter Schaumann – inside illustration
- William S. Harvey – art direction and design

== Charts ==
=== Album ===
Chart	Year	Peak
Billboard 200	1969	6

=== Singles ===
Year	Single (A-side / B-side)	Chart	Peak
1968	"Touch Me" / "Wild Child"	Billboard Hot 100	3
1969	"Wishful Sinful" / "Who Scared You"	Hot 100	44
1969	"Tell All the People" / "Easy Ride"	Hot 100	57
1969	"Runnin' Blue" / "Do It"	Hot 100	64

== Certifications ==
Region	Certification	Certified units/sales
Australia (ARIA)	Gold	35,000^{^}
Canada (Music Canada)	Platinum	100,000^{^}
United Kingdom (BPI)	Silver	60,000^{*}
United States (RIAA)	Platinum	1,000,000^{^}
^{*} Sales figures based on certification alone.^{^} Shipments figures based on certification alone.

== See also ==
- Outline of the Doors
