= The Crystal Ship =

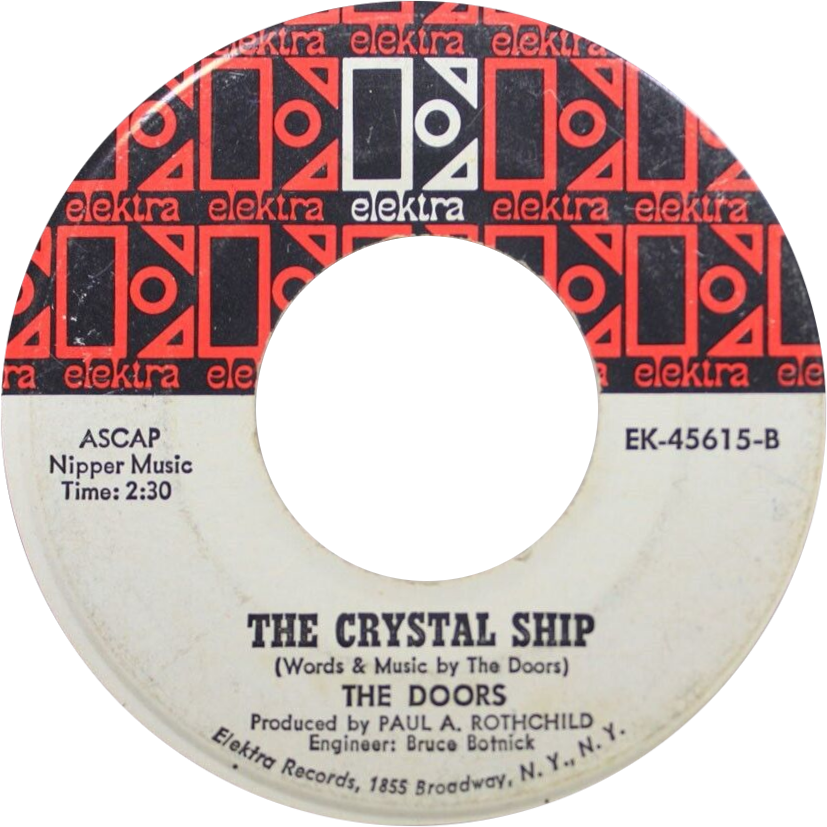
- Side B of the original US single

Single by the Doors

from the album The Doors
- A-side: "Light My Fire"
- Released: April 1967
- Recorded: August 1966
- Genre: Psychedelia
- Length: 2:30
- Label: Elektra
- Songwriter: The Doors
- Producer: Paul A. Rothchild

The Doors singles chronology
| "Break On Through (To the Other Side)" (1967) | "Light My Fire" / "The Crystal Ship" (1967) | "People Are Strange" (1967) |

"The Crystal Ship" is a song by the American rock band the Doors, from their 1967 debut album The Doors, and the B-side of the number-one hit single "Light My Fire". It was composed as a love song to Jim Morrison's first serious girlfriend, Mary Werbelow, shortly after their relationship ended.

The song borrows elements from baroque music. The lyrics in the opening verse resemble a conventional love song, while the later verses are vague in intention and contain more challenging imagery. A music video was later compiled from footage of the band performing on American Bandstand, coupled with film of Morrison and Pamela Courson at Kern River, near Bakersfield, California.

== Lyrics and recording ==
Morrison's lyrics are often deliberately vague, and this, coupled with the song's dreamlike atmosphere, has led to speculation as to the meaning of "The Crystal Ship". According to Greil Marcus, the opening lines "Before you slip into unconsciousness, I'd like to have another kiss" could be about "sleep, it could be an overdose, inflicted by the singer or the person he's addressing; it could be murder suicide, or a suicide pact." Critic James Perone noted that the song's title is open to wide interpretations, and that the crystal ship "could just as easily represent sleep as a drug trip". He conceded that "in 1967 the latter would probably have been the more common interpretation". Authors David Luhrssen and Michael Larson formulate in their book that sex could be expressed as "the lucid dream of 'The Crystal Ship'."

A January 1990 letter to the Los Angeles Times claimed that the song was about crystal methamphetamine, with the ship representing a hypodermic needle, and the kiss the act of drug injection. John Densmore responded by saying that although Morrison was aware that "crystal" is slang for methedrine, he "wrote 'The Crystal Ship' for Mary Werbelow, a girlfriend with whom he was breaking up: it was therefore intended as a goodbye love song." According to Rolling Stone critic Narendra Kusnur, the lines "The days are bright and filled with pain, enclose me in your gentle rain, the time you ran was too insane, we'll meet again, we'll meet again" reflect the breakup.

Inspired by William Blake's poem The Crystal Cabinet, it is one of many of Morrison's songs inspired by Blake's poetry. Portion of the lyrics is suggested that borrows from the 12th-century Irish Lebor na hUidre (Book of the Dun Cow) manuscript. According to local Santa Barbara, California, lore, Morrison wrote the song after taking LSD on an Isla Vista beach one night as he stared at the blinking lights of an offshore oil rig named Platform Holly.

=== Recording ===
The track was recorded during an evening recording session on September 22, 1966 at Sunset Sound Recorders. The group also recorded "Back Door Man" earlier that same day.

== Reception ==
Critics Richie Unterberger, Samb Hicks and Jennifer Dempsey have declared "The Crystal Ship" as one of the great band performances of The Doors. Kusnur considered it one of Morrison's 10 most underrated songs, particularly praising his soulful vocal performance and "[Ray] Manzarek's steady keyboard interlude and the song's gradual build-up." Michael Nelson of PopMatters also wrote that the song "boasts one of Morrison's best vocal performances". Cash Box called it a "slow rocker with an imaginative lyric." BBC Music lauded it one of the "glittering" gems of the album.

Louder Sound ranked "The Crystal Ship" the 14th best Doors track, while The Guardian placed it second on their 2015 list, only behind "Light My Fire".

== Personnel ==
Per The Doors album liner notes:

- Jim Morrison – vocals
- Ray Manzarek – organ, piano
- Robby Krieger – guitar
- John Densmore – drums
