= Wishful Sinful =

- Denmark picture sleeve

Single by the Doors

from the album The Soft Parade
- B-side: "Who Scared You"
- Released: March 1969
- Recorded: July 26 & November 20–21, 1968
- Studio: Elektra Sound Recorders, Hollywood, California
- Genre: Chamber rock; baroque pop
- Length: 2:55
- Label: Elektra
- Songwriter: Robby Krieger
- Producer: Paul A. Rothchild

The Doors singles chronology
"Touch Me" (1968)	"Wishful Sinful" (1969)	"Tell All the People" (1969)

"Wishful Sinful" is a song by American rock band the Doors. Group guitarist Robby Krieger wrote the tune, which was first released in March 1969 as a single, as well as on the band's fourth album, The Soft Parade, later in July. "Wishful Sinful" follows the general theme of the album by incorporating elements of classical music.

In April 1969, the single reached No. 44 on the U.S. Billboard Hot 100 chart and No. 28 on the Cash Box Top 100 chart. In Denmark, it peaked at No. 3, where it stayed in the Top 10 for a month.

== Lyrics and music ==
The song's lyrics were written by guitarist Robby Krieger, who confirmed that he "tried to get in the subconscious mind" with the lyrics to the song. On the other hand, Doors keyboardist Ray Manzarek interpreted the song as just being about "love and sex", while music journalist Gillian G. Gaar described the lyrics as being simply "romantic".

Aside from the lyricism, the accompaniments of "Wishful Sinful" are string instruments, featuring an English horn solo. This musical presence have been the subject of many characterizations, with Eduardo Rivadavia defining it as "chamber rock" while Rolling Stone India critic Narendra Kusnur suggesting it could also be considered to be "baroque pop." The Doors FAQ author Richie Weidman describes it as a "crooning Frank Sinatra–type ballad" and Kusnur also suggests that it reflects Sinatra's influence. Bass guitar was provided by either two session musicians: Harvey Brooks, or Doug Lubahn.

== Critical reception ==
Cash Box described "Wishful Sinful" as being "softer, a good deal sweeter and far less controversial" than previous Doors' singles, stating that the song "spotlights Jim Morrison's vocal and a brilliant arrangement." Ultimate Classic Rock critic Nick DeRiso described "Wishful Sinful" as being "entangled in gauzy classical themes," expressing surprise that it nearly made the Top 40 despite that. Fellow Ultimate Classic Rock critic Eduardo Rivadavia ranked it as Krieger's fifth best Doors song. Rivadavia claimed that it came closest of any song on Soft Parade "to capturing the Doors’ vision for densely orchestrated chamber-rock," because the hooks in the refrain work well with both the "ornate" symphonic arrangement and the Doors' own rock music instruments. Kusnur considered it one of Morrison's 10 most underrated songs, stating that "Morrison's rendition of the lines, 'Wishful, sinful, our love is beautiful to see; I know where I would like to be, right back where I came' have been considered to be a work of genius."

In a moderate album review of The Soft Parade, Sal Cinquemani of Slant Magazine commented that "Wishful Sinful" sounds like "something from one of the Doors' early albums", while writing that Jim Morrison's vocal performance is "less than genuine and it's clear the strains of substance abuse were beginning to wear on his voice greatly." AllMusic critic Richie Unterberger described the song along with "Tell All the People" as an "uncharacteristically wistful" tune that was "not all that good, and not sung very convincingly by [Jim] Morrison."

"Wishful Sinful" is mentioned in Ian Rankin's crime novel The Hanging Garden (1998).

== Charts ==
Chart (1969)	Peak position
Denmark (IFPI)	3
US Billboard Hot 100	44
US Cash Box Top 100	28
