= Touch Me (The Doors song) =

1968 single by The Doors

Single by the Doors

from the album The Soft Parade
- B-side: "Wild Child"
- Released: December 1968
- Recorded: November 14 & 20–21, 1968
- Studio: Elektra Sound Recorders, Los Angeles
- Genre: Soul; proto-prog; symphonic rock
- Length: 3:11
- Label: Elektra
- Songwriter: Robby Krieger
- Producer: Paul A. Rothchild

The Doors singles chronology
"Hello, I Love You" (1968)	"Touch Me" (1968)	"Wishful Sinful" (1969)

Official audio
- "Touch Me" on YouTube

"Touch Me" is a song by the Doors from their 1969 album The Soft Parade. Written by guitarist Robby Krieger in late 1968, it makes extensive use of brass and string instruments, including a solo by featured saxophonist Curtis Amy.

It was released as a single in December 1968 and reached No. 3 on the Billboard Hot 100 (their last Top Ten hit in the US) and No. 1 in the Cashbox Top 100 in early 1969 (the band's third American number-one single). The single peaked at No. 1 in the RPM Canadian Singles Chart. However, despite the band's commercial success the previous year, "Touch Me" did not chart in the UK Singles Chart. It was also certified Platinum by the RIAA in November 2024 for reaching 2,000,000 digital units.

== Composition ==
According to Bruce Botnick's liner notes, the song was referred to by various working titles; "I'm Gonna Love You", from a line in the chorus, and "Hit Me", a reference to blackjack. The opening line was originally "C'mon, hit me ... I'm not afraid", the line thus reflecting the first person vantage point of a blackjack player. Lead singer Jim Morrison changed the lyric out of concern that rowdy crowds at their live shows would mistakenly believe that "hit me" was a challenge to physically assault him. At the end of the song, Morrison can be heard shouting "stronger than dirt", which was a slogan from an Ajax commercial.

Billboard described the single as having "all the drive and rhythm of their No. 1 winner 'Hello, I Love You'," stating that "the Doors have a smash follow-up here." Cash Box described it as "a marvelous track" in which the Doors "add a helping of beat to their hard-hitting style."

=== Musical style and structure ===
Touch Me
A 23-second sample of "Touch Me".

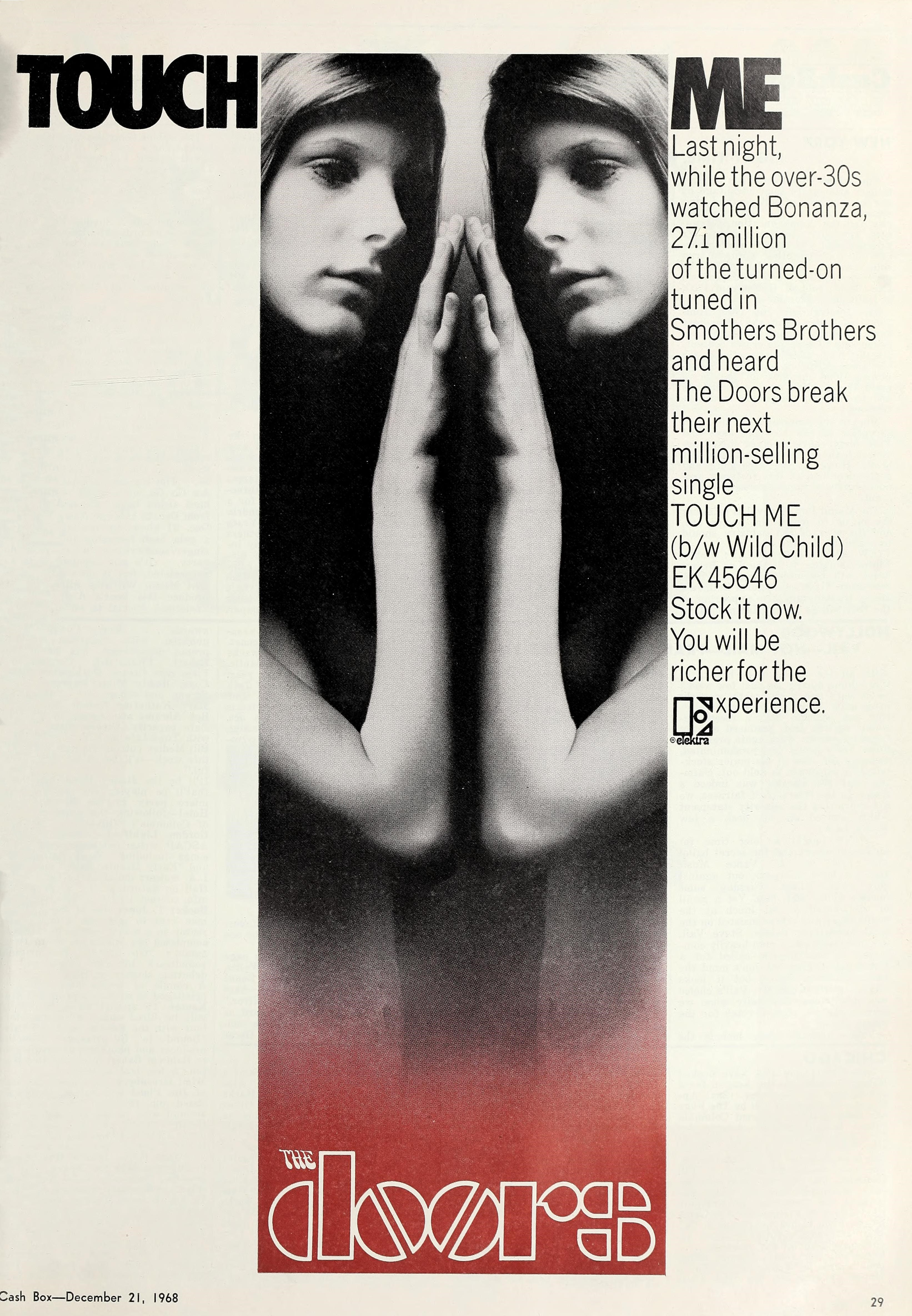
Cashbox advertisement, December 21, 1968

"Touch Me" incorporates influences from traditional pop music. The introduction is notated in the key of Bb minor with a 4/4 time signature. The song's writer, Robby Krieger, interpolated the guitar riff from the 1967 Four Seasons song "C'mon Marianne". The track's last section piece includes a jazz-inflected saxophone solo played by Curtis Amy. In a 1970 interview with Downbeat Magazine, Morrison reported that he was proud that "Touch Me" was "the first rock hit to have a jazz solo in it".

The raw track was recorded on November 14, 1968. The horn overdubbing took place on November 20, and the string overdubbing was a day later.

In the book A to X of Alternative Music, "Touch Me" was described as a "solid gold soul classic". Writing for AllMusic, critic Jason Elias wrote that the song has "the style of pop and pure lounge." Some critics suggested the track blends pop with psychedelic rock; a combination which was unique at the time. It has also been characterized, along with other album tracks, as an early attempt at progressive rock.

== Other version ==
"Touch Me" was remixed with added bass and compression and this version appeared on a 1974 compilation called Heavy Metal released via Warner Bros. Special Products.

== In other media ==
The song was released as one of the first downloadable songs for Rock Band 3, along with several other songs by the band.

== Personnel ==
The Doors

- Jim Morrison – lead vocals
- Ray Manzarek – Gibson Kalamazoo organ, celesta
- Robby Krieger – guitar
- John Densmore – drums

Additional personnel

- Paul Harris – orchestral arrangements
- Curtis Amy – tenor saxophone (solo)
- Harvey Brooks – bass guitar

== Charts ==
=== Weekly charts ===
Chart (1968–1969)	Peak position
Canadian RPM Top Singles	1
Finland (Soumen Virallinen)	23
New Zealand (Listener)	6
South Africa (Springbok)	7
U.S. Billboard Hot 100	3
U.S. Cash Box Top 100	1

=== Year-end charts ===
Chart (1969)	Rank
Canada	23
US Billboard Hot 100	49
US Cash Box	18

== Certifications ==
Region	Certification	Certified units/sales
United States (RIAA)	Platinum	2,000,000^{^}
^{‡} Sales+streaming figures based on certification alone.
