= Bruce Botnick =

American audio engineer

- Born: 1945 (age 80–81); Los Angeles, California, US
- Occupations: Audio engineer, record producer
- Years active: 1963–present
- Notable work: L.A. Woman, Eddie Money, Life for the Taking, Street Talk, Let It Bleed, Pet Sounds

Bruce Botnick (born 1945) is an American audio engineer and record producer. He is best known for co-producing L.A. Woman, the sixth studio album by the Doors, after producer Paul A. Rothchild quit during its production. Botnick is also known for producing for Eddie Money and his platinum albums Eddie Money and Life for the Taking as well as Steve Perry's platinum album Street Talk. Botnick also engineered for the Beach Boys and their eleventh studio album Pet Sounds as well as producing and engineering for acts such as Love, Buffalo Springfield, Dave Mason, the Supremes, Marvin Gaye, the Rolling Stones plus film composer Jerry Goldsmith.

== Early work ==
Botnick engineered Love's first two albums, and co-produced their third album, Forever Changes, with the band's singer-songwriter, Arthur Lee. He also is listed as the one of two recording engineers on the 1965 Curtis Amy LP The Sounds of Broadway - The Sounds of Hollywood - said to have been released in 1965, although it also has been said to have been released earlier. The LP back cover liner notes, written by Curtis Amy, formally thank Bruce Botnick for his work on the recordings.

== The Doors ==
Botnick audio engineered the Doors' studio recordings starting with their first album in 1966.

In November 1970 he took over production of The Doors' L.A. Woman album, their last with lead singer Jim Morrison, after the band's long-serving producer Paul A. Rothchild clashed with the band over the album's direction. According to Robby Krieger, it was Botnick's idea to record the album at the Doors rehearsal space where they were more comfortable and used to the sound, rather than at a more costly recording studio.

== Additional work ==
Botnick has a credit as assistant engineer on the Rolling Stones' Let It Bleed album. He later produced Eddie Money's first two albums, Eddie Money in 1977 and Life for the Taking in 1978. Botnick also produced two albums for Paul Collins' rock group The Beat, including 1979's The Beat and 1982's The Kids Are The Same. He also co-produced Kenny Loggins’ 1982 album, High Adventure.

Botnick had a long-running association with film composer Jerry Goldsmith as his scoring mixer. Botnick first met Goldsmith on 1979's Star Trek: The Motion Picture and they worked together on most of Goldsmith's film projects – numbering over 100 – from the 1980s through to Goldsmith's death in 2004.

He also engineered at least two of Lonnie Mack's late-1960s Elektra albums, and is credited as Re-Recording Mixer for the movie Gremlins.

Botnick was the producer and mixing engineer of the 1972 album Rising by the band Mark-Almond.
