= Paul A. Rothchild =

American music producer (1935-1995)

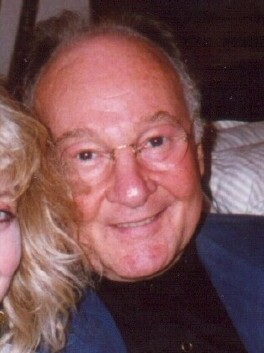
- Rothchild in 1994

Background information
- Born: Paul Allen Rothchild; April 18, 1935; Brooklyn, New York, United States
- Died: March 30, 1995 (aged 59) Hollywood, California, United States
- Genres: Rock; folk; pop
- Occupation: Producer
- Years active: c. 1960–1995

Paul Allen Rothchild (April 18, 1935 – March 30, 1995) was a prominent American record producer of the 1960s and 1970s, widely known for his historic work with the Doors, producing Janis Joplin's final album Pearl and the Paul Butterfield Blues Band's first two albums.

== Life and career ==
=== Early years ===
Born in Brooklyn, Rothchild grew up in Teaneck, New Jersey and graduated from Teaneck High School in 1954. He had a musical family; his mother was an opera singer, and Rothchild studied classical music conducting.

Rothchild began his career on the Boston folk scene, recording and releasing recordings (sometimes on his own label, Mount Auburn Records), by local folk artists, including the Charles River Valley Boys. He became a house producer for Jac Holzman's Elektra Records label in 1964; he worked extensively with noted recording engineers Bruce Botnick, John Haeny, Fritz Richmond, and William Gazecki.

In late 1964, Rothchild discovered Paul Butterfield and his band. A first attempt at recording them was shelved (though later released in the 1990s) but a later effort resulted in the band's self-titled debut release, The Paul Butterfield Blues Band. Rothchild also produced the band's second album, East-West, one of the most influential albums of the 1960s and the first example of what became acid rock. The early Butterfield Blues Band members were inducted into the Rock and Roll Hall of Fame in 2015.

=== Career ===
By the mid-1960s, Rothchild was established in the Los Angeles music scene, and his house on Lookout Mountain in Laurel Canyon was inhabited by many of the future musical superstars of the 1960s and 1970s. He produced the original song demo of Crosby, Stills, & Nash that landed the group a recording contract (it was actually Crosby, Stills and John Sebastian on the recording, with Sebastian later replaced by Graham Nash). Rothchild originated the concept "LEDO" (Leadered / Equalized / Dolby / Original). This format ensured the final tape would represent Rothchild's sonic vision for future generations. Nash reported in his autobiography Wild Tales: A Rock & Roll Life, that it was this experience that led Crosby Stills and Nash to decide that they didn't need a producer, and that Joni Mitchell's later experience with Rothchild also convinced her to produce her own work.

Rothchild is perhaps best known as the producer of the first five albums by the Doors. He did not produce their last album with Jim Morrison, L.A. Woman, having withdrawn from the project after disagreeing with the group over the band's musical direction. He also produced albums and singles for John Sebastian, Joni Mitchell, Neil Young, Tom Paxton, Fred Neil, Tom Rush, the Lovin' Spoonful, Tim Buckley, Love, Clear Light, Rhinoceros and Janis Joplin, including her final LP Pearl and her only no. 1 single (written by her then-lover Kris Kristofferson) "Me and Bobby McGee".

In the 1970s, he produced the first two albums for the Tampa band Outlaws, for Arista Records, as well as producing Bonnie Raitt, Elliott Murphy and the soundtrack album for the Bette Midler film The Rose, which was loosely based on the life of Janis Joplin. He also produced the soundtrack to Oliver Stone's film The Doors, and appeared in a small role in the film in which he was played by Canadian actor Michael Wincott.

== Death ==
In 1990, Rothchild was diagnosed with lung cancer. He died in 1995, aged 59.

== See also ==
- Outline of the Doors
