= The Doors discography =

Cataloging of published recordings by The Doors

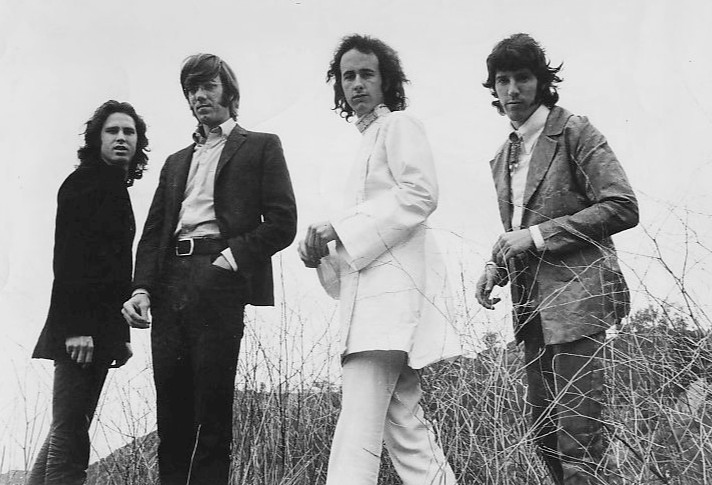
- The Doors in late 1969
- Studio albums: 9
- Soundtrack albums: 2
- Live albums: 5
- Compilation albums: 22
- Singles: 27
- Videos: 24
- Box sets: 11
- Archive albums: 28

The following is the discography of the American rock band the Doors. Formed in Los Angeles in 1965, the group consisted of Jim Morrison (vocals), Ray Manzarek (keyboards), John Densmore (drums), and Robby Krieger (guitar). The Doors became one of the most popular rock bands of their era. Their debut album, The Doors (1967), released by Elektra Records, charted at No. 2 on the US Billboard 200 and produced the group's most successful single, "Light My Fire". The album received several sales certifications including a five times multi-platinum from the Recording Industry Association of America (RIAA), and a four time multi-platinum from Music Canada (MC). The Doors' second studio album, Strange Days (1967), sold well commercially but did not reach the same level of success as the debut, and failed to produce a major hit single. It reached No. 3 on the Billboard 200 and was certified platinum in the United States and Canada. The Doors' third studio album Waiting for the Sun (1968), was commercially very successful, reaching No. 1 in the US and France, and produced their second No. 1 single, "Hello, I Love You". Waiting for the Sun was the first Doors album to chart in the United Kingdom, where it peaked inside the Top 20. The album was certified gold in that country by the British Phonographic Industry (BPI), as well as being certified gold and platinum in several other countries.

For the fourth studio album The Soft Parade (1969), the Doors chose to incorporate string and brass instruments into a number of their songs. The band was criticized by many for this, and referred to as "pop sellouts" and having "gone soft". Despite this, The Soft Parade became the band's fourth straight Top 10 album and it produced their third most successful single, "Touch Me". The album was certified platinum in both the US and Canada. To counter the artistic criticism of their last two albums the Doors next released Morrison Hotel (1970). The blues-heavy LP was a critical and commercial success. Although only having produced one single, which did not perform well on the charts, Morrison Hotel became another Top 10 album for the band and was certified platinum in the US, Canada, and in France, by the Syndicat national de l'édition phonographique (SNEP). The group next released Absolutely Live (1970), a live album containing snippets of performances edited together from fourteen different concerts recorded in nine different cities in 1969 and 1970. Absolutely Live was well received and charted in the Top 10 in the US and Canada and was certified gold in both countries. L.A. Woman (1971), was the final Doors album with singer Jim Morrison, who died in Paris shortly after the album's release. The album was praised by critics and a commercial success, it landed inside the Top 10 in the US and Canada and produced two singles, "Love Her Madly" and "Riders on the Storm". Like Morrison Hotel before it, L.A. Woman relied very heavily on the blues, which was a genre of music the Doors had often incorporated into their early live sets while the house band at the London Fog, a nightclub on the Sunset Strip, in Los Angeles. L.A. Woman was certified gold and platinum in several different countries.

After the death of Morrison, the three remaining Doors members released two more studio albums before they eventually disbanded, Other Voices (1971), and Full Circle (1972). Both albums appeared on the US and Canadian albums charts, and likewise both produced charting singles, but the success was limited and the three sought solo ventures. Five years later, Manzarek, Krieger, and Densmore reunited to record backing tracks over Morrison's spoken word poetry, and released The Doors' ninth and final studio album titled, An American Prayer (1978). Morrison had recorded the poetry in separate sessions in 1969 and 1970. Upon release, the album received mixed reviews, but was commercially successful and was awarded platinum status in the US by the RIAA.

The use of the Doors song "The End", from their debut album, in the popular Vietnam War film, Apocalypse Now in 1979 and the release of the first compilation album in seven years, Greatest Hits, released in the fall of 1980, created a resurgence in the Doors. Due to those two events, an entirely new audience, too young to have known of the band earlier, began listening and purchasing the band's music. The group's popularity continued to increase. In the 1980s, the band released concert films, and live and compilation albums to much commercial success. In 1991, The Doors, a feature film about the band, directed by Academy Award winning director Oliver Stone, that starred Val Kilmer as Morrison, was released, which helped to expand the Doors' popularity to another audience. When You're Strange, is a 2009 documentary about The Doors written and directed by Tom DiCillo and narrated by Johnny Depp. It was nominated for an Emmy Award for Outstanding Nonfiction Series and won a Grammy Award for Best Long Form Video. The band continues to release compilations through Rhino Records and new live material through both Rhino and their Bright Midnight Archives label.

== Albums ==
=== Studio albums ===
List of studio albums, with selected chart positions, sales figures and certifications
Title	Album details	Peak chart positions											Certifications
Title	Album details	US	AUS^{[A]}	AUT	CAN^{[B]}	FRA	GER	ITA	NLD	NOR	SWE	UK	Certifications
The Doors	Released: January 4, 1967; Record label: Elektra	2	—	6^{[C]}	42^{[D]}	3^{[C]}	43	51^{[E]}	—	4^{[C]}	24^{[C]}	43^{[C]}	RIAA: 5× Platinum; BPI: 2× Platinum; BVMI: Platinum; FIMI: Platinum; IFPI AUT: Gold; IFPI SWE: Platinum; MC: 4× Platinum; PROMUSICAE: Gold; SNEP: 3× Platinum
Strange Days	Released: September 25, 1967; Record label: Elektra	3	—	—	^{[F]}	10	—	—	—	—	—	—	RIAA: Platinum; BPI: Gold; BVMI: Gold; FIMI: Gold; MC: Platinum; SNEP: 2× Gold
Waiting for the Sun	Released: July 3, 1968; Record label: Elektra	1	—	—	3	1	20	—	—	—	—	16	RIAA: Platinum; BPI: Gold; BVMI: Gold; MC: Platinum; SNEP: 2× Gold
The Soft Parade	Released: July 21, 1969; Record label: Elektra	6	—	—	4	8	33	—	4	—	—	—	RIAA: Platinum; ARIA: Gold; BPI: Silver; MC: Platinum
Morrison Hotel	Released: February 9, 1970; Record label: Elektra	4	4	—	3	32^{[C]}	—	—	6	13	—	12	RIAA: Platinum; ARIA: 2× Platinum; BPI: Gold; FIMI: Gold; IFPI AUT: Gold; MC: Platinum; SNEP: Platinum
L.A. Woman	Released: April 19, 1971; Record label: Elektra	9	9	—	11	4^{[C]}	—	—	1	15	—	28	RIAA: 3× Platinum; ARIA: 4× Platinum; BPI: Platinum; BVMI: Gold; FIMI: Gold; IFPI AUT: Gold; MC: 3× Platinum; SNEP: 2× Platinum
Other Voices	Released: October 18, 1971; Record label: Elektra	31	—	—	36	—	—	—	—	—	—	—	
Full Circle	Released: July 17, 1972; Record label: Elektra	68	—	—	26	—	—	—	—	—	—	—	
An American Prayer	Released: November 27, 1978; Record label: Elektra	54	80	—	—	—	79	—	—	27	—	—	RIAA: Platinum
"—" denotes releases that did not chart or are unknown.

Notes

- A:Australian chart positions for studio albums are as follows: Morrison Hotel, L.A. Woman, An American Prayer. Note: In Australia, albums and singles charting prior to 1974 were published by pop music newspaper Go-Set. All charts published subsequent to this date, until 1998, were the work of David Kent for the Kent Music Report.
- B:Canadian chart positions for studio albums are as follows: The Doors, Waiting for the Sun, The Soft Parade, Morrison Hotel, L.A. Woman, Other Voices, Full Circle.
- C:Did not appear on charts until 1991. In France, those noted as [C] first appeared on the charts in 1991, but achieved their peak status at a later date. The Doors peaked in 2002, Morrison Hotel in 2005, and L.A. Woman in 2003.
- D:Canadian chart position for The Doors is most likely not a peak position but rather a re-entry position as this date is 19 months after the release of the album. Due to this being the earliest date that RPM "Top Albums" charts are published online by Library and Archives Canada, all "Top Albums" charts preceding this particular one are unavailable for viewing.
- E:Did not appear on charts until 2005.
- F:Strange Days most likely attained a charting position in Canada. The earliest RPM "Top Albums" chart available for viewing is 53 weeks after the release of Strange Days, consequently making any chart appearances the album may have had unknown.

=== Live albums ===
Title	Album details	Peak chart positions											Certifications
Title	Album details	US	AUS	AUT	CAN^{[G]}	FRA	GER	NLD	NZ	SWE	SWI	UK	Certifications
Absolutely Live	Released: July 20, 1970; Record label: Elektra	8	20	—	10	—	—	—	—	—	—	69	RIAA: Gold; ARIA: Gold; MC: Gold; SNEP: Gold
Alive, She Cried	Released: October 17, 1983; Record label: Elektra	23	—	—	20	14	—	33	36	39	—	36	RIAA: Gold; MC: Gold
Live at the Hollywood Bowl	Released: May 1987; Record label: Elektra	154	—	—	86	—	—	—	—	—	—	51	
In Concert	Released: May 21, 1991; Record label: Elektra	50	34	6	—	35	12	46	45	—	23	24	RIAA: Platinum; BPI: Silver; MC: Gold; SNEP: Gold
Message to Love: The Isle of Wight Festival 1970	Released: October 29, 1996; Record label: Legacy												
"—" denotes releases that did not chart or are unknown.

=== Compilation albums ===
Title	Album details	Peak chart positions												Certifications
Title	Album details	US	AUS	AUT	BEL	CAN^{[H]}	SPA	FRA	GER	NLD	SWE	SWI	UK	Certifications
13	Released: November 30, 1970; Record label: Elektra	25	—	—	—	21	—	—	—	—	—	—	—	RIAA: Platinum; MC: Platinum
Weird Scenes Inside the Gold Mine	Released: January 24, 1972; Record label: Elektra	55	—	—	—	34	—	—	—	—	—	—	50	RIAA: Gold
The Best of The Doors	Released: September 10, 1973; Record label: Elektra	158	—	—	—	—	—	—	—	—	—	—	—	
Star Collection	Released: April 1975; Record label: WEA	—	—	—	—	—	—	—	—	—	—	—	—	
Star Collection 2	Released: August 1975; Record label: WEA	—	—	—	—	—	—	—	—	—	—	—	—	
Greatest Hits	Released: October 13, 1980; Record label: Elektra	17	—	—	—	23	—	—	—	—	—	—	—	RIAA: 3× Platinum; MC: 2× Platinum; SNEP: Gold
The Doors Classics	Released: May 1985; Record label: Elektra	124	—	—	—	—	—	9	—	—	—	—	—	
The Best of the Doors	Released: July 20, 1985; Record label: Elektra	32	17	4	95	—	—	—	—	14	—	4	9	RIAA: Diamond (10× Platinum); ARIA: 4× Platinum; BPI: Platinum; IFPI FIN: Gold; IFPI NOR: Gold; IFPI SWI: Platinum; MC: 6× Platinum; SNEP: Platinum
Greatest Hits (Enhanced CD 1996)	Released: October 15, 1996; Record label: Elektra	—	—	—	19	—	—	—	57	—	—	—	185	RIAA: 4× Platinum; MC: 5× Platinum; ARIA: 2× Platinum; BPI: Silver
Essential Rarities	Released: June 20, 1999; Record label: Elektra	—	—	—	—	—	—	—	—	—	—	—	—	
The Best of the Doors^{[I]}	Released: December 5, 2000; Record label: WEA International	—	3	19	17	17	73	23	50	38	11	17	9	ARIA: 6× Platinum; BPI: Platinum; IFPI AUT: Gold; MC: Platinum
The Very Best of The Doors	Released: September 18, 2001; Record label: Rhino	92	—	—	—	—	—	—	—	—	—	—	—	
Legacy: The Absolute Best	Released: August 12, 2003; Record label: Elektra/Rhino	63	—	—	—	—	—	4	—	—	—	—	—	RIAA: Gold
The Very Best of The Doors^{[J]}	Released: March 25, 2007; Record label: Elektra/Rhino	113	25	16	10	12	49	8	81	12	49	36	15	RIAA: Gold; ARIA: 2× Platinum; FIMI: Platinum; BPI: Platinum
Scattered Sun	Released: 2007; Record label: Starbucks/Rhino	—	—	—	—	—	—	—	—	—	—	—	—	
The Future Starts Here: The Essential Doors Hits	Released: January 29, 2008; Record label: Elektra/Rhino	161	—	—	180	—	—	—	—	—	—	—	—	RIAA: Gold
The Platinum Collection^{[K]}	Released: April 15, 2008; Record label: Rhino	—	—	—	—	—	—	—	—	—	—	—	—	
Curated by RSD	Released: January 2, 2014; Record label: Record Store Day	—	—	—	—	—	—	—	—	—	—	—	—	
The Singles	Released: September 15, 2017; Record label: Elektra/Rhino	147	—	50	74	—	29	—	28	71	—	87	77	
Golden Album	Released: July 28, 2023; Record label: Elektra/Rhino		—			—		—			—			
Golden Doors Vol. 2	Released: July 25, 2025; Record label: Elektra/Rhino		—			—		—			—			
The Doors 1966	Released: November 27, 2026; Record label: Elektra/Rhino		—			—		—			—			
"—" denotes releases that did not chart or are unknown.

Notes

- G:Canadian chart positions for live albums are as follows: Absolutely Live, Alive, She Cried, Live at The Hollywood Bowl.
- H:Canadian chart positions for compilation albums are as follows: 13, Weird Scenes Inside the Goldmine, The Doors Greatest Hits, The Doors: Original Soundtrack Recording.
- I:This release also attained charting positions in the countries of Finland (9), Ireland (18).
- J:This release also attained charting positions in the countries of Denmark (12), Finland (17), Ireland (4), Italy (9), Mexico (50), New Zealand (16), Portugal (4).
- K:This release attained a charting position in the country of Greece (32).

=== Soundtracks ===
Title	Album details	Peak chart positions						Certifications
Title	Album details	US	AUS	AUT	CAN^{[H]}	GER	UK	Certifications
The Doors: Original Soundtrack Recording	Released: March 5, 1991; Record label: Elektra	8	11	4	9	6	11	US: Platinum; CAN: Platinum; SWI: Gold; SNEP: Platinum; BRA: Gold; GER: Gold; UK: Gold
When You're Strange: Music From The Motion Picture	Released: April 6, 2010; Record label: Rhino	156	—	—	—	—	—	
"—" denotes releases that did not chart or are unknown.

=== Archive albums ===
Title	Album details	Peak chart positions		
Title	Album details	US	ITA	SWI
The Bright Midnight Sampler	Released: September 25, 2000; Record label: Bright Midnight	—	—	—
Live in Detroit	Released: October 23, 2000; Record label: Bright Midnight	—	—	—
Bright Midnight: Live in America	Released: November 17, 2000; Record label: Bright Midnight	—	—	79
Live in Hollywood: Highlights from the Aquarius Theater Performances	Released: 2001; Record label: Bright Midnight	—	—	—
Live at the Aquarius Theatre: The First Performance	Released: September 13, 2001; Record label: Bright Midnight	—	—	—
Live at the Aquarius Theatre: The Second Performance	Released: 2001; Record label: Bright Midnight	—	—	—
No One Here Gets Out Alive	Released: December 2001; Record label: Bright Midnight	—	—	—
The Lost Interview Tapes Featuring Jim Morrison Volume One	Released: June 20, 2001; Record label: Bright Midnight	—	—	—
The Lost Interview Tapes Featuring Jim Morrison Volume Two	Released: January 23, 2002; Record label: Bright Midnight	—	—	—
Backstage and Dangerous: The Private Rehearsal	Released: January 23, 2002; Record label: Bright Midnight	—	—	—
Live in Hollywood	Released: May 2002; Record label: Bright Midnight	—	—	—
Boot Yer Butt: The Doors Bootlegs	Released: December, 2003; Record label: Bright Midnight	—	—	—
Live in Philadelphia '70	Released: November 29, 2005; Record label: Bright Midnight	—	—	—
Set the Night on Fire: The Doors Bright Midnight Archives Concerts	Released: November 14, 2006; Record label: Bright Midnight	—	—	—
Live in Boston	Released: July 24, 2007; Record label: Rhino	145	77	—
Live in Pittsburgh 1970	Released: March 4, 2008; Record label: Rhino	—	—	—
Live at the Matrix 1967	Released: November 18, 2008; Record label: Rhino	191	73	13
Live in New York	Released: November 17, 2009; Record label: Rhino	—	—	—
Live in Vancouver 1970	Released: November 22, 2010; Record label: Rhino	—	—	—
Live at the Bowl '68	Released: October 19, 2012; Record label: Rhino	—	—	—
Strange Nights of Stone: The Doors Bright Midnight Archives Concerts Vol. II	Released: October 19, 2013; Record label: Bright Midnight	—	—	—
London Fog 1966	Released: December 9, 2016; Record label: Rhino/Bright Midnight	—	—	—
Live at the Isle of Wight Festival 1970	Released: February 23, 2018; Record label: Rhino/Bright Midnight	—	—	—
Live at the Matrix 1967: The Original Masters	Released: September 8, 2023; Record label: Rhino/Bright Midnight	—	—	—
Live in Bakersfield: August 21, 1970	Released: November 24, 2023; Record label: Rhino/Bright Midnight	129	—	—
Live at Konserthuset, Stockholm, September 20, 1968	Released: April 20, 2024; Record label: Rhino/Bright Midnight	—	—	—
Live in Copenhagen	Released: November 28, 2025; Record label: Rhino/Bright Midnight	—	—	—
Unbound and Dangerous	Released: October 23, 2026; Record label: Rhino/Bright Midnight	—	—	70

=== Box sets ===
Title	Album details	Peak chart positions					Certifications
Title	Album details	US	BEL	FRA	SPA	UK	Certifications
The Doors: Box Set	Released: October 28, 1997; Record label: Elektra	65	—	—	—	194	RIAA: Platinum
The Complete Studio Recordings	Released: November 9, 1999; Record label: Elektra	—	—	—	—	—	
Love/Death/Travel Box Set	Released: January 2006; Record label: Elektra	—	—	—	—	—	
Perception	Released: November 21, 2006; Record label: Elektra	—	—	—	—	—	
The Doors: Vinyl Box Set	Released: April 22, 2008; Record label: Elektra	—	—	—	—	—	
A Collection^{[L]}	Released: July 5, 2011; Record label: Rhino	—	55	146	48	—	
L.A. Woman: The Workshop Sessions	Released: January 31, 2012; Record label: Elektra/Rhino	—	—	—	—	—	
The Doors Infinite	Released: February 5, 2013; Record label: Elektra/Rhino	—	—	—	—	—	
Behind Closed Doors: The Rarities	Released: May 7, 2013; Record label: Elektra/Rhino	—	—	—	—	—	
The Doors Singles Box	Released: July 2, 2013; Record label: WEA Japan	—	—	—	—	—	
The Doors Immersed 1967-1971	Released: October 24, 2025; Record label: Elektra/Rhino		—	—		—	
"—" denotes releases that did not chart or are unknown.

- L:This release also attained a charting position in the country of Italy (32).

== Singles ==
Year	Single	Peak chart positions										Certification	Album
Year	Single	US	AUS^{[M]}	AUT	CAN^{[N]}	FRA	GER	NLD	NZ^{[O]}	SWI	UK	Certification	Album
1967	"Break On Through (To the Other Side)" / "End of the Night"	126	—	—	—	8^{[P]}	—	—	28^{[Q]}	—	64^{[Q]}	RIAA: 2× Platinum; ITA: Gold; BVMI: Gold; BPI: Silver	The Doors
1967	"Light My Fire" / "The Crystal Ship"	1	16	—	2	1^{[P]}	—	25	7	—	7^{[R]}	RIAA: 2× Platinum; ITA: Gold; RMNZ: Platinum; BPI: Silver	The Doors
1967	"People Are Strange" / "Unhappy Girl"	12	—	—	1	—	—	—	9	—	—	RIAA: Platinum; ITA: Gold; SPA: Gold; BPI: Gold	Strange Days
1967	"Love Me Two Times" / "Moonlight Drive"	25	—	—	31	—	—	—	—	—	—	RIAA: Gold	Strange Days
1968	"The Unknown Soldier" / "We Could Be So Good Together"	39	—	—	33	—	—	23	—	—	—		Waiting for the Sun
1968	"Hello, I Love You" / "Love Street"	1	—	—	1	—	33	14	12	10	15	RIAA: Gold	Waiting for the Sun
1968	"Touch Me" / "Wild Child"	3	10	16	1	—	39	21	6	10	—	RIAA: Platinum	The Soft Parade
1969	"Wishful Sinful" / "Who Scared You?"^{[S]}	44	—	—	27	—	—	—	—	—	—		The Soft Parade
1969	"Tell All the People" / "Easy Ride"	57	—	—	32	—	—	—	—	—	—		The Soft Parade
1969	"Runnin' Blue" / "Do It"	64	—	—	24	—	—	—	—	—	—		The Soft Parade
1970	"You Make Me Real" / "Roadhouse Blues"	50	26	—	41	—	—	—	—	—	—	RIAA: Platinum; ITA: Gold; BPI: Silver	Morrison Hotel
1971	"Love Her Madly" / "You Need Meat (Don't Go No Further)"	11	6	—	3	10	—	4	—	—	—	RIAA: Platinum	L.A. Woman
1971	"Riders on the Storm" / "Changeling"	14	10	—	7	1	28	7	20	—	22	RIAA: 2× Platinum; ITA: Gold; SPA: Gold; BPI: Gold	L.A. Woman
1971	"Tightrope Ride" / "Variety Is the Spice of Life"	71	—	—	56	—	—	27	—	—	—		Other Voices
1971	"Ships with Sails" / "In the Eye of the Sun"	—	—	—	—	—	—	—	—	—	—		Other Voices
1972	"The Mosquito" / "It Slipped My Mind"	85	—	15	73	—	25	18	—	—	—		Full Circle
1972	"Get Up and Dance" / "Treetrunk"	—	—	—	—	—	—	—	—	—	—		Full Circle
1972	"The Piano Bird" / "Good Rockin"	—	—	—	—	—	—	—	—	—	—		Full Circle
1979	"Roadhouse Blues" (live) / "Albinoni's Adagio in G Minor (The Severed Garden)"	—	—	—	—	—	—	—	—	—	—		An American Prayer
1980	"People Are Strange" / "Not to Touch the Earth"	—	—	—	—	—	—	—	—	—	—		The Doors Greatest Hits
1983	"Gloria" / "Moonlight Drive" (live)	71	—	—	—	—	—	—	—	—	—		Alive, She Cried
"—" denotes releases that did not chart or are unknown.

=== Other charted songs ===
Year	Song	Peak chart positions			Certifications	Album
Year	Song	AUS	FRA	NLD	Certifications	Album
1967	"Alabama Song (Whiskey Bar)"^{[P]}	—	3	—		The Doors
1967	"The End"^{[P]}	—	10	—	RIAA: Gold	The Doors
1970	"Peace Frog"	—	—	—	RIAA: Gold	Morrison Hotel
1970	"Waiting for the Sun"	—	—	17		Morrison Hotel
1971	"L.A. Woman"	—	—	—	RIAA: Platinum; BPI: Silver	L.A. Woman
1978	"Ghost Song"	48	—	—		An American Prayer
"—" denotes release that did not chart.

As featured artist

Title	Year	Peak chart positions			Album
Title	Year	CAN	UK Dance	UK Singles	Album
"Breakn' a Sweat" (Skrillex featuring The Doors)	2012	80	6	32	Bangarang

Notes

- M:Australian chart positions for singles are as follows: "Light My Fire", "Touch Me", "You Make Me Real", "Love Her Madly", "Riders on the Storm".
- N:Canadian chart positions for singles are as follows: "Light My Fire", "People Are Strange", "Love Me Two Times", "The Unknown Soldier", "Hello, I Love You", "Touch Me", "Wishful Sinful", "Tell All the People", "You Make Me Real", "Love Her Madly", "Riders on the Storm", "Tightrope Ride", "The Mosquito".
- O:All charting positions for singles in New Zealand aside from "Break on Through (To the Other Side)", are from the New Zealand Listener and are not sales based music charts; rather, they were based on voting by NZ Listener readers. Chart positions are as follows: "Break on Through (To the Other Side)", "Light My Fire", "People Are Strange", "Hello, I Love You", "Touch Me", "Riders on the Storm".
- P:In France, Break on Through (To the Other Side) did not appear on the charts until 1970, "Alabama Song (Whiskey Bar)" (1970), "Light My Fire (1971), "The End" (1980).
- Q:Did not appear on charts until 1991.
- R:"Light My Fire" peaked at No. 49 in the UK in 1967. The song attained its peak position of No. 7 in that country in 1991.
- S:"Wishful, Sinful" peaked at No. 3 in Denmark.

== Other appearances ==
Title	Year	Album
"Under Waterfall" and "The Cosmic Movie"	2000	Stoned Immaculate

Guest appearances

Title	Year	Other artist(s)	Album
"Strange 2013"	2013	Tech N9ne	Something Else

== Videos ==
Year	Album details	Certifications (sales thresholds)
1981	A Tribute to Jim Morrison: Released: 1981; Label: Warner Home Video; Format: VHS	US: Platinum
1985	Dance on Fire: Released: 1985; Label: Universal Pictures; Format: VHS, DVD	US: Platinum; MC: Gold
1987	Live at the Hollywood Bowl: Released: 1987; Label: Universal Pictures; Format: VHS, DVD	US: Platinum
1991	The Soft Parade: A Retrospective: Released: 1991; Label: Universal Pictures; Format: VHS, DVD	—
1991	The Doors: Released: 1991; Label: Pioneer; Format: Cinema, VHS, DVD, Blu-ray	—
1997	The Best of The Doors: Released: 1997; Label: Universal Pictures; Format: VHS	—
1998	The Doors Are Open: Released: April 30, 1998; Label: Pioneer; Format: VHS, DVD	—
1999	The Doors Collection: Released: April 13, 1999; Label: Universal Pictures; Format: DVD (Reissue of 1985's Dance on Fire, 1987's Live at the Hollywood Bowl, and 1991's The Soft Parade: A Retrospective, plus extra features)	US: Platinum
2001	The Doors – 30 Years Commemorative Edition: Released: 2001; Label: Universal Pictures; Format: DVD (European release of 1999's The Doors Collection with different extra features)	BPI: Platinum
2001	No One Here Gets Out Alive: Released: January 29, 2001; Label: Eagle Vision; Format: DVD (Reissue of 1981's A Tribute to Jim Morrison)	US: Gold
2001	VH1 Storytellers - The Doors: A Celebration: Released: May 5, 2001; Label: Image Entertainment; Format: DVD	—
2002	The Doors Soundstage Performances: Released: October 22, 2002; Label: Eagle Vision; Format: DVD	US: Gold; ACPVP: Platinum; MC: Gold; BPI: Gold
2003	The Doors of the 21st Century: L.A. Woman Live: Released: July 20, 2003; Label: Image Entertainment; Format: DVD	—
2004	The Doors Live In Europe 1968: Released: 2004; Label: Eagle Vision; Format: DVD	US: 2× Platinum; MC: Gold; ARIA: Gold
2005	The Doors Collector's Edition: Released: 2005; Label: Eagle Vision; Format: DVD (Box set of 2002's The Doors Soundstage Performances and 2004's The Doors Live In Europe 1968)	—
2008	Classic Albums: The Doors: Released: April 22, 2008; Label: Eagle Vision; Format: DVD	—
2010	When You're Strange: Released: May 10, 2010; Label: Universal Pictures; Format: DVD, Blu-ray	US: Gold; BPI: Gold; MC: Platinum
2011	Mr. Mojo Risin': The Story of L.A. Woman: Released: November 7, 2011; Label: Eagle Vision; Format: DVD, Blu-ray	—
2012	Live at The Bowl ‘68: Released: November 19, 2012; Label: Eagle Vision; Format: DVD, Blu-ray (Reissue of 1987's Live at the Hollywood Bowl with missing songs restored and new extra features)	—
2013	R-Evolution: Released: November 24, 2013; Label: Eagle Vision; Format: DVD, Blu-ray	—
2013	The Doors Special Edition: Released: November 30, 2013; Label: Eagle Vision; Format: DVD (Box set of 2002's The Doors Soundstage Performances, 2004's The Doors Live In Europe 1968, and 2012's Live at The Bowl ‘68)	—
2014	Feast of Friends: Released: November 4, 2014; Label: Eagle Vision; Format: DVD, Blu-ray	-
2018	Live at the Isle of Wight Festival 1970: Released: February 23, 2018; Label: Eagle Vision; Format: DVD/CD, Blu-Ray/CD, DVD, Blu-Ray	—
2018	Break on Thru: Celebration of Ray Manzarek and The Doors: Released: April 29, 2018; Label: /; Format: Cinema	—

== See also ==
- List of songs recorded by the Doors
- Outline of the Doors
