= Boot Yer Butt: The Doors Bootlegs =

Boot Yer Butt!: The Doors Bootlegs

Compilation album by the Doors
- Released: December 2003
- Recorded: March 4, 1967-December 11, 1970
- Genres: Psychedelic rock; acid rock; blues rock; hard rock
- Length: 5:05:14
- Labels: Rhino; Bright Midnight Archives

The Doors chronology
Legacy: The Absolute Best (2003)	Boot Yer Butt!: The Doors Bootlegs (2003)	Live in Philadelphia '70 (2005)

Professional ratings
Review scores
Source	Rating
AllMusic	2.5/5 stars

Boot Yer Butt!: The Doors Bootlegs is a four-disc box set released by Rhino/Elektra Records for the band the Doors, featuring songs that were recorded as bootlegs during concerts of the Doors ranging from the years 1967 to 1970.

This is part of previously unreleased material of the Bright Midnight Archives collection of live albums by the Doors.

== Track listing ==
All tracks written by the Doors, except where noted.

=== Disc 1 ===
1. "Bootlegger's Chat" (Sam Houston Coliseum 1968-07-10) – 0:25
2. "Announcer Intro" (Continental Ballroom 1967-07-06) – 0:09
3. "Moonlight Drive" (Jim Morrison) (Avalon Ballroom 1967-03-04) – 7:00
4. "Back Door Man" (Willie Dixon, Chester Burnett) (Avalon Ballroom 1967-03-04) – 5:33
5. "Break On Through (To the Other Side)" (Morrison) (Continental Ballroom 1967-07-06) – 5:55
6. "Light My Fire" (Krieger, Morrison)(The Family Dog 1967-09-30) – 8:38
7. "People Are Strange" (Morrison, Krieger) (Danbury High School 1967-10-11) – 2:30
8. "Alabama Song (Whisky Bar)" (Bertolt Brecht, Kurt Weill) (Swing Auditorium 1967-12-16) – 3:30
9. "Close to You" (Dixon) (Winterland Arena 1967-12-26) – 2:39
10. "I'm a Man" (Bo Diddley) (Winterland Arena 1967-12-26) – 7:01
11. "Love Me Two Times" (Back Bay Theatre 1968-03-17) – 3:16
12. "Soul Kitchen" (Morrison) (Chicago Coliseum 1968-05-10) – 7:38
13. "The WASP (Texas Radio and the Big Beat)" / "Hello, I Love You" (Morrison) (Dallas Memorial Auditorium 1968-07-09) – 3:45
14. "Money" (Janie Bradford, Berry Gordy) (Dallas Memorial Auditorium 1968-07-09) – 3:19
15. "When the Music's Over" (Sam Houston Coliseum 1968-07-10) – 14:58

=== Disc 2 ===
1. "Never Before in Public" (Singer Bowl 1968-08-02) - 0:12
2. "Wild Child" (Morrison) (Singer Bowl 1968-08-02) - 2:44
3. "Gonna Have a Real Good Time (Rap)" (Cleveland Public Auditorium 1968-08-03) - 0:15
4. "Spanish Caravan" (Morrison/Krieger) (Philadelphia Arena 1968-08-04) - 2:58
5. "Five to One" (Morrison) (The Roundhouse 1968-09-07) – 5:18
6. "The Unknown Soldier" (Kongresshalle 1968-09-14) – 4:44
7. "Vince Treanor's Announcement (Concertgebouw 1968-09-15) – 0:37
8. "Break On Through (To the Other Side)" (Morrison) (Concertgebouw 1968-09-15) – 5:38
9. "Little Red Rooster" (Dixon) (Minneapolis Concert Hall, 1968-11-10) – 6:55
10. "Wild Child" (Morrison) (Minneapolis Concert Hall, 1968-11-10) – 2:56
11. "Love Me Two Times" (Minneapolis Concert Hall, 1968-11-10) – 12:10
12. "Touch Me" (Krieger) (L.A. Forum 1968-12-14) – 3:43
13. "Celebration of the Lizard" (Morrison) (L.A. Forum 1968-12-14) – 13:53
14. "The Soft Parade" (Morrison) (Madison Square Garden 1969-01-24) – 7:40
15. "Tell All the People" (Krieger) (Madison Square Garden 1969-01-24) – 3:24
16. "Who Scared You" (Madison Square Garden 1969-01-24) – 4:25
17. "Does Anybody Have A Cigarette? (Rap)" (Madison Square Garden 1969-01-24) – 0:54

=== Disc 3 ===
1. "Back Door Man" (Dixon, Burnett) (Madison Square Garden 1969-01-24) – 8:35
2. "Five to One" (Morrison) (Madison Square Garden 1969-01-24) – 5:27
3. "Forget This Is the Square Garden (Rap)" (Madison Square Garden 1969-01-24) – 0:51
4. "Hitler Poem" (Madison Square Garden 1969-01-24) – 1:01
5. "I'm Talkin' About Having a Good Time (Rap)" (Dinner Key Auditorium 1969-03-01) – 1:47
6. "No Limits, No Laws (Rap)" (Dinner Key Auditorium 1969-03-01) – 1:15
7. "The Crystal Ship" (Morrison) (Varsity Stadium 1969-09-13) – 2:52
8. "Carol" (Chuck Berry) (Winterland Arena 1970-02-06) – 1:45
9. "Rock Me" (B.B. King) (Winterland Arena 1970-02-06) – 6:24
10. "The Spy" (Long Beach Sports Arena 1970-02-07) – 5:31
11. "Is There Any Left? (Rap)" (Long Beach Sports Arena 1970-02-07) – 0:56
12. "Blue Sunday" (Long Beach Sports Arena 1970-02-07) – 2:00
13. "Petition the Lord with Prayer/Maggie M'Gill" (Long Beach Sports Arena 1970-02-07) – 8:20
14. "Will the Circle Be Unbroken?" (Carter) (Chicago Auditorium Theatre, 1970-02-15) – 1:34
15. "Roadhouse Blues" (Morrison) (Honolulu Convention Center 1970-04-18) – 5:03
16. "Peace Frog" (Morrison, Krieger) (Honolulu Convention Center 1970-04-18) – 3:39
17. "Mystery Train" (Junior Parker) (Honolulu Convention Center 1970-04-18) – 13:48

=== Disc 4 ===
1. "Light My Fire" (Krieger, Morrison)(Honolulu Convention Center 1970-04-18) – 21:00
2. "Love Her Madly" (Krieger) (State Fair Music Hall 1970-12-11) – 10:20
3. "Ship of Fools" (Morrison, Krieger) (State Fair Music Hall 1970-12-11) – 8:30
4. "The Changeling" (Morrison) (State Fair Music Hall 1970-12-11) – 5:07
5. "L.A. Woman" (Morrison) (State Fair Music Hall 1970-12-11) – 16:06
6. "The End" (Singer Bowl 1968-08-02) – 17:01
7. "Announcer Outro" (Cleveland Public Auditorium 1968-08-03) - 1:27
