= Live in New York (The Doors live album) =

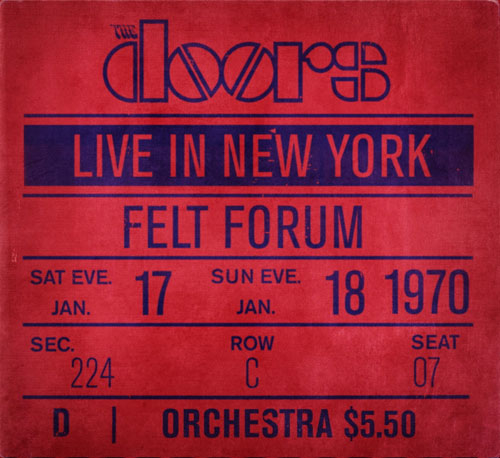

Live album by the Doors
- Released: November 17, 2009
- Recorded: January 17 & 18, 1970
- Venues: Felt Forum, New York City
- Genres: Psychedelic rock; acid rock; blues rock
- Length: 360:46
- Labels: Rhino; Bright Midnight Archives
- Producer: Bruce Botnick

The Doors chronology
Live at the Matrix 1967 (2008)	Live in New York (2009)	Live in Vancouver 1970 (2010)

Professional ratings
Review scores
Source	Rating
AllMusic	4/5 stars
Pitchfork Media	(7.0/10)

Live in New York is a six-disc box set of four complete concerts performed American rock band the Doors on January 17 and 18, 1970 at the Felt Forum in New York City. Two shows were played each night, with 8:00pm and 11:00pm scheduled start times on January 17, and 7:30pm and 10:00pm scheduled start times on January 18. The final show featured an extended encore with guests John Sebastian (harmonica and vocals) and Dallas Taylor (drums) that concluded around 2:30am. Select tracks were previously released on the Doors' live album In Concert and as part of The Doors: Box Set. About a third of the material was previously unreleased.

The concerts were held a few weeks before the band released their fifth studio album Morrison Hotel on February 9, 1970. The box set was released by Rhino Records from the Bright Midnight Archives collection which contains several previously unreleased live concerts by the Doors.

== Production ==
The original 8-track and 2-track concert recordings had been used for the 1970 release of Absolutely Live. During this editing of the tapes, many cuts had been made which left the original running order severely compromised. To ensure the correct running order was used, the audience recorded bootlegs were used. However, this process has led to occasional dips in sound quality.

Additionally, John Sebastian's blues harmonica was recorded through the PA system on the final three songs and not recorded onto tape. Long-time Doors' sound engineer/producer Bruce Botnick got John Sebastian to re-record his performance four decades after the original concerts.

== Track listing ==
=== Show One ===
==== Disc 1 (January 17, 1970, 1st show) ====
1. (Start of Show 1)
2. Roadhouse Blues (Morrison)
3. Ship of Fools (Jim Morrison)
4. Break On Through (To the Other Side) (Morrison)
5. (Tuning/Breather)
6. Peace Frog (Morrison, Robby Krieger)
7. Blue Sunday (Morrison)
8. Alabama Song (Whisky Bar) (Bertolt Brecht, Kurt Weill)
9. Back Door Man (Willie Dixon, Chester Burnett)
10. Love Hides (Instrumental version) (Morrison)
11. Five to One (Morrison)
12. (Tuning/Breather)
13. Who Do You Love? (Bo Diddley)
14. Little Red Rooster (Dixon)
15. Money (Janie Bradford, Berry Gordy)
16. (Tuning/Breather)
17. Light My Fire (Krieger), (Morrison)
18. (More, More, More)
19. Soul Kitchen (Morrison)
20. (End of Show)

=== Show Two ===
==== Disc 2 (January 17, 1970, 2nd show) ====
1. (Start Of Show 2)
2. (Jim “How Ya Doing?”)
3. Roadhouse Blues (Morrison)
4. Break On Through (To the Other Side) (Morrison)
5. Ship of Fools (Morrison)
6. Crawling King Snake (Anon, arr. by John Lee Hooker)
7. Alabama Song (Whisky Bar) (Brecht, Weill)
8. Back Door Man (Dixon, Burnett) including hummed vocal version of "Love Hides" (Morrison)
9. Five to One (Morrison)
10. (Pretty Neat, Pretty Good)
11. Build Me a Woman (Morrison) including "Poontang Blues" and "Sunday Trucker" (Morrison)
12. (Tuning/Breather)
13. Who Do You Love? (Diddley)
14. (Tuning/Breather)
15. Wild Child (Morrison)
16. (Cheering/Tuning)
17. When the Music's Over

==== Disc 3 (January 17, 1970, 2nd show cont.) ====
1. (Tuning/Breather)
2. Light My Fire (Krieger), (Morrison)
3. (Hey, Mr. Light Man!)
4. Soul Kitchen (Morrison) including "Now I Lay Me Down to Sleep" (traditional)
5. (Jim's Fish Joke)
6. The End
7. (End of Show)

=== Show Three ===
==== Disc 4 (January 18, 1970, 1st show) ====
1. (Start of Show 3)
2. Roadhouse Blues (Morrison)
3. Ship of Fools (Morrison)
4. Break On Through (To the Other Side) (Morrison)
5. (Tuning/Breather)
6. Universal Mind
7. Alabama Song (Whisky Bar) (False Start) (Brecht, Weill)
8. Alabama Song (Whisky Bar) (Brecht, Weill)
9. Back Door Man (Dixon, Burnett) including the instrumental version of "Love Hides" (Morrison)
10. Five to One (Morrison)
11. (Tuning/Breather)
12. Moonlight Drive (Morrison) including "Horse Latitudes" (Morrison)
13. Who Do You Love? (Diddley)
14. (Calling Out for Songs)
15. Money (Bradford, Gordy)
16. (Tuning/Breather)
17. Light My Fire (Krieger), (Morrison)
18. (More, More, More)
19. When the Music's Over
20. (Good Night/End of Show)

=== Show Four ===
==== Disc 5 (January 18, 1970, 2nd show) ====
1. (Start of Show 4)
2. Roadhouse Blues (Morrison)
3. Peace Frog (Morrison, Krieger)
4. Alabama Song (Whisky Bar) (Brecht, Weill)
5. Back Door Man (Dixon, Burnett)
6. Five to One (Morrison)
7. (We Have a Special Treat)
8. Celebration of the Lizard (Morrison) (*)
9. (Alright Let's Boogie)
10. Build Me a Woman (Morrison)
11. When the Music's Over
12. (More, More, More)

(*) Medley that contains: "Lions in the Street", "Wake Up!", "A Little Game", "The Hill Dwellers", "Not to Touch the Earth", "Names of the Kingdom" and "The Palace of Exile".

==== Disc 6 (January 18, 1970, 2nd show cont.) ====
1. Soul Kitchen (Morrison) including "Now I Lay Me Down to Sleep" (traditional)
2. (For Fear of Getting Too Patriotic)
3. Petition the Lord with Prayer (Morrison)
4. Light My Fire (Krieger), (Morrison)
5. (Only When the Moon Comes Out)
6. Close to You (Dixon)
7. (The Encore Begins)
8. Rock Me (Muddy Waters)
9. (What to Do Next?)
10. Going to N.Y. Blues
11. (Tuning/Breather)
12. Maggie M’Gill (Morrison)
13. (Tuning/Breather)
14. Gloria (Van Morrison) including lyrics from "Easy Ride" (J. Morrison) and "My Eyes Have Seen You" (J. Morrison)

== Personnel ==
The Doors

- Jim Morrison – vocals
- Ray Manzarek – organ, keyboard bass, vocals on "Close to You"
- Robby Krieger – electric guitar
- John Densmore – drums

Additional musicians

- John Sebastian – Harmonica on "Rock Me", "Going To N.Y. Blues" & " Maggie M’Gill"
- Dallas Taylor – drums on "Going To N.Y. Blues"
