= Live in Detroit (The Doors album) =

Live album by the Doors
- Released: October 23, 2000
- Recorded: May 8, 1970
- Venues: Cobo Arena Detroit, Michigan
- Genre: Rock
- Length: 135:03
- Labels: Rhino Entertainment; Bright Midnight Archives
- Producer: Bruce Botnick

The Doors chronology
The Bright Midnight Sampler (2000)	Live in Detroit (2000)	The Best of The Doors (2000)

Professional ratings
Review scores
Source	Rating
AllMusic	4/5 stars

Live in Detroit is a double CD live album by the American rock band the Doors. It was recorded at the Cobo Arena in Detroit on May 8, 1970 during the band's 1970 Roadhouse Blues Tour. It was released on October 23, 2000 on Rhino Records.

The concert is one of the longest live performances by the Doors. Among the 25 songs played that night, the group played eight blues standards such as "Back Door Man", Junior Parker's "Mystery Train" and "Crossroads" by Robert Johnson. The band were joined by Lovin' Spoonful's John Sebastian on guitar and harmonica on the L.A. Woman track "Been Down So Long," "Love Hides", Chuck Berry's "Carol", Muddy Waters' "Close to You," and Slim Harpo's "I'm a King Bee." The concert was originally scheduled to end before midnight but ran on until one in the morning. This late end, against union rules, saw the band being banned from the Cobo Arena.

== Releases ==
Live in Detroit was one of the first releases from the Bright Midnight Archives collection which contains a number of previously unreleased live concerts by the Doors.

The album was mixed and mastered by long-time Doors' sound engineer Bruce Botnick. He had recorded several shows from the Doors’ 1970 Roadhouse Blues Tour on multi-track tape for the Absolutely Live album released in July 1970.

== Track listing ==
According to the AllMusic credits.

Disc one

1. Tuning – 1:37
2. Roadhouse Vamp – 1:31
3. Hello to the Cities – 1:16
4. Dead Cats, Dead Rats – 1:54
5. Break On Through (To the Other Side) (Jim Morrison) – 4:45
6. Alabama Song (Whisky Bar) (Kurt Weill, Bertolt Brecht) – 1:55
7. Back Door Man (Willie Dixon, Chester Burnett) – 2:24
8. Five to One (Morrison) – 6:44
9. Roadhouse Blues (Morrison) – 6:44
10. You Make Me Real (Morrison) – 2:57
11. Ship of Fools (Morrison, Robby Krieger) – 7:23
12. When the Music's Over – 17:40
13. People Get Ready (Curtis Mayfield) – 0:36
14. Mystery Train (Junior Parker) – 7:03
15. Away in India – 2:07
16. Crossroads (Robert Johnson) – 4:01

Disc two

1. Tuning – 1:59
2. Carol (Chuck Berry) – 1:50
3. Light My Fire (Krieger, Morrison) – 19:39
4. Been Down So Long (Morrison) – 9:07
5. Love Hides (Morrison) – 1:45
6. Mean Mustard Blues – 3:47
7. Carol (Reprise) (Berry) – 0:44
8. Close to You (Willie Dixon) – 1:38
9. I'm a King Bee (James Moore) – 2:37
10. Rock Me Baby (Arthur Crudup) / Heartbreak Hotel (Mae Boren Axton, Thomas Durden) – 5:40
11. The End - 17:35

== Personnel ==
- Jim Morrison – vocals, harmonica on "The End"
- Ray Manzarek – organ, keyboard bass, vocals on "Mean Mustard Blues", "Carol (Reprise)", "Close to You" & "I'm a King Bee"
- Robby Krieger – electric guitar
- John Densmore – drums
- John Sebastian – harmonica, electric guitar

== Charts ==
Chart performance for Live in Detroit
Chart (2024)	Peak position
Croatian International Albums (HDU)	30
Hungarian Physical Albums (MAHASZ)	15
