= The Bright Midnight Sampler =

2000 live album by the Doors

Live album by the Doors
- Released: September 25, 2000
- Recorded: July 1969–August 1970
- Venues: Aquarius Theatre Hollywood, Felt Forum, New York City, Boston Arena Boston, Massachusetts, The Spectrum, Pennsylvania, Pittsburgh Civic Arena Pittsburgh, Pennsylvania, Cobo Arena Detroit, Michigan, Bakersfield Civic Auditorium California
- Genres: Psychedelic rock; acid rock; blues rock
- Length: 73:41
- Labels: Rhino, Bright Midnight Archives
- Producer: Bruce Botnick

The Doors chronology
The Complete Studio Recordings (1999)	The Bright Midnight Sampler (2000)	Live in Detroit (2000)

Professional ratings
Review scores
Source	Rating
AllMusic	3/5 stars

The Bright Midnight Sampler (Note: in Europe entitled Bright Midnight: Live in America) is a compilation CD of live performances by American rock band the Doors, released September 25, 2000.

== Background ==
Recorded between July 1969 and August 1970, the collection contains 14 songs from 8 concerts performed in the United States. The CD, remastered by long-time Doors sound engineer and producer Bruce Botnick, was the first official publication released from the Bright Midnight Archives collection containing previously unreleased live concerts by the Doors.

== Bright Midnight: Live in America ==
Bright Midnight: Live in America

Live album by the Doors
- Released: November 17, 2000
- Recorded: July 1969–August 1970
- Venues: Aquarius Theatre Hollywood, Felt Forum, New York City, Boston Arena Boston, Massachusetts, The Spectrum, Pennsylvania, Pittsburgh Civic Arena Pittsburgh, Pennsylvania, Cobo Arena Detroit, Michigan, Bakersfield Civic Auditorium California
- Genres: Psychedelic rock; acid rock; blues rock
- Length: 73:41
- Labels: Elektra; Bright Midnight Archives
- Producer: Bruce Botnick

The Doors chronology
Live in Detroit (2000)	Bright Midnight: Live in America (2000)	Live in Hollywood (2002)

Professional ratings
Review scores
Source	Rating
AllMusic	4/5 stars

Bright Midnight: Live in America is the British version of the album which was released by Elektra on CD as a limited edition. The CD is the first American production by Bright Midnight Archives, and features an extract from the extensive archival material recorded live, which the band released in the following years with the label Bright Midnight Archives.

== Track listings ==
No.	Title	Writer(s)	Concert	Length
1.	"Light My Fire"	Robby Krieger, Jim Morrison	May 1, 1970 Spectrum in Philadelphia, Pennsylvania	11:30
2.	"Been Down So Long"	Morrison	May 8, 1970 Cobo Arena in Detroit, Michigan	9:07
3.	"Back Door Man"	Chester Burnett, Willie Dixon	May 2, 1970 Pittsburgh Civic Arena in Pittsburgh, Pennsylvania	2:24
4.	"Love Hides"	Morrison	May 2, 1970 Pittsburgh Civic Arena in Pittsburgh, Pennsylvania	2:23
5.	"Five to One"	Morrison	May 2, 1970 Pittsburgh Civic Arena in Pittsburgh, Pennsylvania	5:11
6.	"Touch Me"	Krieger	Second Show July 21, 1969 Aquarius Theatre in Hollywood, California	3:33
7.	"The Crystal Ship"	Morrison	Second Show July 21, 1969 Aquarius Theatre in Hollywood, California	2:58
8.	"Break On Through (To the Other Side)"	Morrison	First Show January 17, 1970 Felt Forum, Madison Square Garden in New York	4:24
9.	"Bellowing"	Morrison	First Show April 10, 1970 Boston Arena in Boston, Massachusetts	1:31
10.	"Roadhouse Blues"	Morrison	Second Show April 10, 1970 Boston Arena in Boston, Massachusetts	5:22
11.	"Alabama Song (Whisky Bar)"	Bertolt Brecht, Kurt Weill	Second Show January 17, 1970 Felt Forum, Madison Square Garden in New York	1:55
12.	"Medley: Love Me Two Times / Baby, Please Don't Go / St. James Infirmary"	Krieger, Irving Mills, Big Joe Williams	August 21, 1970 Bakersfield Civic Auditorium, California	8:51
13.	"The End"	The Doors	May 8, 1970 Cobo Arena in Detroit, Michigan	16:16

== Personnel ==
- Jim Morrison – vocals, harmonica on "The End"
- Ray Manzarek – keyboard bass, organ
- Robby Krieger – electric guitar
- John Densmore – drums
- Bruce Botnick – production and mastering
- Danny Sugerman – manager
