= Unbound and Dangerous =

Live album by the Doors
- Released: October 23, 2026
- Recorded: 1970
- Length: 1:19:30
- Labels: Rhino; Elektra
- Producer: Bruce Botnick

The Doors chronology
Live in Copenhagen (2025)	Unbound and Dangerous (2026)

Unbound and Dangerous is a live album by the American rock band the Doors, released on October 23, 2026, by Rhino Entertainment and Elektra Records. It was recorded in 1970 during the Doors' Roadhouse Blues tour.

== Background and contents ==
Unbound and Dangerous contains 16 tracks remixed by Bruce Botnick sourced from the Doors' 1970 Roadhouse Blues Tour. It contains liner notes written by Botnick, John Densmore and Robby Krieger. The performances come from New York City, Philadelphia, Pittsburgh, and Detroit, except for the performance of "Soul Kitchen", which hails from the Aquarius Theatre in Hollywood on July 21, 1969. The Blu-ray version of the album contains video versions of the album created by Botnick, as well as a Dolby Atmos version of the album.

== Track listing ==
=== LP one ===
All songs written by the Doors, except where noted.

Side one
No.	Title	Length
1.	"Introduction"	0:28
2.	"Dead Cats, Dead Rats"	1:48
3.	"Break On Through (To the Other Side)"	4:43
4.	"When the Music's Over"	14;39

No.	Title	Writer(s)	Length
5.	"Roadhouse Blues"		6:08
6.	"Alabama Song (Whisky Bar)"	Bertolt Brecht, Kurt Weill	1:50
7.	"Back Door Man"	Willie Dixon	3:51
8.	"Five to One"		4:30
9.	"Build Me a Woman"		3:29

=== LP two ===
All songs written by the Doors, except where noted.

Side three
No.	Title	Writer(s)	Length
1.	"Petition the Lord with Prayer"		0:46
2.	"Light My Fire"		8:55
3.	"Crawling King Snake"	John Lee Hooker	5:24
4.	"Soul Kitchen"		6:34

Side four
No.	Title	Length
1.	"Bring Out Your Dead"	0:25
2.	"The End"	15:08
3.	"Thank You and Good Night"	0:47

== Charts ==
Chart (2026)	Peak position
Austrian Albums (Ö3 Austria)	48
Belgian Albums (Ultratop Flanders)	97
Belgian Albums (Ultratop Wallonia)	53
French Albums (SNEP)	182
German Albums (Offizielle Top 100)	87
Scottish Albums (Official Charts)	27
Swiss Albums (Schweizer Hitparade)	70
US Top Album Sales (Billboard)	20
US Indie Store Album Sales (Billboard)	15
