= Live in Bakersfield: August 21, 1970 =

Live album by the Doors
- Released: November 24, 2023
- Recorded: August 21, 1970
- Venue: Bakersfield Civic Auditorium
- Genre: Rock
- Length: 92:45
- Label: Rhino

The Doors chronology
Live at the Isle of Wight Festival 1970 (2018)	Live in Bakersfield: August 21, 1970 (2023)	Live at Konserhuset, September 20, 1968, Stockholm (2024)

Live in Bakersfield: August 21, 1970 is a live album by the American rock band the Doors, released on November 24, 2023, by Rhino Entertainment as a part of the Doors' archive series of live albums. The album is a recording of the band's performance on August 21, 1970, at the Bakersfield Civic Auditorium which according to an Instagram post to the band's social media is "one of the most sought-after live shows of 1970". It was originally released as a Record Store Day exclusive, but was later released on its own and charted on the Billboard 200 and on various UK charts.

== Reception ==
Professional ratings
Review scores
Source	Rating
All About Jazz	4/5 stars
AllMusic	3.5/5 stars
Under the Radar	8/10 stars

All About Jazz critic Doug Collette stated that "this two-CD set resides at the opposite end of the musical spectrum from the pre-fame performances that comprise Live at the Matrix.", noting that "the package itself befits the collectible nature of Live in Bakersfield August 21, 1970. More importantly, however, this set documents one of the final in-person events of the Doors' career, one that turns eerily true-to-life during the extended final tracks on each compact disc".

Writing for AllMusic, Fred Thomas writes that it "finds the Doors in a nearly trance-like state", noting that "The raw sound quality will turn off some listeners, as it was recorded with a few mics on-stage, achieving fidelity just above a tape recorder snuck into the show in the leg of someone's boot, but not by much".

== Track listing ==
Disc one
No.	Title	Length
1.	"Roadhouse Blues"	5:50
2.	"Medley: "Alabama Song (Whisky Bar)"/"Back Door Man"/"Five to One"	12:42
3.	"Medley: "Universal Mind"/"Afro Blue"	8:33
4.	"When the Music's Over"	13:40

Disc two
No.	Title	Length
1.	"Medley: "Love Me Two Times"/"Baby, Please Don't Go"/"St. James Infirmary"	9:04
2.	"Medley: "People Get Ready"/"Mystery Train"/"Away in India"/"Crossroads"	16:22
3.	"Ship of Fools"	8:26
4.	"The End"	16:57

== Personnel ==
- Jim Morrison – vocals
- Ray Manzarek – organ, keyboard bass
- Robby Krieger – guitar
- John Densmore – drums

== Charts ==
Chart (2023)	Peak position
Scottish Albums (Official Charts)	54
US Billboard 200	129
US Indie Store Album Sales (Billboard)	1
US Top Rock Albums (Billboard)	20
US Vinyl Albums (Billboard)	15
