= Backstage and Dangerous: The Private Rehearsal =

Live album by The Doors
- Released: January 23, 2002
- Recorded: July 22, 1969
- Venue: Aquarius Theatre, Los Angeles Hollywood
- Genre: Psychedelic rock, acid rock, blues-rock
- Length: 89:10
- Label: Rhino - Bright Midnight Archives
- Producer: Bruce Botnick

The Doors chronology
| The Lost Interview Tapes Featuring Jim Morrison Volume Two (2002) | Backstage and Dangerous: The Private Rehearsal (2002) | Live in Hollywood (2002) |

Alternative cover

Professional ratings
Review scores
| Source | Rating |
|---|---|
| Allmusic | link |

Backstage and Dangerous: The Private Rehearsal is a live album by the American rock band the Doors. It was recorded during a private rehearsal at the Aquarius Theatre in Hollywood on July 22, 1969, except "Jazzy Maggie M'Gill" (Disc 2 tracks 10 & 11) that was recorded during the concert soundcheck on July 21, 1969. Indeed, the band had played two concerts at the venue the previous day.

The album was released from the Bright Midnight Archives collection which contains a number of previously unreleased live concerts by the Doors.

Additional performance recordings made by the Doors at the Aquarius Theater appear on Live in Hollywood: Highlights from the Aquarius Theater Performances, Live at the Aquarius Theatre: The First Performance and Live at the Aquarius Theatre: The Second Performance.

== Track listings ==
All songs written by the Doors except where noted.

=== Disc one ===
| No. | Title | Writer(s) | Length |
|---|---|---|---|
| 1. | "We're Rolling" | | 0:08 |
| 2. | "I Will Never Be Untrue" | Jim Morrison | 5:56 |
| 3. | "Peace Frog (instrumental)" | Jim Morrison, Robby Krieger | 2:50 |
| 4. | "Blue Sunday" | Morrison | 4:08 |
| 5. | "Maggie M'Gill" | Morrison | 4:48 |
| 6. | "Arranging (You Need Meat) Don't Go No Further" | Willie Dixon | 1:16 |
| 7. | "(You Need Meat) Don't Go No Further*" | Dixon | 3:52 |
| 8. | "Arranging Close to You" | Dixon | 0:21 |
| 9. | "Close to You*" | Dixon | 3:46 |
| 10. | "Arranging Gloria" | Van Morrison | 0:56 |
| 11. | "Gloria" | Van Morrison | 8:58 |
| 12. | "Mystery Train Rehearsal" | Junior Parker | 4:42 |
| 13. | "Mystery Train/Crossroads" | Parker, Robert Johnson | 9:47 |

=== Disc two ===
| No. | Title | Writer(s) | Length |
|---|---|---|---|
| 1. | "Continued" | | 0:15 |
| 2. | "Thousands of Dollars Rest Upon This Day" | | 0:21 |
| 3. | "I'm Your Doctor*" | St. Louis Jimmy Oden | 2:37 |
| 4. | "Hyper Yachting" | | 0:30 |
| 5. | "Build Me a Woman" | Morrison | 6:55 |
| 6. | "Yachting" | | 3:58 |
| 7. | "Cars Hiss by My Window" | Morrison | 10:07 |
| 8. | "Money Beats Soul" | Morrison | 0:47 |
| 9. | "Mental Floss" | Morrison | 5:19 |
| 10. | "Jazzy Maggie M'Gill Rehearsal" | Morrison | 2:04 |
| 11. | "Jazzy Maggie M'Gill" | Morrison | 4:49 |

- Vocals by Ray Manzarek

== Personnel ==
- Jim Morrison - vocals
- Ray Manzarek - organ, keyboard bass
- Robby Krieger - electric guitar
- John Densmore - drums
