= Live at the Matrix 1967 =

Live album by the Doors
- Released: November 18, 2008
- Recorded: March 7 & 10, 1967
- Venues: The Matrix Club, 3138 Fillmore Street, San Francisco, CA
- Genres: Psychedelic rock, acid rock, blues rock
- Length: 125:46
- Labels: Rhino; Bright Midnight Archives
- Producer: Bruce Botnick

The Doors chronology
| Live in Pittsburgh 1970 (2008) | Live at the Matrix 1967 (2008) | Live in New York (2009) |

Live at the Matrix 1967 is a double live album by the American rock band the Doors. It was recorded at The Matrix in San Francisco on March 7 and 10, 1967 by club co-owner Peter Abram (the other co-owner was Marty Balin). The recording is notable as one of the earliest live recordings of the band known to exist, played to a mostly empty venue. By March 1967, the Doors had recorded only their debut album (released January 4, 1967) and "Light My Fire" had yet to be released as a single (on April 24, 1967), and they were still relatively unknown outside Southern California. In 2023, a three disc version sourced from the original master tapes was released.

== Recording equipment ==
On November 22, 2008, recording engineer Peter Abram revealed in an online posting the equipment he used to record the Doors at The Matrix:

I used an Akai tape recorder (tubes), 4 Calrad mics on the stage and a Calrad mic mixer on the instrumental channel. On the vocal channel: a Knight mixer with 3 Electrovoice 676 and Shure mics. The Calrad mics that I used on the instrumental track were model DM-21.

The original master quarter-inch track stereo tapes were recorded at 7.5 ips on Abram's Akai reel-to-reel vacuum tube tape recorder.

== Release and master tape issues ==
Professional ratings
Review scores
| Source | Rating |
|---|---|
| AllMusic | 4/5 stars |
| BBC | (?) |
| CHARTattack | 4/5 stars |
| Crawdaddy | (?) |
| PopMatters | (?) |
| Rolling Stone | 4/5 stars |
| San Francisco Chronicle | (?) |

The release was mastered by long-time Doors' sound engineer/producer Bruce Botnick. The album was released from the Bright Midnight Archives collection which contains a number of previously unreleased live concerts by the Doors.

PopMatters music critic Steve Horowitz observed in his review of Live at the Matrix 1967, entitled "Money...That's What I Want," that the Rhino CD was not sourced from Peter Abram's master tapes; Rhino's press release stated that "first generation tapes" were used.

On December 2, 2008, Peter Abram allowed photos to be taken of his master tape boxes. These photos were published online at the Steve Hoffman Forums on December 4, 2008. Abram's notations on the master tape boxes indicate that a 'jam' was performed between "Soul Kitchen" and "Get Out of My Life, Woman" during the March 7, 1967 show. For Record Store Day 2017, 10,000 condensed version LPs were released to celebrate the 50th anniversary of the Doors.

In 2023, a three disc version sourced from the original masters was released.

== Track listing ==
=== Disc one ===
All songs written by Jim Morrison, Robby Krieger, Ray Manzarek and John Densmore, except where noted.

1. "Break On Through (To the Other Side)" (Jim Morrison) – 3:47
2. "Soul Kitchen" (Morrison) – 5:51
3. "Money" (Janie Bradford, Berry Gordy) – 3:02
4. "The Crystal Ship" (Morrison) – 2:50
5. "Twentieth Century Fox" (Morrison) – 2:46
6. "I'm a King Bee" (James Moore) – 3:48
7. "Alabama Song (Whisky Bar)" (Bertolt Brecht, Kurt Weill) – 3:16
8. "Summer's Almost Gone" (Morrison) – 3:46
9. "Light My Fire" (Robby Krieger, Jim Morrison) – 8:14
10. "Get Out of My Life, Woman" (Allen Toussaint) – 3:58
11. "Back Door Man" (Willie Dixon, Chester Burnett) – 5:14
12. "Who Do You Love" (Bo Diddley) – 4:31
13. "The End" – 14:02

=== Disc two ===
1. "Unhappy Girl" (Morrison) – 3:56
2. "Moonlight Drive" (Morrison) – 5:39
3. "Woman Is a Devil/Rock Me Baby" (Morrison), (B.B. King) – 8:08
4. "People Are Strange" (Morrison, Krieger) – 2:14
5. "Close to You" (Dixon) – 2:56
6. "My Eyes Have Seen You" (Morrison) – 2:56
7. "Crawling King Snake" (Anon, arr. by John Lee Hooker) – 4:53
8. "I Can't See Your Face in My Mind" (Morrison) – 3:07
9. "Summertime" (George Gershwin, DuBose Heyward) – 8:29
10. "When the Music's Over" – 11:11
11. "Gloria" (Van Morrison) – 5:36
- 1-10 from March 7, 1st show
- 1-4, 1-5, 1-7, 2-1, 2-2, 2-5, & 2-7 from March 7, 2nd show
- 1-1, 1-9, 1-13 & 2-3 from March 7, 3rd show
- 1-2, 2-4, 2-6, 2-8 & 2-10 from March 10, 1st show
- 1-3, 1-6, 1-8, 1-11, 1-12, 2-9 & 2-11 from March 10, 2nd show

== Personnel ==
The Doors

- Jim Morrison – vocals, harmonica on "Crawling King Snake"
- Ray Manzarek – organ, keyboard bass, vocals on "I'm a King Bee", "Get Out of My Life, Woman" and "Close to You"
- Robby Krieger – electric guitar
- John Densmore - drums

Production

- Produced by: Bruce Botnick
- Production Supervisor and Personal Management: Jeffrey Jampol
- Artists and Repertoire: Robin Hurley
- Product Manager: Kenny Nemes
- Project Coordinator: Cory Lashever
- Project Assistance: John Espinoza, Steven Gorman, Bob Martin, Peter Tarnoff, Alessandra Quaranta
- Cover Artwork: Stanley Mouse
- Art Direction & Design: Bryan Lasley, Maria McKenna, and Joshua Petker
- Doors Archivist: David Dutkowski
- Photos: Bobby Klein, Jim Marshall, and Tim Boxer
- Legal Representation: John Branca and David Byrnes

== Charts ==
2023 chart performance for Live at the Matrix 1967
| Chart (2023) | Peak position |
|---|---|
| Austrian Albums (Ö3 Austria) | 32 |
| Belgian Albums (Ultratop Flanders) | 45 |
| Belgian Albums (Ultratop Wallonia) | 27 |
| Croatian International Albums (HDU) | 9 |
| German Albums (Offizielle Top 100) | 16 |
| Hungarian Physical Albums (MAHASZ) | 7 |
| Spanish Albums (Promusicae) | 62 |
| Swiss Albums (Schweizer Hitparade) | 13 |
