= Live at the Aquarius Theatre: The Second Performance =

Live album by The Doors
- Released: 2001
- Recorded: July 21, 1969
- Venues: Aquarius Theatre, Los Angeles Hollywood
- Genres: Psychedelic rock, blues rock, acid rock
- Length: 137:58
- Label: Rhino - Bright Midnight Archives
- Producer: Bruce Botnick

The Doors chronology
Live at the Aquarius Theatre: The First Performance (2001)	Live at the Aquarius Theatre: The Second Performance (2001)	The Very Best of The Doors (2001)

Professional ratings
Review scores
Source	Rating
Allmusic	4/5 stars

Live at the Aquarius Theater: The Second Performance is a double live album of the band the Doors, released as a double CD recorded live at the Aquarius Theatre in Hollywood on 21 July 1969, the day their studio album The Soft Parade was released. This album is one of the live performances at Aquarius Theatre by the label of the Bright Midnight Archives.

This is part of previously unreleased material of the Bright Midnight Archives collection of live albums by the Doors.

== Track listings ==
All songs written by the Doors except where noted.

=== Disc one ===
1. Concert Introduction and Tuning - 2:06
2. Jim's Introduction - 0:11
3. Back Door Man (Willie Dixon, Chester Burnett) - 4:35
4. Break On Through (To the Other Side) (Jim Morrison) - 3:53
5. When the Music's Over - 12:07
6. Tuning - 0:57
7. You Make Me Real (Morrison) - 3:05
8. Tuning - 0:25
9. Universal Mind (Morrison) - 4:42
10. The Crowd Humbly Requests - 2:15
11. Mystery Train/Crossroads (Junior Parker/Robert Johnson) - 5:59
12. The Crowd Again Requests - 0:12
13. Little Red Rooster (Dixon) - 6:28
14. Tuning - 0:49
15. Gloria (Van Morrison) - 10:02
16. Tuning - 0:51
17. Touch Me (Robby Krieger) - 3:29
18. The Crystal Ship (Morrison) - 3:25

=== Disc two ===
1. Tuning - 0:48
2. Light My Fire (Krieger), (Morrison) - 13:53
3. The Crowd Requests Their Favourites - 0:57
4. Celebration of the Lizard (Morrison) - 14:59
5. A Request of the Management - 6:45
6. Soul Kitchen (Morrison) - 6:51
7. Jim Introduces Ray - 1:01
8. Close to You (Dixon) - 4:29
9. A Conversation With the Crowd - 2:12
10. Peace Frog [Instrumental](Morrison, Krieger) - 2:36
11. Blue Sunday (Morrison) - 2:38
12. Five to One (Morrison) - 5:47
13. The Crowd Again Requests Their Favorites - 0:44
14. Jim Introduces the Movie - 1:05
15. Rock Me Baby (B.B. King) - 7:38

== Personnel ==
- Jim Morrison - vocals
- Ray Manzarek - organ, keyboard bass & vocals on Close to You
- Robby Krieger - electric guitar
- John Densmore - drums
- Bruce Botnick - production and mastering
