= The Very Best of The Doors (2001 album) =

Greatest hits album by The Doors
- Released: September 18, 2001
- Recorded: 1966–1971
- Genres: Psychedelic rock; blues rock; acid rock; pop rock
- Length: 72:16
- Label: Elektra
- Producers: Paul A. Rothchild, Bruce Botnick, The Doors

The Doors chronology
Live at the Aquarius Theatre: The Second Performance (2001)	The Very Best of The Doors (2001)	No One Here Gets Out Alive (2001)

The Very Best of The Doors is a compilation album by the Doors, released in the US in 2001. It features the same cover art as The Best of The Doors compilation released the previous year, and a similar track listing to the single CD version of that album.

== Critical reception ==
Professional ratings
Review scores
Source	Rating
Christgau's Consumer Guide	A
The New Rolling Stone Album Guide	5/5 stars

Andy Hermann of PopMatters wrote in his review that with a few exceptions, The Very Best of the Doors is "as good an overview as any of the band's biggest hits and most important songs, all in their original album versions".

== Track listing ==
1. "Break On Through (To the Other Side)" – 2:29
2. "Light My Fire" – 7:08
3. "People Are Strange" – 2:12
4. "Riders on the Storm" – 7:15
5. "L.A. Woman" – 7:52
6. "Love Her Madly" – 3:20
7. "Back Door Man" – 3:34
8. "Touch Me" – 3:12
9. "Hello, I Love You" – 2:16
10. "Love Me Two Times" – 3:16
11. "Twentieth Century Fox" – 2:34
12. "The Crystal Ship" – 2:34
13. "The WASP (Texas Radio and the Big Beat)" – 4:15
14. "Peace Frog" – 3:00
15. "The End" – 11:45
16. "Roadhouse Blues" (Live) (Version found on The Doors: Box Set (1997) & Essential Rarities (1999)) – 4:32

== Personnel ==
- Jim Morrison – vocals
- Ray Manzarek – organ, piano, keyboards & bass
- Robby Krieger – guitar
- John Densmore – drums
- Paul A. Rothchild – producer of all tracks except for tracks 4–6 & 13
- Bruce Botnick – co-producer of tracks 4–6 & 13
- Jerry Scheff – bass guitar on tracks 4–6 & 13
- Douglass Lubahn – bass guitar on tracks 3 & 9–10
- Larry Knechtel (uncredited) – bass guitar on track 2
- Curtis Amy – saxophone solo on track 8
- George Bohanan – trombone
- Harvey Brooks – bass guitar on track 8
- Paul Harris – orchestral arrangements on track 8
- Ray Neapolitan – bass guitar on track 14
- Marc Benno – additional guitar on track 5
