= Live in Hollywood (The Doors album) =

Live album by The Doors
- Released: August 13, 2002
- Recorded: July 21, 1969
- Venues: Aquarius Theatre, Los Angeles Hollywood
- Genres: Psychedelic rock, acid rock, blues rock
- Length: 1:13:04
- Labels: Elektra, Bright Midnight Archives
- Producer: Bruce Botnick

The Doors chronology
No One Here Gets Out Alive (2001)	Live in Hollywood (2002)	Legacy: The Absolute Best (2003)

Professional ratings
Review scores
Source	Rating
AllMusic	3.5/5 stars
The Encyclopedia of Popular Music	3/5 stars
The New Rolling Stone Album Guide	3.5/5 stars

Live in Hollywood is a live album released American rock band by the Doors. It was recorded on July 21, 1969, at the Aquarius Theatre in Hollywood, California, and released in 2002. The album consists of excerpts from the second of two performances by the Doors at the Aquarius that day.

This is part of previously unreleased material of the Bright Midnight Archives collection of live albums by the Doors.

== Track listing ==
All songs written by the Doors except where noted.

1. "Welcome" − 0:21
2. "Back Door Man" (Chester Burnett, Willie Dixon) − 4:35
3. "Break On Through (To the Other Side)" (Jim Morrison) − 3:53
4. "When the Music's Over" − 12:08
5. "You Make Me Real" (Morrison) − 3:10
6. "Universal Mind" (Morrison) − 4:41
7. "Touch Me" (Robby Krieger) − 3:49
8. "Soul Kitchen" (Morrison) − 6:50
9. "Jim Introduces Ray" − 0:55
10. "Close to You" (Dixon) − 4:44
11. "What You'd Like to Hear?" − 0:38
12. "Peace Frog" (Instrumental) (Morrison, Krieger) − 2:36
13. "Blue Sunday" (Morrison) − 3:38
14. "Five to One" (Morrison) − 5:54
15. Celebration (Morrison) − 2:17
16. "Light My Fire" (Krieger, Morrison) − 13:54

== Personnel ==
- Jim Morrison - vocals
- Ray Manzarek – organ, keyboard bass & vocals on Close to You
- Robby Krieger – electric guitar
- John Densmore - drums
