= The Very Best of The Doors =

The Very Best of The Doors is the name of:

- The Very Best of The Doors (2001 album)
- The Very Best of The Doors (2007 album)

== See also ==
- The Best of The Doors (disambiguation)
