= Absolutely Live (The Doors album) =

Live album by the Doors
- Released: July 20, 1970
- Recorded: July 21, 1969, January 17 or 18, 1970, May 1, 1970, May 2, 1970, May 8, 1970
- Venues: Aquarius Theater, Hollywood, Felt Forum, New York City, Spectrum, Philadelphia, Pittsburgh Civic Arena, Pittsburgh, Cobo Arena, Detroit
- Genre: Rock
- Length: 77:02
- Label: Elektra
- Producer: Paul A. Rothchild

The Doors chronology
Morrison Hotel (1970)	Absolutely Live (1970)	13 (1970)

CD reissue cover

Absolutely Live is the first live album by the American rock band the Doors, released on July 20, 1970, by Elektra Records. The double album features songs recorded at concerts held in 1969 and 1970 in several U.S. cities. It includes the first full release of the performance piece "Celebration of the Lizard" and several other tracks that had not previously appeared on any official Doors release. The album peaked at number eight on the Billboard 200 in September 1970.

== Recording ==
Many shows were recorded during the band's 1970 Roadhouse Blues Tour to create the Absolutely Live album. The Doors' producer and longtime collaborator Paul A. Rothchild claimed to have painstakingly edited the album from many different shows to create one cohesive concert. According to Rothchild, the best part of a song from one performance may have been spliced together with another part of the same song from another performance, in an attempt to create "the ultimate concert". Rothchild said, "I couldn't get complete takes of a lot of songs, so sometimes I'd cut from Detroit to Philadelphia in mid-song. There must be 2,000 edits on that album." However, most of the tracks were taken from the Doors' performances at the Felt Forum in New York City on January 17 and 18, 1970.

Absolutely Live marks the first release of the Doors' performance piece "Celebration of the Lizard" in its entirety, which had originally been attempted in the studio during the Waiting for the Sun sessions but was eventually abandoned. The album also included several new songs: "Love Hides", "Build Me a Woman", "Universal Mind", "Dead Rats, Dead Cats" (performed as a preamble to "Break on Through") and cover versions of Bo Diddley's "Who Do You Love?" and Willie Dixon's "Close to You" (the latter featuring lead vocals by keyboardist Ray Manzarek).

Reflecting on the live album in an interview, Jim Morrison remarked, "I think [Absolutely Live is] a fairly true document of what the band sounds like on fairly good night. It's not the best we can do and it's certainly not the worst. It's a true document of an above average evening." In his autobiography, Manzarek explained the group's intentions with the album: "We wanted to get the Doors experience on tape. Live. One time. For the ages. And in doing so, perhaps we could capture the moment of escape. Live."

== Album cover ==
According to the biography No One Here Gets Out Alive, Morrison hated the album cover for Absolutely Live. He had changed his appearance dramatically since the band's early days, growing a beard and discarding his onstage leather attire in an attempt to overcome his "rock god" image, but was dismayed to find that his record label opted for an earlier photograph of him for the cover.

In his book Krautrocksampler, the British rock musician and writer Julian Cope described the photo of Morrison as one of his "two favorite all-time images of rock 'n' roll singers".

== Release and reception ==
Professional ratings
Review scores
Source	Rating
AllMusic	2/5 stars
Christgau's Record Guide	B
Classic Rock	4/5 stars
The Rolling Stone Album Guide	2.5/5 stars
Virgin Encyclopedia of Popular Music	2/5 stars

Absolutely Live sold only 225,000 copies, half of what their previous studio album Morrison Hotel had sold. Critic Gloria Vanjak of Rolling Stone magazine wrote a scathing review of the album, singling out Morrison's performance in particular and referring to "Celebration of the Lizard" as "rancid". Robert Christgau of The Village Voice gave a more favorable review, praising its "strong performances and audio," but concluded that "I don't happen to be into reptiles when the music's over, much less while it's on."

In a retrospective review for AllMusic, William Ruhlmann observed that the album "demonstrated that, in concert, the Doors could be an enervating as well as an elevating experience." However, he bemoaned the fact that Morrison seemed to "treat the whole exercise as a charade" and opined that several tracks "flag considerably in comparison to the sleeker studio versions." Writing for Classic Rock, critic Max Bell praised the album, noting that it remains the "organic documentary" that the band envisaged.

Julian Casablancas of the Strokes has cited the album track "Universal Mind" as a personal favorite of his.

=== Reissues ===
In 1991, Absolutely Live was issued on compact disc as part of the two-CD set In Concert, which also included the Doors' live albums Alive, She Cried and Live at the Hollywood Bowl. Absolutely Live was later reissued as a single CD by Elektra in 1996, featuring new artwork different from the original LP. In 2010, it was reissued on 180-gram vinyl by Rhino Records in its original double LP format and featuring its original artwork, in both the U.S. and UK.

== Track listing ==
Songwriters' and LP side total lengths' mentions are taken from the original 1970 Elektra Records album (individual song timings are not listed) and may differ from other sources.

Side one
No.	Title	Writer(s)	Length
1.	"Who Do You Love?"	Ellas McDaniel	8:42
2.	"Medley": "Alabama Song (Whiskey Bar)"; "Back Door Man"; "Love Hides"; "Five to One"	Kurt Weill, Bertolt Brecht; Willie Dixon; Jim Morrison; Morrison, the Doors	10:35
Total length:			19:17

Side two
No.	Title	Writer(s)	Length
1.	"Build Me a Woman"	Morrison, the Doors	3:33
2.	"When the Music's Over"	Morrison, the Doors	14:49
Total length:			18:33

Side three
No.	Title	Writer(s)	Length
1.	"Close to You"	Dixon	5:27
2.	"Universal Mind"	Morrison, Robby Krieger	4:54
3.	"Break On Thru, #2"	Morrison, the Doors	7:26
Total length:			18:00

Side four
No.	Title	Writer(s)	Length
1.	"Celebration of the Lizard"	Morrison, the Doors	14:28
2.	"Soul Kitchen"	Morrison	7:15
Total length:			21:42

== Personnel ==
Per liner notes:

The Doors

- Jim Morrison – vocals
- Ray Manzarek – organ, keyboard bass, lead vocals on "Close to You", backing vocals
- Robby Krieger – guitar
- John Densmore – drums

Technical

- Paul A. Rothchild – producer
- Bruce Botnick – engineer

Remote recording facilities: Fedco Audio Labs and Wally Heider Recording

== Charts ==
Chart (1970)	Peak position
Canada Top Albums/CDs (RPM)	10
UK Albums (Official Charts)	69
US Billboard 200	8
Chart (2014)	Peak position
Hungarian Albums (MAHASZ)	31

== Certifications ==
Region	Certification	Certified units/sales
Australia (ARIA)	Gold	35,000^{^}
Austria (IFPI Austria)	Gold	25,000^{*}
Canada (Music Canada)	Gold	50,000^{^}
France (SNEP)	Gold	100,000^{*}
United States (RIAA)	Gold	500,000^{^}
^{*} Sales figures based on certification alone.^{^} Shipments figures based on certification alone.
