= Stoned Immaculate: The Music of The Doors =

Stoned Immaculate: The Music of the Doors

Compilation album by Various artists
- Released: November 14, 2000
- Recorded: 2000
- Genre: Rock
- Length: 71:45
- Label: Elektra Entertainment Group
- Producer: Ralph Sall

Professional ratings
Review scores
Source	Rating
AllMusic	3/5 stars

Stoned Immaculate: The Music of The Doors is a tribute album dedicated to the Doors. Producer Ralph Sall gathered an assortment of artists for the record. Unusually, the surviving members of The Doors played on this tribute record. In addition, recordings of Jim Morrison were used posthumously, in the creation of some of the tracks. In another example of posthumous usage, the cover features a painting by Rick Griffin. The album title is a lyric taken from the song "The WASP (Texas Radio and the Big Beat)."

== Track listing ==
All songs were written by the Doors.

No.	Title	Performed by	Length
1.	"Break On Through" (Stone Temple Pilots)	Scott Weiland, Dean DeLeo, Robert DeLeo, Eric Kretz, Robby Krieger and Ray Manzarek	3:47
2.	"Riders on the Storm" (Creed)	Scott Stapp, Brian Marshall, Scott Phillips, Mark Tremonti, Robby Krieger and Jamie Muhoberac	6:18
3.	"Light My Fire" (Train)	Charlie Colin, Rob Hotchkiss, Pat Monahan, Jimmy Stafford, Scott Underwood and Ralph Sall	3:43
4.	"Peace Frog" (Smash Mouth)	Steven Harwell, Greg Camp, Paul De Lisle, Kevin Coleman, Robby Krieger, Michael Klooster, DJ Homicide and Ralph Sall	3:02
5.	"L.A. Woman" (Days of the New)	Travis Meeks, Robby Krieger, YOGI, Bob Glaub, Greg Kurstin and Ray Rizzo	3:47
6.	"Love Me Two Times" (Aerosmith)	Steven Tyler, Joe Perry, Brad Whitford, Tom Hamilton, Joey Kramer, Robby Krieger and Ray Manzarek	3:20
7.	"Under Waterfall" (The Doors)	Jim Morrison, Ray Manzarek, Robby Krieger, John Densmore and Ralph Sall	3:12
8.	"Wild Child" (The Cult)	Ian Astbury, Billy Duffy, Matt Sorum, Ray Manzarek, Danny Saber and Scott Breadman	3:22
9.	"Roadhouse Rap" (A recording of Morrison speaking, taken from the original "Roadhouse Blues" sessions)	Jim Morrison	1:03
10.	"Roadhouse Blues"	John Lee Hooker, Jim Morrison, Robby Krieger, Ray Manzarek, John Densmore, DJ Bonebrake, Flea, Gregg Arreguin, John "Juke" Logan and Ralph Sall	5:34
11.	"Is Everybody In?" (This track features Burroughs speaking one of Morrison's poems over loops created from original Doors recordings, mixed with new material)	William S. Burroughs, Robby Krieger, Ray Manzarek, John Densmore and Ralph Sall	2:43
12.	"Hello, I Love You" (Oleander)	Ric Ivanisevich, Doug Eldridge, Fred Nelson, Robby Krieger and Dale Alexander	2:36
13.	"Touch Me" (Ian Astbury)	Ian Astbury, Robby Krieger, Ray Manzarek, John Densmore, Phil Chen, Bruce Fowler, Walter Fowler, Lawrence Klimath, Clarence Wears, Robert Greenridge and Vincent Charles	4:38
14.	"Children of Night"	Perry Farrell, Exene, Robby Krieger, Ray Manzarek, John Densmore and Ralph Sall	3:02
15.	"Love Her Madly"	Bo Diddley, Robby Krieger, Ray Manzarek, John Densmore, Bob Glaub, Alexandra Brown, Mona Lisa Young and Jackie Simley	4:54
16.	"The Cosmic Movie" (The Doors)	Jim Morrison, Robby Krieger, Ray Manzarek, John Densmore and Ralph Sall	3:03
17.	"The End" (Days of the New)	Travis Meeks, Robby Krieger, John Densmore, Rob Wasserman, Jamie Muhobaric and Ron Wagner	16:04

== Personnel ==
- Coordinator [Music] – James Sall
- Edited by (digitally) – Stewart Whitmore for Marcussen Mastering Hollywood
- Engineer – Eddie Miller
- Mastered by – Stephen Marcussen
- Mixed by – Eddie Miller, Ralph Sall
- Producer, Executive-Producer, Concept – Ralph Sall
