= No One Here Gets Out Alive (album) =

Box set by the Doors
- Released: November 20, 2001
- Recorded: 1965–1971
- Genres: Psychedelic rock, acid rock, blues-rock, hard rock
- Length: 183:25
- Label: Rhino – Bright Midnight Archives
- Producers: Bruce Botnick and The Doors

The Doors chronology
The Very Best of The Doors (2001)	No One Here Gets Out Alive (2001)	Live in Hollywood (2002)

No One Here Gets Out Alive is a box set by the band the Doors, released in 2001.

The box set consists of four shows, one on each disc, of a syndicated radio show called Innerview. The show was a music interview series that was hosted by Los Angeles disc jockey Jim Ladd.

The box set consists of music by the Doors and interviews of the surviving members of the band. Various topics are discussed, even the possibility of singer Jim Morrison being alive and well in Africa. Guitarist Robbie Kreiger answers the question regarding Morrison being alive after the tape recorder has been switched off, effectively furthering the Morrison myth.

== Production ==
The shows themselves took two years to produce and aired around the same time the book of the same name was released; during the summer of 1979. Each week, a new one-hour episode would air, spanning four weeks.

The shows were initially released as a limited edition vinyl box set. The release was limited to 150 copies, many of which were kept by the radio station employees themselves. The CD box set was mastered by Bruce Botnick from the vinyl discs in the possession of then Doors manager Danny Sugerman's younger brother, Chip Sugerman. The vinyl source of the discs is noticeable in places.

All commercials present on the original vinyl records have been removed, with each disc thus ending up at roughly 45 minutes.

== Track listing ==
=== Disc 1 - Beginning Of The Doors: Visionary Dream ===
1. Segment I - 14:36
2. Segment II - 9:26
3. Segment III - 8:13
4. Segment IV - 14:39

=== Disc 2 - Exploration And Morrison's Sojourn ===
1. Segment I - 10:23
2. Segment II - 13:08
3. Segment III - 15:13
4. Segment IV - 8:03

=== Disc 3 - Cultural Excursion Into The Void ===
1. Segment I - 9:48
2. Segment II - 13:36
3. Segment III - 10:44
4. Segment IV - 11:46

=== Disc 4 - James Douglas Morrison: Poet ===
1. Segment I - 10:14
2. Segment II - 12:12
3. Segment III - 13:11
4. Segment IV - 11:08

== Personnel ==
- Jim Morrison — lead vocals
- Ray Manzarek — piano, organ, keyboards & bass
- John Densmore — drums
- Robby Krieger — guitar
