= The Best of The Doors =

The Best of The Doors may refer to:

- The Best of The Doors (1973 album), a 1973 compilation album by The Doors.
- The Best of The Doors (1985 album), a 1985 compilation album by The Doors.
- The Best of The Doors (2000 album), a 2000 compilation album by The Doors.

== See also ==
- The Very Best of The Doors (disambiguation)
