= Strange Days (The Doors album) =

Studio album by the Doors
- Released: September 25, 1967
- Recorded: February 7 – August 24, 1967
- Studios: Sunset Sound, Hollywood
- Genres: Acid rock; psychedelic rock; psychedelic pop; psychedelia
- Length: 34:49
- Label: Elektra
- Producer: Paul A. Rothchild

The Doors chronology
The Doors (1967)	Strange Days (1967)	Waiting for the Sun (1968)

Singles from Strange Days
- 1. "People Are Strange" Released: September 1967; 2. "Love Me Two Times" Released: November 1967

Strange Days is the second studio album by the American rock band the Doors, released on September 25, 1967 by Elektra Records. Arriving eight months after the successful release of their self-titled debut album, on this record the band started experimenting with both new and old material in early 1967. Upon release, Strange Days reached number three on the US Billboard 200, and eventually earned a platinum certification from the Recording Industry Association of America (RIAA). It contains two Top 30 hit singles, "People Are Strange" and "Love Me Two Times".

Despite the album's failure to match the success of its predecessor, it was "arguably the one the band itself most appreciated musically and creatively", according to David V. Moskowitz. Music journalist Stephen Davis considers Strange Days the best Doors album and "one of the great artifacts of the rock movement."

== Recording and concept ==
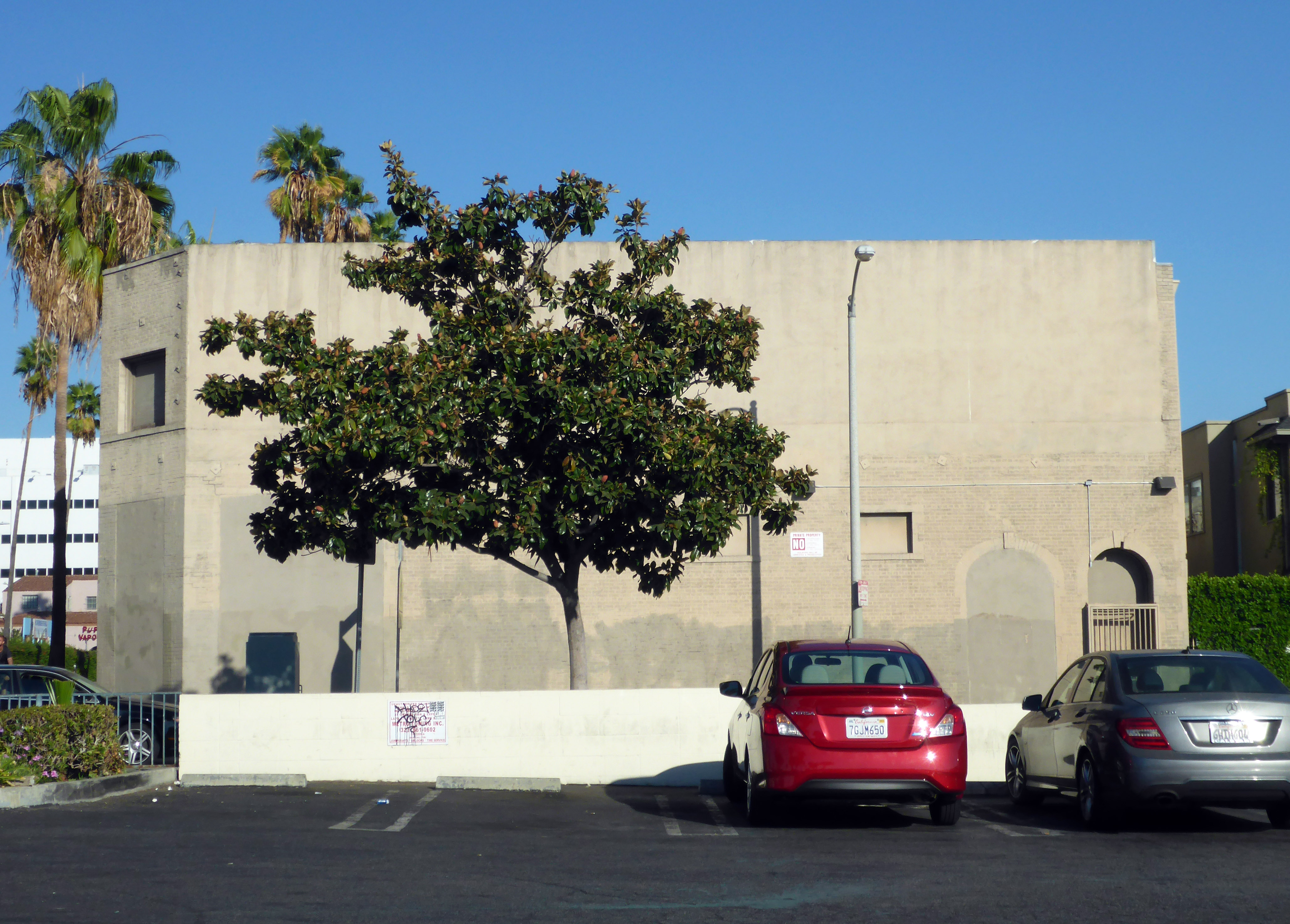
Like the previous record, the album's recording took place at Sunset Sound Recorders in Hollywood, California

Strange Days was recorded during tour breaks between February and August 1967 at Sunset Sound Recorders in Hollywood (the same studio as their first LP). In contrast to the 1966 sessions, producer Paul A. Rothchild and engineer Bruce Botnick employed a then cutting-edge 8-track recording machine. The protracted sessions allowed the band to experiment in the studio and further augment their sound with unusual instrumentation and sonic manipulation. Botnick said that the Doors were determined to pursue "new techniques of recording. No holds barred."

I started reading the music on the lower right hand side and read right to left across the bottom line, and then jumped to the next line. When I got to the end of the previous line, I jumped to the next line up on the right-hand side, reading everything backwards, bottom to top.

— Ray Manzarek, explaining his keyboard playing on "Unhappy Girl".

Unlike The Doors, Strange Days incorporates various instruments, ranging from marimba to Moog synthesizer, which has been described as one of the first uses of the synth in rock music history. The contribution of the synthesizer was programmed with the help of Paul Beaver and played by lead singer Jim Morrison. Session musician Doug Lubahn occasionally played bass during the recording of the album.

The band explored musique concrète techniques during the album's recording sessions. While recording "Unhappy Girl" for example, keyboardist Ray Manzarek played his keyboard introduction backwards, and the corresponding overdubs were later made. On the track "Horse Latitudes", Botnick took the white noise of a tape recorder and varied the speed by hand-winding it (resulting in a sound akin to wind) as the four band members played a variety of instruments in unusual ways. Further varispeed was then employed to create different timbres and effects.

Also recorded during the album sessions are the songs "Summer's Almost Gone" and "We Could Be So Good Together", both of which were ultimately left off the album but included on the subsequent album, Waiting for the Sun in 1968.

== Composition ==
Strange Days has been described alternately by music critics as acid rock, psychedelic pop, psychedelic rock, or simply psychedelia; Barney Hoskyns labeled it as "post-psychedelic pop". Several of the album's songs had been written around the same time as the ones that appeared on The Doors. Two ("My Eyes Have Seen You" and "Moonlight Drive") had been demoed in 1965 at Trans World Pacific Studios before Robby Krieger joined the group; indeed, the latter had been conceived by Morrison prior to his fateful reunion with Manzarek in the summer of 1965. Although the song was attempted twice during the sessions for the band's debut, both versions were deemed unsatisfactory. A conventional blues arrangement, "Moonlight Drive" features a defining slightly off-beat rhythm and Krieger's bottleneck guitar, which create an eerie sound.

The LP's first single, "People Are Strange", was composed in early 1967 after Krieger, drummer John Densmore, and a depressed Morrison had walked to the top of Laurel Canyon. Densmore recalled the song's writing process in his book Riders on the Storm: Densmore and Krieger, who had then been roommates, were visited by a seemingly dejected Morrison. At the suggestion of Densmore, they took a walk along Laurel Canyon. Morrison returned from the walk "euphoric" with the early lyrics of "People Are Strange".

Although Morrison was the Doors' primary songwriter, Krieger wrote several of the group's hit singles, with his first composition being "Light My Fire". His bluesy "Love Me Two Times" was about a soldier/sailor on his last day with his girlfriend before shipping out, ostensibly to war. Manzarek said lyrically the song can be about "lust and loss, or multiple orgasms, I'm not sure which." Manzarek played the final version of this song on a harpsichord, which Manzarek described as "a most elegant instrument that one does not normally associate with rock and roll." It was edited to a 2:37 length and released as the second single (after "People Are Strange") from the album, and reached No. 25 on the charts in the US. Upon release, "Love Me Two Times" was considered to be somewhat risqué for radio airplay, and was banned in New Haven, Connecticut, for being "too controversial", much to the dismay of the band.

"Horse Latitudes" showcases Morrison's spoken-word poetry, who confirmed that he penned the poem during his high school years. However, Manzarek had mentioned that he never believed he wrote "Horse Latitudes" at such a young age, claiming the words were "too mature". The album concludes with the 11 minute-long epic, "When the Music's Over", whose keyboard part was inspired by Herbie Hancock's "Watermelon Man".

== Release and packaging ==
Strange Days was the best album ... It said everything we were trying to say musically and it contains some of Jim's best poetry ... We were confident it was going to be bigger than anything the Beatles have ever done. But there was no single. The record died on us. It never really conquered like it should have.

— Producer Paul A. Rothchild.

I'm really proud of our second record [Strange Days] because ... It tells a story. It's a whole effort. Someday will get the recognition it deserves. You know? I don't think many people were aware of what we were doing.

— Lead singer Jim Morrison, in a 1970 interview with Downbeat Magazine.

Strange Days was released on September 25, 1967, by Elektra Records. Although the album was quite successful, reaching No. 3 in the United States during a sixty-three-week chart stay in November 1967, its impact was attenuated by the enduring success of the band's debut album, which remained in the Top Ten over ten months after its release during a 122-week stay. According to music journalist Stephen Davis, Strange Days also proved to be the Doors' "worst-selling album" in their career with Morrison.

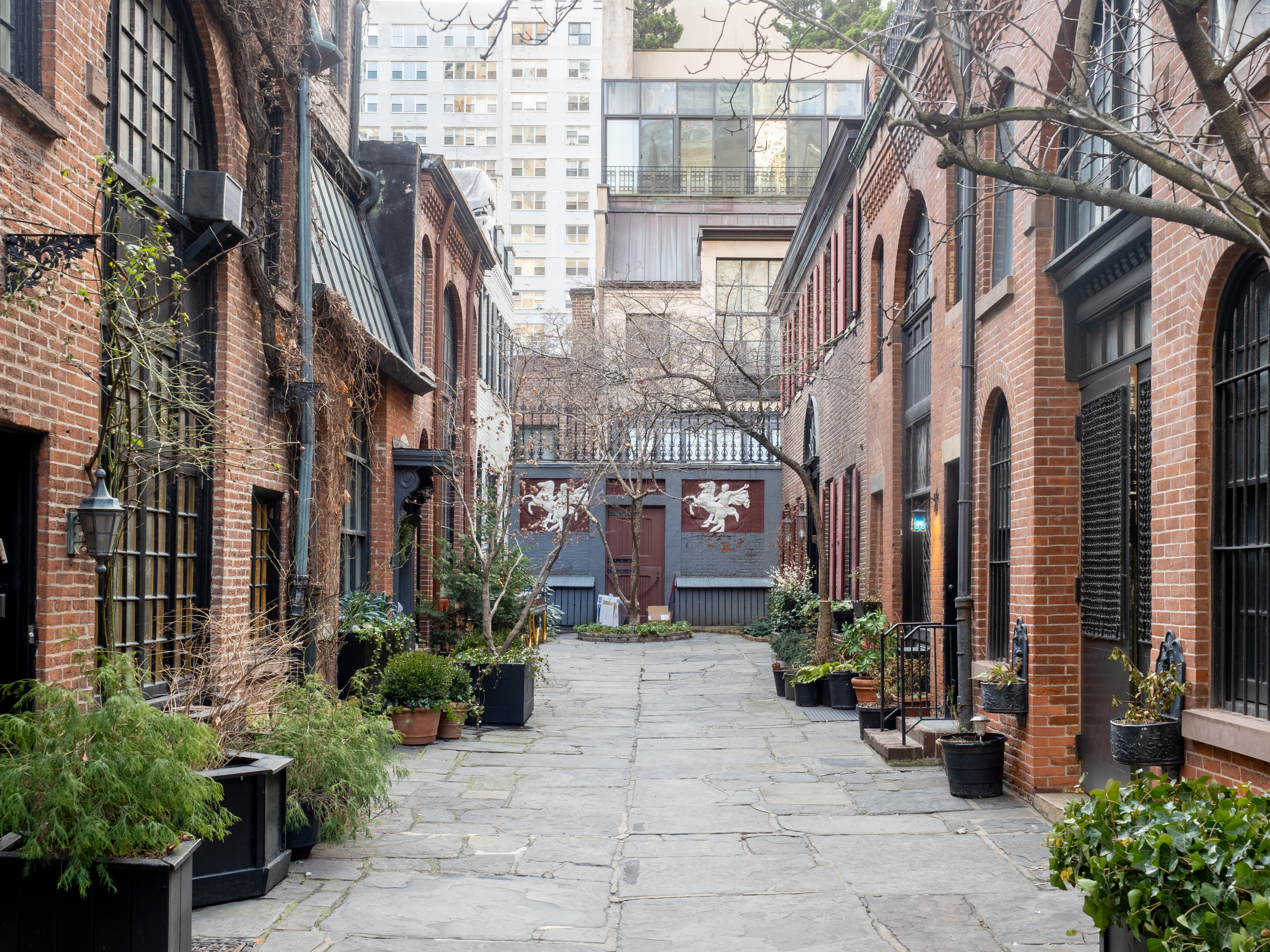
Sniffen Court, the location where the album cover was taken

The album cover of Strange Days, photographed by Joel Brodsky, depicts a group of street performers in New York. The location of the photograph is at Sniffen Court, a residential alley next to East 36th Street between Lexington and Third Avenue in Manhattan. Actual street performers could not be located for all of the designated roles, so Brodsky's assistant stood in as a juggler while a random cab driver was paid $5 to pose playing the trumpet. Twin dwarfs were hired, with one appearing on the front cover and the other appearing on the back cover, which is the other half of the same photo on the front cover. A group shot of the band appears on a poster in the background of both covers, bearing captions of the band and album name. (The same photograph previously appeared on the back cover of the band's debut album.) Because of the subtlety of the artist and album title, most record stores put stickers across the cover to help customers identify it more clearly.

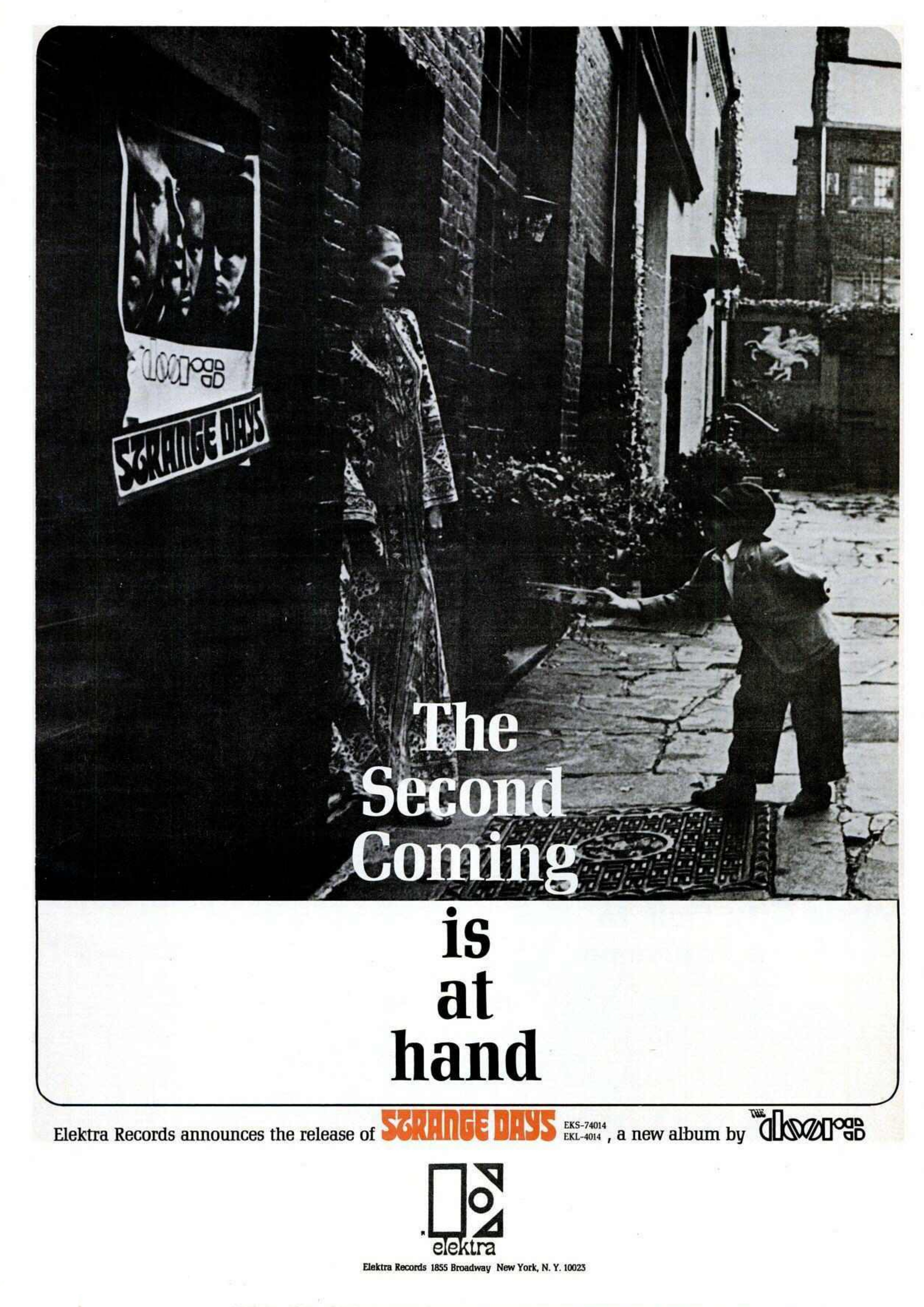
Billboard advertisement, October 28, 1967

== Critical reception ==
Professional ratings
Retrospective reviews
Review scores
Source	Rating
AllMusic	3.5/5 stars
Classic Rock	3.5/5 stars
Encyclopedia of Popular Music	3/5 stars
The Great Rock Discography	8/10
MusicHound Rock	3.5/5 stars
Music Story	5/5 stars
The Rolling Stone Album Guide	(Note: The Rolling Stone Record Guide (1979, 1st ed.).) (Note: The New Rolling Stone Record Guide (1983, 2nd ed.).) (Note: The Rolling Stone Album Guide (1992, 3rd ed.) and (The New) Rolling Stone Album Guide (2004, 4th ed.).)
Slant Magazine	4.5/5 stars
Tom Hull – on the Web	B+

Professional ratings
50th Anniversary Edition
Review scores
Source	Rating
Classic Rock	(Note: Rating given by the British edition of Classic Rock.); 10/10 (Note: Rating given by the German edition of Classic Rock.)
PopMatters	9/10
Record Collector	2/5 stars
Rolling Stone Germany	4.5/5 stars

Apart from its lower commercial performance compared to The Doors, contemporary reviews for Strange Days were generally positive. Rolling Stone opined that the album "has all the power and energy of the first LP, but is more subtle, more intricate and much more effective" and argued that the "whole album, individual songs and especially the final track are constructed in the five parts of tragedy. Like Greek drama, you know when the music's over because there is catharsis." Gene Youngblood of L.A. Free Press wrote a glowing review, describing the Doors' music as "more surreal than psychedelic, it is more anguish than acid." Robert Christgau called the album "muscular but misshapen" in a May 1968 column for Esquire, but went on to write that the Doors had come "from nowhere to reign as America's heaviest group".

Retrospective reviews to the album have been equally favorable. In 2007, on the occasion of the release of the 40th anniversary edition, Sal Cinquemani of Slant Magazine, argued that "while The Doors had more frequent, obvious peaks, the quirky Strange Days is a more ambitious, unified work. There are fewer filler tracks and each song carries as much weight as the one before and after it" and called it "a document of a sometimes beautiful, sometimes scary, and often twisted era of fear and idealism." It has also been ranked high on lists; in 2012, the record was listed at No. 409 on Rolling Stone magazine's list of The 500 Greatest Albums of All Time, and the same magazine included it on their 2007 list "The 40 Essential Albums of 1967". Strange Days was placed at No. 20 on Ultimate Classic Rock's list of the "Top 25 Psychedelic Rock Albums", while Q magazine ranked it 35th on their respective list.

Some critics feel it does not quite match up to its predecessor. The Rolling Stone Album Guide wrote, "With the exceptions of hard blues, 'Love Me Two Times,' and the rock tango, 'Moonlight Drive,' Strange Days didn't have the power of The Doors". In his retrospective AllMusic review of the album, Richie Unterberger notes, "Many of the songs on Strange Days had been written around the same time as the ones that appeared on The Doors, and with hindsight one has the sense that the best of the batch had already been cherry picked for the debut album. For that reason, the band's second effort isn't as consistently stunning as their debut," but he went on to write that overall "it's a very successful continuation of the themes of their classic album."

Strange Days and its songs influenced paintings by artist George Condo in 2023.

== Track listing ==
=== Original album ===
All tracks are written by the Doors (Jim Morrison, Ray Manzarek, Robby Krieger and John Densmore). Details are taken from the 1967 U.S. Elektra release; other releases may show different information.

Side one
No.	Title	Length
1.	"Strange Days"	3:05
2.	"You're Lost Little Girl"	3:01
3.	"Love Me Two Times"	3:23
4.	"Unhappy Girl"	2:00
5.	"Horse Latitudes"	1:30
6.	"Moonlight Drive"	3:00

Side two
No.	Title	Length
1.	"People Are Strange"	2:10
2.	"My Eyes Have Seen You"	2:22
3.	"I Can't See Your Face in My Mind"	3:18
4.	"When the Music's Over"	11:00
Total length:		34:49

=== Reissues ===
40th Anniversary Edition CD Bonus Tracks
No.	Title	Length
11.	"People Are Strange" (False starts & studio dialogue)	1:42
12.	"Love Me Two Times" (Take 3)	3:35

50th Anniversary Edition Second CD: Original Mono Album Mix
No.	Title	Length
1.	"Strange Days"	3:08
2.	"You're Lost Little Girl"	3:02
3.	"Love Me Two Times"	3:17
4.	"Unhappy Girl"	2:00
5.	"Horse Latitudes"	1:35
6.	"Moonlight Drive"	3:03
7.	"People Are Strange"	2:13
8.	"My Eyes Have Seen You"	2:27
9.	"I Can't See Your Face in My Mind"	3:26
10.	"When the Music's Over"	11:00

== Personnel ==
The liner notes for the 1967 U.S. Elektra album and the 2007 Rhino Records CD 40th Anniversary Edition liner notes with accompanying essays by Bruce Botnick and Barney Hoskyns may differ from other sources.

The Doors

- Jim Morrison – vocals, Moog synthesizer on "Strange Days"
- Ray Manzarek – keyboards, marimba
- Robby Krieger – guitar
- John Densmore – drums

Additional musicians

- Doug Lubahn – bass guitar (except on "Unhappy Girl", "Horse Latitudes" and "When the Music's Over")

Technical

- Paul A. Rothchild – production
- Bruce Botnick – engineering
- Joel Brodsky – cover photography
- William S. Harvey – cover concept and art direction
- Paul Beaver – Moog synthesizer programming for "Strange Days"

== Charts ==
Album (1967)

Chart	Peak
US Billboard 200	3

Chart performance for Strange Days 1967: A Work In Progress, Part 2
Chart (2026)	Peak position
Greek Albums (IFPI)	88
Hungarian Physical Albums (MAHASZ)	7

Singles

Year	Single (A-side / B-side)	Chart	Peak
1967	"People Are Strange" / "Unhappy Girl"	Billboard Hot 100	12
1967	"Love Me Two Times" / "Moonlight Drive"	Hot 100	25

== Certifications ==
Region	Certification	Certified units/sales
Canada (Music Canada)	Platinum	100,000^{^}
France (SNEP)	2× Gold	200,000^{*}
Germany (BVMI)	Gold	250,000^{^}
Italy (FIMI)	Gold	25,000^{‡}
United Kingdom (BPI)	Gold	100,000^{^}
United States (RIAA)	Platinum	1,000,000^{^}
^{*} Sales figures based on certification alone.^{^} Shipments figures based on certification alone.^{‡} Sales+streaming figures based on certification alone.

== See also ==
- Outline of the Doors
