= Live in Hollywood: Highlights from the Aquarius Theater Performances =

Live in Hollywood: Highlights from the Aquarius Theatre Performances

Live album by The Doors
- Released: 2001
- Recorded: July 21, 1969
- Venue: Aquarius Theatre, Los Angeles Hollywood
- Genre: Psychedelic rock, acid rock, blues rock
- Length: 56:39
- Label: Rhino, Bright Midnight Archives
- Producer: Bruce Botnick

The Doors chronology
Bright Midnight: Live in America (2001)	Live in Hollywood: Highlights from the Aquarius Theatre Performances (2001)	Live at the Aquarius Theatre: The First Performance (2001)

Professional ratings
Review scores
Source	Rating
Allmusic link	2.5/5 stars

Live in Hollywood: Highlights from the Aquarius Theater Performances is a compilation live album released by the band the Doors, live in Hollywood. The album was released in 2001 by the label of Bright Midnight Archives. Is the first of five albums released by the Doors of the live recordings in the Aquarius Theatre.

This is part of previously unreleased material of the Bright Midnight Archives collection of live albums by the Doors.

== Track listings ==
All songs written by the Doors except where noted.

1. Introductions - 1:17
2. I Will Never Be Untrue (Jim Morrison) - 3:42
3. Build Me a Woman (Morrison) - 5:24
4. Who Do You Love? (Bo Diddley) - 7:43
5. Little Red Rooster (Willie Dixon) - 6:29
6. Gloria (Van Morrison) - 10:04
7. Touch Me (Robby Krieger) - 3:29
8. The Crystal Ship (Morrison) - 4:03
9. Close to You (Dixon) - 7:03
10. Rock Me Baby (B.B. King) - 7:21

== Personnel ==
- Jim Morrison - lead vocals
- Ray Manzarek - organ, keyboard bass, lead vocals on Close to You
- Robby Krieger - electric guitar
- John Densmore - drums
