= Roadhouse Blues Tour =

1970 tour by The Doors

- Promotional tour by the Doors
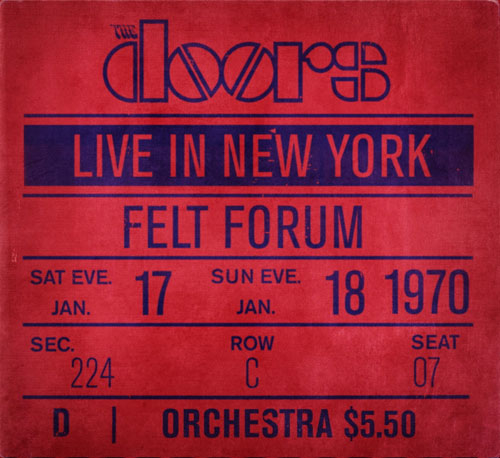
- A ticket for the Felt Forum, New York concert, one of the tour's performances
- Location: North America; Europe
- Start date: January 1970
- End date: August 1970
- No. of shows: 26

The Roadhouse Blues Tour was a 1970 tour by the American rock band the Doors. The group recorded many of the concerts which have been subsequently released through Elektra Records, Rhino Records and Bright Midnight Records.

== Background ==
Following the Doors' controversial concert in Miami, Florida, in 1969 where lead singer Jim Morrison performed while he was intoxicated (and led to the majority of their concerts being cancelled for the rest of the year) the band started touring in 1970 to promote their upcoming album, Morrison Hotel. The tour began in January 1970, and ended in August of the same year.

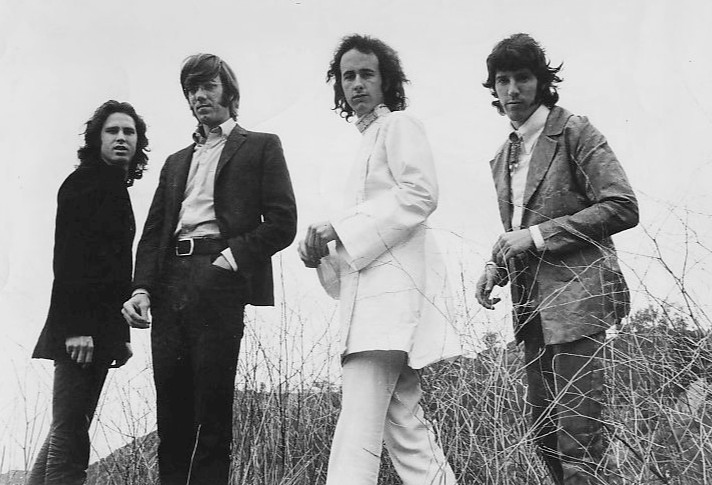
All four members of the Doors in 1968

Throughout the first half of 1970, the Doors played 20 dates in the United States and Canada and one date at the Isle of Wight Festival. The tour started with concerts held on January 17 and 18, 1970 in New York City at the Felt Forum. Some of the recordings from these shows were later released on the live album Absolutely Live. One such performance of that concert included an extended version of "The End" in which Morrison incorporated the line "Bring out your dead". The Doors were accompanied by Harvey Brooks on bass, the only time the Doors performed live with a bass player.

The tour's last concert was performed on August 29, 1970 at the Isle of Wight Festival. The band played alongside Jimi Hendrix, the Who, Joni Mitchell, Jethro Tull, Taste, Leonard Cohen, Miles Davis, Emerson, Lake & Palmer and Sly and the Family Stone. Two of their songs from the show were featured in the 1995 documentary Message to Love.

== Tour dates ==
Per sources:

Date	City	Country	Venue	Notes
January 17, 1970	New York City	United States	Felt Forum	2 shows
January 18, 1970	New York City	United States	Felt Forum	2 shows
February 5, 1970	San Francisco	United States	Winterland Arena	
February 6, 1970	San Francisco	United States	Winterland Arena	
February 7, 1970	Long Beach	United States	Long Beach Arena	
February 13, 1970	Cleveland	United States	Allen Theatre	2 shows
February 14, 1970	Cleveland	United States	Allen Theatre	
February 15, 1970	Chicago	United States	Auditorium Theatre	2 shows
April 10, 1970	Boston	United States	Boston Arena	2 shows
April 12, 1970	Denver	United States	University of Denver Arena	
April 18, 1970	Honolulu	United States	Honolulu International Centre	
May 1, 1970	Philadelphia	United States	Spectrum	
May 2, 1970	Pittsburgh	United States	Pittsburgh Civic Arena	
May 8, 1970	Detroit	United States	Cobo Arena	
May 9, 1970	Columbus	United States	Veterans Memorial Auditorium	
May 10, 1970	Baltimore	United States	Baltimore Civic Center	
June 5, 1970	Seattle	United States	Seattle Center Coliseum	
June 6, 1970	Vancouver	Canada	Pacific Coliseum	
August 21, 1970	Bakersfield	United States	Bakersfield Civic Auditorium	
August 22, 1970	San Diego	United States	International Sports Center	
August 29, 1970	Afton Down	United Kingdom	Isle of Wight Festival	

== See also ==
- Outline of the Doors
