= Moonlight Drive =

Single by the Doors

from the album Strange Days
- A-side: "Love Me Two Times"
- Released: September 25, 1967
- Recorded: May–August 1967
- Genre: Blues rock
- Length: 2:16 (single); 3:00 (album version)
- Label: Elektra
- Songwriter: The Doors
- Producer: Paul A. Rothchild

The Doors singles chronology
"People Are Strange" (1967)	"Moonlight Drive" (1967)	"The Unknown Soldier" (1968)

"Moonlight Drive" is a song by American rock band the Doors, released in 1967 on their second album Strange Days. It was edited to a 2:16 length for the 45 rpm single B-side of "Love Me Two Times". Though a conventional blues arrangement, the track's defining feature was its slightly off-beat rhythm, and Robby Krieger's "bottleneck" or slide guitar, which creates an eerie sound.

== Composition ==
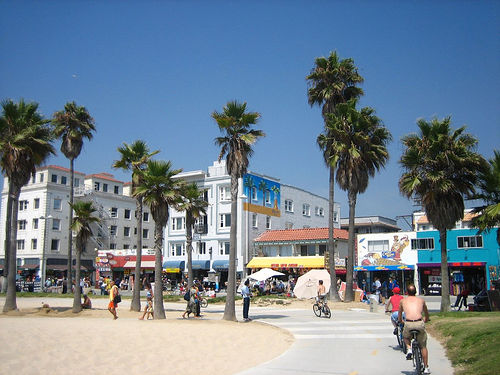
Venice Beach, Los Angeles, where Ray Manzarek and Jim Morrison met

The song is one of the first written by the lead singer Jim Morrison. According to the Jerry Hopkins and Danny Sugerman biography No One Here Gets Out Alive, Morrison wrote "Moonlight Drive” during his halcyon days on a rooftop in Venice Beach, Los Angeles, California, in 1965. Later on, when he happened upon his friend and future band member, Ray Manzarek, he uttered the memorable lines, "Let's swim to the moon, let's climb through the tide, penetrate the evening that the city sleeps to hide." Reportedly Manzarek was awestruck, and they decided to form a band. Morrison already had a band name picked out: the Doors.

"Moonlight Drive" was recorded along with other songs during the group's first demo recordings at Trans World Pacific Studios. It was recorded the following year for the band's eponymous debut album, but eventually did not appear; this was due to the band members' dissatisfaction with the result, which differ from the later album version. This version was finally released as an outtake, on the 40th Anniversary edition of the debut album.

== Performances ==
Recordings of live performances of the song reveal a link to a sort of death by drowning – whether murder, suicide or simply going too far. Morrison sings in live performances, probably improvising, referring to "fishes for your friends" and "pearls for your eyes" conjuring an image of a rotten corpse lying at the bottom of the ocean while simultaneously referring to Shakespeare. Morrison also read the Strange Days poem "Horse Latitudes" during live performances of the song, before repeating the final lines of the song's third verse, as demonstrated on the version that first appeared on Alive, She Cried.

== Personnel ==
The Doors

- Jim Morrison – vocals
- Ray Manzarek – hohner clavinet, tack piano
- Robby Krieger – bottleneck guitar
- John Densmore – drums

Additional musicians

- Doug Lubahn – bass guitar
- Paul Beaver – moog synthesizer sound effects
