= Love Me Two Times =

Single by the Doors

from the album Strange Days
- B-side: "Moonlight Drive"
- Released: November 1967
- Recorded: April 1967
- Genre: Rock; blues rock; folk rock; pop
- Length: 3:16 (album version); 2:37 (single version)
- Label: Elektra
- Songwriter: The Doors
- Producer: Paul A. Rothchild

The Doors singles chronology
"People Are Strange" (1967)	"Love Me Two Times" (1967)	"The Unknown Soldier" (1968)

"Love Me Two Times" is a song by the American rock band the Doors. First appearing on their second studio album Strange Days, it was later edited to a 2:37 length and released as the second single (after "People Are Strange") from that album. The single reached number 25 on the charts in the United States.

"Love Me Two Times" was considered to be somewhat risqué for radio airplay, being banned in New Haven for being "too controversial", much to the dismay of the band.

== Composition ==
As with the other songs on Strange Days, the album liner notes list the songwriters as the Doors as does the "Love Me Two Times" single; the performance rights organization ASCAP shows the writers as the individual Doors members.

"Love Me Two Times" incorporates elements from blues and baroque music, and has been classified as a rock, pop, folk rock and blues rock song. In an interview with Guitar World's Alan Paul, Doors guitarist Robby Krieger said the song's musical idea came from a lick on one of Danny Kalb's compositions. Keyboardist Ray Manzarek played the final version of the song on a harpsichord, which has often been mistaken for a clavichord. Manzarek described the instrument as "a most elegant instrument that one does not normally associate with rock and roll."

=== Lyrics ===
In his autobiography, Manzarek described the song as "Robby [Krieger]'s great blues/rock classic about lust and loss, or multiple orgasms, I'm not sure which". According to author Rich Weidman, the song is about a sailor or soldier spending one last day with his girlfriend before shipping out to war.

== Critical reception ==
In an AllMusic album review of Strange Days, critic Richie Unterberger described "Love Me Two Times" as "jerkily rhythmic", while Rolling Stone called the song a "heavy, evocative and climactic piece". Sal Cinquemani of Slant Magazine also proclaimed that the song is the album's "most accessible, straightforward rock tune", and praised its "virtuosic harpsichord solo and one of the band's grooviest guitar riffs." Billboard described the single as a "strong folk rocker that can't miss soaring to the top of the Hot 100." Cash Box said that the song was "solid Chicago blues with a punch all its own" and has a "rock pace that builds through the vocal thrusts of lead Jim Morrison, and excellent instrumental sections."

== Certifications ==
Region	Certification	Certified units/sales
United States (RIAA)	Gold	500,000^{‡}
^{‡} Sales+streaming figures based on certification alone.

== Personnel ==
Personnel are taken from The Doors – Sounds for Your Soul – Die Musik Der Doors book:

The Doors

- Jim Morrison – vocals
- Ray Manzarek – harpsichord
- Robby Krieger – guitar
- John Densmore – drums

Additional musicians

- Doug Lubahn – bass

== Aerosmith version ==
"Love Me Two Times" was recorded by Aerosmith for the soundtrack of the 1990 film Air America (whose producers, Carolco Pictures, would also produce a biopic about the Doors). The band also performed it at its 1990 MTV Unplugged performance, where lead singer Steven Tyler dedicated the song to Jim Morrison, who performed with the Doors at the same venue of the Unplugged performance, the Ed Sullivan Theater, several years prior. The 1990 cover reached number 27 on the U.S. Mainstream Rock Tracks chart. In 2001, the song was included on their greatest hits album, Young Lust: The Aerosmith Anthology. In addition, a remixed version was included on the Doors tribute album Stoned Immaculate, with added slide guitar by Robby Krieger and keyboards by Ray Manzarek.
