= People Are Strange =

1967 single by the Doors

- US single picture sleeve

Single by the Doors

from the album Strange Days
- B-side: "Unhappy Girl"
- Released: September 4, 1967
- Recorded: April 1967
- Genre: Psychedelic rock; Alternative Rock
- Length: 2:12
- Label: Elektra
- Songwriters: Jim Morrison; Robby Krieger
- Producer: Paul A. Rothchild

The Doors singles chronology
"Light My Fire" (1967)	"People Are Strange" (1967)	"Love Me Two Times" (1967)

"People Are Strange" is a song by the American rock band the Doors. It appears on the band's second studio album, Strange Days, released in September 1967. The song was written by the Doors' vocalist Jim Morrison and guitarist Robby Krieger, although all of the band are credited on the sleeve notes.

The track was first released with "Unhappy Girl" as the B-side. It peaked at number 12 on the Billboard Hot 100 chart.

== Writing ==
The song's composition started in early 1967. According to Doors drummer John Densmore, he and guitarist Robby Krieger, who had then been roommates, were visited by Jim Morrison who appeared to be "deeply depressed". At Krieger's suggestion, they took a walk along Laurel Canyon in the Hollywood Hills area of Los Angeles. Morrison returned from the walk "euphoric" with the early lyrics of "People Are Strange". Intrigued by the lyrics, Krieger was convinced that the song was a hit upon hearing the vocal melody:

[Morrison said] "Yeah, I feel really good about this one. It just came to me all of a sudden ... in a flash – as I was sitting up there on the ridge looking out over the city." His eyes were wild with excitement. "I scribbled it down as fast as I could. It felt great to be writing again." He looked down at the crumpled paper in his hand and sang the chorus in his haunting blues voice.

— John Densmore

== Overview ==
In a review for AllMusic, critic Tom Maginnis wrote the song "reflects the group's fascination with the theatrical music of European cabaret." The song is about alienation and being an outsider, and Morrison may have addressed the song both to the hippie culture, to outsiders in general or to users of drugs such as LSD, or both. Similarly, author Melissa Ursula Dawn Goldsmith felt that "People Are Strange" uses the "Expressionist idea of alienation and distanciation", and that the lyrics purposely express something positive as strange. Densmore believes that the song was the manifestation of Morrison's "vulnerability".

Billboard described the single as an "easy rocker with compelling lyric." Cash Box called it a "smashing performance", saying that the "mid-speed setting ... adds kick to the black humor of the lyrical content" and that the "production and work are fantastic".

The song influenced paintings by artist George Condo in 2023.

== Personnel ==
Per source:

The Doors

- Jim Morrison – lead and backing vocals
- Ray Manzarek – Vox Continental organ, tack piano
- Robby Krieger – slide guitar
- John Densmore – drums

Additional musician

- Doug Lubahn – bass guitar

== Charts ==
Chart (1967)	Peak position
Canada Top Singles (RPM)	1
New Zealand (Listener)	9
US Billboard Hot 100	12
US Cash Box Top 100	10

== Certifications ==
Region	Certification	Certified units/sales
Italy (FIMI)	Gold	50,000^{‡}
New Zealand (RMNZ)	Platinum	30,000^{‡}
Spain (Promusicae)	Gold	30,000^{‡}
United Kingdom (BPI)	Gold	400,000^{‡}
United States (RIAA)	Platinum	1,000,000^{‡}
^{‡} Sales+streaming figures based on certification alone.

== Echo & the Bunnymen cover ==
"People Are Strange"

Single by Echo & the Bunnymen

from the album The Lost Boys: Original Motion Picture Soundtrack
- B-side: "Run, Run, Run"
- Released: 8 February 1988
- Length: 3:36
- Label: WEA, EastWest
- Songwriter: The Doors
- Producer: Ray Manzarek

Echo & the Bunnymen singles chronology
"Bedbugs and Ballyhoo" (1987)	"People Are Strange" (1988)	"'The Peel Sessions'" (1988)

British group Echo & the Bunnymen recorded a cover version of "People Are Strange" for the soundtrack of the 1987 film The Lost Boys. It was subsequently released as a single in 1988, reaching number 29 on the UK Singles Chart in February 1988 and number 13 on the Irish Singles Chart in 1991.

The song was produced by Doors' keyboardist, Ray Manzarek. A 12-inch version was released in February 1988 before the single was re-released in 1991. The B-sides were all the same as their previous release, "Bedbugs and Ballyhoo".

=== Charts ===
Chart (1988)	Peak position
Ireland (Irish Singles Chart)	21
UK Singles (OCC)	29

Chart (1991)	Peak position
Ireland (Irish Singles Chart)	13
UK Singles (OCC)	34
UK Airplay (Music Week)	36

== Stina Nordenstam cover ==
"People Are Strange"

Single by Stina Nordenstam

from the album People Are Strange
- Released: 1998
- Genre: Alternative rock
- Length: 5:39
- Label: EastWest
- Songwriter: The Doors
- Producers: Ian Caple, Stina Nordenstam

Stina Nordenstam singles chronology
"Dynamite" (1997)	"People Are Strange" (1998)	"'Get on with Your Life'" (2004)

Swedish singer-songwriter Stina Nordenstam covered "People Are Strange" on her 1998 cover album of the same name. A remix single was released in conjunction with the album. The UNKLE remix appears as a bonus track on the Japanese version of the album, and can also be found on UNKLE's box set, Eden.
