= Five to One =

Song by the Doors

Song by the Doors

from the album Waiting for the Sun
- Released: July 3, 1968
- Recorded: February–May 1968
- Genre: Proto-metal, R&B
- Length: 4:24
- Label: Elektra
- Songwriter: The Doors
- Producer: Paul A. Rothchild

"Five to One" is a song by American rock band the Doors, from their 1968 album Waiting for the Sun. The song's lyrics were written by lead singer Jim Morrison but officially credited to the whole band. It was described as "revolutionary sloganeering".

== Composition ==
"One of the predecessors to heavy metal."

— Guitarist Robby Krieger

Unlike some of the Doors tracks, "Five to One" was created in the studio. According to music journalist Gillian G. Gaar, the song originated during a session when Morrison asked drummer John Densmore to lay down a 4/4 beat to which he inserted the lyrics. The song is consistently applied at 4/4 time signature, accompanied by a distorted sound of drums and bass.

The tune features a rhythm and blues vibe, and has been considered as an origin of the heavy metal genre. Critic Matthew Greenwald of AllMusic described Robby Krieger's guitar playing as "a menacing, proto-heavy metal", and on "top of that, John Densmore's relentless, almost march-rhythm drums take the song through various sections with a convincing power."

=== Lyrics ===
Morrison asserted that the song's lyrics are not political. Part of the song ("Your ballroom days are over, baby/ Night is drawing near/ Shadows of the evening/ crawl across the years"), was seemingly lifted from the 19th-century hymnal and bedtime rhyme "Now the Day Is Over" ("Now the day is over/ Night is drawing nigh/ Shadows of the evening/ Steal across the sky") by Morrison. Similarly, Morrison quoted the "Christian child's prayer" in a live version of "Soul Kitchen" sung in 1969, and also seemingly altered the children's rhyme "Jack be nimble, Jack be quick, Jack jump over the candlestick" to suit part of his poem "Curses, Invocations" in An American Prayer ("Words dissemble/ Words be quick/ Words resemble walking sticks").

== Public performances ==
The song's most famous performance was at the 1969 Miami concert at the Dinner Key Auditorium. Towards the end of the performance, a drunken Morrison declared the audience "idiots" and "slaves". The concert would end with Morrison being accused of "attempting to incite a riot" among the concert goers, resulting in his arrest, and later conviction, for indecent exposure.

During the post-Morrison appearance of the Doors on VH1 Storytellers in 2000, Scott Weiland of Stone Temple Pilots accepted the role of lead vocalist. Densmore said Weiland was one of the few frontmen who could "fill Jim's leather pants". Weiland said that "Five to One" inspired him to begin his career in rock music. In 2012, Ray Manzarek and Krieger recorded a live version of "Five to One" in the Sunset Strip Music Festival with Marilyn Manson on vocals.

== Legacy ==
The guitar solo on Pearl Jam's "Alive" was based on Ace Frehley's guitar solo on the Kiss song "She", which was in turn based on Robby Krieger's solo in "Five to One". In 2001, producer Kanye West sampled the song to form the beat of Jay-Z's diss song of Nas and Mobb Deep called "Takeover", also used in the Lordz of Brooklyn song "White Trash". According to Rob Hughes of Classic Rock, the song's intro "pre-figures the sick throb of Talking Heads' 'Psycho Killer'". Some have also suggested that Oasis' song "Waiting for the Rapture" borrows from "Five to One". The lyric featured in the track, "No one here gets out alive", was used as the title for the 1980 Morrison biography No One Here Gets Out Alive. Stereogum declared "Five to One" the "best song the band ever recorded", while the British daily newspaper, The Guardian, ranked it fifth on their 2015 respective list.

== Personnel ==
Details are taken from the 2019 Rhino Records reissue liner notes.

The Doors

- Jim Morrison – vocals
- Ray Manzarek – keyboards
- Robby Krieger – guitar
- John Densmore – drums

Additional musicians

- Douglas Lubahn - electric bass

Technical

- Paul A. Rothchild – production
- Bruce Botnick – engineering
