= Soul Kitchen (song) =

1967 song by the Doors

Song by the Doors

from the album The Doors
- Released: January 4, 1967
- Recorded: September 13, 1966
- Genre: Blues rock; hard rock
- Length: 3:30
- Label: Elektra
- Songwriter: The Doors
- Producer: Paul A. Rothchild

"Soul Kitchen" is a song by the Doors from their first album The Doors. Singer Jim Morrison wrote the lyrics as a tribute to the soul food restaurant Olivia's in Venice Beach, California. Because he often stayed too late, the staff had to kick him out, thus the lines "let me sleep all night, in your soul kitchen".

== Background ==
The song was inspired by Kim Fowley's 1965 single "The Trip". The track was recorded during an afternoon session on September 13, 1966 at Sunset Sound Recorders.

== Composition ==
The song is notated in the key of A Major with Jim Morrison's vocal range spanning from E_{4} to A_{5}. It has a Dorian alternation of i and IV.

The song's lyrics were written by Morrison during the summer of 1965, and the song was credited to all members of the band. Guitarist Robby Krieger acknowledged soul-singer James Brown's influence on the song, stating that he wanted to simulate a horn section by Brown, with the riff heard throughout. Music journalist Stephen Davis characterized it as a hard rock track, while Gillian G. Gaar called it "funky blues-rock".

== Critical reception ==
Sal Cinquemani of Slant Magazine declared "Soul Kitchen" as a "classic Doors song". According to rock critic Greil Marcus, "Soul Kitchen" is the Doors' version of "Gloria" by Van Morrison, a song the Doors often covered in their early days. Marcus writes, "It was a staircase—not, as with 'Gloria' in imagery, but in the cadence the two songs shared, slowed down so strongly in 'Soul Kitchen' that a sense of deliberation, so physical that it was more body than thought, became the guiding spirit of the song."

In a 1967 article in Crawdaddy! magazine, Paul Williams compared it to "Blowin' in the Wind" since both songs had a message, with the message of "Soul Kitchen" being "Learn to forget." He praised the song: "The End" is "great to listen to when you're high (or any other time)", but "Soul Kitchen" "will get you high, which is obviously much cruder and more important." David Fricke noted that with the "crisp funk" of "Soul Kitchen", the Doors "perfected an airtight resolution of their live prowess".

AllMusic critic Richie Unterberger praised the song's "stomping rock". On June 24, 2021, The Guardian published a list with "The Doors greatest songs", in which "Soul Kitchen" was placed as the sixth.

== Personnel ==
There has been some discrepancy at who contributed the bass: Doors' engineer Bruce Botnick recalled that after the song's recording, session musician Larry Knechtel was brought in to overdub bass; but guitarist Robby Krieger insists that he played the bass guitar.

=== The Doors ===
- Jim Morrison – lead and backing vocals
- Ray Manzarek – Vox Continental, keyboard bass
- Robby Krieger – guitar, bass guitar
- John Densmore – drums

=== Additional musicians ===
- Larry Knechtel – bass guitar

== X version ==
A cover of "Soul Kitchen" was included on the debut album by X, Los Angeles (1980). The album was produced by Doors organist Ray Manzarek, whose attention had been caught earlier by seeing X play a live cover of "Soul Kitchen" at the Whisky a Go Go. Manzarek later wrote about that initial experience "It was Soul Kitchen ... at a thousand miles an hour. I was completely hooked. It was like you were standing behind a 747 with the engines on full blast."
