= When the Music's Over =

Song by the Doors

Song by the Doors

from the album Strange Days
- Released: September 25, 1967
- Recorded: 1967
- Studio: Sunset Sound Recorders, Hollywood, California
- Genre: Art rock; proto-prog; experimental rock
- Length: 11:00
- Label: Elektra
- Songwriter: The Doors
- Producer: Paul A. Rothchild

Live video
- "The Doors - When The Music’s Over (Live At The Bowl ‘68)" on YouTube

"When the Music's Over" is an epic song by the American rock band the Doors, which appears on their second album, Strange Days, released in 1967. It is among the band's longer pieces, lasting 11 minutes.

== Origin ==
Like several other tracks from their second album, Strange Days, the song was composed before the group had a record contract, being performed and elaborated in the middle of 1966 at the Whisky a Go Go in Los Angeles. One performance from 1968 was released in 1987 on LP and video titled Live at the Hollywood Bowl, and re-released in 2012. A performance from 1970 was released in 2018 on the Live at the Isle of Wight Festival 1970 album. Rolling Stone magazine quoted Doors member John Densmore as saying, "playing that song was intense. I had to take a deep breath before playing it, because it's not a little three-minute pop ditty."

The final album version was recorded in 1967. Jim Morrison wanted the song to be recorded live in the studio without overdubs. However, after being absent from the original studio session for the better part of 24 hours, he found that the band refused to re-record the song, and he was required to record over the original vocals by Ray Manzarek. Morrison recorded his vocals in one single take.

Guitarist Robby Krieger later explained the difficulty of his guitar solo: "That solo was really a challenge because the harmony is static. I had to play 56 bars over the same riff." Manzarek has stated that he was inspired by Herbie Hancock's "Watermelon Man" while composing the organ intro.

== Structure and lyrics ==
The song can be divided into five parts, in which the fifth returns to the lyrics and theme of the first.

1. "Turn Out the Lights/Dance on Fire"
2. "Cancel My Subscription"
3. "What Have They Done to the Earth?"
4. "Persian Night"
5. "Return to the Main Themes"

According to music journalist Stephen Davis, the lyrics "When the music's over, turn out the lights" originated from a comment made by the owner of the London Fog, a Los Angeles music venue where the Doors played late at night. Davis also points out that the passage starting with the line "what have they done to the Earth?" is an early example of environmental themes in rock music.

== Personnel ==
- Jim Morrison – vocals
- Ray Manzarek – keyboards
- Robby Krieger – guitar
- John Densmore – drums
