= Peace Frog =

- Cover to French single release

Song by the Doors

from the album Morrison Hotel
- A-side: "You Make Me Real"
- Released: February 1970
- Recorded: November 1969
- Studio: Elektra, Los Angeles, California
- Genre: Blues rock; funk rock
- Length: 2:50
- Label: Elektra
- Songwriters: Jim Morrison; Robby Krieger
- Producer: Paul A. Rothchild

"Peace Frog" is a song by the Doors, which was released on their fifth studio album Morrison Hotel in 1970. Guitarist Robby Krieger explained that the music was written and recorded first, with the lyrics later coming from poems by singer Jim Morrison. Although the song was never released as a single in the United States, it was issued as the B-side of "You Make Me Real" in France.

"Peace Frog" was included on the Doors' second compilation album, Weird Scenes Inside the Gold Mine, released in 1972.

== Lyrics ==
The song's lyrics were derived from three poems written earlier by Morrison, titled "Abortion Stories", "Dawn's Highway" and "Newborn Awakening". The group, however, recorded the music of "Peace Frog" first, then Morrison overdubbed his vocals, as Krieger recalled: "I had written the music, we rehearsed it up, and it was really happening, but we didn't have any lyrics and Jim wasn't around. We just said, 'Fuck it, let's record it. He'll come up with something.' And he did. He took out his poetry book and found a poem that fit." The Doors performed the instrumental version at live shows during 1969. The title was originally "Abortion Stories", but at record producer Paul A. Rothchild's request, Morrison changed it to "Peace Frog", as he was afraid that the initial title would create some controversy.

"Peace Frog" features lyrics inspired by true events surrounding the band's frontman Morrison. The line "Blood in the streets in the town of New Haven" is a reference to his onstage arrest on December 9, 1967, during a live performance in New Haven Arena. After the guitar solo, the song enters a spoken word verse with the lines "Indians scattered on dawn's highway bleeding", which describes a highway accident that occurred when he was young. Morrison purportedly witnessed dead Native Americans while his family was crossing a desert by road in Albuquerque, New Mexico. He said, "That was the first time I tasted fear. I musta' been about four." Morrison was also referring to the 1968 Democratic National Convention protests with the lyric "Blood in the street/ The town of Chicago".

== Critical reception ==
Unlike the Doors's previous album, The Soft Parade, Morrison Hotel received positive responses by critics, and it was widely seen as a comeback in the band's quality. "Peace Frog" is also praised as one of the album's highlights. Louder Sound ranked the song among "The Top 20 Greatest Doors Songs", while Ultimate Classic Rock cited it as Robby Krieger's third best track for the group. Krieger himself, included it as one of his personal favorite Doors songs on The Doors: Box Set.

In a positive album review of Morrison Hotel, critic Thom Jerek of AllMusic described "Peace Frog" as "downright funky boogie". Sal Cinquemani writing for Slant Magazine, declared the song as the best track on Morrison Hotel, and "one of the Doors' greatest." Critic Jason Elias wrote that the song is "one of those tracks that will constantly amaze." He praised Robby Krieger's "bluesy lines" and Ray Manzarek's "eerie keyboards add to the chaos as usual." Hartford Courant critic J. Greg Robertson regarded the music and lyric to be "magnificent."

== Certifications ==
| Region | Certification | Certified units/sales |
|---|---|---|
| United States (RIAA) | Gold | 500,000^{‡} |
^{‡} Sales+streaming figures based on certification alone.

== Personnel ==
The Doors

- Jim Morrison – vocals
- Ray Manzarek – Vox Continental organ
- Robby Krieger – electric guitar with wah-wah pedal
- John Densmore – drums

Session musicians

- Ray Neapolitan – bass guitar
