= Back Door Man =

Song written by Willie Dixon and recorded by Howlin' Wolf

Single by Howlin' Wolf

from the album Howlin' Wolf
- A-side: "Wang Dang Doodle"
- Released: 1961
- Recorded: 1960
- Studio: Chess (Chicago)
- Genre: Blues
- Length: 2:47
- Label: Chess
- Songwriter: Willie Dixon
- Producers: Leonard Chess, Phil Chess, Willie Dixon

Howlin' Wolf singles chronology
"Spoonful" (1960)	"Back Door Man" (1961)	"Down in the Bottom" (1961)

"Back Door Man" is a blues song written by American musician Willie Dixon and recorded by Howlin' Wolf in 1960. The lyrics draw on a Southern U.S. cultural term for an extramarital affair. The song is one of several Dixon-Wolf songs that became popular among rock musicians, including the Doors who recorded it for their 1967 self-titled debut album.

== Lyrics ==
In Southern culture, the phrase "back-door man" refers to a man having an affair with a married woman, using the back door as an exit before the husband comes home. Dixon's lyrics include:

When everybody trying to sleep
I'm somewhere making my midnight creep
Every morning the rooster crow
He's telling me you got to go ...
I am the back door man

The philandering "back-door man" is a theme of several blues songs, including those by Charley Patton, Lightnin' Hopkins, Blind Willie McTell and Sara Martin: "every sensible woman got a back-door man", Martin sang in "Strange Loving Blues" (1925).

== Recording and releases ==
"Back Door Man" was recorded in Chicago in June 1960. Accompanying Howlin' Wolf on vocals are Otis Spann on piano, Hubert Sumlin on guitar, Willie Dixon on double bass, and Fred Below on drums. Both Freddie King and Freddy Robinson have been suggested as the second guitarist. The song features a modal arrangement, where it "hangs on one chord, hinging on an infectious and insistent riff [which] is similar to his own one-chord songs like 'I Asked for Water (She Gave Me Gasoline)' and 'Spoonful'", according to AllMusic reviewer Bill Janovitz.

Chess Records issued the song as the B-side to "Wang Dang Doodle" and included it on his second compilation album Howlin' Wolf (1962). Wolf later re-recorded the song for Chess' 1969 attempt to reach the rock audience, The Howlin' Wolf Album.

== The Doors version ==
"Back Door Man"

Song by the Doors

from the album The Doors
- Released: January 4, 1967
- Recorded: September 22, 1966
- Genre: Blues rock; hard rock; psychedelic blues
- Length: 3:32
- Label: Elektra
- Songwriter: Willie Dixon
- Producer: Paul A. Rothchild

The Doors recorded "Back Door Man" for their 1967 self-titled debut album. Doors' guitarist Robby Krieger introduced the other members of the group to a blues rock adaptation of the song recorded by John Hammond Jr. for his 1964 album Big City Blues. The Doors' version also incorporates elements of psychedelic blues and hard rock. Drummer John Densmore described it as a song that is "deeply sexual and got everyone moving."

Unlike Howlin' Wolf's one-chord arrangement, the Doors utilize a different approach. Critic Bill Janovitz described it as a "thumping rhythmic approach. They vary the chords in a 12-bar blues arrangement, which serves as a great tension-and-release pattern". Jim Morrison also supplied some of his own lyrics and only used two of Dixon's verses from Howlin' Wolf's original.

Morrison provides the vocal, backed by Ray Manzarek on keyboards and piano, Krieger on guitar, and Densmore on drums. Krieger asserts that he played bass guitar for the recording. The track was recorded during an afternoon recording session on September 22, 1966 at Sunset Sound Recorders. A live recording of the song appears as a part of a medley, on the Doors' live album Absolutely Live (1970).

=== Personnel ===
- Jim Morrison – vocals
- Ray Manzarek – Vox Continental, piano
- Robby Krieger – lead and rhythm guitar, bass
- John Densmore – drums

== Sources ==
- Davis, Stephen (2004). Jim Morrison: Life, Death, Legend. Gotham Books. ISBN 1-59240-064-7.
- Dixon, Willie; Snowden, Don (1989). I Am the Blues. Boston, Massachusetts: Da Capo Press. ISBN 0-306-80415-8.
- Densmore, John (1991). Riders on the Storm: My Life with Jim Morrison and the Doors. Dell Publishing. ISBN 0-385-30447-1.
- Gerstenmeyer, Heinz (2001). The Doors – Sounds for Your Soul – Die Musik Der Doors (in German). BoD – Books on Demand. ISBN 978-3-8311-2057-4.
- Oliver, Paul (1990). Blues Fell This Morning: Meaning in the Blues. Cambridge, UK: Cambridge University Press. ISBN 0-521-37793-5.
- Segrest, James; Hoffman, Mark (2004). Moanin' at Midnight: The Life and Times of Howlin' Wolf. New York City: Pantheon Books. ISBN 0-375-42246-3.
- Shurman, Dick (1991). Howlin' Wolf: The Chess Box (Box set booklet). Howlin' Wolf. Chess/MCA Records. CHD3-9332.
- Krieger, Robby (2021). Set the Night on Fire: Living, Dying, and Playing Guitar with the Doors. Hachette Books. ISBN 978-0316243544.
- Matijas-Mecca, Christian (2020). Listen to Psychedelic Rock! Exploring a Musical Genre. Hardcover. ISBN 978-1440861970.
