= List of songs recorded by the Doors =

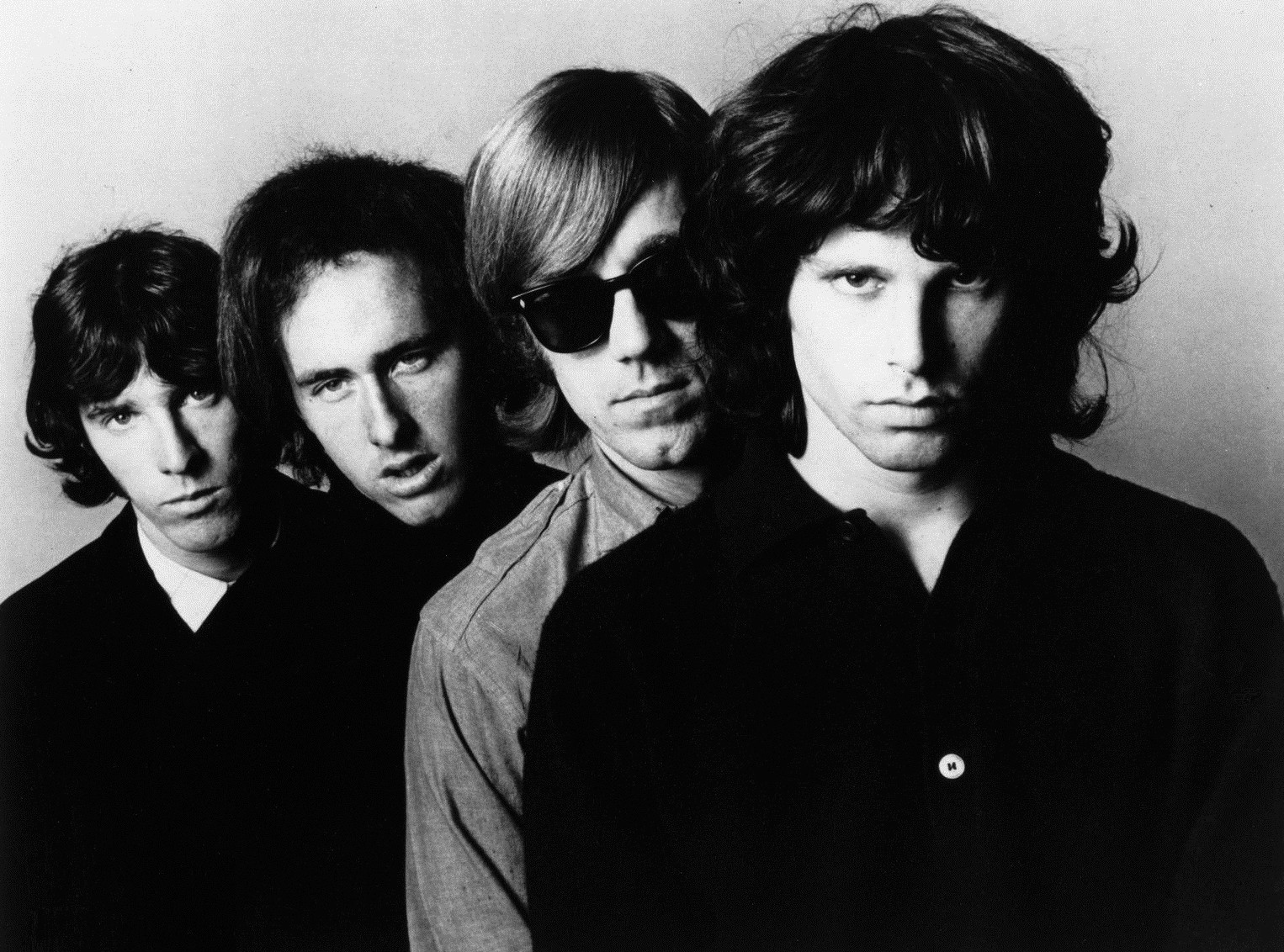
The Doors in 1966

This list contains virtually every officially released track by the Doors, including cover versions, outtakes, B-sides, and non-album singles. This list excludes live performances and alternate mixes.

== List ==
Key
†	Indicates A-sided single release
#	Indicates songs that were not written or co-written by a member of the Doors
‡	Indicates reissues, compilations, and box sets

Name of song, songwriter(s), years of recording and release, and album debut
Song	Songwriter(s)	Recorded	Album	Year	Ref(s).
"4 Billion Souls"	Robby Krieger	1972	Full Circle	1972	
"Alabama Song (Whisky Bar)"	Bertolt Brecht; Kurt Weill #	1966	The Doors	1967	
"American Night"	Jim Morrison (lyrics)	1969–1970; 1978	An American Prayer	1978	
"Angels and Sailors"	Jim Morrison (lyrics)	1969–1970; 1978	An American Prayer	1978	
"Awake"	Jim Morrison (lyrics)	1969–1970; 1978	An American Prayer	1978	
"Back Door Man"	Willie Dixon #	1966	The Doors	1967	
"Been Down So Long"	Jim Morrison; Ray Manzarek; Robby Krieger; John Densmore	1970–1971	L.A. Woman	1971	
"Black Polished Chrome"	Jim Morrison (lyrics)	1969–1970; 1978	An American Prayer	1978	
"Blue Sunday"	Jim Morrison	1969	Morrison Hotel	1970	
"Breakn' a Sweat"	Jim Morrison; Ray Manzarek; Robby Krieger; John Densmore; Skrillex	2011	Bangarang	2011	
"Break On Through (To the Other Side)" †	Jim Morrison; Ray Manzarek; Robby Krieger; John Densmore	1966	The Doors	1967	
"Carol"	Chuck Berry #	1969	Perception ‡	2006	
"Cars Hiss by My Window"	Jim Morrison; Ray Manzarek; Robby Krieger; John Densmore	1970–1971	L.A. Woman	1971	
"Celebration of the Lizard"	Jim Morrison (lyrics)	1968; 2003	Legacy: The Absolute Best ‡	2003	
"The Changeling"	Jim Morrison; Ray Manzarek; Robby Krieger; John Densmore	1970	L.A. Woman	1971	
"Crawling King Snake"	John Lee Hooker #	1970–1971	L.A. Woman	1971	
"Curses, Invocations"	Jim Morrison (lyrics)	1969–1970; 1978	An American Prayer	1978	
"The Crystal Ship"	Jim Morrison; Ray Manzarek; Robby Krieger; John Densmore	1966	The Doors	1967	
"Dawn's Highway"	Jim Morrison (lyrics)	1969–1970; 1978	An American Prayer	1978	
"Do It"	Jim Morrison; Robby Krieger	1968	The Soft Parade	1969	
"Down on the Farm"	Robby Krieger	1971	Other Voices	1971	
"Easy Ride"	Jim Morrison	1968	The Soft Parade	1969	
"End of the Night"	Jim Morrison; Ray Manzarek; Robby Krieger; John Densmore	1966	The Doors	1967	
"The End"	Jim Morrison; Ray Manzarek; Robby Krieger; John Densmore	1966	The Doors	1967	
"A Feast of Friends"	Jim Morrison (lyrics)	1969–1970; 1978	An American Prayer	1978	
"Five to One"	Jim Morrison; Ray Manzarek; Robby Krieger; John Densmore	1968	Waiting for the Sun	1968	
"Freedom Exists"	Jim Morrison (lyrics)	1969–1970; 1978	An American Prayer	1978	
"Get Up and Dance" †	Ray Manzarek; Robby Krieger	1972	Full Circle	1972	
"Ghost Song"	Jim Morrison (lyrics)	1969–1970; 1978	An American Prayer	1978	
"Go Insane"	Jim Morrison; Ray Manzarek; Robby Krieger; John Densmore	1965	The Doors: Box Set ‡	1997	
"Good Rockin'"	Roy Brown #	1972	Full Circle	1972	
"Hang On to Your Life"	Ray Manzarek; Robby Krieger	1971	Other Voices	1971	
"Hardwood Floor"	Robby Krieger	1972	Full Circle	1972	
"Hello, I Love You" †	Jim Morrison; Ray Manzarek; Robby Krieger; John Densmore	1968	Waiting for the Sun	1968	
"The Hitchhiker"	Jim Morrison (lyrics)	1969–1970; 1978	An American Prayer	1978	
"Horse Latitudes"	Jim Morrison; Ray Manzarek; Robby Krieger; John Densmore	1967	Strange Days	1967	
"Hour for Magic"	Jim Morrison (lyrics)	1969–1970; 1978	An American Prayer	1978	
"Hyacinth House"	Jim Morrison; Ray Manzarek; Robby Krieger; John Densmore	1970–1971	L.A. Woman	1971	
"I Can't See Your Face in My Mind"	Jim Morrison; Ray Manzarek; Robby Krieger; John Densmore	1967	Strange Days	1967	
"I Looked At You"	Jim Morrison; Ray Manzarek; Robby Krieger; John Densmore	1966	The Doors	1967	
"I Will Never Be Untrue"	Jim Morrison; Ray Manzarek; Robby Krieger; John Densmore	1969	Morrison Hotel (50th Anniversary Deluxe Edition) ‡	2020	
"I'm Horny, I'm Stoned"	Robby Krieger	1971	Other Voices	1971	
"I'm Your Doctor"	James Oden #	1969	The Soft Parade (50th Anniversary Edition) ‡	2019	
"Indian Summer"	Jim Morrison; Robby Krieger	1966	Morrison Hotel	1970	
"In the Eye of the Sun"	Ray Manzarek	1971	Other Voices	1971	
"It Slipped My Mind"	Robby Krieger	1972	Full Circle	1972	
"L'America"	Jim Morrison; Ray Manzarek; Robby Krieger; John Densmore	1970–1971	L.A. Woman	1971	
"Land Ho!"	Jim Morrison; Robby Krieger	1969	Morrison Hotel	1970	
"L.A. Woman"	Jim Morrison; Ray Manzarek; Robby Krieger; John Densmore	1970–1971	L.A. Woman	1971	
"Lament"	Jim Morrison (lyrics)	1969–1970; 1978	An American Prayer	1978	
"Latino Chrome"	Jim Morrison (lyrics)	1969–1970; 1978	An American Prayer	1978	
"Light My Fire" †	Jim Morrison; Ray Manzarek; Robby Krieger; John Densmore	1966	The Doors	1967	
"Love Her Madly" †	Jim Morrison; Ray Manzarek; Robby Krieger; John Densmore	1970–1971	L.A. Woman	1971	
"Love Me Two Times" †	Jim Morrison; Ray Manzarek; Robby Krieger; John Densmore	1967	Strange Days	1967	
"Love Street"	Jim Morrison; Ray Manzarek; Robby Krieger; John Densmore	1968	Waiting for the Sun	1968	
"Maggie M'Gill"	Jim Morrison (lyrics)	1969	Morrison Hotel	1970	
"Money Beats Soul"	Jim Morrison	1970	Perception ‡	2006	
"Money (That's What I Want)"	Janie Bradford; Berry Gordy #	1969	Morrison Hotel (50th Anniversary Deluxe Edition) ‡	2020	
"Moonlight Drive"	Jim Morrison; Ray Manzarek; Robby Krieger; John Densmore	1967	Strange Days	1967	
"The Mosquito" †	Ray Manzarek; Robby Krieger; John Densmore	1972	Full Circle	1972	
"The Movie"	Jim Morrison (lyrics)	1969–1970; 1978	An American Prayer	1978	
"My Eyes Have Seen You"	Jim Morrison; Ray Manzarek; Robby Krieger; John Densmore	1967	Strange Days	1967	
"My Wild Love"	Jim Morrison; Ray Manzarek; Robby Krieger; John Densmore	1968	Waiting for the Sun	1968	
"Newborn Awakening"	Jim Morrison (lyrics)	1969–1970; 1978	An American Prayer	1978	
"Not to Touch the Earth"	Jim Morrison; Ray Manzarek; Robby Krieger; John Densmore	1968	Waiting for the Sun	1968	
"Orange County Suite"	Jim Morrison; Ray Manzarek; Robby Krieger; John Densmore	1969; 1997	The Doors: Box Set ‡	1997	
"Peace Frog"	Jim Morrison; Robby Krieger	1969	Morrison Hotel	1970	
"The Peking King and the New York Queen"	Ray Manzarek	1972	Full Circle	1972	
"People Are Strange" †	Jim Morrison; Ray Manzarek; Robby Krieger; John Densmore	1967	Strange Days	1967	
"The Piano Bird" †	John Densmore; Jack Conrad	1972	Full Circle	1972	
"The Poets Dream"	Jim Morrison (lyrics)	1969–1970; 1978	An American Prayer	1978	
"Push Push"	Jim Morrison; Ray Manzarek; Robby Krieger; John Densmore	1969	Perception ‡	2006	
"Queen of the Highway"	Jim Morrison; Robby Krieger	1969	Morrison Hotel	1970	
"Riders on the Storm" †	Jim Morrison; Ray Manzarek; Robby Krieger; John Densmore	1970–1971	L.A. Woman	1971	
"Roadhouse Blues"	Jim Morrison (lyrics)	1970	Morrison Hotel	1970	
"Rock Is Dead"	Jim Morrison; Ray Manzarek; Robby Krieger; John Densmore	1969	The Soft Parade (50th Anniversary Edition) ‡	2019	
"Rock Me"	Joe Josea; B. B. King #	1970–1971	L.A. Woman (40th Anniversary Edition) ‡	2012	
"Runnin' Blue" †	Robby Krieger	1968–1969	The Soft Parade	1969	
"Shaman's Blues"	Jim Morrison	1968	The Soft Parade	1969	
"She Smells So Nice"	Jim Morrison; Ray Manzarek; Robby Krieger; John Densmore	1970–1971	L.A. Woman (40th Anniversary Edition)	2012	
"Ship of Fools"	Jim Morrison; Robby Krieger	1969	Morrison Hotel	1970	
"Ships w/ Sails" †	Robby Krieger; John Densmore	1971	Other Voices	1971	
"The Soft Parade"	Jim Morrison	1969	The Soft Parade	1969	
"Soul Kitchen"	Jim Morrison; Ray Manzarek; Robby Krieger; John Densmore	1966	The Doors	1967	
"Spanish Caravan"	Jim Morrison; Ray Manzarek; Robby Krieger; John Densmore	1968	Waiting for the Sun	1968	
"The Spy"	Jim Morrison	1969	Morrison Hotel	1970	
"Stoned Immaculate"	Jim Morrison (lyrics)	1969–1970; 1978	An American Prayer	1978	
"Strange Days"	Jim Morrison; Ray Manzarek; Robby Krieger; John Densmore	1967	Strange Days	1967	
"Summer's Almost Gone"	Jim Morrison; Ray Manzarek; Robby Krieger; John Densmore	1968	Waiting for the Sun	1968	
"Take It as It Comes"	Jim Morrison; Ray Manzarek; Robby Krieger; John Densmore	1966	The Doors	1967	
"Tell All the People" †	Robby Krieger	1968	The Soft Parade	1969	
"Tightrope Ride" †	Ray Manzarek; Robby Krieger	1971	Other Voices	1971	
"To Come of Age"	Jim Morrison (lyrics)	1969–1970; 1978	An American Prayer	1978	
"Touch Me" †	Robby Krieger	1968	The Soft Parade	1969	
"Treetrunk"	Robby Krieger	1972	B-side to "Get Up and Dance"	1972	
"Twentieth Century Fox"	Jim Morrison; Ray Manzarek; Robby Krieger; John Densmore	1966	The Doors	1967	
"Unhappy Girl"	Jim Morrison; Ray Manzarek; Robby Krieger; John Densmore	1967	Strange Days	1967	
"The Unknown Soldier" †	Jim Morrison; Ray Manzarek; Robby Krieger; John Densmore	1967	Waiting for the Sun	1968	
"Variety Is the Spice of Life"	Robby Krieger	1971	Other Voices	1971	
"Verdilac"	Ray Manzarek; Robby Krieger	1972	Full Circle	1972	
"Waiting for the Sun"	Jim Morrison	1969	Morrison Hotel	1970	
"Wandering Musician"	Robby Krieger	1971	Other Voices	1971	
"The WASP (Texas Radio and the Big Beat)"	Jim Morrison; Ray Manzarek; Robby Krieger; John Densmore	1970–1971	L.A. Woman	1971	
"We Could Be So Good Together"	Jim Morrison; Ray Manzarek; Robby Krieger; John Densmore	1968	Waiting for the Sun	1968	
"When the Music's Over"	Jim Morrison; Ray Manzarek; Robby Krieger; John Densmore	1967	Strange Days	1967	
"Whiskey, Mystics and Men"	Jim Morrison; Ray Manzarek; Robby Krieger; John Densmore	1969	Essential Rarities ‡	1999	
"Who Scared You"	Jim Morrison; Robby Krieger	1968	B-side to "Wishful Sinful"	1969	
"Wild Child"	Jim Morrison	1968	The Soft Parade	1969	
"Wintertime Love"	Jim Morrison; Ray Manzarek; Robby Krieger; John Densmore	1968	Waiting for the Sun	1968	
"Wishful Sinful" †	Robby Krieger	1968	The Soft Parade	1969	
"Woman Is a Devil"	Robert Johnson #	1968	Essential Rarities ‡	1999	
"The World on Fire"	Jim Morrison (lyrics)	1969–1970; 1978	An American Prayer	1978	
"Yes, the River Knows"	Jim Morrison; Ray Manzarek; Robby Krieger; John Densmore	1968	Waiting for the Sun	1968	
"You Make Me Real" †	Jim Morrison	1969	Morrison Hotel	1970	
"(You Need Meat) Don't Go No Further"	Willie Dixon #	1970–1971	B-side to "Love Her Madly"	1971	
"You're Lost Little Girl"	Jim Morrison; Ray Manzarek; Robby Krieger; John Densmore	1967	Strange Days	1967	
