= The Doors: Vinyl Box Set =

Box set by the Doors
- Released: April 22, 2008
- Recorded: 1966–1971
- Genre: Rock
- Label: Elektra
- Producers: Paul A. Rothchild; Bruce Botnick; The Doors

The Doors chronology
Perception (2006)	The Doors: Vinyl Box Set (2008)	Live in New York (2009)

The Doors: Vinyl Box Set is the seventh box set for American rock band the Doors. It is a seven-record set of the original six studio albums, remastered in stereo from the original analogue tapes and pressed on 180-gram HQ vinyl, and a mono version of the debut album. Artwork, packaging (the outer box featured faux lizard skin), and inner sleeves are replicas of the original LPs issued between 1967 and 1971. The albums were remastered from 192k/24 bit digital copies and pressed at Record Technology (RTI). An insert booklet includes notes from Jac Holzman, founder of Elektra Records and Bruce Botnick the Doors' longtime sound engineer/co-producer on all the original studio albums.

Although originally planned for release in October 2007, the box set was finally released on April 22, 2008. The delay was due to an issue with the vinyl, as well as other problems in the production of the box set. Further delays included faulty test pressings, inferiority of the L.A. Woman artwork, and poor compounds in the initial vinyl run, which caused a search for a new source of virgin vinyl. The box set was released via Rhino Records and limited to 12,500 copies.

== Track listing ==
All songs written by Jim Morrison, Robby Krieger, Ray Manzarek, and John Densmore, except where noted.

=== Disc 1: The Doors ===
No.	Title	Length
1.	"Break On Through (To the Other Side)"	2:25
2.	"Soul Kitchen"	3:30
3.	"The Crystal Ship"	2:30
4.	"Twentieth Century Fox"	2:30
5.	"Alabama Song (Whisky Bar)" (writers: Bertolt Brecht, Kurt Weill)	3:15
6.	"Light My Fire"	6:50
7.	"Back Door Man" (writers: Willie Dixon, Chester Burnett a.k.a. Howlin' Wolf)	3:30
8.	"I Looked at You"	2:18
9.	"End of the Night"	2:49
10.	"Take It as It Comes"	2:13
11.	"The End"	11:35

=== Disc 2: Strange Days ===
No.	Title	Length
1.	"Strange Days"	3:05
2.	"You're Lost Little Girl"	3:01
3.	"Love Me Two Times"	3:23
4.	"Unhappy Girl"	2:00
5.	"Horse Latitudes"	1:30
6.	"Moonlight Drive"	3:00
7.	"People Are Strange"	2:10
8.	"My Eyes Have Seen You"	2:22
9.	"I Can't See Your Face in My Mind"	3:18
10.	"When the Music's Over"	11:00

=== Disc 3: Waiting for the Sun ===
No.	Title	Length
1.	"Hello, I Love You"	2:14
2.	"Love Street"	2:53
3.	"Not to Touch the Earth"	3:56
4.	"Summer's Almost Gone"	3:22
5.	"Wintertime Love"	1:54
6.	"The Unknown Soldier"	3:22
7.	"Spanish Caravan"	3:03
8.	"My Wild Love"	3:01
9.	"We Could Be So Good Together"	2:26
10.	"Yes, the River Knows"	2:36
11.	"Five to One"	4:26

=== Disc 4: The Soft Parade ===
No.	Title	Writer(s)	Length
1.	"Tell All the People"	Robby Krieger	3:21
2.	"Touch Me"	Krieger	3:12
3.	"Shaman's Blues"	Jim Morrison	4:49
4.	"Do It"	Morrison, Krieger	3:08
5.	"Easy Ride"	Morrison	2:43
6.	"Wild Child"	Morrison	2:36
7.	"Runnin' Blue"	Krieger	2:27
8.	"Wishful Sinful"	Krieger	2:58
9.	"The Soft Parade"	Morrison	8:36

=== Disc 5: Morrison Hotel ===
No.	Title	Writer(s)	Length
1.	"Roadhouse Blues"	Jim Morrison, music by the Doors	4:04
2.	"Waiting for the Sun"	Morrison	3:58
3.	"You Make Me Real"	Morrison	2:50
4.	"Peace Frog"	Morrison, Krieger	2:52
5.	"Blue Sunday"	Morrison	2:08
6.	"Ship of Fools"	Morrison, Krieger	3:06
7.	"Land Ho!"	Morrison, Krieger	4:08
8.	"The Spy"	Morrison	4:15
9.	"Queen of the Highway"	Morrison, Krieger	2:47
10.	"Indian Summer"	Morrison, Krieger	2:33
11.	"Maggie M'Gill"	Morrison, music by the Doors	4:24

=== Disc 6: L.A. Woman ===
No.	Title	Writer(s)	Length
1.	"The Changeling"		4:20
2.	"Love Her Madly"		3:18
3.	"Been Down So Long"		4:40
4.	"Cars Hiss by My Window"		4:10
5.	"L.A. Woman"		7:49
6.	"L'America"		4:35
7.	"Hyacinth House"		3:10
8.	"Crawling King Snake"	John Lee Hooker (Note: The 1971 Elektra Records LP did not indicate a songwriter; the 2017 Rhino Records edition listed John Lee Hooker. Hooker claimed that he got the song from bluesman Tony Hollins.)	4:57
9.	"The WASP (Texas Radio and the Big Beat)"		4:12
10.	"Riders on the Storm"		7:14

=== Disc 7 (mono): The Doors ===
1. "Break On Through (To the Other Side)" (Morrison) – 2:30
2. "Soul Kitchen" (Morrison) – 3:35
3. "The Crystal Ship" (Morrison) – 2:34
4. "Twentieth Century Fox" (Morrison) – 2:33
5. "Alabama Song (Whisky Bar)" (Brecht, Weill) – 3:20
6. "Light My Fire" (Krieger, Morrison) – 7:08
7. "Back Door Man" (Dixon, Burnett) – 3:34
8. "I Looked at You" (Morrison) – 2:22
9. "End of the Night" (Morrison) – 2:52
10. "Take It as It Comes" (Morrison) – 2:18
11. "The End" – 11:44

== Other sources ==
- "The Doors' 60th anniversary celebrated with 6-LP vinyl box set, live album, and anthology book". Consequence.net. October 8, 2024.
- "R.I.P. - Ray Manzarek of The Doors". Soundandvision.com. December 2, 2024. Archived from the original on December 2, 2024.
