= Perception (The Doors album) =

Box set by the Doors
- Released: November 21, 2006
- Recorded: 1966–1971
- Genre: Rock
- Length: 345:42
- Label: Elektra
- Producers: Bruce Botnick; The Doors

The Doors chronology
Love/Death/Travel (2006)	Perception (2006)	The Doors: Vinyl Box Set (2008)

Professional ratings
Review scores
Source	Rating
AllMusic	4.5/5 stars
Classic Rock	8/10 stars
Pitchfork Media	6.5/10

Perception is a 12-disc box set by American rock band the Doors. The CDs contain the six 1999 remastered versions of the Doors' six studio albums plus DVD-Audio discs containing the 2007 40th anniversary stereo and surround remixes of those albums as well as visual extras. Each album includes extra tracks consisting of previously unreleased session outtakes. Exclusive to the box set is a DVD with several live performances and other extras. The title is derived from Aldous Huxley's book The Doors of Perception, which inspired the band's name.

== Track listing ==
All songs written by Jim Morrison, Robby Krieger, Ray Manzarek, and John Densmore, except where noted.

=== Discs one and two: The Doors ===
1. "Break On Through (To the Other Side)" (Jim Morrison) - 2:29
2. "Soul Kitchen" (Morrison) - 3:35
3. "The Crystal Ship" (Morrison) - 2:34
4. "Twentieth Century Fox" (Morrison) - 2:33
5. "Alabama Song (Whisky Bar)" (Bertolt Brecht, Kurt Weill) - 3:20
6. "Light My Fire" (Robby Krieger, Morrison) - 7:06
7. "Back Door Man" (Willie Dixon, Chester Burnett) - 3:34
8. "I Looked at You" (Morrison) - 2:22
9. "End of the Night" (Morrison) - 2:52
10. "Take It As It Comes" (Morrison) - 2:17
11. "The End" - 11:41
12. "Moonlight Drive" ('66 Version 1) (Morrison) - 2:42
13. "Moonlight Drive" ('66 Version 2) (Morrison) - 2:31
14. "Indian Summer" (8/19/66 Vocal) (Morrison, Krieger) - 2:35

=== Discs three and four: Strange Days ===
1. "Strange Days" (Morrison) - 3:11
2. "You're Lost Little Girl" (Krieger) - 3:03
3. "Love Me Two Times" (Krieger) - 3:18
4. "Unhappy Girl" (Morrison) - 2:02
5. "Horse Latitudes" (Morrison) - 1:37
6. "Moonlight Drive" (Morrison) - 3:05
7. "People Are Strange" (Morrison, Krieger) - 2:13
8. "My Eyes Have Seen You" (Morrison) - 2:32
9. "I Can't See Your Face in My Mind" (Morrison) - 3:26
10. "When the Music's Over" - 10:58
11. "People Are Strange" (False Starts & Dialogue) (Morrison, Krieger) - 1:57
12. "Love Me Two Times" (Take 3) (Krieger) - 3:19

=== Discs five and six: Waiting for the Sun ===
1. "Hello, I Love You" (Morrison) - 2:14
2. "Love Street" (Morrison) - 2:53
3. "Not to Touch the Earth" (Morrison) - 3:56
4. "Summer's Almost Gone" (Morrison) - 3:22
5. "Wintertime Love" (Morrison) - 1:54
6. "The Unknown Soldier" - 3:25
7. "Spanish Caravan" - 3:03
8. "My Wild Love" (Morrison) -3:01
9. "We Could Be So Good Together" (Morrison) - 2:26
10. "Yes, the River Knows" (Krieger) - 2:36
11. "Five to One" (Morrison) - 4:26
12. "Albinoni's Adagio in G Minor" (Remo Giazotto) - 4:32
13. "Not to Touch the Earth" (Dialogue) (Morrison) - 0:38
14. "Not to Touch the Earth" (Take 1) (Morrison) - 4:05
15. "Not to Touch the Earth" (Take 2) (Morrison) - 4:18
16. "Celebration of the Lizard" (An Experiment/Work in Progress) (Morrison) - 17:09

=== Discs seven and eight: The Soft Parade ===
1. "Tell All the People" (Krieger) - 3:23
2. "Touch Me" (Krieger) - 3:12
3. "Shaman's Blues" (Morrison) - 4:49
4. "Do It" (Morrison, Krieger) - 3:08
5. "Easy Ride" (Morrison) - 2:41
6. "Wild Child" (Morrison) - 2:38
7. "Runnin' Blue" (Krieger) - 2:33
8. "Wishful Sinful" (Krieger) - 3:02
9. "The Soft Parade" (Morrison) - 9:41
10. "Who Scared You" (Morrison, Krieger) - 3:58
11. "Whiskey, Mystics & Men" (Version 1)(Morrison) - 2:28
12. "Whiskey, Mystics & Men" (Version 2) - 3:04
13. "Push Push" - 6:05
14. "Touch Me" (Dialogue) (Krieger) - 0:28
15. "Touch Me" (Take 3) (Krieger) - 3:40

=== Discs nine and ten: Morrison Hotel ===
1. "Roadhouse Blues" (Morrison) - 4:04
2. "Waiting for the Sun" (Morrison) - 3:59
3. "You Make Me Real" (Morrison) - 2:53
4. "Peace Frog" (Morrison, Krieger) - 5:04
5. "Blue Sunday" (Morrison) - 2:13
6. "Ship of Fools" (Morrison, Krieger) - 3:08
7. "Land Ho!" (Morrison, Krieger) - 4:10
8. "The Spy" (Morrison) - 4:17
9. "Queen of the Highway" (Morrison, Krieger) - 2:47
10. "Indian Summer" (Morrison, Krieger) - 2:36
11. "Maggie M'Gill" (Morrison) - 4:23
12. "Talking Blues" (Morrison) - 0:59
13. "Roadhouse Blues" (Takes 1–3, 11/4/69) (Morrison) - 8:47
14. "Roadhouse Blues" (Take 6, 11/4/69) (Morrison) - 9:26
15. "Carol" (Chuck Berry) - 0:56
16. "Roadhouse Blues" (Take 1, 11/5/69) (Morrison) - 4:32
17. "Money Beats Soul" (Morrison) - 1:04
18. "Roadhouse Blues" (Takes 13–15, 11/5/69) (Morrison) - 6:21
19. "Peace Frog" (False Starts & Dialogue) (Morrison, Krieger) - 2:00
20. "The Spy" (Version 2) (Morrison) - 3:48
21. "Queen of the Highway" (Jazz Version) (Morrison, Krieger) - 3:36

=== Discs eleven and twelve: L.A. Woman ===
1. "The Changeling" (Morrison) - 4:21
2. "Love Her Madly" (Krieger) - 3:20
3. "Been Down So Long" (Morrison) - 4:41
4. "Cars Hiss By My Window" (Morrison) - 4:58
5. "L.A. Woman" (Morrison) - 7:57
6. "L'America" (Morrison) - 4:37
7. "Hyacinth House" (Ray Manzarek, Morrison) - 3:11
8. "Crawling King Snake" (Anon, arr. by John Lee Hooker) - 5:00
9. "The WASP (Texas Radio and the Big Beat)" (Morrison) - 4:16
10. "Riders on the Storm" - 7:09
11. "Orange County Suite" (Morrison) - 5:45
12. "(You Need Meat) Don't Go No Further" (Dixon) - 3:41
- Discs two, four, six, eight, ten and twelve are DVDs that are exclusive to the box set.

== Personnel ==
- Jim Morrison – lead vocals
- Ray Manzarek – piano, organ, keyboards & bass
- John Densmore – drums
- Robby Krieger – guitar
- Paul A. Rothchild – producer of all albums except L.A. Woman
- Bruce Botnick – co-producer of L.A. Woman
- Larry Knechtel (uncredited) – bass guitar on tracks 2, 4, 6–8, & 10 of The Doors
- Douglass Lubahn – bass guitar on tracks 1–3, 6–9 (of Strange Days), 1–5, 7, 9–11 (of Waiting for the Sun), 5–6, & 8 (of The Soft Parade)
- Kerry Magness – bass guitar on track 6 of Waiting for the Sun
- Leroy Vinnegar – acoustic bass on track 7 of Waiting for the Sun
- Curtis Amy – saxophone solo on track 2 of The Soft Parade
- Reinol Andino – conga on track 9 of The Soft Parade
- George Bohanan – trombone on tracks 1, 2, 7, and 8 of The Soft Parade
- Harvey Brooks – bass guitar on tracks 1–4, 7 and 9 of The Soft Parade
- Jimmy Buchanan – fiddle on track 7 of The Soft Parade
- Jesse McReynolds – mandolin on track 2 of The Soft Parade
- Champ Webb – English horn solo on track 8 of The Soft Parade
- Paul Harris – orchestral arrangements on tracks 1, 2, 7, and 8 of The Soft Parade
- Lonnie Mack – bass guitar on tracks 1 and 11 of Morrison Hotel
- Ray Neapolitan – bass guitar on tracks 2–9 of Morrison Hotel
- John Sebastian (credited as "G. Puglese") – harmonica on track 1 of Morrison Hotel
- Jerry Scheff – bass guitar on L.A. Woman
- Marc Benno – additional guitar on tracks 3–5 & 8 from L.A Woman
