= The Singles (The Doors album) =

Compilation album by the Doors
- Released: September 15, 2017
- Recorded: 1966–1983
- Genre: Rock
- Length: 127:54 (vinyl); 139:33 (CD)
- Labels: Elektra; Rhino
- Producers: Paul A. Rothchild; Bruce Botnick; The Doors

The Doors chronology
A Collection (2011)	The Singles (2017)

The Singles is a compilation album/box set by the Doors, released on September 15, 2017. It contains both the A-sides and B-sides of all 20 US singles released between 1967 and 1983.

The collection was released in several formats: a vinyl box set containing 20 7-inch singles in packaging replicating the original singles; a double CD version containing four bonus mono radio tracks; and a three-disc deluxe edition containing the double CD version plus a bonus Blu-ray disc containing the quadraphonic mix of the 1973 album The Best of the Doors. All tracks were mastered from the original analog master tapes by the band's longtime engineer Bruce Botnick.

== Track listing ==
All songs written by the Doors (Jim Morrison, Ray Manzarek, Robby Krieger, John Densmore) unless otherwise stated. Details are taken from the 2017 Rhino release; other releases may show different information. All songs stereo except those indicated otherwise; track times are taken from gapless electronic playback, as none are stated on the album itself.

Disc one
No.	Title	Length
1.	"Break On Through (To the Other Side)" (mono single version)	2:29
2.	"End of the Night" (mono single version)	2:54
3.	"Light My Fire" (mono single edit)	2:56
4.	"The Crystal Ship" (mono single version)	2:35
5.	"People Are Strange" (mono single version)	2:12
6.	"Unhappy Girl" (mono single version)	1:58
7.	"Love Me Two Times" (mono single edit)	2:40
8.	"Moonlight Drive" (mono single version)	2:54
9.	"The Unknown Soldier" (mono single version)	3:23
10.	"We Could Be So Good Together" (mono single version)	2:25
11.	"Hello, I Love You" (single version)	2:17
12.	"Love Street" (single version)	2:53
13.	"Touch Me" (single version; writer: Krieger)	3:14
14.	"Wild Child" (single version; writer: Morrison)	2:39
15.	"Wishful Sinful" (single version; writer: Krieger)	2:57
16.	"Who Scared You" (writer: Morrison/Krieger)	3:55
17.	"Tell All the People" (single version; writer: Krieger)	3:33
18.	"Easy Ride" (single version; writer: Morrison)	2:44
19.	"Runnin' Blue" (writer: Krieger)	2:30
20.	"Do It" (single edit; writers: Morrison/Krieger)	3:06
21.	"You Make Me Real" (mono single version; writer: Morrison)	2:55
22.	"Roadhouse Blues" (mono single edit; writers: Morrison/The Doors)	3:48
23.	"Love Her Madly" (single edit)	2:51
24.	"(You Need Meat) Don't Go No Further" (writer: Willie Dixon)	3:41
25.	"Riders on the Storm" (single edit)	4:54
26.	"Changeling" (single edit)	3:27

Disc two
No.	Title	Length
1.	"Tightrope Ride" (single edit; writers: Manzarek/Krieger)	3:39
2.	"Variety Is the Spice of Life" (writer: Krieger)	2:52
3.	"Ships w/ Sails" (single edit; writers: Krieger/Densmore)	4:12
4.	"In the Eye of the Sun" (writer: Manzarek)	4:49
5.	"Get Up and Dance" (writers: Manzarek/Krieger)	2:38
6.	"Treetrunk" (writer: Krieger)	3:0
7.	"The Mosquito" (mono single edit; writers: Krieger/Densmore/Manzarek)	2:50
8.	"It Slipped My Mind" (writer: Krieger)	3:12
9.	"The Piano Bird" (single edit; writers: Densmore/Jack Conrad)	4:11
10.	"Good Rockin'" (single edit; writer: Roy Brown)	3:22
11.	"Roadhouse Blues" (live; writers: Morrison/The Doors)	4:15
12.	"Albinoni: Adagio"	2:13
13.	"Gloria" (live; single edit; writer: Van Morrison)	3:13
14.	"Moonlight Drive" (live)	5:37

Bonus tracks (CD versions only)
No.	Title	Length
15.	"Hello, I Love You" (mono radio version)	2:21
16.	"Touch Me" (mono radio version; writer: Krieger)	3:14
17.	"Wishful Sinful" (mono radio version; writer: Krieger)	2:56
18.	"Tell All the People" (mono radio version; writer: Krieger)	3:08

Blu-ray: The Best of the Doors (1973 Quadraphonic Mix) (3-Disc 2CD + Blu-ray version only)
No.	Title	Length
1.	"Who Do You Love" (Ellas McDaniel)	6:24
2.	"Soul Kitchen"	3:34
3.	"Hello, I Love You"	2:17
4.	"People Are Strange"	2:12
5.	"Riders on the Storm"	7:17
6.	"Touch Me" (Krieger)	3:13
7.	"Love Her Madly"	3:22
8.	"Love Me Two Times"	3:15
9.	"Take It as It Comes"	2:17
10.	"Moonlight Drive"	3:03
11.	"Light My Fire"	7:10

== Charts ==
Chart (2017)	Peak position
Austrian Albums (Ö3 Austria)	50
Belgian Albums (Ultratop Flanders)	74
Belgian Albums (Ultratop Wallonia)	64
Czech Albums (ČNS IFPI)	61
Dutch Albums (Album Top 100)	71
German Albums (Offizielle Top 100)	28
Hungarian Albums (MAHASZ)	24
Irish Albums (IRMA)	85
Portuguese Albums (AFP)	12
Scottish Albums (Official Charts)	37
Spanish Albums (Promusicae)	29
Swiss Albums (Schweizer Hitparade)	87
UK Albums (Official Charts)	77
US Billboard 200	147
