= The Best of The Doors (1973 album) =

Greatest hits album by the Doors
- Released: September 10, 1973
- Recorded: 1966–1971
- Genre: Rock
- Length: 43:52
- Label: Elektra
- Producers: Paul A. Rothchild; Bruce Botnick; the Doors

The Doors chronology
Full Circle (1972)	The Best of The Doors (1973)	An American Prayer (1978)

The Best of the Doors is a compilation album by the American rock band the Doors, released in September 1973 by Elektra Records. It was the third compilation album to be released by the band and contains seven of the Doors' eight Top 40 hits.

== Critical reception ==
Professional ratings
Review scores
Source	Rating
AllMusic	4.5/5 stars
Christgau's Record Guide	B

Critic Robert Christgau gave the compilation a "B" rating, while AllMusic's William Ruhlmann rated it four and a half out of five stars. The latter commented that at the time of its release, "it was the best Doors greatest-hits collection on the market", but noted that most of the material is found on the more comprehensive The Best of the Doors first released in 1985.

== Releases ==
The songs on the album were re-mixed for four channel quadraphonic sound and the album was originally released on LP in the CD-4 Quadradisc format. The album was also released on quadraphonic 8-Track tape and Reel-to-reel tape formats. In 1980, the LP was reissued in a two-channel stereo version through the Columbia House record club.

In 2015, Audio Fidelity released the original quadraphonic mix of The Best of the Doors in the hybrid Super Audio CD format. Steve Hoffman mastered the release at Marsh Mastering. This version also contains the same content in stereo.

In 2017, the quad mix was released on Blu-ray Audio, in the triple disc edition of the compilation The Singles.

== Track listing ==
All tracks are written by the Doors (Jim Morrison, Ray Manzarek, Robby Krieger and John Densmore), except as noted. Details are taken from the 1973 U.S. Elektra release; other releases may show different information.

Side one
No.	Title	Original album (year)	Length
1.	"Who Do You Love?" (Ellas McDaniel a.k.a. Bo Diddley)	Absolutely Live (1970)	6:48
2.	"Soul Kitchen"	The Doors (1967)	3:30
3.	"Hello, I Love You"	Waiting for the Sun (1968)	2:23
4.	"People Are Strange"	Strange Days (1967)	2:10
5.	"Riders on the Storm"	L.A. Woman (1971)	7:05

Side two
No.	Title	Original album (year)	Length
1.	"Touch Me"	The Soft Parade (1969)	3:15
2.	"Love Her Madly"	L.A. Woman	3:20
3.	"Love Me Two Times"	Strange Days	3:16
4.	"Take It as It Comes"	The Doors	2:14
5.	"Moonlight Drive"	Strange Days	3:01
6.	"Light My Fire"	The Doors	6:50

== Personnel ==
From the 1973 Elektra album:

- Jim Morrison – vocals
- Robbie Krieger – guitar
- Ray Manzarek – piano, organ, bass keyboards, marimba
- John Densmore – drums
