= A Collection (The Doors album) =

Box set by the Doors
- Released: July 5, 2011
- Recorded: 1966–1971
- Genre: Rock
- Length: 236:01
- Labels: Elektra; Rhino
- Producers: Paul A. Rothchild; Bruce Botnick; The Doors

The Doors chronology
When You're Strange: Music from the Motion Picture (2010)	A Collection (2011)	The Singles (2017)

Professional ratings
Review scores
Source	Rating
AllMusic	4.5/5 stars

A Collection is a six compact disc box set by the Doors, released by Elektra and Rhino Records on July 5, 2011.

This collection packages the complete anthology of the Doors albums before Jim Morrison's death in 1971. It features the 40th anniversary versions of the tracks, remastered by Bruce Botnick, and original artwork in replicated paper sleeves. The bonus tracks that are included in the individual 40th anniversary versions are not included in this boxset. The albums are placed in chronological order.

== Albums ==
All studio albums with Jim Morrison currently available in the box set were released on Elektra Records.

1. The Doors (1967)
2. Strange Days (1967)
3. Waiting for the Sun (1968)
4. The Soft Parade (1969)
5. Morrison Hotel (1970)
6. L.A. Woman (1971)

== Charts and certifications ==
=== Charts ===
Chart (2011)	Peak position
French Albums (SNEP)	146
Italian Albums (FIMI)	32
Spanish Albums (Promusicae)	48

=== Certifications ===
Region	Certification	Certified units/sales
Poland (ZPAV)	Platinum	20,000^{*}
^{*} Sales figures based on certification alone.

== Personnel ==
The Doors

- Jim Morrison – lead vocals
- Ray Manzarek – piano, organ, keyboards & bass
- Robby Krieger – guitar
- John Densmore – drums

Additional musicians

- Larry Knechtel (uncredited) – bass guitar on tracks 2, 4, 6–8, & 10 of The Doors
- Douglass Lubahn – bass guitar on tracks 1–3, 6–9 (of Strange Days), 1–5, 7, 9–11 (of Waiting for the Sun), 5–6, & 8 (of The Soft Parade)
- Kerry Magness – bass guitar on track 6 of Waiting for the Sun
- Leroy Vinnegar – acoustic bass on track 7 of Waiting for the Sun
- Curtis Amy – saxophone solo on track 2 of The Soft Parade
- Reinol Andino – conga on "The Soft Parade"
- George Bohanan – trombone on tracks 1, 2, 7, and 8 of The Soft Parade
- Harvey Brooks – bass guitar on tracks 1 to 4, 7 and 9 of The Soft Parade
- Jimmy Buchanan – fiddle on track 7 of The Soft Parade
- Jesse McReynolds – mandolin on track 2 of The Soft Parade
- Champ Webb – English horn solo on track 8 of The Soft Parade
- Paul Harris – orchestral arrangements on tracks 1, 2, 7, and 8 of The Soft Parade
- Lonnie Mack – bass guitar on tracks 1 and 11 of Morrison Hotel
- Ray Neapolitan – bass guitar on tracks 2 to 9 of Morrison Hotel
- John Sebastian (credited as "G. Puglese") – harmonica on track 1 of Morrison Hotel
- Jerry Scheff – bass guitar on L.A. Woman
- Marc Benno – additional guitar on L.A. Woman

Technical

- Paul A. Rothchild – producer of all albums except L.A. Woman
- Bruce Botnick – co-producer of L.A. Woman; engineer for all the albums included
