= Live in Philadelphia '70 =

Live album by the Doors
- Released: November 29, 2005
- Recorded: May 1, 1970
- Venues: The Spectrum, Pennsylvania
- Genres: Psychedelic rock; acid rock; blues rock
- Length: 103:45
- Labels: Rhino; Bright Midnight Archives
- Producer: Bruce Botnick

The Doors chronology
Boot Yer Butt: The Doors Bootlegs (2003)	Live in Philadelphia '70 (2005)	Live in Boston (2007)

Professional ratings
Review scores
Source	Rating
AllMusic	3.5/5 stars

Live in Philadelphia '70 is a double live album recorded by American rock band the Doors in 1970. The performance took place in The Spectrum. This is part of previously unreleased material of the Bright Midnight Archives collection of live albums by the Doors.

== Track listing ==
All tracks written by the Doors except where noted.

=== Disc one ===
1. "Announcer 'Sit Down'" − 5:20
2. "Tuning" − 1:25
3. "Roadhouse Blues" (Jim Morrison) − 4:40
4. "Break On Through (To the Other Side)" (Morrison) − 5:12
5. "Back Door Man/Love Hides" (Willie Dixon, Chester Burnett/Morrison) − 6:51
6. "Ship of Fools" (Morrison) − 6:55
7. "Universal Mind" (Morrison) − 4:31
8. "When the Music's Over" − 14:27
9. "Mystery Train (Junior Parker)/Away in India" − 13:21
10. "Wake Up!" (Morrison) − 1:46
11. "Light My Fire" (Krieger, Morrison) − 11:46

=== Disc two ===
1. "The Concert Continues" − 0:46
2. "Maggie M'Gill" (Morrison) − 5:49
3. "Roadhouse Blues" (Reprise) (Morrison) − 2:39
4. "Been Down So Long / Rock Me Baby" (Morrison) (B.B. King) − 9:31
5. "The Music Capital of the World, Philadelphia" − 0:29
6. "Carol" (Chuck Berry) − 1:48
7. "Soul Kitchen" (Morrison) − 6:15

== Personnel ==
- Jim Morrison - lead vocals
- Ray Manzarek - organ, keyboard bass, guitar ("Maggie M'Gill", "Roadhouse Blues (Reprise)", "Been Down So Long/Rock Me Baby", "Carol"), vocals
- John Densmore - drums
- Robby Krieger - guitar, electric bass ("Maggie M'Gill", "Roadhouse Blues (Reprise)", "Been Down So Long/Rock Me Baby", "Carol")
