= Live in Boston (The Doors album) =

Live album by the Doors
- Released: July 24, 2007
- Recorded: April 10, 1970
- Venues: Boston Arena, Massachusetts
- Genre: Rock
- Length: 187:46
- Labels: Rhino; Bright Midnight Archives
- Producer: Bruce Botnick

The Doors chronology
Live in Philadelphia '70 (2005)	Live in Boston (2007)	The Very Best of The Doors (2007)

Professional ratings
Review scores
Source	Rating
AllMusic	3.5/5 stars

Live in Boston is a triple CD live album by American rock band the Doors released in 2007. It was recorded at the Boston Arena on April 10, 1970, during the band's Roadhouse Blues Tour. The band performed two shows, one starting at 7 pm and a second scheduled for 10 but not actually starting until past midnight. Jim Morrison appears to be intoxicated during the entire latter show, and continued drinking heavily throughout the performance. The late start ended with the venue's owners cutting power to the stage to force the end of the concert.

The album was released from the Bright Midnight Archives collection which contains a number of previously unreleased live concerts by the Doors.

== Background ==
Ray Manzarek, the band's keyboardist recalls the concert as "manic, wild, crazy, intoxicated", adding:

… the shaman was intoxicated in Boston. I don't know if you're allowed to even be a shaman in Boston. But Morrison sure as hell did it! Still, as intoxicated as Jim was, it was never a problem. Even in his most intoxicated state, he'd hit the musical cues. When we’d play "Light My Fire", you could solo as long as you wanted – and sometimes we did! – and then Jim would scream, improvise, add poetry, or whatever, sang some things that he felt like doing.

== Track listing ==
=== Disc 1 ===
- 1st show, 7 p.m.
1. "Start" – (0:07)
2. "All Right, All Right, All Right" - (0:10)
3. "Roadhouse Moan" – (1:33)
4. "Roadhouse Blues" (Jim Morrison) – (4:56)
5. "Ship of Fools" (Morrison) - (6:27)
6. "Alabama Song (Whisky Bar)" (Bertolt Brecht, Kurt Weill) (2:02)
7. "Back Door Man" (Willie Dixon, Chester Burnett) (2:16)
8. "Five to One" (Morrison) (9:09)
9. "When the Music's Over" (14:45)
10. "Rock Me" (B.B. King) (7:14)
11. "Mystery Train" (Junior Parker) (7:18)
12. "Away in India" (1:54)
13. "Crossroads" (Robert Johnson) (5:15)
14. "Prelude to 'Wake Up!'" (0:48)
15. "Wake Up!" (Morrison) (1:33)
16. "Light My Fire" (Krieger, Morrison) (12:32)

=== Disc 2 ===
- 2nd show, 10 p.m.
1. "Start" (1:22)
2. "Break On Through (To the Other Side)" (Morrison) (8:12)
3. "I Believe in Democracy" (0:33)
4. "When the Music's Over" (14:19)
5. "Roadhouse Blues" (Morrison) (5:53)
6. "The Spy" (Morrison) (5:43)
7. "Alabama Song (Whisky Bar)" (Brecht, Weill) (1:40)
8. "Back Door Man" (Dixon, Burnett) (2:27)
9. "Five to One" (Morrison) (7:06)
10. "Astrology Rap" (0:45)
11. "Build Me a Woman" (Morrison) (3:57)
12. "You Make Me Real" (Morrison) (3:26)
13. "Wait a Minute!" (0:44)
14. "Mystery Train" (Parker) (7:52)
15. "Away in India" (2:52)
16. "Crossroads" (Johnson) (3:31)

=== Disc 3 ===
- 2nd show, 10 p.m. (cont.)
1. "Band Intros" (0:35)
2. "Adolf Hitler" (Morrison) (0:23)
3. "Light My Fire" (Krieger, Morrison) (5:47)
4. "Fever" ["Light My Fire" Cont'd] (0:23)
5. "Summertime" ["Light My Fire" Cont'd] (7:29)
6. "St. James Infirmary Blues" ["Light My Fire" Cont'd] (0:46)
7. "Graveyard Poem" ["Light My Fire" Cont'd] (1:13)
8. "Light My Fire" [Reprise] (Krieger) (2:11)
9. "More, More, More!" (0:19)
10. "Ladies & Gentlemen" (0:13)
11. "We Can't Instigate" (0:13)
12. "They Want More" (1:16)
13. "Been Down So Long" (Morrison) (6:13)
14. "Power Turned Off" (9:15)

== Personnel ==
- Jim Morrison – vocals
- Ray Manzarek – organ, keyboard bass, electric guitar on "Been Down So Long"
- Robby Krieger – electric guitar, bass guitar on "Been Down So Long"
- John Densmore – drums
