= Brides (album) =

Music album by Annabel Lamb (1987)

Studio album by Annabel Lamb
- Released: 1987
- Studio: The Justice Room
- Genre: Pop, rock
- Length: 44:53
- Label: RCA Records
- Producer: Annabel Lamb, Wally Brill

Annabel Lamb chronology
When Angels Travel (1986)	Brides (1987)	Justice (1988)

Brides is a music album released in 1987 by English singer Annabel Lamb. Its original release on vinyl contained ten tracks, including a cover of the Velvet Underground's 1970 song, "Sweet Jane". An additional bonus track was added when the compact disc version was released.

== Track listing ==
- All songs written by Annabel Lamb, except where noted

No.	Title	Length
1.	"Chase Across the World"	4:31
2.	"Different Drum" (Leonard Bernstein, Stephen Sondheim, Mark Damron)	4:34
3.	"Country of Love" (Lamb, Scott Davidson)	4:44
4.	"Nada (Trick of the Light)" (Lamb, Liam Sternberg)	4:16
5.	"Baby Baby"	5:24
6.	"Come to Me"	3:50
7.	"Sweet Jane" (Lou Reed)	4:20
8.	"Don't Talk About Love" (Lamb, Dani Ali)	3:57
9.	"Simple Truth"	5:20
10.	"In the Land of Dreamy Dreams"	3:57
11.	"Lonely House" (Elmer Rice, Kurt Weill, Langston Hughes; bonus track)	5:08
