= Annabel Lamb =

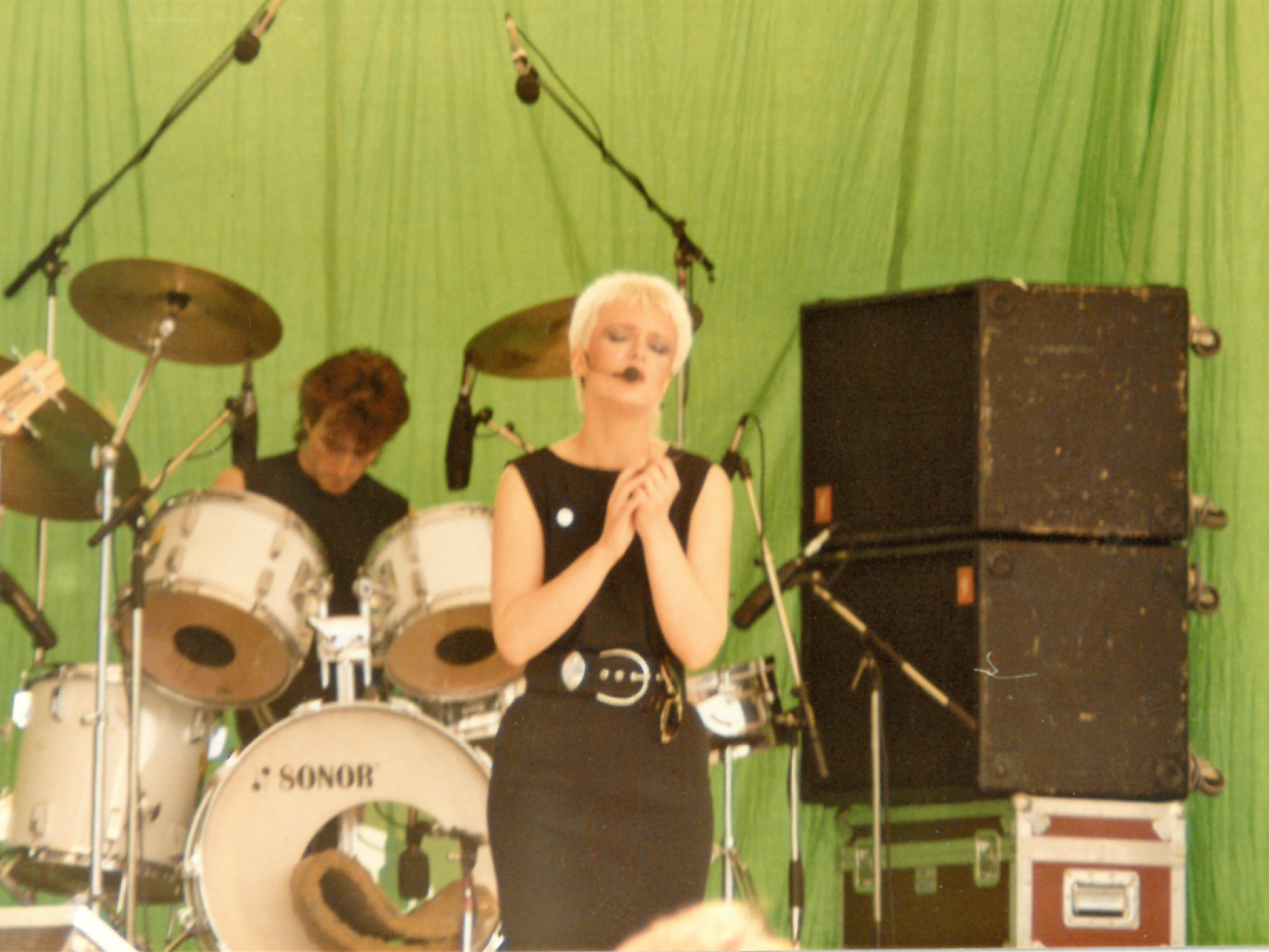
- Annabel Lamb at Kalvøyafestivalen in 1984

Background information
- Born: Annabel Lamb; 28 September 1955 (age 71); Surrey, England
- Genres: New wave, synth-pop, experimental rock
- Occupation: Singer
- Instruments: Vocals, keyboards
- Years active: 1982–present
- Label: A&M
- Website: Annabel Lamb homepage

Annabel Lamb (born 28 September 1955) is an English singer-songwriter. She has released eight albums beginning with her debut album, Once Bitten. As well as her recording and touring career, Lamb has co-written songs with many other artists, notably the song "Amazed Are We" for Maxi Priest. She has also been a session singer and musician for Toni Basil and Tina Charles.

== Career ==
Annabel Lamb, on Riders on the Storm (1984)

Annabel Lamb has released eight albums to date. She had a British Top 30 hit in 1983 with her cover version of The Doors song, "Riders on the Storm", her only hit in the UK Singles Chart. She appeared performing the song on Top of the Pops later that year. Her debut album, Once Bitten, included a guest appearance by Marillion vocalist, Steve Hogarth on keyboards. Her second album, The Flame, spent one week at Number 84 in the UK Albums Chart in April 1984. She has been diverse at times, her earlier albums showing new wave, synth-pop, experimental rock, jazz and ethnic influences.

Lamb has been a session singer and musician for Toni Basil and Tina Charles. As well as her recording and touring career, Lamb has co-written songs with many other artists, notably the song "Amazed Are We" for Maxi Priest. Amongst her influences, she lists James Taylor, Bonnie Raitt, Jane Siberry, Fairport Convention, and Paul Brady.

Lamb has a son, Henry Brill, with her former producer and husband, Wally Brill. She toured throughout Europe since 2008 with Kiki Dee and Carmelo Luggeri as a backing vocalist.

== Discography ==
=== Albums ===
- Once Bitten (1983) – including "Red for Danger", Rereleased with a different cover and "Riders on the Storm" included
- The Flame (1984) – reissued on CD in 2010 by Cherry Red, including bonus tracks and B-sides
- When Angels Travel (1986)
- Brides (1987)
- Justice (1988)
- Heartland (1988) – compilation album
- Flow (1993)

=== Singles ===
Year	Single	Peak positions				Album
Year	Single	UK	AUS	NED	SWE	Album
1982	"Tell Him / All Night T.V."	–	—	—	—	
1982	"I Know How Love Goes / Electronic Toys"	–	—	—	—	
1982	"Cinderella / Safety in Numbers"	–	—	—	—	Once Bitten
1983	"Once Bitten"	–	—	—	—	Once Bitten
1983	"Heartland"	–	—	—	—	Once Bitten
1983	"Riders on the Storm"	27	98	–	18	Once Bitten
1984	"The Flame"	92	—	—	—	The Flame
1984	"So Lucky in Bed"	–	—	—	—	The Flame
1986	"When Angels Travel"	–	—	—	—	When Angels Travel
1986	"African Affair"	–	—	—	—	When Angels Travel
1987	"Different Drum"	–	—	—	—	Brides
1987	"Country of Love"	–	—	—	—	Brides
1987	"Chase Across the World"	–	—	—	—	Brides
1987	"Talk to Me" (theme from Damon & Debbie)	–	—	—	—	Single only
1988	"The Ghost of You"	–	—	—	—	Justice
1989	"Refugee"	–	—	44	—	Justice
1993	"Pistols at Dawn"	–	—	—	—	Flow
1993	"Wild World"	–	—	—	—	Flow
"—" denotes releases that did not chart or were not released.

== See also ==
- List of new wave artists
- List of A&M Records artists
- List of performers on Top of the Pops
