= Once Bitten (Annabel Lamb album) =

Studio album by Annabel Lamb
- Released: February 1983
- Recorded: November & December 1982
- Genre: New wave
- Label: A&M
- Producer: Wally Brill

Annabel Lamb chronology
Once Bitten (1983)	The Flame (1984)

Professional ratings
Review scores
Source	Rating
Sounds	4.5/5 stars

Once Bitten was Annabel Lamb's 1983 debut album. The U.S. version of the album differed from the U.K. release and as well as different cover artwork, contained the single "Riders on the Storm" which was not present on the original U.K. issue.

== Track listing ==
All tracks composed by Annabel Lamb; except where indicated

1. "Once Bitten"
2. "Take Me in Your Arms"
3. "Heartland" (Adrian Borland)
4. "Hold Fast"
5. "Backwards Through the Looking Glass"
6. "Dividing the Spoils of Love" (Lamb, Mark Damron)
7. "Red for Danger"
8. "Snake Pliskin"
9. "Missing"
10. "No Cure"

== Personnel ==
- Annabel Lamb - lead vocals, backing vocals, synthesizer, piano, Hammond organ
- Chris Jarrett - guitar
- Steve Greetham - bass, fretless bass, guitar, backing vocals
- Robin Langridge - piano, synthesizer, Hammond organ, backing vocals
- Richie Stevens - drums, percussion
- John Kongos - Fairlight CMI
- Jim Dvořák - trumpet
- Adrian Borland - guitar on "Heartland"
- Steve Hogarth - piano on "Dividing the Spoils of Love"
- Colin Woore - additional guitar on "Hold Fast"
- Jeff Scantlebury - congas on "Missing"
- Paul Hirsh - panpipes on "No Cure"
