= The Flame (Annabel Lamb album) =

Studio album by Annabel Lamb
- Released: April 1984
- Recorded: 1983, 1984
- Genre: New wave
- Label: A&M
- Producers: Wally Brill, David Anderle

Annabel Lamb chronology
Once Bitten (1983)	The Flame (1984)	When Angels Travel (1986)

The Flame is a 1984 album by British singer Annabel Lamb. The album was produced by Lamb's husband Wally Brill, and David Anderle.

Aside from lead vocals, Lamb sings backing vocals on the album as well as plays the keyboards. All songs on the album were written by Lamb with the exception of "Inside of My Head", which was written by Jim Rawcliffe.

== Track listing ==
All tracks composed by Annabel Lamb; except where indicated

1. "Sacraments of Love"
2. "Hands of the Hunter"
3. "Weapon of Love"
4. "Dream Boy"
5. "What the Eye Sees"
6. "Things That I Fear"
7. "The Flame"
8. "So Lucky in Bed"
9. "Inside of My Head" (Jim Rawcliffe)
10. "Talking to Me"

== Personnel ==
- Annabel Lamb - vocals, keyboards, background vocals
- Chris Jarrett - guitar
- Kurt McGettrick - tenor saxophone
- Jim Dvořák - trumpet
- Robin Langridge - keyboards, background vocals
- Richard Gibbs - keyboards
- Alan Hodgson - drums
- Richie Stevens - drums
- Steve Greetham - bass
- Scott Breadman - percussion
- Jo Ann Harris - background vocals
- Troyé Davenport - background vocals
- Judy Brown - background vocals
- Nancy Shanks - background vocals

== Reissue ==
In 2008, Cherry Red Records reissued a UK 15-track digitally remastered CD album. The album was expanded with five bonus recordings and a picture booklet containing sleevenotes, a discography and lyrics.

2008 reissue track listing:

1. "Sacraments of Love"
2. "Hands of the Hunter"
3. "Weapon of Love"
4. "Dream Boy"
5. "What the Eye Sees"
6. "Things That I Fear"
7. "The Flame"
8. "So Lucky in Bed"
9. "Inside of My Head"
10. "Talking to Me"

Bonus recordings:

1. "So Lucky in Bed" (12" version)
2. "Venezuela"
3. "Sisters of Mercy"
4. "Riders on the Storm" (12" version)
5. "No Cure"
