= L.A. Woman =

1971 studio album by the Doors

Studio album by the Doors
- Released: April 19, 1971
- Recorded: December 1970 – January 1971
- Studios: The Doors' Workshop, Los Angeles
- Genres: Blues rock; psychedelic rock
- Length: 48:25
- Label: Elektra
- Producers: The Doors; Bruce Botnick

The Doors chronology
13 (1970)	L.A. Woman (1971)	Other Voices (1971)

Singles from L.A. Woman
- 1. "Love Her Madly" Released: March 1971; 2. "Riders on the Storm" Released: June 1971

L.A. Woman is the sixth studio album by the American rock band the Doors, released on April 19, 1971, by Elektra Records. It is the last to feature lead singer Jim Morrison during his lifetime, though he would posthumously appear on the 1978 album An American Prayer. Even more so than its predecessors, the album is heavily influenced by blues. It was recorded without producer Paul A. Rothchild after he quit the band over the perceived lack of quality in their studio performances. Subsequently, the band co-produced the album with longtime sound engineer Bruce Botnick.

"Love Her Madly" was released as a single in March 1971, preceding the album's release, and reached the Top 20 on the Billboard Hot 100. Upon release, the album peaked at number nine on the Billboard 200 and reached number 28 on the UK Albums Chart. The track "Riders on the Storm" also achieved chart success.

Critics including Richie Unterberger and David Quantick have called L.A. Woman one of the Doors' best albums, citing Morrison's vocal performance and the band's stripped-down return to their blues-rock roots.

== Background ==
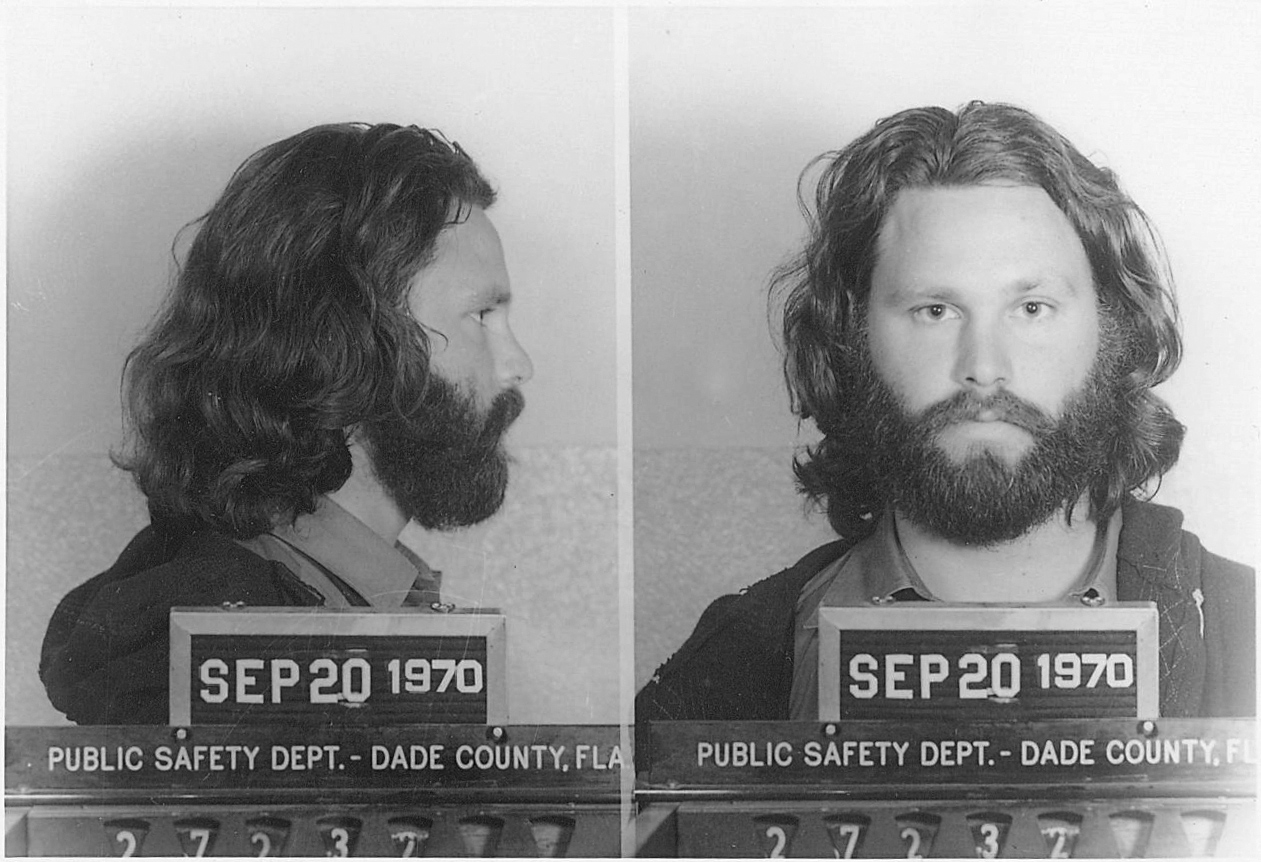
Jim Morrison on the day of his conviction in Miami for profanity and indecent exposure

The Doors had achieved commercial and critical success by 1969, but for much of that year they were blacklisted from radio playlists and their concert bookings dwindled after singer Jim Morrison had been charged with profanity and indecent exposure at a concert in Miami, Florida. Morrison had mentioned leaving the group at the end of 1968, only to be convinced by keyboardist Ray Manzarek to stay on another six months. On September 20, 1970, Morrison was convicted for the Miami incident. In a 1970 interview with Ben Fong-Torres, Morrison said of Miami, "I think subconsciously I was trying to get across in that concert, I was trying to reduce it to absurdity. And it worked too well."

In November 1970, shortly after Morrison's trial ended, the Doors entered Sunset Sound Recorders in Los Angeles to record early versions of the songs "L.A. Woman", "Riders on the Storm" and "Love Her Madly". The new songs were a departure from the heavily orchestrated pieces on the earlier album The Soft Parade, which burdened the group with long, drawn-out recording sessions. The simplified and straightforward style, progressing from Morrison Hotel, was well-received, noted by Jazz & Pop magazine as "a return to the tight fury of early Doors' music". The band conflicted with their record company, Elektra Records, who released the Doors' first compilation album, 13, to have a product for the Christmas market. It was released without the band's input, and featured a large image of a younger Morrison, upsetting him enough to threaten signing with another label. As their contract required one more album, the group were unable to follow through with the threat, so they continued rehearsing the new material.

Record producer Paul A. Rothchild, who worked with the band on their first five albums, attended the early sessions but quit following friction with the band. This included his dissatisfaction with the song "Love Her Madly", which "drove [him] out of the studio." He felt that recording the composition was a step backwards artistically, calling it "cocktail music." Rothchild has denied a popular rumor that claimed he directed the remark toward "Riders on the Storm", explaining that he thought that song and "L.A. Woman" were "excellent in rehearsal". He maintains that his cocktail music comment was said to "make [the group] angry enough to do something good." Rothchild was frustrated that the group was slow in developing new material, especially as the band contained three songwriters. He was unable to persuade Morrison to consistently attend rehearsals. As Bruce Botnick revealed in the book Love Becomes a Funeral Pyre, another issue that led to Rothchild's leaving was the emotional devastation he felt at the death of Janis Joplin, having worked with her on Pearl. Rothchild left before any master takes were complete, recommending that the Doors co-produce L.A. Woman with Botnick, the sound engineer who had worked with Rothchild on the band's previous recordings. The artist Eve Babitz is cited as the woman who inspired the lyrics of the title song.

== Recording ==
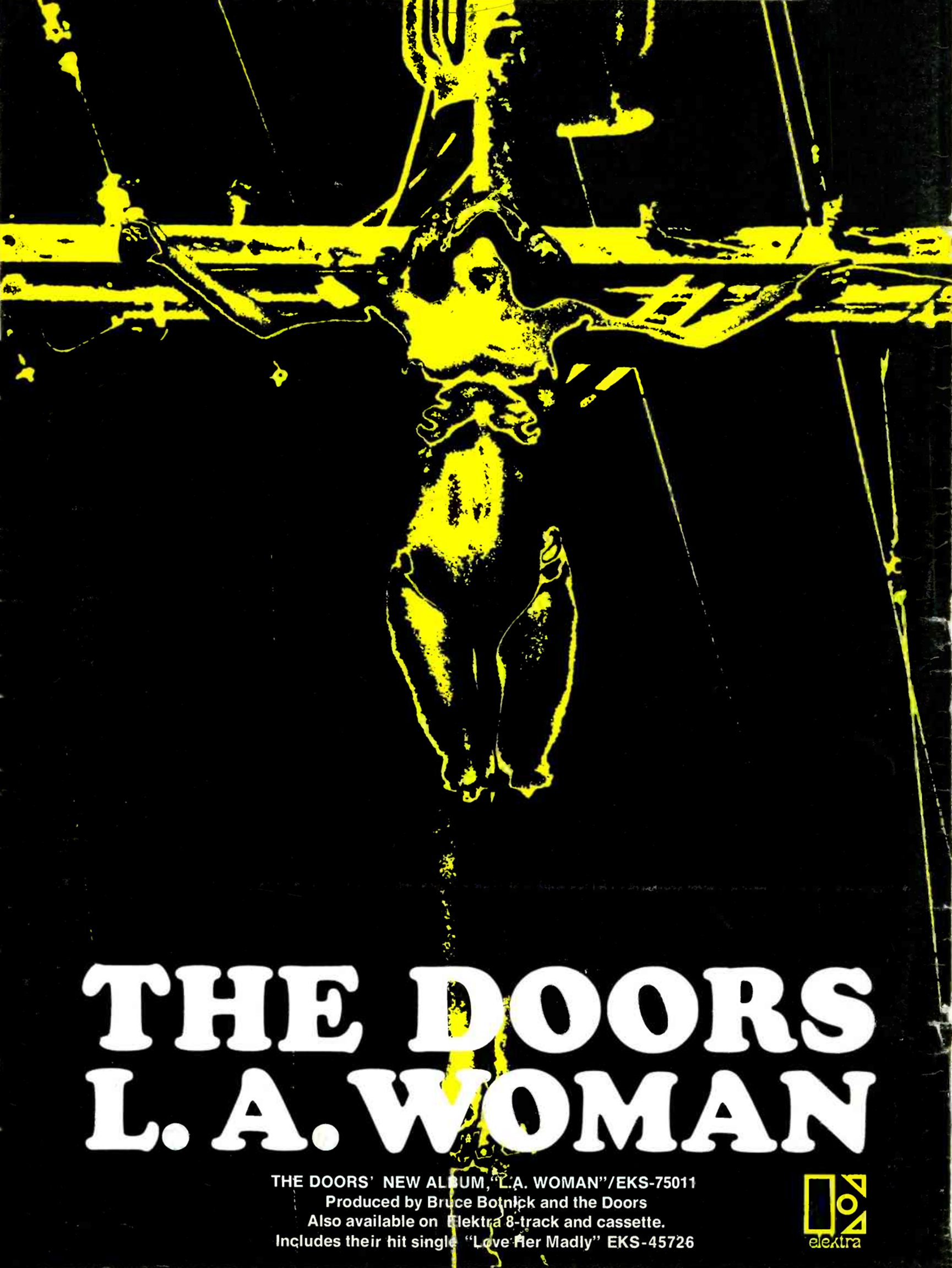
Billboard advertisement, May 1, 1971

The group and Botnick organized a makeshift recording studio at their private rehearsal space, the Doors' Workshop, a two-story building at 8512 Santa Monica Boulevard. They could then record in a more comfortable and relaxed setting while avoiding the expenses of a professional studio. A mixing console previously owned by Elektra was installed upstairs in the Workshop, while studio monitors, microphones, and keyboards were set up downstairs. To compensate for the lack of an isolated vocal booth, Morrison recorded in the bathroom doorway, singing into the same microphone used on the Doors' final tour. According to Botnick, Morrison was easy to work with and spent long hours in the studio with little consumption of alcohol.

For recording, Elvis Presley's bassist Jerry Scheff and rhythm guitarist Marc Benno were brought in to provide additional backing. Densmore characterized Scheff as "an in-the-pocket man" for his steady supportive role, and praised how Scheff "allowed me to communicate rhythmically with Morrison, and he slowed Ray down, when his right hand on the keyboards got too darn fast". By all accounts, Morrison – a huge Presley fan – was excited by Scheff's participation. In addition, Benno was asked to participate as a result of his recent notoriety from working with Leon Russell. The songs were completed in a few takes on a professional-quality 8-track recorder, (Note: With the exception of "Hyacinth House" which was recorded on a four track tape machine, as confirmed by guitarist Robby Krieger.) and the album was finished in six days. Morrison was a blues enthusiast and proclaimed the final recording session as "blues day", recording "Crawling King Snake", "Cars Hiss by My Window", and "L.A. Woman". The album had a raw, live sound with overdubs mostly limited to additional keyboards. Botnick explained, "The overall concept for the recording session was to go back to our early roots and try to get everything live in the studio with as few overdubs as possible". Mixing was completed at Poppi Studios in West Hollywood, by which time Morrison had moved to Paris.

== Music ==
The band began recording without much material and needed to compose songs on the spot, either by jamming or talking through ideas. In a 1994 interview, guitarist Robby Krieger stated, "Rothchild was gone, which is one reason why we had so much fun. The warden was gone." Despite its troubled beginnings, L.A. Woman contains some of the Doors' most critically acclaimed songs, as well as some of their most blues-oriented. Lyrically, the album deals with contemporary topics such as love, life in Los Angeles, and complex aspects of the human experience. Manzarek explained the band did not "approach the album with one vision, but after we started working on the songs, we realized that they're talking about L.A. They're about men, women, boys, girls, love, loss, lovers-lost, and lovers-found in Los Angeles". The album, as a whole, demonstrated Morrison's songwriting abilities, combined with his poetic phrasing and enthusiasm for Los Angeles but still a desire to leave the city with his partner, Pamela Courson. Artistically, L.A. Woman saw the band mixing blues and rock, with some elements of psychedelic and jazz rock of their early career.

=== Songs ===
==== Side one ====
L.A. Woman opens with the Morrison-penned track "The Changeling", which the Doors wanted to be the album's first single. Taken from one of Morrison's journals written in 1968, Holzman overruled the group's decision in favor of "Love Her Madly" and the non-album B-side "(You Need Meat) Don't Go No Further". Morrison also contributed "Been Down So Long", a song inspired by folk singer Richard Fariña's book Been Down So Long It Looks Like Up to Me and Furry Lewis's tune, "I Will Turn Your Money Green". A conventional blues song reminiscent of Morrison's potential imprisonment from earlier Doors performances, the lyrics showed depression, liberation, and sexuality. Additionally, Morrison wrote the blues number "Cars Hiss by My Window". Unlike most of the other tracks, it was composed in the studio. Manzarek recalled that "Jim said it was about living in Venice [Beach], in a hot room, with a hot girlfriend, and an open window, and a bad time. It could have been about Pamela Courson". Of the remaining self-written material on L.A. Woman, Krieger wrote "Love Her Madly", which echoed his songs of romance and insecurity. He wrote the song, at his house, to alleviate his boredom during Morrison's trial.

L.A. Woman closes its first side with the title track, the lengthiest song on the album. Thought of as Morrison's final goodbye to Los Angeles, it communicated his mixed feelings of passion and disdain for "the city of night". The lyrics feature an anagram for Jim Morrison: "Mr. Mojo Risin'". Krieger's electric guitar effect at the introduction impersonates the sound of an accelerated automobile engine.

==== Side two ====
In addition to "The Changeling", the Doors chose to incorporate three other compositions written before 1971: "L' America", "Crawling King Snake", and "The WASP (Texas Radio and the Big Beat)". "L'America" was intended for the soundtrack of director Michelangelo Antonioni's 1970 counterculture film Zabriskie Point, but ultimately rejected. Manzarek recalled, "Antonioni was interested in using it in Zabriskie Point. So we played it for him, and it was so loud, it pinned him up against the wall. When it was over, he thanked us and fled. So he turned to Pink Floyd, as European filmmakers tend to do when they want rock & roll." Previously titled "Latin America", it was originally written and recorded during the sessions for Morrison Hotel, and the only work during the L.A. Woman sessions with a few drum overdubs. The Doors' arrangement of the traditional "Crawling King Snake" dates back to their early tours, and was sometimes coupled with Morrison's poem "Celebration of the Lizard". "The WASP (Texas Radio and the Big Beat)" is a reworking of Morrison's sample of poetry first appearing on the group's souvenir books in 1968.

L.A. Woman also features "Hyacinth House", with lyrics written by Morrison and music by Manzarek. The song shows Manzarek being influenced by the Polish composer Frédéric Chopin's Polonaise in A-flat major, Op. 53, during its organ solo. The final track was "Riders on the Storm", a collective effort by the Doors. Based on the arrangement "Ghost Riders in the Sky" and the line "delicate riders of the storm", taken from Hart Crane's poem "Praise for an Urn", the track melded Morrison's hitchhiker imagery from his own poetry projects. The faint, ghostly backdrop heard throughout the song was the last recording of Morrison as a member of the Doors.

== Live performances ==
After Morrison recorded poetry at Village Recorders on December 8, 1970, he felt encouraged to play some L.A. Woman material on tour. On December 11, the Doors performed in front of two sold-out audiences at the State Fair Music Hall in Dallas. The band opened the first concert with an extended "Love Her Madly", but struggled on older material as they had not played live since the Isle of Wight FestivaI that August. The set included "The Changeling" and "L.A. Woman" and closed with "When the Music's Over". The concerts were well received, proving the Doors were still a capable live act and leading to an extra performance in Louisiana. Audience recordings from the Doors' performances of "Love Her Madly", "The Changeling", "L.A. Woman", and the Morrison Hotel track "Ship of Fools" were included on the 2003 album Boot Yer Butt: The Doors Bootlegs.

On December 12, the Doors played the Warehouse in New Orleans for what turned out to be their last live performance with Morrison. Midway through the set, a drunk Morrison began slurring the lyrics to "Light My Fire", interrupted with speeches and jokes. He sat in front of the drum platform in between Krieger and Manzarek's solos, but did not stand up to finish the song. After prompting by Densmore, he tried to sing, before bashing the mic stand into the stage until its wood splintered. The Doors agreed to stop touring and focus on completing L.A. Woman.

For years, fans speculated over the possible recordings of the New Orleans concert. In 2011, George Friedman, a stage manager of the Warehouse, revealed he had a reel to reel recording of the gig secured in a safety deposit box. He explained he discovered the tapes "when Beaver Productions moved its offices out of the Warehouse, Uptown into a building at the Riverbend. The Doors tape, along with a stack of other Warehouse show tapes, were cast off and left behind as debris during the move". Despite the confirmation of their existence, there has yet to be an official release of the recordings.

== Release and reception ==
I'm glad that L.A. Woman was our last album ... It really captured what we were all about. The first record did too but L.A. Woman is more loose, it's live – it sounds almost like a rehearsal. It's pure Doors.

— Robby Krieger reflecting on the album during a 2012 interview

L.A. Woman was released on April 19, 1971. It reached number nine on the Billboard 200, remaining on the charts for 36 weeks, and reached number 28 in the UK, spending four weeks on the UK Albums Charts. The first cover pressing had a burgundy-colored, curved-corner cardboard cutout sleeve, framing a clear embossed cellophane insert, glued in from behind. Photography was credited to Wendell Hamick. According to Jac Holzman, chief executive officer of Elektra Records: "I wasn't sure there would be another album ever, so I had Bill Harvey create a collector's cover. The Doors' faces were printed on clear film. The backing color of the inner sleeve could be changed and would affect the mood of the package. This is the first album in which Jim is bearded on the front cover. His photo is on the right, no bigger, no smaller than the others, just another guy in the band."

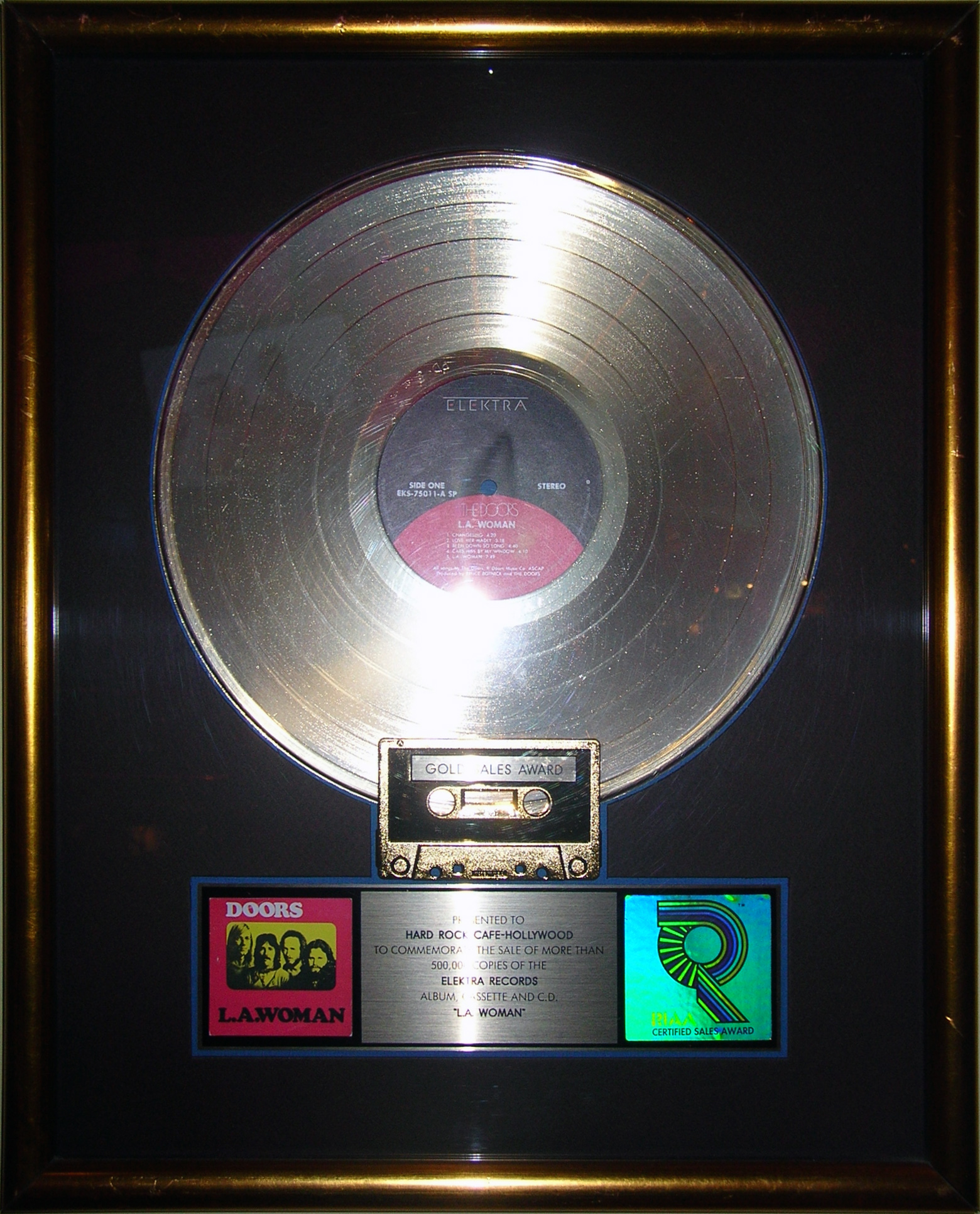
Golden Award for L.A. Woman, photographed in Hard Rock Café.

Two and a half months after release on July 3, Morrison was found dead. There had been discussions between Morrison and the others for future recording after he returned from Paris. The album was accompanied by the "Love Her Madly" single, which was released in March and charted at number 11 on the Billboard Hot 100 for a stay of 11 weeks but failed to chart in the UK. An additional single, "Riders on the Storm", was edited and released in June, and reached number 14 on the Billboard chart, while managing to peak at number 22 in the UK chart.

Professional ratings
Retrospective professional ratings
Aggregate scores
Source	Rating
Metacritic	93/100
Review scores
Source	Rating
AllMusic	4.5/5 stars
Christgau's Record Guide	A−
Classic Rock	7/10
Encyclopedia of Popular Music	4/5 stars
Music Story	5/5 stars
MusicHound	4/5
PopMatters	8/10
Rolling Stone	4.5/5 stars
Slant Magazine	3.5/5 stars
Uncut	5/5 stars

The album received mostly positive reviews. Rolling Stone's Robert Meltzer was impressed by the sense of fun and the togetherness of the band, saying it was "the Doors' greatest album" and the best album of the year. Reviewing in New Musical Express, critic Roy Carr called it "one of their best in sometime," praising it as having "great depth, vigour and presence." Melody Maker wrote an unfavorable review, praising the "effective electric piano" of "Riders on the Storm", but finding the rest of the album as just "staleness", and that it's "all so obvious that originality has left them". In Christgau's Record Guide: Rock Albums of the Seventies (1981), Robert Christgau appreciated Morrison's sense of humor in some of the lyrics and believed "the band has never sounded better", although he was disappointed with "Been Down So Long" and "L'America". In his 1994 book The Complete Guide to the Music of The Doors, Peter K. Hogan describes the album as an expansion on the style from Morrison Hotel, but in a more coherent form. He also believed L.A. Woman was a fitting swan song for Morrison, who was pleased to finally record a blues-oriented album.

Sal Cinquemani, reviewing the album for Slant Magazine, considers L.A. Woman to be "the sound of a band in perfect harmony". He describes the Doors' material as "disturbing and cynical over the years, and these songs were no exception". PopMatters's Nathan Wisnicki said Morrison's lyrics were less pretentious than previous work because of L.A. Woman's "more conventional blues". Stephen Dalton of Classic Rock, reviewing the 40th Anniversary Edition of the album, remarks how "the original L.A. Woman still stands proud, an all-time classic journey into bright shining darkness." David Quantick from BBC Music attributed the record's success to "a stripped-down yet full sound, a developed mysticism tied tightly to the band's brand of rock, and confidence born of having been a functioning unit for several years". Richie Unterberger, writing for AllMusic, described L.A. Woman as "uneven", but noted that the album contains compositions that "rate among their finest and most disturbing work".

In 2003, L.A. Woman was ranked number 362 on Rolling Stone magazine's list of the "500 Greatest Albums of All Time". When the list was revised in 2012, to accommodate a number of albums released since 2003, the album was repositioned at number 364. Both Ultimate Classic Rock and Stereogum named it the Doors' second best album, with the latter's Ryan Leas adding in the website, "It traveled the same raw blues-rock lane as its predecessor, but now the Doors sounded ragged, bleary. It's one of those early-'70s records that comes off like a beleaguered hangover from the end of the '60s." Online newspaper The Independent cited L.A. Woman the twelfth best album of 1971, while Ultimate Classic Rock included it among the "Top 100 '70s Rock Albums".

=== Reissues and remasters ===
In 1988, L.A. Woman was digitally remastered by Botnick and Paul A. Rothchild at Digital Magnetics, using the original master tapes. DCC Compact Classics reissued the album on 24kt gold CD in 1993 and on 180g vinyl in 1998, both versions were mastered by Steve Hoffman. It was remastered again in 1999 for The Complete Studio Recordings box set by Bernie Grundman and Botnick at Bernie Grundman Mastering, using 96khz/24bit technology; it was also released as a standalone CD release. This was followed by a 5.1 surround version of the album, released on DVD-Audio on December 19, 2000; the surround mix was created by Botnick from the original eight-track analog 1" master tapes. In 2006, all six of the Doors' albums with Morrison were remixed in stereo and 5.1 for the Perception box set. This edition of L.A. Woman includes two bonus tracks ("Orange County Suite" and "(You Need Meat) Don't Go No Further") and was made available with or without an accompanying DVD that features the 5.1 surround sound version of the album along with Doors' rehearsal footage. This remix series has been criticized because "the band chose to remix and tinker with [the albums], adding and cutting from a few tracks and including unused instrumental parts." For example, "Cars Hiss By My Window" features an extra verse and other additions for a new length of 4:58 (as opposed to 4:10 on the original). In 2009, the album was reissued on 180g vinyl featuring the original mix, cut by Grundman.

In 2012, L.A. Woman was digitally remastered again as a part of "The Years of the Doors" series to commemorate its 40th Anniversary release. This edition was reissued in an expanded format on January 24, 2012 by Elektra and Rhino Records in CD and digital formats and it includes the 2006 stereo remix done and mastered by Botnick at Uniteye. It also features seven alternate versions of songs and two previously unreleased tracks, "She Smells So Nice" and "Rock Me". This remaster has been praised for leaving the original album "untouched". To accompany this release, a documentary titled Mr. Mojo Risin': The Story of L.A. Woman was distributed. The film includes interviews with all three remaining band members as well as live and studio performances. Analogue Productions also reissued the album on hybrid SACD (2013) and double 45 RPM vinyl (2012), both editions were mastered by Doug Sax and Sangwook Nam at The Mastering Lab; the CD layer of the Super Audio CD contains the original stereo mix while the SACD layer contains Botnick's 2006 5.1 surround mix. To commemorate the album’s 50th anniversary, Rhino released a three-CD/one-LP set on December 3, 2021. It was remastered by Botnick using the Plangent Process and includes the original stereo mix and two bonus discs of unreleased studio outtakes.

==== L.A. Woman Sessions special edition ====
Rhino released on April 23, 2022 (as a RSD exclusive) the studio outtakes from the 50th Anniversary three-CD/one-LP set as a special edition quadruple vinyl entitled L.A. Woman Sessions.

== Track listing ==
=== Original album ===
All songs written by the Doors, except where noted. Details are taken from the 1971 Elektra Records album and may differ from other sources.

Side one
No.	Title	Length
1.	"The Changeling"	4:20
2.	"Love Her Madly"	3:18
3.	"Been Down So Long"	4:40
4.	"Cars Hiss by My Window"	4:10
5.	"L.A. Woman"	7:49
Total length:		24:17

Side two
No.	Title	Writer(s)	Length
6.	"L'America"		4:35
7.	"Hyacinth House"		3:10
8.	"Crawling King Snake"	John Lee Hooker (Note: The 1971 Elektra Records LP did not indicate a songwriter;. the 2007 Rhino Records edition listed John Lee Hooker. Hooker claimed that he got the song from bluesman Tony Hollins.)	4:57
9.	"The WASP (Texas Radio and the Big Beat)"		4:14
10.	"Riders on the Storm"		7:12
Total length:			24:08 (48:25)

=== Reissues ===
2006 Remaster bonus tracks
No.	Title	Writer(s)	Length
11.	"Orange County Suite"		5:45
12.	"(You Need Meat) Don't Go No Further"	Willie Dixon	3:41

40th Anniversary edition bonus disc
No.	Title	Writer(s)	Length
1.	"The Changeling" (alternate version)		4:45
2.	"Love Her Madly" (alternate version)		3:59
3.	"Cars Hiss by My Window" (alternate version)		4:42
4.	"L.A. Woman" (alternate version)		8:50
5.	"The WASP (Texas Radio and the Big Beat)" (alternate version)		5:37
6.	"Been Down So Long" (alternate version)		5:06
7.	"Riders on the Storm" (alternate version)		9:07
8.	"She Smells So Nice" (previously unreleased)		3:26
9.	"Rock Me" (previously unreleased)	Muddy Waters	4:30

iTunes bonus tracks
No.	Title	Length
10.	"L.A. Woman" (take 1)	7:42
11.	"Crawling King Snake" (run-through and studio chatter)	4:35

Amazon bonus tracks
No.	Title	Length
10.	"Love Her Madly" (take 1)	3:38
11.	"The Changeling" (take 9)	5:28

Spotify bonus track
No.	Title	Length
10.	"The WASP (Texas Radio and the Big Beat)" (instrumental)	4:21

50th Anniversary First CD bonus tracks
No.	Title	Length
11.	"Hyacinth House" (demo)	2:35
12.	"Riders on the Storm" (Sunset Sound version)	4:33

50th Anniversary Second CD: L.A. Woman Sessions, Part 1
No.	Title	Length
1.	"The Changeling"	26:50
2.	"Love Her Madly"	21:10
3.	"Riders on the Storm"	18:09
4.	"L.A. Woman (Part 1)"	11:04

50th Anniversary Third CD: L.A. Woman Sessions, Part 2
No.	Title	Writer(s)	Length
1.	"L.A. Woman (Part 2)"		8:42
2.	"She Smells So Nice"		3:22
3.	"Rock Me Baby"	B.B. King	4:38
4.	"Mr. Mojo Risin'"		1:20
5.	"Baby, Please Don't Go"	Big Joe Williams	0:07
6.	"L.A. Woman (Part 3)"		13:42
7.	"Been Down So Long (Part 1)"		5:02
8.	"Get Out of My Life, Woman"	Allen Toussaint	3:56
9.	"Crawling King Snake"	John Lee Hooker	4:18
10.	"The Bastard Son Of Jimmy & Mama Reed (Cars Hiss By My Window)"		6:26
11.	"Been Down So Long (Part 2)"		23:00
12.	"Mystery Train"	Junior Parker	0:24
13.	"The WASP (Texas Radio and the Big Beat)"		1:26

=== L.A. Woman Sessions (2022 RSD special edition quadruple vinyl) ===
Side one
No.	Title	Length
1.	"The Changeling (Part 1)"	23:40

Side two
No.	Title	Length
1.	"The Changeling (Part 2)"	3:09
2.	"Love Her Madly (Part 1)"	15:48

Side three
No.	Title	Length
1.	"Love Her Madly (Part 2)"	5:09
2.	"Riders on the Storm"	18:09

Side four
No.	Title	Length
1.	"L.A. Woman (Part 1)"	19:45

Side five
No.	Title	Length
1.	"She Smells So Nice"	3:21
2.	"Rock Me Baby"	4:20
3.	"Mr. Mojo Risin'"	1:14
4.	"Baby Please Don't Go"	0:07
5.	"L.A. Woman (Part 2)"	13:25

Side six
No.	Title	Length
1.	"Been Down So Long (Part 1)"	4:58
2.	"Get Out of My Life Woman"	3:59
3.	"Crawling King Snake"	4:14
4.	"The Bastard Son Of Jimmy & Mama Reed (Cars Hiss By My Window)"	6:17
5.	"Mystery Train"	0:24
6.	"The WASP (Texas Radio and the Big Beat)"	1:26

Side seven
No.	Title	Length
1.	"Been Down So Long (Part 2)"	15:08

Side eight
No.	Title	Length
1.	"Been Down So Long (Part 3)"	7:52
2.	"Hyacinth House" (demo)	2:37
3.	"Riders on the Storm" (Sunset Sound version)	4:47

== Personnel ==
Details are taken from the 2007 Rhino Records CD remaster liner notes with producer Bruce Botnick's accompanying essay, and may differ from other sources.

The Doors

- Jim Morrison – vocals
- Robby Krieger – guitar
- Ray Manzarek – piano, (Note: including Rhodes piano on "L.A. Woman" and "Riders on the Storm") organ; (Note: including Hammond organ on "The Changeling", "Hyacinth House" and "The WASP (Texas Radio and the Big Beat)"; and Vox Continental on "Love Her Madly") rhythm guitar on "Been Down So Long"
- John Densmore – drums (with brushes on "Cars Hiss by My Window"), tambourine on "Love Her Madly" and "Been Down So Long"

Additional musicians

- Jerry Scheff – bass
- Marc Benno – rhythm guitar on "Been Down So Long", "Cars Hiss by My Window", "L.A. Woman" and "Crawling King Snake"

Technical

- Bruce Botnick – production
- The Doors – production
- Carl Cossick – album concept and design
- Wendell Hamick – cover photography

== Charts ==
Chart (1971)	Peak
Canada Top Albums/CDs (RPM)	11
Dutch Albums (Album Top 100)	1
Finnish Albums (Suomen Virallinen)	15
German Albums (Offizielle Top 100)	32
Norwegian Albums (VG-lista)	15
UK Albums (Official Charts)	28
US Billboard 200	9

Chart (2012)	Peak
Belgian Albums (Ultratop Flanders)	50
Dutch Albums (Album Top 100)	51
French Albums (SNEP)	89
Italian Albums (FIMI)	63
Spanish Albums (Promusicae)	57
Swiss Albums (Schweizer Hitparade)	69

Chart (2021)	Peak
Swiss Albums (Schweizer Hitparade)	52

Chart (2022)	Peak
Hungarian Albums (MAHASZ)	32

== Certifications ==
Region	Certification	Certified units/sales
Australia (ARIA)	4× Platinum	280,000^{^}
Austria (IFPI Austria)	Gold	25,000^{*}
Canada (Music Canada)	3× Platinum	300,000^{^}
France (SNEP)	2× Platinum	945,800 ^{*}
Germany (BVMI)	Gold	250,000^{^}
Italy (FIMI) sales since 2009	Gold	25,000^{‡}
Spain (Promusicae)	Platinum	100,000^{^}
Switzerland (IFPI Switzerland)	Gold	25,000^{^}
United Kingdom (BPI)	Gold	100,000^{^}
United Kingdom (BPI) 2007 release	Platinum	300,000^{‡}
United States (RIAA)	3× Platinum	3,000,000^{‡}
^{*} Sales figures based on certification alone.^{^} Shipments figures based on certification alone.^{‡} Sales+streaming figures based on certification alone.

== See also ==
- Outline of the Doors

== Bibliography ==
- Hopkins, Jerry; Sugerman, Danny (1980). No One Here Gets Out Alive. Grand Central. ISBN 978-0-446-60228-0.
