= Music Hall at Fair Park =

Performing arts theater in Dallas, Texas

Coordinates: 32°46′49″N 96°45′57″W

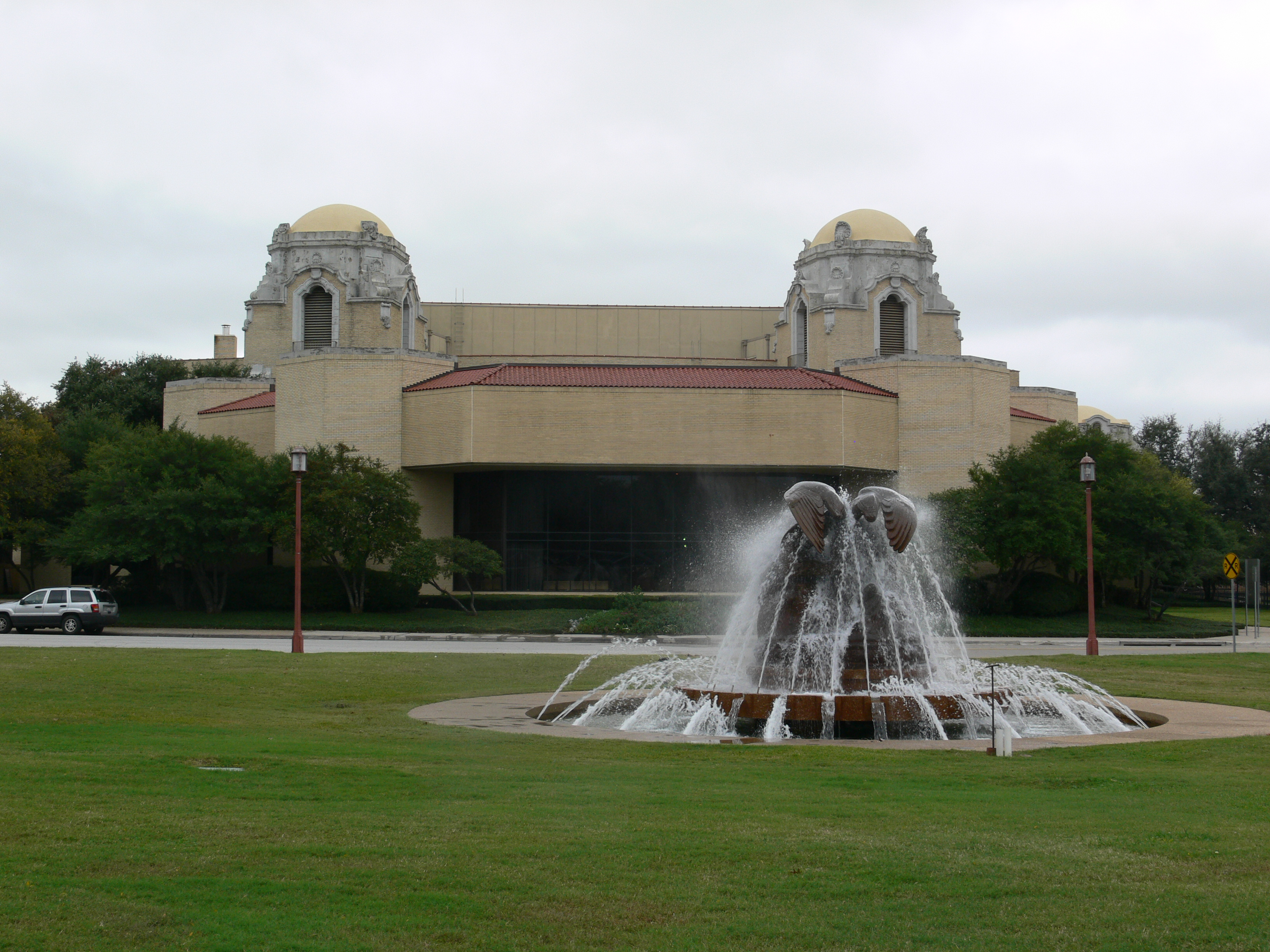
- Exterior of the venue (c.2009)
- Interactive map of Music Hall at Fair Park
- Former names: Fair Park Auditorium (1925-57)
- Address: 909 1st Ave; Dallas, TX 75210-1042
- Location: Fair Park
- Operator: Broadway Dallas
- Capacity: 3,420

Construction
- Opened: October 10, 1925
- Renovated: 1954; 1972; 1999
- Cost: $500,000 ($9.39 million in 2025 dollars)
- Architect: Lang & Witchell

Website
- Venue Website
- Fair Park Music Hall
- U.S. Historic district – Contributing property
- Texas State Antiquities Landmark
- Dallas Landmark Historic District; Contributing Property
- Architectural style: Spanish Colonial Revival
- Part of: Texas Centennial Exposition Buildings (1936-1937) (ID86003488)
- TSAL No.: 8200002125
- DLMKHD No.: H/33 (Fair Park)

Significant dates
- Designated CP: September 24, 1986
- Designated TSAL: January 1, 1984
- Designated DLMKHD: March 4, 1987

The Music Hall at Fair Park (originally the Fair Park Auditorium or State Fair Auditorium) is a performing arts theater in Dallas, Texas's Fair Park that opened in 1925.

The building features Spanish Baroque architecture with Moorish influences, including six stair towers topped with cast domes and arcade porches overlooking Fair Park. Air conditioning was installed in 1954, and in 1972, the Hall underwent a remodel that included an expanded lobby and restaurant. It was further refurbished and updated in 1999. Due to its spacious design, the Music Hall is widely recognized as a venue for Broadway musical touring companies and hosts various large-scale public and private events. The Music Hall is currently home to Broadway Dallas and was home to the Dallas Opera from 1957 to 2009.

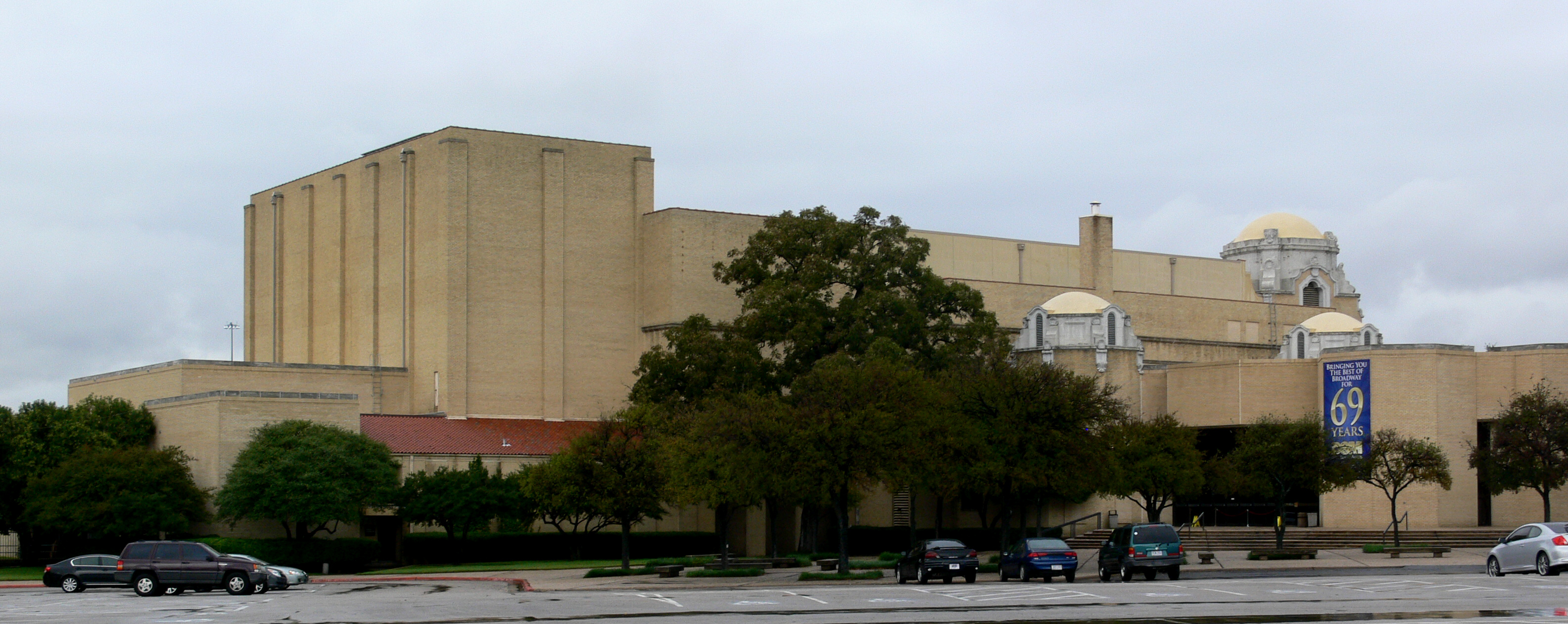
Music Hall at Fair Park

In July 2024, as part of 2024 Major League Baseball All-Star Game festivities, Jimmy Kimmel Live originated from the Music Hall.

== See also ==
- National Register of Historic Places listings in Dallas County, Texas
- List of Dallas Landmarks
