= Ship of Fools (The Doors song) =

Song by The Doors

from the album Morrison Hotel
- Released: February 9, 1970
- Recorded: 1969–1970
- Genre: Rock
- Length: 3:06
- Label: Elektra
- Songwriters: Jim Morrison; Robby Krieger
- Producer: Paul A. Rothchild

"Ship of Fools" is a song written by Jim Morrison and Robby Krieger that was first released on the Doors' 1970 album Morrison Hotel. Live versions also appeared on several of the Doors' live albums.

== Writing and recording ==
Krieger described writing the song as follows:

There was a guitar line that I came up with, which I kind of stole from an old blues song that I heard when I was in high school. And Jim, I can't remember whether he just came up with the words right then or if it was a poem he had already done in high school.

Krieger also felt that Morrison was an influenced by the fact that his father was a sailor.

The song was recorded by the Doors' lineup of Morrison on lead vocals, Krieger on guitar, Ray Manzarek on keyboards and John Densmore on drums, supplemented by Ray Neapolitan on bass guitar.

== Lyrics and music ==
Allmusic critic Lindsay Planer described "Ship of Fools" as "a poetic musical paradox" with "buoyant syncopated rhythms" whose lyrics occupy "the familiar terrain between creation and demise." Music critic Patricia Kennely described it as "ecology rock". Pop culture writer Tony Thompson also regarded the ecology as one of the songs themes, as well as the "consciousness of the planet" that emanated from the Apollo 11 moon landing. Far Out critic Jordan Potter described it as being about "the battle against capitalism and environmental dominion." Doors' biographer Doug Sundling called it a song that "concisely describes the American trip."

The first verse has an apocalyptic tone, opening with the lines "The human race was dying out/No one left to scream or shout." The verse also optimistically references the 1969 Apollo 11 moon landing before returning to a pessimistic line that "smog will get you pretty soon."

The second verse references the counterculture of the 1960s and ends with the line "Hope our little world will last." The third verse ends with a Mr. Goodtrips "looking for a new ship", and the singer telling the people to get on board. Mr. Goodtrips has been speculated to be variously Jim Morrison's father, Neil Armstrong, Jerry Garcia or a drug dealer.

The music opens with what Planer describes as a "tight, jazzy percolating riff" before shifting to a 2/4 beat for the start of the vocals. Thompson felt that the opening riff is similar to that of Ray Charles' "What'd I Say". There is also a musical interlude between the second and third verses. Thompson commented on the "interesting, almost Prog-like interplay" between Manzarek, Krieger an Neapolitan throughout the song. Allmusic critic Thom Jurek said that the song "contains shifting time signatures that cross jazz, R&B, and pop."

The title of the song came from Katherine Anne Porter's 1962 novel Ship of Fools, which was a book about a sea voyage that serves as "a metaphor for the rise of fascism."

== Reception ==
Classic Rock critic Mick Wall felt "Ship of Fools" was one of the lesser songs on Morrison Hotel, stating that it was "yet another variant on the riff to 'Break On Through (To the Other Side)', which could, equally, have turned up on either of the first two Doors albums. Cleveland Press critic Bruno Bornino considered it his favorite song from side 1 of Morrison Hotel due to the fact that "Morrison goes through a lot of changes". Wichita Beacon critic Little John considered it to be a basic song but with "some nice lyrics" and one of the few songs on Morrison Hotel that retains Morrison's mystique from earlier Doors albums.

"Ship of Fools" was included on the Doors' 1972 compilation album Weird Scenes Inside the Gold Mine.

== Live versions ==
"Ship of Fools" was often played live at Doors' concerts during the 1970s. In live performances, the instrumental interlude between the second and third verses was often extended jazzy improvisations. Live concert renditions appear on several Doors albums, including The Doors: Box Set, Live in Detroit, Live in New York, Live in Philadelphia '70, Live in Boston and Live at the Isle of Wight Festival 1970.
