= The Changeling (song) =

Single by the Doors

from the album L.A. Woman
- A-side: "Riders on the Storm"
- Released: April 1971 (album); June 1971 (single)
- Recorded: December 1970
- Studio: The Doors' Workshop, Los Angeles, California
- Genre: Blues rock; funk rock
- Length: 3:27 (single version); 4:20 (album version)
- Label: Elektra
- Songwriter: The Doors
- Producers: Bruce Botnick; The Doors

The Doors singles chronology
"Love Her Madly" (1971)	"The Changeling" (1971)	"Tightrope Ride" (1971)

"The Changeling" is a song by the American rock band the Doors. It appears as the opening track on their sixth album and final with Jim Morrison, L.A. Woman. Released in April 1971 as the B-side of "Riders on the Storm", the single peaked at number 14 on the Billboard Hot 100 chart.

== Background ==
"The Changeling" was the first song that the band recorded during the sessions for L.A. Woman. The song's title was taken from one of Morrison's 1968 notebooks, and refers to the "changeling", a legendary human-like creature found in folklore throughout Europe. Writer James Riordan has noted that the song's mention of changeling, or spirit child, may be another reference to Morrison's difficult childhood. The funky James Brown-esque composition also appears to anticipate the singer's departure from Los Angeles with the line "I'm leavin' town on the midnight train". Doors' keyboardist Ray Manzarek explained:

The lyrics are prophetic. "I've lived uptown. I've lived downtown, but I've never been so broke that I couldn't leave town." He'd lived on the beach and in the hills. He'd had money and been broke. He'd had his L.A. adventure, and he was out.

Musically, "The Changeling" blends blues rock and funk music elements. The song is notated in the key of A minor. During the recording session, Morrison remarked "I hate to spook anybody, but this is my favorite number. Play your ass off, boy."

== Release and reception ==
"The Changeling" was first released in April 1971, sequenced as the opening track on the A-side of L.A. Woman. The band wanted the song to be the album's first single, but Elektra Records president Jac Holzman overruled the group's decision in favor of "Love Her Madly" and the non-album B-side "(You Need Meat) Don't Go No Further". However, later in June 1971 it was issued as the B-side of "Riders on the Storm", edited to 3:27. The track was also performed live by the Doors at State Fair Music Hall in Dallas on December 11, 1970. This live version appears on the 2003 album Boot Yer Butt: The Doors Bootlegs.

On November 25, 1990, when disc jockey Bruce Van Dyke played the song on his radio station one day, a man called in saying, "Why doesn't anyone play this?" Upon its release, "The Changeling" has received comments in several album reviews of L.A. Woman. Writing for AllMusic, critic Richie Unterberger described the song as one of "their better little-heeded album tracks". Will Hermes of Rolling Stone called it a "garage-style classic". Holzman acknowledged it as a "tribute to James Brown", while Sal Cinquemani of Slant Magazine labeled it a "James Brown funk swagger".

Rolling Stone critic Narendra Kusnur considered it one of Morrison's 10 most underrated songs, particularly praising Manzarek's Hammond organ playing and Morrison's vocal performance. The Guardian cited it as the 16th best Doors track, describing it "a James Brown-reminiscent funk-rock strut heavy on groove and grit."

== Personnel ==
The Doors

- Jim Morrison – vocals
- Ray Manzarek – Hammond C-3 organ
- Robby Krieger – slide guitar
- John Densmore – drums

Additional musicians

- Jerry Scheff – bass guitar
