= Tony Hollins =

American singer-songwriter (1909–1957)

Tony Hollins (June 25, 1909 – January 1957) was an American blues singer, guitarist and songwriter.

== Biography ==
Hollins is thought to have been born in Oktibbeha County, Mississippi, and was raised at Lucky's Plantation. In the 1920s, he dated John Lee Hooker's sister Alice. On visits, he impressed Hooker with his skill on the guitar, helped teach him to play, and gave Hooker his first guitar. For the rest of his life, Hooker regarded Hollins as a formative influence on his style of playing and his career as a musician. Among the songs that Hollins reputedly taught Hooker were versions of "Crawlin' King Snake" and "Catfish Blues".

Hollins primarily worked as a barber in Clarksdale, Mississippi. He made his first recordings for OKeh Records in Chicago in 1941, including "Crosscut Saw Blues", "Crawlin' King Snake" and "Traveling Man Blues", both songs later performed by Hooker, in the latter case renamed as "When My Wife Quit Me". Hollins failed to maintain a career as a musician and returned to Clarksdale. However, he went back to Chicago in the late 1940s, and recorded for Decca with Sunnyland Slim in 1951.

He is believed to have died in Clarksdale early in 1957, although one source places his death in Chicago in 1959.
