= Hyacinth House =

1971 song by the Doors

Song by the Doors

from the album L.A. Woman
- Released: April 1971
- Recorded: December 1970 – January 1971
- Studio: The Doors Workshop, Los Angeles
- Genre: Rock
- Length: 3:10
- Label: Elektra
- Songwriter(s): The Doors
- Producer(s): The Doors; Bruce Botnick

"Hyacinth House" is a song written and performed by the Doors. It appears on the band's final album with frontman Jim Morrison, L.A. Woman (1971). Its lyrics were written by Morrison, while the music was composed by keyboardist Ray Manzarek.

== Composition and recording ==
Contrary to all the other album tracks which were recorded on a professional-quality 8-channel tape recorder, "Hyacinth House" was recorded on a 4-track machine. Morrison recorded his vocals in the studio's bathroom for the isolation it provided and for the reverberation of the tiled walls.

Polonaise No.6 in A-flat Major, Op. 53
The organ solo borrowed from one of Frédéric Chopin's piano compositions.

As with the other songs on L.A. Woman, the album liner notes list the track's songwriters as the Doors; but the performance rights organization ASCAP shows the writers as the individual Doors members. However, the music has also been attributed to keyboardist Ray Manzarek, which references Frédéric Chopin's Polonaise in A-flat major, Op. 53 during the organ solo, and the lyrics to Morrison, written while Morrison was at guitarist Robby Krieger's beach house.

=== Lyrics ===
"Hyacinth House" contains analogies to the upheaval in Morrison's personal life and relationships. The line "someone who doesn’t need me", refers to his troubles with girlfriend Pamela Courson. According to Krieger, the line heard in the song's bridge: "I see the bathroom is clear" is a reference to an occurrence when Morrison's friend Babe Hill left the studio's bathroom so Morrison could use it to record his vocals. Krieger has also said that the line "To please the lions" was inspired after Morrison was in Krieger's house and saw a baby bobcat that Krieger was keeping as a pet. Doors' drummer John Densmore said about Morrison's interpretation and lyrics, "He was re-examining, but not with regret. Toward the end, Jim said, 'Probably next time, I'd be a little solitary, Zen gardener working in his garden.' I don't interpret that as a regret, but he had a hunch."

== Reception ==
In a PopMatters review of the 40th Anniversary edition of L.A. Woman, Nathan Wisnicki commented that Jim Morrison's delivery in "Hyacinth House" is "a bit lethargic and flaccid", also describing some of the song's lyrics as "laughable". The Doors FAQ author Richie Weidman declared "Hyacinth House" as "one of the strangest Doors' songs ever recorded".

Critic Ryan Leas of Stereogum, who ranked L.A. Woman the second best Doors album, praised "Hyacinth House" as "secretly one of the Doors' finest songs" and that it "still fits into the universe of L.A. Woman". Densmore acknowledged the song as one of Jim Morrison's "saddest songs".

Indian Rolling Stone critic Narendra Kusnur considered it one of Morrison's 10 most underrated songs, saying that lines such as "'I need a brand new friend who doesn't bother me, I need a brand new friend who doesn't trouble me, I need someone, yeah who doesn't need me' were charged with emotion, and were an example of Morrison's intense side".

== Personnel ==
Per 2007 reissue of L.A. Woman CD booklet:

The Doors

- Jim Morrison – vocals
- Ray Manzarek – Hammond organ
- Robby Krieger – guitar
- John Densmore – drums

Additional musicians

- Jerry Scheff – bass guitar
