= Crawling King Snake =

Song popularized by John Lee Hooker

Single by Big Joe Williams
- B-side: "Meet Me Around the Corner"
- Released: 1941
- Recorded: Chicago, March 27, 1941
- Genre: Blues
- Length: 2:51
- Label: Bluebird
- Songwriter: Unknown

"Crawling King Snake" (alternatively "Crawlin' King Snake" or "Crawling/Crawlin' Kingsnake") is a blues song that has been recorded by numerous blues and other artists. It is believed to have originated as a Delta blues in the 1920s and be related to earlier songs, such as "Black Snake Blues" by Victoria Spivey and "Black Snake Moan" by Blind Lemon Jefferson.

As "Crawling King Snake", it was first recorded by Big Joe Williams on March 27, 1941. The song is a country-style blues, with Williams on vocal and nine-string guitar and William Mitchell providing imitation bass accompaniment. On June 3, 1941, Delta bluesman Tony Hollins recorded "a markedly different version", which served as the basis for many subsequent versions.

== John Lee Hooker versions ==
John Lee Hooker began performing "Crawling King Snake" early in his career and included it in his sets after arriving in Detroit, Michigan in the early 1940s. In an interview, Hooker explained that he adapted Tony Hollins' song: "I got that 'Crawling King Snake' from him [Hollins]". Hooker first recorded the song in Detroit on February 18, 1949 for producer Bernard Besman. When it was released by Los Angeles-based Modern Records, "Crawling King Snake" became one of Hooker's most successful singles, reaching number six on the Billboard R&B chart in 1949. Hooker recorded several subsequent versions of the song, including one with Rolling Stones guitarist Keith Richards for Hooker's 1991 album Mr. Lucky.

== Other recordings ==
"Crawling King Snake" has been recorded by numerous musicians and the song "became a concert staple for dozens of blues-rock bands". In 1971, the Doors recorded a rock adaptation of "Crawling King Snake". Band drummer John Densmore recalled that the group often listened to the song during their early years; vocalist Jim Morrison suggested they record it, which the Doors eventually did for their sixth album, L.A. Woman. For the recording, additional instrumentation was provided by Jerry Scheff on bass and Marc Benno on rhythm guitar.

Eric Burdon released a cover on his 1982 album Comeback. The album originally features a 2-minute version. On his 1995 album Rare Masters the full 10-minute version was finally released.

In April 2021, a version by the Black Keys was released as a single ahead of the release of their tenth studio album Delta Kream. The group's singer and guitarist Dan Auerbach came upon it by way of a recording by Junior Kimbrough. He explained:

This is basically folk music on a certain level, and a lot of this music is like hand-me-downs from generation to generation ... I’m singing lyrics that are like third-generation wrong lyrics. I’m singing a certain version that Junior recorded where maybe he messed up a line, but that’s the only one I know. So we were really just kind of flying by the seat of our pants.
