= Been Down So Long =

1971 single by the Doors

Song by the Doors

from the album L.A. Woman
- Released: April 19, 1971
- Recorded: December 1970 – January 1971
- Studio: The Doors Workshop, Los Angeles
- Genre: Blues
- Length: 4:40
- Label: Elektra
- Songwriter(s): The Doors
- Producer(s): The Doors; Bruce Botnick

"Been Down So Long" is a song by the American rock band the Doors. It appears on L.A. Woman, the last studio album that lead singer Jim Morrison recorded with the group. It has been called, notably by critic Robert Christgau, as a "take-off" on the album.

A live version recorded on May 8, 1970, at Cobo Arena in Detroit, appears on the 2000 compilation album The Bright Midnight Sampler.

== Lyrics ==
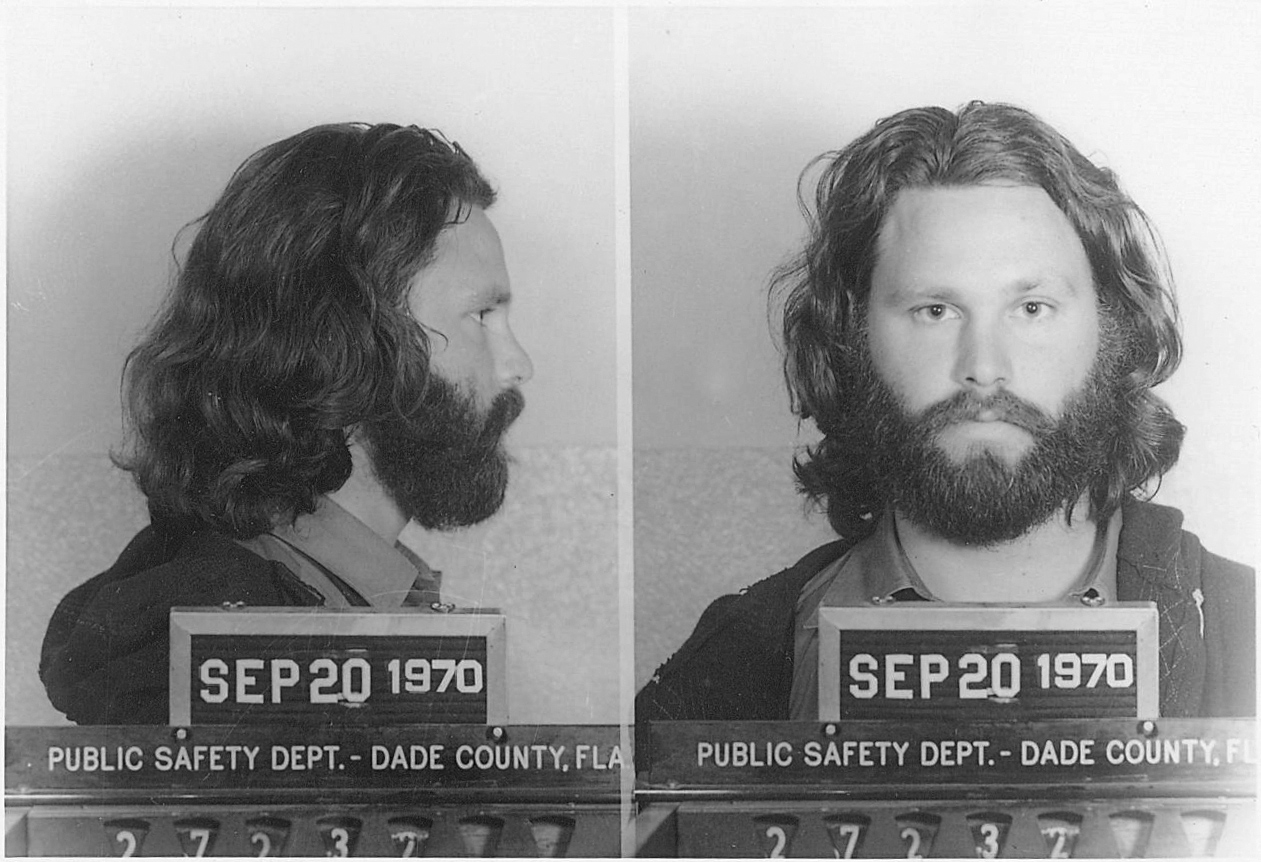
Morrison's lyrics refer to his occasional imprisonments, including his conviction in Miami, and his "affect of the American justice system".

The song's lyrics were written by lead singer and frontman Jim Morrison, though the performance rights organization ASCAP, along with the actual album liner notes, has given the songwriting credit to all members of the group evenly.

[Morrison] took the title of a Richard Farina novel. It's another retrospectively prophetic song. He was tired and worn out. He needed to be in a quieter, calmer place.

– Ray Manzarek, assaying the song's lyrics

Morrison's lyrics draws upon themes of depression, liberation, and sexuality, referring to his imprisonments during live performances. The title makes reference to Richard Fariña's book Been Down So Long It Looks Like Up to Me, and was influenced by the lyrics of Furry Lewis's 1928 song, "I Will Turn Your Money Green": "I been down so long/It seem like up to me." It is also considered to be Morrison at his most "mock tough", and his disapproval of the judicial system in the US.

== Music and contributions ==
Session musician Jerry Scheff contributed on bass guitar, while the rhythm guitars were played by Marc Benno and keyboardist Ray Manzarek. Musically, "Been Down So Long" is a conventional blues song, with rambunctious aggression, and having the "old Doors, slow blues" style. It features a distinct slide guitar by Robby Krieger, a rough sound, and a stomping beat. In response to Morrison's bluesy interpretation in an interview with L.A. Weekly, Elektra Records president Jac Holzman said about Morrison's general enthusiasm for the blues during that time:

Jim always thought he was the world's best blues singer. He'd see somebody up on the stage and say, "You can't sing the blues worth shit," and nearly get into a fight with them. He was generally drunk by then. Jim had a preponderance of wonderful qualities, a great gentleness.

== Critical response ==
In his music reference book Rock Albums of the '70s: A Critical Guide, published in 1981, Robert Christgau considered L.A. Woman to be the Doors' greatest effort; however he also deemed "Been Down So Long" along with "L'America" as one of the few "disappointing" tracks of the album. Will Hermes of Rolling Stone rating L.A. Woman with four-and-a-half stars out five, he characterized the song as a "garage-style classic". PopMatters critic Nathan Wisnicki wrote in his review that with "Been Down So Long" the Doors "overestimated their jamming abilities", adding that the song "could've been tightened-up without losing any fire". Music journalist James Perone declared it one of the "must-hear blues songs" of the band.

== Personnel ==
The Doors

- Jim Morrison – vocals
- Ray Manzarek – rhythm guitar
- Robby Krieger – slide guitar
- John Densmore – drums, tambourine

Additional musicians

- Jerry Scheff – bass guitar
- Marc Benno – rhythm guitar

== Sources ==
- Bowling, David (2013). Eric Clapton FAQ: All That's Left to Know About Slowhand. Montclair, NJ: Backbeat Books. ISBN 978-1617134548.
- Christgau, Robert (1981). "A Critical Guide: D". Rock Albums of the '70s. Da Capo Paperback. ISBN 978-0306804090.
- Tobler, John; Doe, Andrew (1984). The Doors. ISBN 978-0862760694.
- Fowlie, Wallace (1993). Rimbaud and Jim Morrison: The Rebel as Poet. ISBN 0822314452.
- Gerstenmeyer, Heinz (2001). The Doors – Sounds for Your Soul – Die Musik Der Doors (in German). ISBN 978-3-8311-2057-4.
- Kitts, Jeff; Tolinski, Brad (2002). Guitar World Presents One Hundred Greatest Guitarists of All Time. ISBN 978-0634046193.
- Perone, James (2019). "Blues Rock". Listen to the Blues! Exploring a Musical Genre. ABC-CLIO. ISBN 978-1440866142.
- Perone, James (2012). The Album: A Guide to Pop Music's Most Provocative, Influential, and Important Creations. Praeger. ISBN 978-0-3133-7906-2.
- Pichaske, David R. (1969). The Poetry of Rock: The Golden Years.
- Riordan, James (1991). Break on Through: The Life and Death of Jim Morrison. First Harper. ISBN 978-0688119157.
- Weidman, Richie (2011). The Doors FAQ: All That's Left to Know About the Kings of Acid Rock. Backbeat Books. ISBN 978-1-61713-017-5.
- The Doors (2011). "Mr. Mojo Risin': The Story of L.A. Woman". Classic Albums. Eagle Rock Entertainment.
