= Love Her Madly =

- German single cover

Single by the Doors

from the album L.A. Woman
- B-side: "(You Need Meat) Don't Go No Further"
- Released: March 1971
- Recorded: December 1970 – January 1971
- Studio: The Doors' Workshop, Los Angeles
- Genre: Blues rock
- Length: 3:20 (album version); 2:45 (single version)
- Label: Elektra
- Songwriter: The Doors (Note: Although the album liner notes list the songwriters as each of the individual Doors members, guitarist Robby Krieger has been identified as the song's songwriter. Lindsay Planer of AllMusic suggests Morrison was responsible for the lyrics ("Morrison’s poetic imagery holds up").)
- Producers: Bruce Botnick; The Doors

The Doors singles chronology
"You Make Me Real" (1970)	"Love Her Madly" (1971)	"Riders on the Storm" (1971)

Audio
- "Love Her Madly" on YouTube

"Love Her Madly" is a song by American rock band the Doors. It was released in March 1971 and was the first single from L.A. Woman, their final album with singer Jim Morrison. "Love Her Madly" became one of the highest-charting hits for the Doors; it peaked at number 11 on the Billboard Hot 100 singles chart and reached number three in Canada. Session musician Jerry Scheff played bass guitar on the song.

Cash Box described the song as being "a precision combination of FM and top forty potentials." Record World called it a "terrific new rocker."

In 2000, Robby Krieger, Ray Manzarek and drummer John Densmore recorded a new version of "Love Her Madly" with Bo Diddley for the Doors tribute album Stoned Immaculate.

== Background ==
Band guitarist Robby Krieger wrote "Love Her Madly" during the period of Jim Morrison's trial in September 1970. He composed the music while experimenting on a 12-string guitar, and he was inspired to write the lyrics from his troubles and fights with his then-girlfriend and later-wife Lynn. Ray Manzarek has said that the song's title was taken from Duke Ellington's line "We love you madly", a catchphrase which he used to utter to the audience at the end of his concerts.

According to longtime Doors producer Paul A. Rothchild, "Love Her Madly" was the song that instigated his departure from the original L.A. Woman sessions, with Rothchild dismissing the song as "cocktail music." Conversely, Krieger has claimed that "Riders on the Storm" was the song to which Rothchild was referring. Following Rothchild's departure from the project, the Doors opted to self-produce the album, in association with longtime engineer Bruce Botnick.

The B-side of the single, "You Need Meat (Don't Go No Further)," is the only studio recording released by the Doors during Jim Morrison's tenure with the group to feature a lead vocal by keyboardist Ray Manzarek. It is also one of only three non-album B-sides by the Doors, the other two being "Who Scared You?" (B-side of "Wishful Sinful") and the relatively rare post-Morrison track "Treetrunk" (B-side of "Get Up and Dance"). "(You Need Meat) Don't Go No Further" met its first official album release on the Weird Scenes Inside the Gold Mine compilation, and was subsequently included in the 2006 Perception box and as a bonus track on the 2007 reissue of L.A. Woman.

== Personnel ==
The Doors

- Jim Morrison – vocals
- Robby Krieger – electric and acoustic guitar
- Ray Manzarek – Vox Continental organ, tack piano
- John Densmore – drums, tambourine

Additional musicians

- Jerry Scheff – bass

== Chart history ==
Chart (1971)	Peak position
Australian Go-Set National Top 60	6
Netherlands	4
Canada RPM Top 100 Singles	3
US Billboard Hot 100	11
US Adult Contemporary (Billboard)	29
U.S. Cashbox Top 100 Singles	7

== Certifications ==
Region	Certification	Certified units/sales
United States (RIAA)	Platinum	1,000,000^{‡}
^{‡} Sales+streaming figures based on certification alone.
