= Riders on the Storm =

1971 single by the Doors

Single by the Doors

from the album L.A. Woman
- B-side: "The Changeling"
- Released: June 1971
- Recorded: December 1970 – January 1971
- Genre: Psychedelic rock; jazz rock; art rock
- Length: 7:14 (album version); 4:35 (single version); 7:43 (Apple Music version)
- Label: Elektra
- Songwriters: John Densmore; Robby Krieger; Ray Manzarek; Jim Morrison
- Producers: Bruce Botnick; The Doors

The Doors singles chronology
"Love Her Madly" (1971)	"Riders on the Storm" (1971)	"Tightrope Ride" (1971)

"Riders on the Storm" is a song by American rock band the Doors, released in June 1971 by Elektra Records as the second single from the band's sixth studio album, L.A. Woman. It is known for being the last song that Jim Morrison recorded prior to his sudden death in Paris on July 3, 1971.

It reached number 14 on the U.S. Billboard Hot 100, number 22 on the UK Singles Chart, and number seven in the Netherlands.

== Background and composition ==
"Riders on the Storm" has been classified as a psychedelic rock, jazz rock, art rock song, and a precursor of gothic music. According to guitarist Robby Krieger and keyboardist Ray Manzarek, it was inspired by the country song "(Ghost) Riders in the Sky: A Cowboy Legend", written by Stan Jones and popularized by Vaughn Monroe.

The lyrics were written and brought to rehearsal by Morrison, of which a portion of it refers to hitchhiking killer Billy "Cockeyed" Cook, who was the subject of the 1953 film, The Hitch-Hiker. Manzarek noted that some lines express Morrison's love to his companion Pamela Courson.

The track is notated in the key of E Minor; the main keyboard riff descends throughout the pitches of Dorian Mode scale, and features a progression of i–IV–i^{7}–IV.

=== Heidegger's influence ===
Speaking with Krieger and Manzarek, the German philosopher Thomas Collmer argued that the line "Into this world we're thrown" recalls philosopher Martin Heidegger's concept of "thrownness"—human existence as a basic state. In 1963, at Florida State University in Tallahassee, Morrison heard an influential lecture for him, which discussed philosophers who dealt critically with the philosophical tradition, including Friedrich Nietzsche and Heidegger. In 2009, Simon Critchley dedicated his column in The Guardian to Heidegger's thrownness, and explained it using the verse of the song. The connection between the thrownness into the world and a dog's life was anticipated by the anti-Heideggerian author Ernst Bloch in his main work The Principle of Hope (1954–1959).

== Production ==
It is popularly believed that "Riders on the Storm" is the song that longtime Doors producer Paul A. Rothchild disparaged as "cocktail music", precipitating his departure from the L.A. Woman sessions, which was corroborated by guitarist Robby Krieger. Rothchild denied the claim, stating that he said it of "Love Her Madly". Following Rothchild's departure, their engineer Bruce Botnick was selected to take over production duties, alongside the Doors.

== Recording ==
The "Sunset Sound" demo version has Manzarek playing piano bass.

The studio version was recorded at the Doors Workshop in December 1970 with the assistance of Botnick, and with Scheff on electric bass.

Later in January 1971, after Morrison had recorded his main vocals, the group gathered at Poppi Studios to complete the mixing of L.A. Woman, at which Morrison then whispered the lyrics over them to create an echo effect. It was the last song recorded by all four members of the Doors, as well as the last song recorded by Morrison to be released in his lifetime.

== Personnel ==
Personnel taken from the album's liner notes, except where noted.

The Doors

- Jim Morrison – vocals
- Ray Manzarek – Rhodes piano
- Robby Krieger – electric guitar with tremolo
- John Densmore – drums

Additional musicians

- Jerry Scheff – bass guitar

== Single release ==
The single was released in June 1971, entering the Billboard Hot 100 the week ending July 3, 1971, the same week Morrison died.

== Charts and certifications ==
=== Weekly charts ===
Chart (1971)	Peak position
Canada Top Singles (RPM)	5
Ireland (IRMA)	12
Netherlands (Single Top 100)	7
Netherlands (Dutch Top 40)	7
New Zealand (Listener)	20
UK Singles Chart	22
US Billboard Hot 100	14
US Billboard Easy Listening	11
US Cashbox Top 100 Singles	12
West Germany (GfK)	28

Chart (1976)	Peak position
UK Singles Chart	33

Chart (1991)	Peak position
Finland (Suomen Virallinen)	24
UK Singles Chart	68
Ireland (IRMA)	12

=== Year-end charts ===
Chart (1971)	Rank
Canada	68
US Billboard Hot 100	99
US Cash Box	100

=== Certifications ===
Region	Certification	Certified units/sales
Italy (FIMI) sales since 2009	Gold	35,000^{‡}
New Zealand (RMNZ)	Platinum	30,000^{‡}
Spain (Promusicae)	Gold	30,000^{‡}
United Kingdom (BPI) sales since 2004	Gold	400,000^{‡}
United States (RIAA)	2× Platinum	2,000,000^{‡}
^{‡} Sales+streaming figures based on certification alone.

== Legacy ==
I was in San Francisco with a friend at Christmas and we were coming down off some blue window pane acid. It was late at night and we were listening to a night time radio station and this came on. Throughout the song there is the whispering of the title tracking the lead vocal and that whisper was so loud. It was in my ear, in my head. I was brain-washed. I just love the real sound effects, too, the rain and the storm. You can just drift off into your own film scenario.

— Siouxsie Sioux

Frequently listed among the Doors' greatest songs, "Riders on the Storm" has remained on classic rock radio playlists. In 2012, New York's Q104.3 ranked it the 498th best classic-rock song of all time.

Doors' drummer, John Densmore, released a book in 1990 entitled Riders on the Storm, detailing the story of his life and his time with the group. In 2010, the song was inducted into the Grammy Hall of Fame as a recording "of lasting qualitative or historical significance". Its lyrical content has inspired films such as The Hitcher (1986) and Point Break (1991). A remix of "Riders on the Storm" by Fredwreck featuring Snoop Dogg was used as title music for Need for Speed: Underground 2, released in 2004.

== Annabel Lamb version ==
"Riders on the Storm"

Single by Annabel Lamb

from the album Once Bitten
- B-side: "No Cure"
- Released: August 25, 1983
- Recorded: 1982
- Genre: New wave
- Length: 3:58
- Label: A&M
- Songwriters: John Densmore; Robby Krieger; Ray Manzarek; Jim Morrison
- Producers: David Anderle; Wally Brill

Annabel Lamb singles chronology
"Heartland" (1983)	"Riders on the Storm" (1983)	"The Flame" (1984)

In 1983, Annabel Lamb recorded a studio version of the song. It was released as a single from her debut album, Once Bitten, which peaked at number 27 on the UK Singles Chart. She performed the song later that year on Top of the Pops. This was the only hit single in UK in her career.

=== Charts ===
Chart (1983)	Peak position
Australia (Kent Music Report)	98
Ireland (IRMA)	16
UK Singles Chart	27
Swedish Singles Chart	18
