= List of airports in Virginia =

This is a list of airports in Virginia (a U.S. state), grouped by type and sorted by location. It contains all public-use and military airports in the state. Some private-use and former airports may be included where notable, such as airports that were previously public-use, those with commercial enplanements recorded by the FAA or airports assigned an IATA airport code.

The list includes two airports which serve the Washington, D.C. metropolitan area, but are actually located in Virginia: Ronald Reagan Washington National Airport and Dulles International Airport. Both airports are operated by the Metropolitan Washington Airports Authority.

== Airports ==
This list contains the following information:

- **City served** – The city generally associated with the airport, as per the airport's master record with the Federal Aviation Administration. This is not always the actual location since some airports are located in smaller towns outside of the city they serve. It is not meant to be a complete list of cities served, which can be found in or added to each airport's Wikipedia article.
- **FAA** – The location identifier assigned by the Federal Aviation Administration (FAA).
- **IATA** – The airport code assigned by the International Air Transport Association (IATA). Those that do not match the FAA code are shown in bold.
- **ICAO** – The location indicator assigned by the International Civil Aviation Organization (ICAO).
- **Airport name** – The official airport name. Those shown in **bold** indicate the airport has scheduled passenger service on commercial airlines.
- **Role** – One of four FAA airport categories, as per the 2021–2025 National Plan of Integrated Airport Systems (NPIAS) report released September 2020:
  - P-s: Commercial service – primary are publicly owned airports that receive scheduled passenger service and have more than 10,000 passenger boardings (enplanements) each year. Each primary airport is sub-classified by the FAA as one of the following four "hub" types (s):
    - L: Large hub that accounts for at least 1% of total U.S. passenger enplanements.
    - M: Medium hub that accounts for between 0.25% and 1% of total U.S. passenger enplanements.
    - S: Small hub that accounts for between 0.05% and 0.25% of total U.S. passenger enplanements.
    - N: Nonhub that accounts for less than 0.05% of total U.S. passenger enplanements, but more than 10,000 annual enplanements.
  - CS: Commercial service – nonprimary are publicly owned airports that receive scheduled passenger service and have at least 2,500 passenger boardings each year.
  - R: Reliever airports are designated by the FAA to relieve congestion at a large commercial service airport and to provide more general aviation access to the overall community.
  - GA: General aviation airports are the largest single group of airports in the U.S. airport system. They are public-use airports that do not have scheduled service or have scheduled service with less than 2,500 passenger boardings each year.
- **Enplanements** – The number of enplanements (commercial passenger boardings) that occurred at the airport in calendar year 2024, as per FAA records released October 2025.

City served	FAA	IATA	ICAO	Airport name	Role	Enplanements (2024)
				**Commercial service – primary airports**		
Charlottesville	CHO	CHO	KCHO	**Charlottesville–Albemarle Airport**	P-N	351,138
Highland Springs	RIC	RIC	KRIC	**Richmond International Airport** (Byrd Field)	P-S	2,456,422
Newport News	PHF	PHF	KPHF	**Newport News/Williamsburg International Airport** (Patrick Henry Field)	P-N	68,787
Norfolk	ORF	ORF	KORF	**Norfolk International Airport**	P-S	2,444,897
Roanoke	ROA	ROA	KROA	**Roanoke–Blacksburg Regional Airport** (Woodrum Field)	P-N	382,103
Staunton / Waynesboro / Harrisonburg	SHD	SHD	KSHD	**Shenandoah Valley Regional Airport**	P-N	8,762
Timberlake	LYH	LYH	KLYH	**Lynchburg Regional Airport** (Preston Glenn Field)	P-N	81,477
Washington, D.C. / Arlington	DCA	DCA	KDCA	**Ronald Reagan Washington National Airport**	P-L	12,750,892
Washington, D.C. / Dulles / Chantilly	IAD	IAD	KIAD	**Dulles International Airport**	P-L	13,003,234
				**Reliever airports**		
Leesburg	JYO	JYO	KJYO	Leesburg Executive Airport	R	139
Washington, D.C. / Manassas	HEF	**MNZ**	KHEF	Manassas Regional Airport (Harry P. Davis Field)	R	187
Norfolk / Chesapeake	PVG		KPVG	Hampton Roads Executive Airport	R	0
Richmond	FCI		KFCI	Chesterfield County Airport (Richmond Executive Airport)	R	84
Stafford	RMN		KRMN	Stafford Regional Airport	R	24
Warrenton	HWY		KHWY	Warrenton-Fauquier Airport	R	3
				**General aviation airports**		
Abingdon	VJI	VJI	KVJI	Virginia Highlands Airport	GA	43
Blacksburg	BCB	BCB	KBCB	Virginia Tech/Montgomery Executive Airport	GA	2
Brookneal	0V4			Brookneal/Campbell County Airport	GA	0
Culpeper	CJR		KCJR	Culpeper Regional Airport (T.I. Martin Field)	GA	13
Danville	DAN	DAN	KDAN	Danville Regional Airport	GA	24
Dublin	PSK	PSK	KPSK	New River Valley Airport	GA	0
Emporia	EMV		KEMV	Emporia–Greensville Regional Airport	GA	0
Farmville	FVX		KFVX	Farmville Regional Airport	GA	7
Franklin	FKN	FKN	KFKN	Franklin Regional Airport	GA	0
Front Royal	FRR	FRR	KFRR	Front Royal–Warren County Airport	GA	3
Galax / Hillsville	HLX		KHLX	Twin County Airport	GA	0
Hot Springs	HSP	HSP	KHSP	Ingalls Field	GA	8
Jonesville	0VG			Lee County Airport	GA	0
Louisa	LKU	LOW	KLKU	Louisa County Airport (Freeman Field)	GA	2
Luray	LUA		KLUA	Luray Caverns Airport	GA	0
Marion / Wytheville	MKJ		KMKJ	Mountain Empire Airport	GA	3
Martinsville	MTV		KMTV	Blue Ridge Airport	GA	0
Melfa	MFV	MFV	KMFV	Accomack County Airport	GA	6
Norfolk / Chesapeake	CPK		KCPK	Chesapeake Regional Airport	GA	0
Orange	OMH		KOMH	Orange County Airport	GA	5
Petersburg	PTB	PTB	KPTB	Dinwiddie County Airport	GA	4
Quinton	W96			New Kent County Airport	GA	13
Richlands	JFZ		KJFZ	Tazewell County Airport	GA	0
Richmond / Ashland	OFP		KOFP	Hanover County Municipal Airport	GA	18
South Boston	W78			William M. Tuck Airport	GA	0
South Hill	AVC		KAVC	Mecklenburg–Brunswick Regional Airport	GA	0
Suffolk	SFQ		KSFQ	Suffolk Executive Airport	GA	0
Tangier	TGI		KTGI	Tangier Island Airport	GA	0
Tappahannock	XSA		KXSA	Tappahannock-Essex County Airport (replaced Tappahannock Municipal)	GA	11
West Point	FYJ		KFYJ	Middle Peninsula Regional Airport	GA	6
Winchester	OKV	WGO	KOKV	Winchester Regional Airport	GA	20
Wise	LNP	LNP	KLNP	Lonesome Pine Airport	GA	1
				**Other public-use airports** (not listed in NPIAS)		
Blackstone	BKT	BKT	KBKT	Allen C. Perkinson Airport / Blackstone Army Airfield		
Bridgewater	VBW		KVBW	Bridgewater Air Park		
Bumpass	7W4			Lake Anna Airport		
Chase City	CXE		KCXE	Chase City Municipal Airport		
Chester	2G6			McLaughlin Seaplane Base		
Clarksville	W63			Lake Country Regional Airport (was Marks Municipal Airport)		0
Crewe	W81			Crewe Municipal Airport		
Forest	W90			New London Airport		
Fredericksburg	EZF		KEZF	Shannon Airport		
Gordonsville	GVE	GVE	KGVE	Gordonsville Municipal Airport		
Grundy	GDY		KGDY	Grundy Municipal Airport		
Kenbridge	W31			Lunenburg County Airport		
Lawrenceville	LVL	LVL	KLVL	Lawrenceville–Brunswick Municipal Airport		
Lynchburg	W24			Falwell Airport		
Moneta	W91			Smith Mountain Lake Airport		
New Market	8W2			New Market Airport		
Saluda	W75			Hummel Field		13
Wakefield	AKQ		KAKQ	Wakefield Municipal Airport		
Waynesboro	W13			Eagle's Nest Airport		
Weirwood	9VG			Campbell Field Airport		
Williamsburg	JGG		KJGG	Williamsburg-Jamestown Airport		39
				**Other military/government airports**		
Fort A.P Hill / Bowling Green	APH	APH	KAPH	A.P. Hill Army Airfield		
Chesapeake	NFE		KNFE	NALF Fentress		
Dahlgren	NDY	DGN	KNDY	NSWC Dahlgren		
Fort Belvoir	DAA	DAA	KDAA	Davison Army Airfield		
Fort Eustis	FAF	FAF	KFAF	Felker Army Airfield		
Hampton	LFI	LFI	KLFI	Langley Air Force Base		1,370
Norfolk	NGU	NGU	KNGU	NS Norfolk (Chambers Field)		16,703
Virginia Beach	NTU	NTU	KNTU	NAS Oceana (Apollo Soucek Field)		89
Quantico	NYG	NYG	KNYG	MCAF Quantico (Turner Field)		
Wallops Island	WAL	WAL	KWAL	Wallops Flight Facility (NASA)		
Williamsburg / Camp Peary	W94			Camp Peary Landing Strip		
				**Notable private-use airports**		
Manassas	VG57			Whitman Strip (formerly public-use, FAA: 0V5)		
Somerville	3VG7			Hartwood Airport (formerly public-use, FAA: 8W8)		
				**Notable former airports**		
Arlington				Hoover Field (closed 1941)		
Fairfax County				Beacon Field Airport (closed 1959)		
Fairfax County				Falls Church Airpark (closed 1960)		
Fairfax County				Washington-Virginia Airport (closed 1970)		
Tappahannock	~~W79~~			Tappahannock Municipal Airport (closed 2007)	~~GA~~	

== See also ==
- Essential Air Service
- Virginia World War II Army Airfields
- Wikipedia:WikiProject Aviation/Airline destination lists: North America#Virginia
