= Skyline Mall =

- The front of the mall just after it closed
- Location: Falls Church, Virginia, United States
- Coordinates: 38°50′42″N 77°7′4.6″W
- Address: 5115 Leesburg Pike
- Opened: 1977
- Closed: 2002
- Num. of stores: 30 (former)
- Num. of anchor tenants: 1
- Floors: 1
- Parking: Large parking lot in front

Skyline Mall was a small enclosed shopping mall located among the high rises of Bailey's Crossroads in Falls Church, Virginia. It opened on the site of the former Washington-Virginia Airport and the Sunset X-rated drive-in theater. in 1977 to join the offices of Skyline City. At its peak, the mall comprised more than thirty tenants, including a Safeway supermarket and People’s drugstore, Shoetown and a twelve-screen cinema. Other major chain tenants that formerly operated at the mall included Dress Barn and B. Dalton. The mall was purchased in 2002 by discount retailer Target Corporation, who replaced the majority of the complex (except for a fitness center on the second level) with a Target store.
