= HWY =

HWY may refer to:

- Highway
- High Wycombe railway station in England
- HWY: An American Pastoral, a film by Jim Morrison
- Warrenton–Fauquier Airport, in Virginia, United States
