= GDY =

GDY may refer to:

- GDY, the FAA LID code for Grundy Municipal Airport, Virginia, United States
- GDY, the Indian Railways station code for Guindy railway station, Chennai, Tamil Nadu, India
