= Campbell Field =

Campbell Field may refer to:

- Campbell Field Airport, a public use airport in Weirwood, Virginia, United States
- Bruce Campbell Field, a public use airport in Madison, Mississippi, United States
- Campbell Army Airfield, a military airport at Fort Campbell, Kentucky, United States
- Campbell's Field, a former baseball park in Camden, New Jersey, United States
- Campbell Field (Colorado), a football stadium in Golden, Colorado, United States
