= FVX =

FVX or Fvx can refer to:

- Farmville Regional Airport, an airport in Farmville, Virginia, U.S., by FAA code; see List of airports in Virginia
- Ferrivauxite, a mineral; see List of mineral symbols#F
- FVX Research, a front organization run by the U.S. Federal Bureau of Investigation
- Fraser Valley Express, a part of the Central Fraser Valley Transit System serving British Columbia province, Canada
