= Clarksville Airport =

Clarksville Airport may refer to:

- Clarksville Municipal Airport, serving Clarksville, Arkansas, United States
- Clarksville-Montgomery County Regional Airport (Outlaw Field), serving Clarksville, Tennessee, United States
- Clarksville/Red River County Airport (Trissell Field), serving Clarksville, Texas, United States
- Lake Country Regional Airport in Clarksville, Virginia, United States
