= An American Prayer =

Studio album by Jim Morrison & the Doors
- Released: November 17, 1978
- Recorded: March 1969 & December 1970 (spoken word and "Roadhouse Blues"); 1978 (music) using a professional 24-track machine
- Genres: Jazz rock; poetry; easy listening; spoken word
- Length: 38:40; 46:49 (1995 reissue)
- Labels: Elektra, Asylum (1978 LP); Rhino (1995 CD)
- Producers: John Haeny; Ray Manzarek; Robby Krieger; John Densmore; Frank Lisciandro

Jim Morrison & the Doors chronology
The Best of The Doors (1973)	An American Prayer (1978)	Greatest Hits (1980)

Singles from An American Prayer
- 1. "Roadhouse Blues (Live)" / "A Feast Of Friends" Released: 1978; 2. "The Ghost Song" Released: 1995

An American Prayer is the ninth and final studio album by the American rock band the Doors, released on November 17, 1978 by Elektra Records. Following the 1971 death of vocalist Jim Morrison and the band's breakup in 1973, the surviving members of the Doors reconvened to record music to accompany several of Morrison's spoken word recordings. It was the only album by the Doors to be nominated for a Grammy Award in the Spoken Word category.

Keyboardist Ray Manzarek perceived An American Prayer as being divided into five parts, with the first covering Morrison's childhood, the second covering his high school years, the third concerning "the young poet, stoned on a rooftop with acid dreams", the fourth covering his musical career and finally the fifth being a "final summation in a way, of the man's entire life and his philosophy."

== Background ==
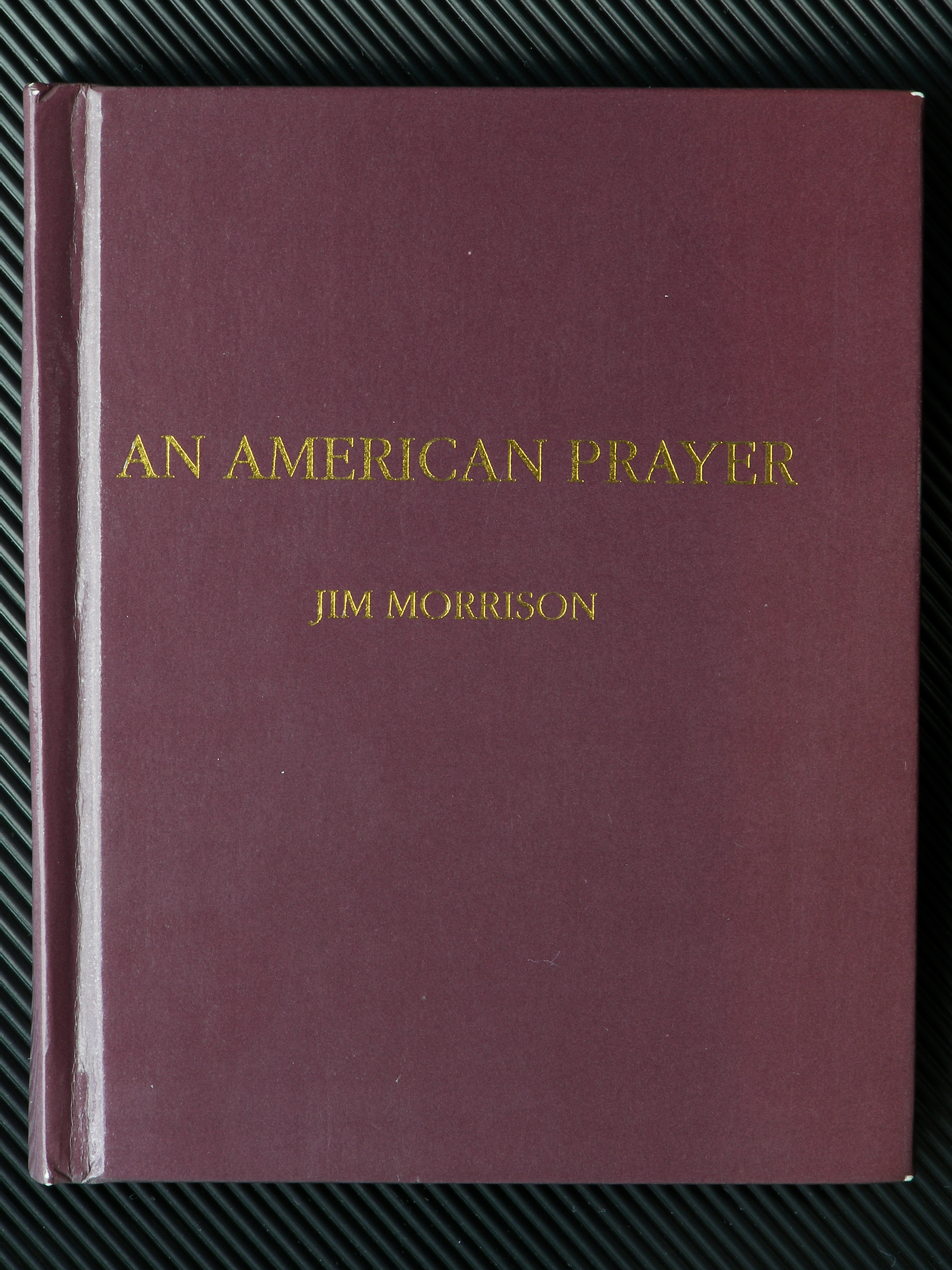
A 1970 privately printed version of the An American Prayer poetry book

The Doors formed in 1965 and released six studio albums before singer/lyricist Jim Morrison's death in July 1971. The surviving band members (keyboardist Ray Manzarek, guitarist Robby Krieger, and drummer John Densmore) recorded two additional albums as a trio, but broke up in 1973.

Morrison had originally recorded some of his poetry between 1969 and 1970; the first sessions took place in either Elektra's recording studios or Sunset Sound Studios in Hollywood, California, while the last recordings were made in Village Recorders, West Los Angeles. The first session included poems like "Bird of Prey", "Under Waterfall" and "Orange County", sung a cappella by Morrison with the latter cut featuring piano played by him. By January 1971, after the completion of these recordings, Morrison had developed some concepts for the album cover art, and was in correspondence with artist T. E. Breitenbach to design this cover in the form of a triptych. Prior to leaving for Paris in March 1971, Morrison had also approached composer Lalo Schifrin as a possible collaborator on the music to accompany the poetry, instead of the other members of the Doors.

In 1978, Ray Manzarek, Robby Krieger and John Densmore reunited to record the music for An American Prayer. On November 19, 1978, in the Los Angeles Times, Ray Manzarek explained, "We did this album to show the side of Jim which has been underrated all these years." Morrison's friend Frank Lisciandro served as one of the co-producers of the album, while Pamela Courson's father "Corky" Courson was also involved in the record. According to the book Break on Through, when recording the music, the three Doors members decided to produce a different musical style from Morrison's original vision of orchestral music on the project. Other pieces of music and spoken word recorded by the Doors and Morrison were also used in the audio collage, such as dialogue from Morrison's film HWY: An American Pastoral, snippets from jam sessions, excerpts from interviews, and featuring sections from "The WASP (Texas Radio and the Big Beat)" and "Riders on the Storm". Densmore devised an early use of synthesized drums for the former.

== Artwork ==
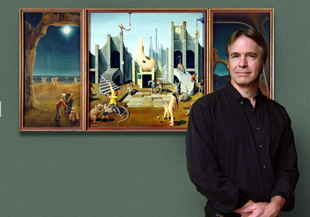
Artist T. E. Breitenbach with The Jim Morrison Triptych that was supposed to be the cover art of An American Prayer.

After Morrison had done his recordings, he asked American artist T. E. Breitenbach to design the cover for the album. He sent him a letter about his suggestions for the concept:

"Try doing a triptych. The left panel depicting a radiant moon-lit beach and an endless stream of young naked couples running silently along the water's edge. On the beach, a tiny infant grins at the universe and around its crib stand several ancient, old people ... The center, a modern city or metropolis of the future at noon, insane with activity ... The last panel, a view through a car windshield at night on a long straight desert highway."

After Morrison's death however, the album's producers were unaware of his intention to use the painting, and used for the front and back cover photos taken by Edmund Teske and Joel Brodsky respectively. The existence of this lost painting collaboration came to light decades later, when the artist himself posted it on his website.

== Release and reception ==
Professional ratings
Review scores
Source	Rating
AllMusic	2/5 stars
Christgau's Record Guide	C
The Encyclopedia of Popular Music	2/5 stars
Entertainment Weekly	C
The Great Rock Discography	4/10
MusicHound Rock	2/5 stars
Music Story	3.5/5 stars
The Rolling Stone Album Guide	2.5/5 stars
Sounds	5/5 stars

An American Prayer was released on November 17, 1978, as "a Jim Morrison Album" with "Music by the Doors". It initially sold approximately 250,000 copies, making it the best-selling spoken word album at the time. According to John Haeny, it later exceeded one million copies sold. The album includes a composite live version of "Roadhouse Blues", which received some radio airplay on rock radio stations. The album peaked at number 54 on the US charts. It was also nominated for the 1980 Grammy Award for Best Spoken Word Album.

Despite receiving a RIAA platinum certification in the US, An American Prayer received mixed reviews and still divides critics. When the album was originally released, longtime Doors' producer Paul A. Rothchild castigated it as a "RAPE of Jim Morrison." Rothchild claimed that he had heard all of the reels of master tapes from both the 1969 and the 1970 poetry sessions, and insisted that the three remaining Doors failed to realize Morrison's original intent for an audio presentation of the poetry. In a review published in Creem magazine in January 1979, musician Patti Smith felt that the record had some "certain flaws", but commended the fact that it "documents a fragment of the passion of Jim Morrison", adding that, "An American Prayer has been pieced together delicately with obsessive devotion." John Haeny (who recorded the original session tapes with Morrison in 1970) wrote in a 2013 essay: "I want people to understand that this album was made by those people who were closest to Jim, both personally and artistically. Everyone had the best intentions" and that, "I believe Jim would be pleased. Jim would have understood our motivation and appreciated our dedication and heartfelt handling of his work."

In his 1981 review, Robert Christgau rated An American Prayer "C" (which is about average on his scale). He praised the music accompaniment by the surviving members, but criticized Morrison as "a bad poet". Rolling Stone described the record as "intriguing" but "suitable mainly for Morrison fanatics." On the occasion of the 1995 reissue release, Entertainment Weekly journalist David Browne similarly wrote that An American Prayer is "primarily for those who place great weight on Jim Morrison." More recently, Vik Iyengar of AllMusic found the album "interesting", but concluded that it's "not for everyone, but is a must-own for Doors completists and fans of Jim Morrison's poetry." Fellow AllMusic critic Matthew Greenwald in contrast, lauded it as an "excellent and underrated" album.

== Track listing ==
Poetry, lyrics and stories are written and recited by Jim Morrison; the music is composed by Ray Manzarek, Robby Krieger and John Densmore. Details are taken from the original 1978 US Elektra Records release.

Side one
No.	Title	Length
1.	"Awake": "Awake" (0:35); "Ghost Song" (2:50); "Dawn's Highway" (1:21); "Newborn Awakening" (2:24)	7:10
2.	"To Come of Age": "To Come of Age" (1:01); "Black Polished Chrome" (1:07); "Latino Chrome" (2:14); "Angels and Sailors" (2:46); "Stoned Immaculate" (1:33)	8:41
3.	"The Poets Dream": "The Movie" (1:36); "Curses, Invocations" (1:54)	3:30
Total length:		19:21

Side two
No.	Title	Length
4.	"The World on Fire": "American Night" (0:28); "Roadhouse Blues" (Live) (5:53); "The World On Fire" (1:06); "Lament" (2:18); "The Hitchhiker" (2:15)	12:00
5.	"An American Prayer": "An American Prayer" (3:04); "Hour For Magic" (1:17); "Freedom Exists" (0:20); "A Feast of Friends" (2:10)	6:51
Total length:		18:51

=== Bonus tracks ===
No.	Title	Length
6.	"Babylon Fading"	1:40
7.	"Bird of Prey"	1:03
8.	"The Ghost Song" (extended version; includes a hidden spoken poetry section at the epilogue)	5:16

Notes

- Morrison's vocals in "Bird of Prey" were later sampled for the 2000 Fatboy Slim song "Sunset (Bird of Prey)".
- Morrison's shout, "Wake up!" in "Awake" was sampled in the 1991 Orbital song "Choice".
- Morrison's vocals from "Angels and Sailors" appeared on Bad Company's track "Ladies of Spain".

== Personnel ==
Per the 2018 reissue liner notes:

The Doors

- Jim Morrison – vocals and spoken words, drawings (printed on the gatefold sleeve)
- Robby Krieger – guitar, production, direction
- Ray Manzarek – keyboards, production, direction
- John Densmore – drums, production, direction

Additional personnel

- Bob Glaub – bass guitar (including on "Ghost Song")
- Jerry Scheff – bass guitar on "Adagio"
- Reinol Andino – percussion
- Arthur Barrow – synthesizer programming on "The Movie"

Production

- John Haeny – production
- Frank Lisciandro – production, assistant engineering, inside photography, direction
- Babe Hill, Paul Black, Fritz Richmond, John Weaver, Cheech D'Amico, Ron Garrett, Rik Pekkonen, James Ledner – assistant engineering
- Bernie Grundman – mastering
- Bruce Botnick – remastering, engineering
- Paul A. Rothchild – 1995 remastering
- John Van Hamersveld, Ron Coro, Johnny Lee – art direction
- Paul Ferrara – engineering, inside front cover photography
- Edmund Teske – front cover photography
- Joel Brodsky – back cover photography
- Art Kane – inside back cover photography

== Charts ==
=== Album ===
Chart (1979)	Peak position
Australian Albums (Kent Music Report)	80
US Billboard 200	54

Chart (1995)	Peak position
Australian Albums (ARIA)	20
Belgian Albums (Ultratop Flanders)	24
Belgian Albums (Ultratop Wallonia)	40
Dutch Albums (Album Top 100)	42
German Albums (Offizielle Deutsche Charts)	79
Norwegian Albums (VG-lista)	27
US Top Catalog Albums (Billboard)	1

=== Singles ===
Year	Single	Chart	Peak position
1995	"The Ghost Song"	Australian Singles Chart	48
1995	"The Ghost Song"	UK Singles Chart	98

== Certifications ==
Region	Certification	Certified units/sales
United States (RIAA)	Platinum	1,000,000^{^}
^{^} Shipments figures based on certification alone.

== See also ==
- Outline of the Doors
