= The Jim Morrison Triptych =

1971 painting by T. E. Breitenbach

The Morrison Triptych
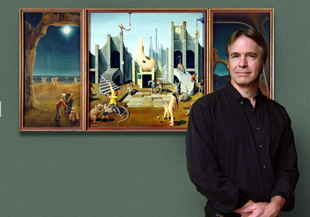
- Artist: T. E. Breitenbach
- Year: 1971
- Type: Oil on wood panel
- Dimensions: 61 cm × 122 cm (24 in × 48 in)
- Location: Collection of the artist

The Jim Morrison Triptych is a 1971 oil painting by American artist T. E. Breitenbach (best known for his painting Proverbidioms) in collaboration with Jim Morrison of The Doors. It was initially intended for use on Morrison's An American Prayer album, and completed shortly before Morrison's death.

== The Jim Morrison Triptych ==
In the fall of 1970, while at college, Breitenbach sent pictures of his surrealistic artwork to Jim Morrison and offered to paint an album cover. Morrison accepted and sent Breitenbach his ideas for the painting, along with two autographed, private editions of his poetry. Morrison liked the finished product and asked if he could use it on an album of poetry he was working on. This was his An American Prayer album published seven years after Morrison's death. Unfortunately, the album’s producers were not aware of Morrison’s intention to use the painting. The existence of this lost painting collaboration came to light decades later, when the artist posted it on his website.

Morrison sent the artist these suggestions for the painting, "Try doing a triptych. The left panel depicting a radiant moon-lit beach and an endless stream of young naked couples running silently along the water's edge. On the beach, a tiny infant grins at the universe and around its crib stand several ancient, old people ... The center, a modern city or metropolis of the future at noon, insane with activity ... The last panel, a view through a car windshield at night on a long straight desert highway."

Morrison biographer Jerry Hopkins, in a letter to Breitenbach, explained the meaning of the painting: "the beach scene ... is a variation on a dream he told several people he had ... The center would be an extension of his interest in chaos and insanity ... and the final panel refers to a scene from his childhood when he and his father came upon an overturned truck, dead and injured Indians scattered 'on dawn's highway bleeding.' (See the lyric of Peace Frog.") Biographer Stephen Davis suggests, "These vivid scenes of death and rebirth were reflective of the new beginning Jim himself was seeking." Davis also suggests that Jim had in mind two recent poems "Vast Radiant Beach" and "Come, They Crooned the Ancient Ones".

Many years later, Breitenbach turned an idea from Morrison's poems "The Lords" and "The New Creatures" into an illustrated fantasy novel titled Grumparar's the New Creatures: An Adventure and Field Guide. Morrison described the Lords as a hidden, secretive group that somehow controlled us from behind the scenes, though in Breitenbach's book these characters are far less sinister.
