= W63 =

W63 may refer to:

- W63 (nuclear warhead)
- Lake Country Regional Airport, in Clarksville, Virginia, United States
- Saku Station, in Hokkaido, Japan
