= When You're Strange =

2009 American film

- Theatrical poster
- Directed by: Tom DiCillo
- Written by: Tom DiCillo
- Produced by: John Beug; Jeff Jampol; Peter Jankowski; Dick Wolf
- Narrated by: Johnny Depp
- Cinematography: Paul Ferrara
- Edited by: Micky Blythe; Kevin Krasny
- Music by: The Doors
- Distributed by: Rhino Entertainment
- Release dates: January 17, 2009 (Sundance); April 9, 2010 (United States)
- Running time: 86 minutes
- Country: United States
- Language: English
- Box office: $1.2–$2.8 million

When You're Strange is a 2009 music documentary film about the American rock band the Doors. It was written and directed by Tom DiCillo and narrated by Johnny Depp. The film covers the band's formation in 1965, its development over the next two years, the release of its debut album and subsequent albums, and vocalist Jim Morrison's extensive use of alcohol and drugs, which led to his death in Paris in July 1971. The film features archival footage of rehearsals, TV broadcasts and concert performances, private cine-film and the background to Morrison's arrest at a 1969 Miami concert and later trial. It also includes the first public release of material from Morrison's 1969 featurette HWY: An American Pastoral.

The Doors' keyboardist Ray Manzarek, who was not pleased with the 1991 biopic The Doors, stated prior to the film's release that "This will be the true story of the Doors ... the anti-Oliver Stone."

== Production ==
When the film entered production, the surviving members of the band decided not to be too involved in the project to try to obtain the right neutral balance that an outsider would try to achieve.

== Release ==
The documentary was first screened at the Sundance Film Festival on January 17, 2009. It received somewhat favorable reviews from that showing, but the narration (by director DiCillo) was singled out by most viewers as very seriously flawed for its monotonous delivery. Due to the rash of complaints about the narration, Johnny Depp was hired to redub it. A few months later, DiCillo pronounced the film "just about locked" and announced that there would be a showing of the new "redux" version. It debuted at the Los Angeles Film Festival on Sunday, June 21, 2009.

The completed film was also screened at the London Film Festival on October 16–18, 2009. The film was released in theaters on April 9, 2010, with a soundtrack release on April 6, 2010. It was released in Canada on April 15, 2010. PBS broadcast this film as part of its series American Masters on May 12, 2010. The film was released on DVD on June 29, 2010.

=== Soundtrack ===
A film soundtrack entitled When You're Strange: Music from the Motion Picture featuring 14 Doors' songs and Morrison's poetry read by Johnny Depp was released to coincide with the film's release.

== Reception ==
On Rotten Tomatoes, When You're Strange holds a 60% approval rating with an average rating of 5.7/10 based on 70 critic reviews. The consensus notes: "It's far from a critical assessment of the band's music or its legacy, but When You're Strange gives fans a beautifully filmed, lovingly assembled tribute to the Doors." Metacritic assigned the film a weighted average score of 55 out of 100 based on 18 critic reviews, indicating "mixed or average reviews". In France, distributed by MK2, the film was released under its original title and received an excellent reception.

Doors guitarist Robby Krieger felt "really happy" about how the film turned out, crediting in particular the editing work. Krieger believed that the film put together a more accurate portrayal of Morrison than The Doors did: "I think when you see the Oliver Stone movie – I'm amazed how good Val Kilmer did – but, you know, the problem with that movie is that the script was kind of stupid. It doesn't really capture how Jim was at all. This gives you a much better insight into how his mind worked, I think." Drummer John Densmore also reported that he liked the film very much.

=== Accolades ===
The film was nominated for an Emmy Award for Outstanding Nonfiction Series following its airing on American Masters on PBS.

In December 2010, the film was nominated for a Grammy Award for Best Long Form Video and subsequently won the award in February 2011.
