= Feast of Friends =

- Directed by: Paul Ferrara
- Produced by: The Doors, John Albarian, Matt Friedman
- Starring: The Doors
- Cinematography: Paul Ferrara
- Edited by: Frank Lisciandro
- Music by: The Doors
- Production company: Eagle Rock
- Release dates: 29 September 1969 (New York Film Festival); November 2014
- Running time: 50 minutes (1969 version); 144 minutes (2014 version)
- Country: United States
- Language: English

Feast of Friends is a 1969 documentary film about the American rock band the Doors. It was directed by Paul Ferrara, Babe Hill and the Doors. Ferrara followed the Doors between April and September 1968, filming excerpts of concert performances, conversations between the band and the band relaxing backstage. Hill recorded the audio using a portable Nagra recorder.

The documentary was never officially completed, although it was shown at film festivals. A restored version was released on DVD and Blu-ray in 2014.

== Cast ==
- Jim Morrison as himself
- Ray Manzarek as himself
- Robby Krieger as himself
- John Densmore as himself

== Production ==
Filming using 16mm cameras took place during the band's 1968 summer tour. Although all of the band's Hollywood Bowl appearance in July 1968 was recorded, few other songs by the Doors were recorded in their entirety. Towards the end of the summer of 1968, the band reviewed the expenditure on the film and halted any further recording. Frank Lisciandro (who had attended film school at UCLA with Morrison and Manzarek) undertook to create a first cut of the film. The band would then decide whether to continue.

However, another event was to have a major impact on the project. At a March 1969 concert in Miami, Morrison was arrested after allegedly exposing himself onstage. The film was then cancelled.

Bruce Botnick, the band's long-time engineer/co-producer and Anna Coker restored the soundtrack for the 2014 release.

== Release ==
Lisciandro's 50 minute cut was shown at film festivals including the New York Film Festival on September 29, 1969.

The film was released on DVD and Blu-ray in 2014 in a longer version.

The DVD release includes the 1968 British documentary The Doors Are Open, a featurette titled Feast Of Friends: Encore including behind-the-scenes outtakes, as well as additional bonus features.

== Reception ==
In a review for Ultimate Classic Rock, Dave Swanson wrote; "The live footage within is simply incredible, and the remastering of both audio and video is as good as it gets. The down side, however, is that a snapshot can only give you so much information." UnCut wrote the film "doesn’t have much in the way of narrative, but it makes up for it in sheer beauty, a powerful Doors quality. Notionally an account of the band’s 1968 American tour, in truth that fact is more something that you discover for yourself than from the film."
