= Frank Lisciandro =

Frank Lisciandro is an American filmmaker, writer and photographer born in Brooklyn, New York. He studied Photojournalism at Michigan State University and Motion Picture production and writing at the University of California, Los Angeles (UCLA), graduating with an MFA; while at UCLA he studied photography with the renowned American photographer Robert Heinecken.

His works have appeared in books, magazines, documentary films, newspapers and record albums. His photographs have been shown in solo exhibitions and group shows in the US, Italy and France. He has directed, produced and written more than 20 documentary films including "The Sugar Film", "The Target Zone", "Under the Influence" and "Siamo Fuori".

== The Doors and Jim Morrison ==
While at UCLA, Lisciandro developed a close friendship with Jim Morrison and Ray Manzarek – singer and keyboardist with Doors respectively. He has been involved in several posthumous Morrison projects. In 1979, he co-produced Jim Morrison's album of poetry An American Prayer that was nominated for a Grammy Award and won the Dutch Edison Award. His work includes these books about Morrison and The Doors: An Hour for Magic, Feast of Friends, Jim Morrison: Diario Fotografico, Jim Morrison: Friends Gathered Together. He edited the documentaries Feast of Friends and Dawn's Highway; and edited and co-directed the film HWY: An American Pastoral.

His rock music photographs have appeared in Rolling Stone, the French magazine Rock & Folk, British music publications New Musical Express (NME), Uncut and Mojo as well as Italian publications La Republica and L'Unita.

== Shows ==
Solo

(selective)

- 1982: Museum of Rock Art
- 1993-1994: FNAC (traveling exhibit in France)
- 2004: Photographic Image Gallery, Portland, Oregon
- 2004: Galerie Harwood, Montreal, Canada
- 2007: Galleria Arteutopia Milan, Italy
- 2008: Il Castello Marchionale, Este, Italy
- 2011: "Mississippi al Po" Festival, Piacenza, Italy
- 2012: Trasimeno Blues Festival, Umbria, Italy
- 2015: Italian Book Tour, Bari, Pesaro, Roma, Torino, Italy
- 2017: Parole spalancate, International Poetry Festival Genova, Italy

Collective

- 2011: Proud Gallery, London
- 2011: Russeck Gallery, New York
- 2011: Giustina Gallery, Cultural Art Show (Oregon State University)
- 2012: Linfield Art Gallery, Linfield College, McMinnville, Oregon

== Audio ==
- 1979: An American Prayer (co-producer)

== Filmography ==
(Direction/Production/Writing)

- 1969: Hwy: An American Pastoral (co-director with Jim Morrison, and editor)
- 1970: Bongo Wolf's Revenge (cinematography)
- 1970: Feast of Friends (editor, documentary about The Doors)
- 1980: The Sugar Film
- 1998: Siamo Fuori
- 2000: Una Favola Vera
- 2011: Dawn's Highway (co-editor, a documentary about Jim Morrison)

Others

- The Target Zone
- One of the Family
- Upfront
- El Carro Nuevo
- Under the Influence

== Books ==
- An Hour for Magic (Plexus Books, UK) (multilingual)
- A Feast of Friends (Warner Books) (multilingual, 1991)
- Jim Morrison: Diario Fotografico (Giunti, Italy, 2007)
- Jim Morrison: Friends Gathered Together (2014)
