= Skyline Plaza collapse =

1973 construction accident

- Firemen bring out a worker injured in the collapse
- Date: March 2, 1973
- Location: Bailey's Crossroads, Virginia, U.S.; 38.84415°N 77.12074°W
- Cause: Building collapse due to premature removal of shoring
- Outcome: 14 construction workers killed, 35 injured

On March 2, 1973, the 26-story Skyline Plaza Tower 1 condominium building, under construction in Bailey's Crossroads in Fairfax County, Virginia, collapsed, killing 14 construction workers and injuring 35 others. The event is often erroneously referred to as the Skyline Towers collapse, after the name of an earlier series of apartment buildings in the same master-planned development of Skyline Center.

== History ==
The construction of the Skyline Plaza began in the early 1970s. The site was just south of Bailey's Crossroads in Northern Virginia, on the site of the former Washington-Virginia Airport. It sat on a prime piece of real estate that bordered both Seminary Road and Route 7. Skyline Center, location of Skyline Plaza, was going to be one of the largest complexes in Northern Virginia at the time. The building that collapsed was to have contained 468 condominium apartments. The building was set to open in August 1973. All condominium apartments had been sold and ranged in price from $23,000 to $62,000 according to the sales office.

Skyline Plaza was the second major fatal accident involving the Charles E. Smith Co. within five years. In June 1968, two floors caved in at a Crystal City office building, killing three men and injuring 29 others. Arlington County investigated the 1968 incident and blamed the accident on insufficient wooden shoring to hold up concrete being poured to form the floor above it.

Martin Lowton, 56, of Alexandria, Virginia, was inside the Skyline Plaza Tower 1 when it collapsed in 1973. He huddled under a fourth-floor staircase as concrete fell around him. He was able to escape after digging himself out of knee-deep rubble. Lowton said he had also been on the construction crew at the Crystal City building collapse in 1968.

== Collapse ==
The building collapsed while shoring was being removed from newly poured concrete between the 22nd and 23rd floors of the building, and more concrete was being placed on the 24th floor. A climbing crane on the 24th floor fell to the ground in the collapse. It was initially falsely assumed that the collapse was related to the fall of the crane. The collapse left a gap 60 feet (18 m) wide in the building from top to bottom, leaving it looking like two separate buildings.

A Fairfax County, Virginia police officer witnessed the collapse and radioed the Emergency Operations Center (EOC) at 2:18 p.m. Units responded from Fairfax County, Arlington County and Alexandria, Virginia. According to local officials, 55 men were working in the area. The day following the collapse, it was speculated that the cave-in stretched all the way to the second or third basement floor.

== Cause ==
Fairfax County hired Professor Ingvar Schousboe of the University of Illinois Urbana-Champaign, a civil engineer, to investigate the cause of the collapse. He determined that the collapse occurred because of the premature removal of shoring from beneath newly poured floors. The architectural plans specified that the wooden forms around poured concrete support piers remain in place for the two floors below the floor being poured because that concrete had not cured enough to provide the necessary support.

George Taylor, a workman for Northwest Sheet Metal, Inc., claimed that workmen were pulling concrete supports "out too fast. They're trying to hustle the job too fast."

== Costs ==
Marvin Dekelboum, executive vice president for the Smith Co., estimated the property damage at $12.5 million of the $24 million apartment building.

The concrete subcontractor at the Skyline Plaza condominium complex, Miller & Long's vice president Roger Gilbert Arnold was indicted on manslaughter charges for the deaths of Danny Ray White, Clemons Riley Holcomb, and Daniel R. Wilhite. Arnold was charged because, as the senior Miller and Long official present he was responsible for the actions of the men who removed the shoring. The maximum punishment for felony involuntary manslaughter was 1 to 5 years imprisonment. The trial resulted in a hung jury and the DA chose not to refile.

Miller & Long was fined $300 for failing to use adequate shoring beneath newly poured concrete floors. It was ruled by a judge that the building's owner, the Charles E. Smith Co., could not be held criminally responsible for the actions of its subcontractors.

Federal officials charged Miller & Long $13,000 for violations of worker safety codes.

Fairfax County barred resumption of construction at the site for 16 months following the accident. Permission to resume construction was later granted. Work resumed in July 1974 and was completed in 1977.
