= T. E. Breitenbach =

American painter (born 1951)

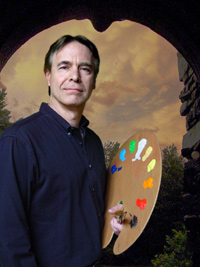
- Born: Thomas E. Breitenbach; July 29, 1951 (age 74); Queens, New York, United States
- Education: Self-taught
- Known for: Painting
- Awards: Rome Prize Fellowship

Thomas E. Breitenbach (born July 29, 1951 in Queens, New York) is a self-taught American artist best known for his painting Proverbidioms, a raucous and comical depiction of over 300 common proverbs and clichés. He also collaborated with Jim Morrison of The Doors, shortly before Morrison's 1971 death, on a painting intended for use on his An American Prayer album.

He received the Rome Prize Fellowship in visual arts. Breitenbach declined the second year of the fellowship and, inspired by the castles and museums of Europe, returned home determined to build a castle-studio to house his art and eventually become a museum. During the planning stages he painted Proverbidioms and later published it.

== Periods and technique ==
Breitenbach’s earliest works are dark allegories spurred by his vision of man’s nature as being hopelessly irrational and violent. Influenced by Carl Jung, Breitenbach's subjects are constructed using archetypal symbols and are intended to provoke strong emotional responses from the observer. Breitenbach emphasizes that these paintings are not surrealism, because surrealists tend to use personal and dream symbols which are not an effective form of language. He was awarded the Rome Prize in 1973 by the Society of Fellows of the American Academy in Rome in the visual arts category.

Proverbidioms, 1975 oil on panel

In 1974, Breitenbach started work on a painting of contemporary proverbs, idioms, and clichés, after feeling challenged by a review of Pieter Bruegel's 1559 painting of Dutch proverbs, Netherlandish Proverbs, suggesting that language was particularly colorful "back then". This became Proverbidioms, his best-known work, completed in 1975 at the age of 24. This large painting illustrates over 300 common expressions like "You are what you eat", "butterflies in the stomach", "the rat race", and so on, and identifying the sayings became a kind of puzzle for his audience. Proverbidioms has been turned into a poster, jigsaw puzzle, and appeared on the TV show Beverly Hills, 90210 in a few episodes.

After his marriage in 1979 and the birth of his first child, Breitenbach's paintings became particularly colorful. He blames this on the ultra-bright toys that were strewn about the house. He uses traditional Flemish oil-glazes, a meticulous process. Light penetrates the transparent paint layers, striking the pure-white gesso panels (made of chalk and glue) and reflecting back at the viewer, creating a luminous effect.

== Jim Morrison triptych ==
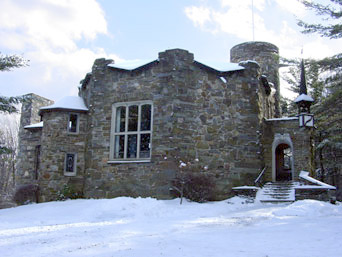
The octagonal portion of the castle

In 1970, while still at college, Breitenbach sent pictures of his artwork to Jim Morrison and offered to paint an album cover. Morrison accepted and sent Breitenbach his ideas for a triptych, along with two autographed, private editions of his poetry. Morrison liked the finished painting and asked if he could use it on an album of poetry he was working on. This was his An American Prayer album published seven years after his death. However, the album’s producers were not aware of Morrison’s intention to use the painting.

== Building a castle ==
In 1976, Breitenbach began constructing by hand a small castle, on land given him by his father. The first stage was an octagon and tower, inspired by the 1848 Victorian-era book The Octagon House by Orson Fowler. Fowler recommended the octagon as an ideal and economical shape for a house. For Breitenbach, it was also suited to a castle. In 1987 he added a large studio addition. Breitenbach quarried stones (some as long as 12 feet) from a nearby creek, cut trees for lumber, and salvaged a collapsing carriage barn for beams and siding. He forged iron hardware, made leaded-glass windows, furniture, carvings, tilework, and a fresco, so that many of the arts would be represented.

== Hieronymus, A Musical Fantasy ==
Hieronymus, A Musical Fantasy is an original musical with music, lyrics, and book by Breitenbach about Hieronymus Bosch "An artist with a 'too-large' imagination". The musical was staged and made its world premiere at Proctors Theater in Schenectady New York in 2016. It was filmed and is available to watch on PBS.

== Other art forms ==
Breitenbach has written books, including an illustrated fantasy novel "Grumparar's the New Creatures", "Proverbidioms, All the Answers and Trivia", and a book of local ghost stories. He composed music for films produced by his son, and has written two musicals, including Hieronymus, A Musical Fantasy a partly autobiographical story about medieval fantasy artist Hieronymus Bosch and his over-active imagination, and "Little Black Boxes" a magical and charming show.

== List of major works ==
=== Allegorical paintings ===
- (1970) The Jim Morrison Triptych
- (1970, 1985) Misused Cupid
- (1971) Know as Arc
- (1971) The Crucifixion
- (1972) Muchruins
- (1972, 1985) The Myth of the Cave
- (1974) Wings
- (1980) The Temptation of Saint Anybody
- (2005) The Artist in His Studio: Designing Birds

=== Puzzle paintings ===
- (1975) Proverbidioms
- (1977) Proverbidioms II
- (1983) Catchpenny
- (1985) Housecalls
- (1991) Sporttease
- (1992) Shakespearience
- (1994) Eats
- (1996) Things of the Garden
- (1999) Ultimate Proverbidioms
- (2006) A Picture of Health
- (2007) Proverbidioms IV: Who Missed the Boat?
- (2014) Accidents Waiting to Happen
