= HWY: An American Pastoral =

1969 film by Frank Lisciandro

- Directed by: Jim Morrison; Frank Lisciandro; Paul Ferrara; Babe Hill
- Screenplay by: Jim Morrison
- Story by: Jim Morrison
- Produced by: Jim Morrison; Frank Lisciandro; Paul Ferrara; Babe Hill
- Starring: Jim Morrison
- Cinematography: Paul Ferrara
- Edited by: Frank Lisciandro
- Music by: Fred Myrow; Bruce Botnick
- Distributed by: HiWay Productions (Private sphere)
- Release date: March 1970
- Running time: 52 minutes
- Country: United States
- Language: English

HWY: An American Pastoral is a featurette by Jim Morrison, Frank Lisciandro, Paul Ferrara, and Babe Hill. Starring Morrison as a mysterious hitchhiker, it is a 52-minute experimental film in Direct Cinema style. It was shot during the spring and summer of 1969 in the Mojave Desert and in Los Angeles.

In the informal 1971 interview Morrison gave to Ben Fong-Torres, Morrison states the film "was more of an exercise for me and a warm-up for something bigger."

In 2009, restored and re-mastered excerpts from HWY were featured in Tom DiCillo's documentary When You're Strange. However, the complete film was not included in the Special Features on the When You're Strange DVD, and there have been no further announcements regarding a DVD release for the film. Bootleg copies of the film (with a visible timecode at the bottom of the screen) can be found on the internet.

== Storyline ==
Well, it's about a hitchhiker who.. essentially it's just a movement from a state of nature gradually to city.

— Jim Morrison, March 1970

The opening sequence shows the anonymous hitchhiker (Jim Morrison) coming out of a pond, and putting his clothes on. He proceeds to walk up the mountain from the pond and starts walking down the highway. Meanwhile, a voice-over of Jim Morrison talks about a childhood incident in which he claims to have seen Native Americans injured in a traffic accident. He is shown emerging from a car stuck in the sand and successfully tries to pull a car over. Later, the hitchhiker is looking for a book with the car parked outside a filling station; he is shown back on the highway together with two other people and a police officer, and after he communicates with them, he gets into the car and drives off. He looks for directions on a map at night. Numerous cars are shown driving into the sunset.

Finally, the hitchhiker makes a phone call to American poet Michael McClure and reveals with a dispassionate voice that he killed someone, who is implied to be the original driver, explaining why he was not with him for the majority of the journey. The final shots show the hitchhiker at the Whisky a Go Go on the Sunset Strip in Los Angeles.

== Production ==
=== Screenplay and public screening ===
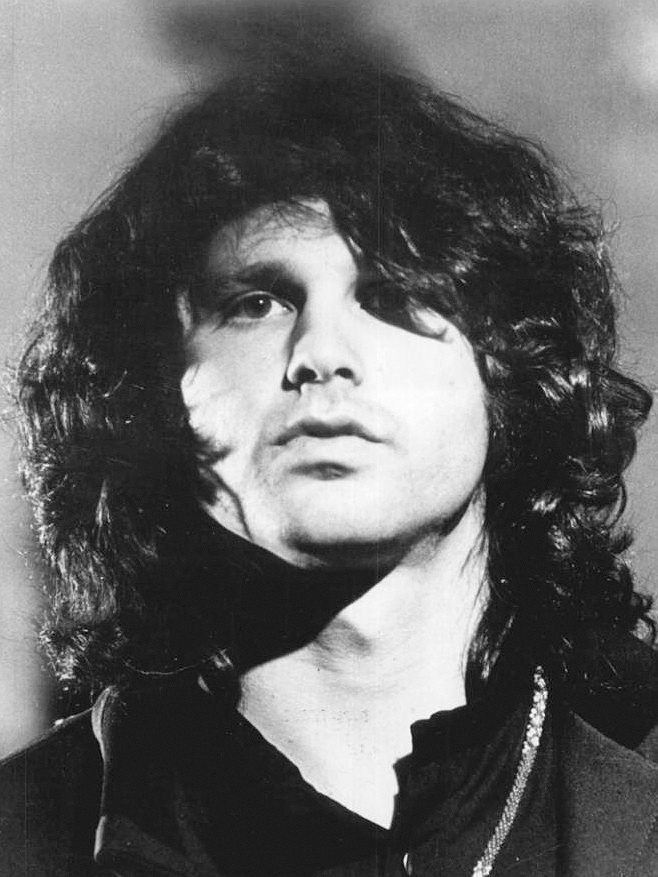
The main project was written and directed by Jim Morrison

The original, barely structured HWY screenplay, published in 1990, contained many differences from the actual 1969 film version. The film was based on Morrison's experiences as a hitchhiker during his student days. As a college student Morrison had regularly been commuting as a hitchhiker from Tallahassee 280 miles (450 km) to meet his then girlfriend Mary Werbelow in Clearwater. Morrison financed the low-budget film project through his company "HiWay Productions". The production of HWY was supported by Morrison's friends Paul Ferrara, Frank Lisciandro and Babe Hill.

Parts of the movie were meant to be used for fundraising purposes in order to complete the whole project. As soon as October 1969 the film story was outpaced, though, by the Tate-Labianca murders which were carried out by members of the Manson Family in Los Angeles and shattered the American public. Morrison showed HWY during his second stay in Paris in early 1971. The film was publicly shown in Vancouver on March 27, 1970. An audio sequence from the film was published on the Doors' spoken word album An American Prayer in 1978.

It has been suggested that the inspiration for the protagonist in the film, played by Morrison, with the script name "Billy" was based on the real hitchhiking serial killer Billy Cook who murdered six people on a 22-day rampage between Missouri and California in 1950–51. Morrison himself acknowledged this in a 1970 interview with The Village Voice, and admitted Cook to be an influence on the work.

=== Production history ===
HWY was shot on a 35mm, Arriflex camera. A list of filming locations are available. Morrison's own car, a 1967 Shelby GT500 was used in the film. In his 2007 book, Flash of Eden, co-director Paul Ferrara details Morrison's originally grander overarching vision for the film, anecdotes from the days' shooting and finally his eventual satisfaction with the "unfinished" work. Similarly, Paul Ferrara's YouTube channel hosts behind the scenes footage of the making of The Hitchhiker, which was the working title for what would later become HWY, together with a video described as Jim Morrison/"HWY" (directors cut) which includes an opening crawl of text that describes the historical context during which the film was shot.

The film's music credits are given to Fred Myrow and sound engineer Bruce Botnick, although the soundtrack was composed by Paul and Georgia Ferrara. Fred Myrow also served as the score's producer, with additional material from ethnic and world music recordings.

== Sources ==
- Davis, Stephen (2004). Jim Morrison: Life, Death, Legend. Penguin Publishing. ISBN 1-59240-064-7.
- Ferrara, Paul (2007). Flash of Eden. AuthorHouse. ISBN 978-1-4343-4070-2.
- Morrison, Jim (1990). The American Night. The Writings of Jim Morrison. London: Viking. ISBN 978-0-67973-462-8.
- Weidman, Rich (2011). The Doors FAQ: All That's Left to Know About the Kings of Acid Rock. Rowman & Littlefield. ISBN 978-1-61713-017-5.
