= Proverbidioms =

1975 painting by T. E. Breitenbach

- T. E. Breitenbach's Proverbidioms, 1975

Proverbidioms is a 1975 oil painting by American artist T. E. Breitenbach depicting over 300 common proverbs, catchphrases, and clichés such as "You are what you eat", "a frog in the throat", and "kicked the bucket". It is painted on a 45 by 67 inch wooden panel and was completed in 1975 after two years work, when the artist was 24. The included sayings are painted quite literally and appear comical and bizarre, especially if one does not at first realize what the painting is about. For example, "You are what you eat" is represented in the painting by a carrot eating a carrot. The painting also contains hidden social commentary, and a reference to Pieter Bruegel the Elder (a favorite of the artist) who did a 1559 painting of Dutch proverbs. The title Proverbidioms is a simple portmanteau word combining "proverb" with "idioms".

== History ==
Proverbidioms was completed in 1975 and published by Breitenbach as a poster in 1980, along with a list of the included sayings. It remains in print to this day, as it has proven quite popular. Several counterfeit posters have turned up over the years. In 1988, Proverbidioms was published as a jigsaw puzzle by Bits & Pieces and then by SunsOut, and is still in print. It has been licensed for other products as well. It has appeared as part of the set decoration on the TV shows Beverly Hills, 90210, As the World Turns, and on a Disney pilot. Also appeared on Highway to Heaven, 2005, season 2, episode 10, The Monster Part 1, 16 minutes, 40 seconds into the episode.

Proverbidioms is used extensively in education to teach about proverbs in classrooms, in corporate creativity workshops, in teaching the deaf, and in teaching English to foreign students. The Canadian Institute of English and the Watchtower Society in particular have taken the posters to over 100 countries for this last-mentioned purpose.

The artist painted additional versions of this title along with related themed paintings.

In 2011 Breitenbach published an eBook titled Proverbidioms: All the Answers & Trivia. This is the first time that location maps were provided for all the idioms included in the Proverbidioms series of paintings, and in the themed paintings. The artist also reveals background information and illustrates the creation process for these large works.

In 2012 an iPad app was made using the paintings.

== List of paintings in the Proverbidioms series ==
- (1975) Proverbidioms
- (1977) Proverbidioms II
- (1999) Ultimate Proverbidioms
- (2007) Proverbidioms IV: Who Missed the Boat?

== Related paintings ==
- (1983) Catchpenny
- (1985) Housecalls
- (1989) Computerese
- (1991) Sporttease
- (1992) Shakespearience
- (1994) Eats
- (1996) Things of the Garden
- (2006) A Picture of Health
