= Paul Ferrara =

American photographer

Paul Ferrara (born November 16, 1939) is an American photographer known for his relationship with singer Jim Morrison of the band the Doors. Born to Italian–American parents, Ferrara met the band after photographing Jim Morrison's girlfriend Pamela Courson. He began working with the group as a stills photographers and many of his color and black & white photos appeared in a 24-page souvenir book sold at Doors' concerts in 1968. Many iconic images of Morrison were taken by Ferrara. Ferrara also took the cover photograph of the Doors album Waiting for the Sun in Laurel Canyon, Los Angeles.

Ferrara co-directed Jim Morrison's 1969 film HWY: An American Pastoral and directed Feast of Friends which included film of the group over a five-month period touring in 1968. Hitherto unreleased, behind the scenes movies of the Doors shot by Ferrara in the late 1960s and early 1970s were included in the 2009 documentary on the band, When You're Strange.

Ferrara was in the inner circle of the Doors and self-published his memoirs from this period in Flash of Eden in 2007.
