= Falwell Airport =

General aviation airport located in Virginia (US)

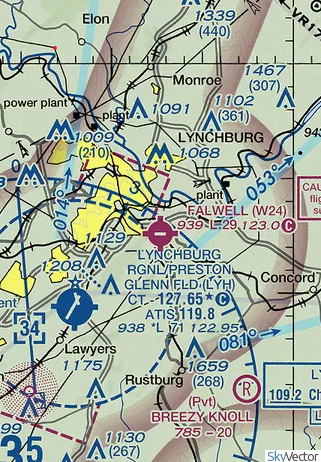
- IATA: none; ICAO: none; FAA LID: W24

Summary
- Airport type: General aviation
- Owner: Liberty University
- Operator: McLaren Corporation
- Serves: Lynchburg, Virginia
- Location: 4332 Richmond Hwy, Lynchburg, VA 24501
- Elevation AMSL: 939 ft / 286 m
- Coordinates: 37°22′40.5150″N 79°07′20.0830″W
- Interactive map of Falwell Airport

Runways
Direction	Length		Surface
Direction	ft	m	Surface
10/28	2,932	894	asphalt

Falwell Airport is a privately owned, general aviation airport located approximately five miles Southeast of Lynchburg, Virginia. The airport has been in continuous operation since 1946 and is currently owned by Freedom Aviation, part of Liberty University’s School of Aeronautics. Falwell Airport is known for its sloped runway, an unusual feature for any airport.

== History and usage ==
Falwell Airport was established as Old Fort Airport in 1946 by brothers Lawrence and Calvin Falwell. The brothers re-named the airport to Falwell Airport in the early 1970s when the nearby Confederate fort, after which the airport was originally named, was demolished for highway construction.

Falwell Airport provides aviation services including flight training and aircraft maintenance support to individuals and businesses in the local area. Facilities include terminals, hangars, maintenance bays, and a control tower. The airport also features parking facilities, retail and dining services, and access to local hotels and points of interest. There are no scheduled arrivals or departures at Falwell, but charter services are available. The Federal Aviation Administration (FAA) provides oversight of airport operations. The airport falls under the Richmond Flight Standards District Office area of responsibility.

Pilots may find the airport's topography challenging as the airport was built on a heavily graded hillside and features a "ski-slope" runway with a 150 foot drop. The significant slope restricts runway operations to taking off from runway 10, the downhill slope; and landing on runway 28, the uphill slope. Pilots must maintain extraordinary situational awareness to avoid collisions.

Liberty University purchased Falwell Aviation in 2010, furthering the mission of the university's aeronautical school. A statement from the university said that acquiring Falwell provided the university "...with a 55,500-square-foot facility consisting of three aircraft maintenance and storage hangars, maintenance workspace, flight operations, classrooms, aircraft dispatch, student study areas and customer service facilities for charter passengers and transient aircraft. It also includes five aircraft for student pilots." As of July, 2022, Mclaren Corporation serves as the FBO.

For the 12 month period ending on December 31, 2019, the airport averaged 23 flight operations per day. Of those, 79% were local general aviation and 21% were transient general aviation. Nearby military units have used Falwell for training purposes and have landed a variety of aircraft at Falwell during those exercises.

=== Significant events ===
- 1957. Navigation project. The United States Air Force established a temporary base at Falwell Airport with several radars and communications vans that were part of a navigation project conducted in the mid-Atlantic area.
- 1982. Accident. On December 21, 1982, a Cessna 150 crashed into a wooded area near the airport while attempting to land. A student pilot, identified as Franklin Hopkins of Lynchburg, lost control of the plane in high winds. He was seriously injured in the crash and was taken to Lynchburg General Hospital.
- 2015. Community outreach. The 26th Marine Expeditionary Unit held a community outreach event at the airport on April 21, 2015. The static display of aircraft included the MV-22 Osprey, UH-1 Iroquois, CH-53E Super Stallion and AH-1W Super Cobra. Marine pilots and crew were present to talk to visitors and answer questions.

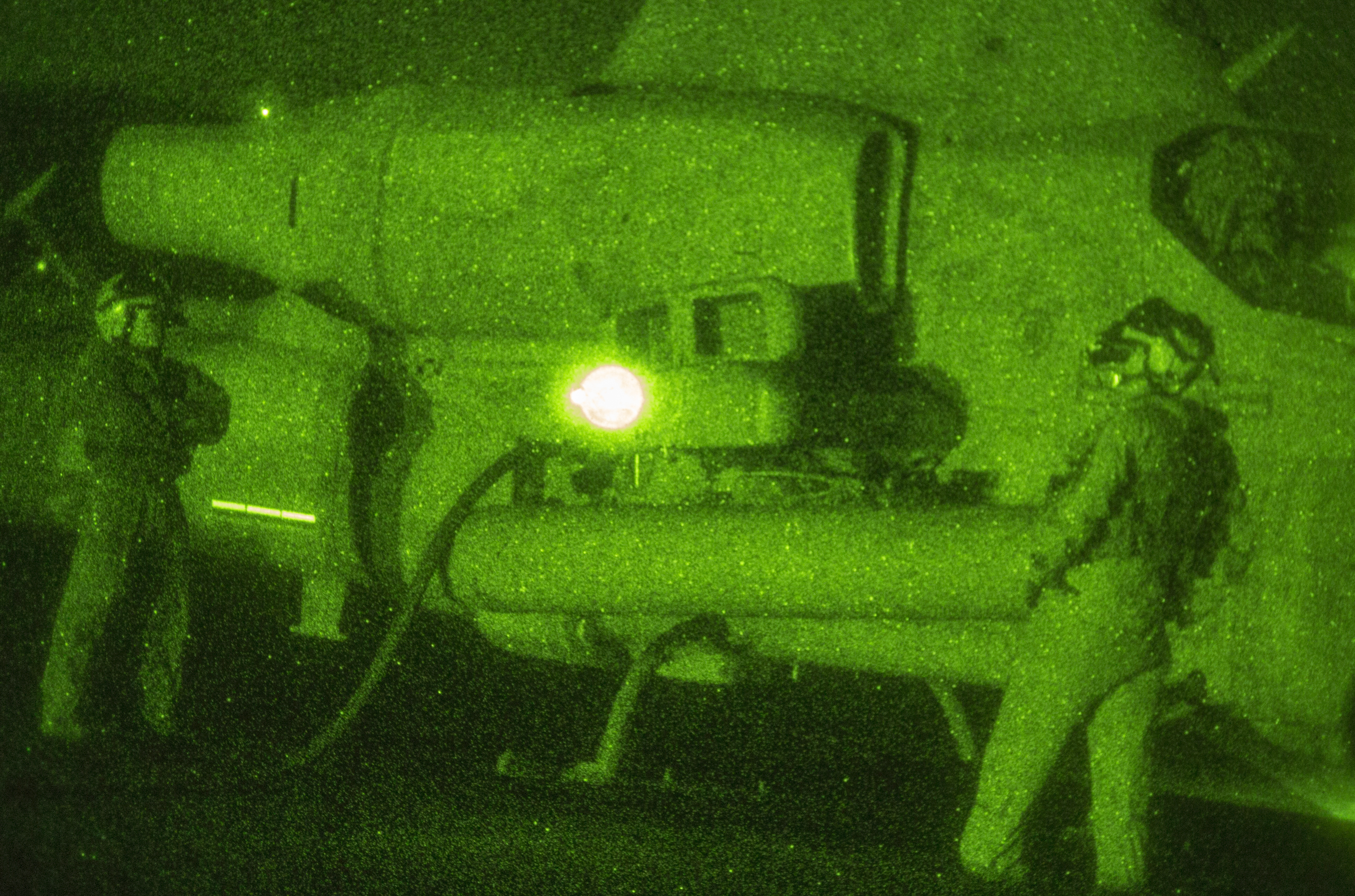
26th Marine Expeditionary Unit, conducting a night time refuel an AH-1W Super Cobra helicopter at Falwell Airport in 2015.

== Falwell family connection ==
Lawrence and Calvin Falwell were first cousins of Jerry Falwell, an American Baptist pastor and televangelist. Their great-grandfather, Hezekiah Falwell, moved to the Lynchburg area in 1850 and bought most of the northern face of Candler's Mountain. The parcel of land he acquired would host many of the Falwell family businesses over the years and a section of the land would eventually be granted to Lawrence and Calvin for the purpose of becoming an airport.

In the early days of Jerry Falwell's ministry, Lawrence and Calvin would fly him to religious services. Eventually, Jerry Falwell stopped using the airport, due to the airport's inability to offer a full instrument approach.

=== Deaths and legacies of original owners ===
Calvin Falwell died at the age of 90 on August 20, 2011. In addition to establishing the airport, Calvin was the founder of the Falwell Corporation that specializes in well drilling. Calvin Falwell also brought minor league baseball to the Lynchburg area in 1965 in what would eventually be branded as the Lynchburg Hillcats. The stadium hosting the team was named after him in 2004.

Calvin's brother, Lawrence Falwell died at the age of 94 on December 31, 2016. Both Lawrence and Calvin Falwell were inducted into the Virginia Aviation Hall of Fame and both men were recipients of the Virginia Aviation Lifetime Achievement Award.

Commenting on his uncles' efforts in helping his father's ministry, Jerry Falwell Jr. said, "I don't know that dad could have gotten around and done the things that he did without Lawrence and Calvin's aviation pioneering. It really made a big difference in my father's ministry. What they did with a hillside, building Falwell Airport, it's hard to imagine anyone could even land a plane, but they built the runway right there on the hillside and it's been successful all these years."

== See also ==
- Lynchburg Regional Airport
