= Lynchburg Regional Airport =

Airport in Virginia, United States

Lynchburg Regional Airport Preston Glenn Field
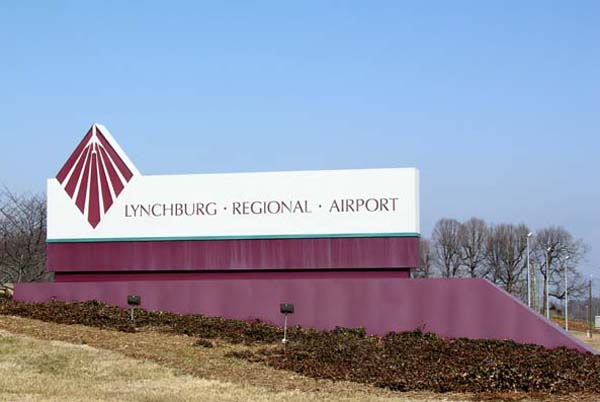
- Airport main signage, off U.S. 29

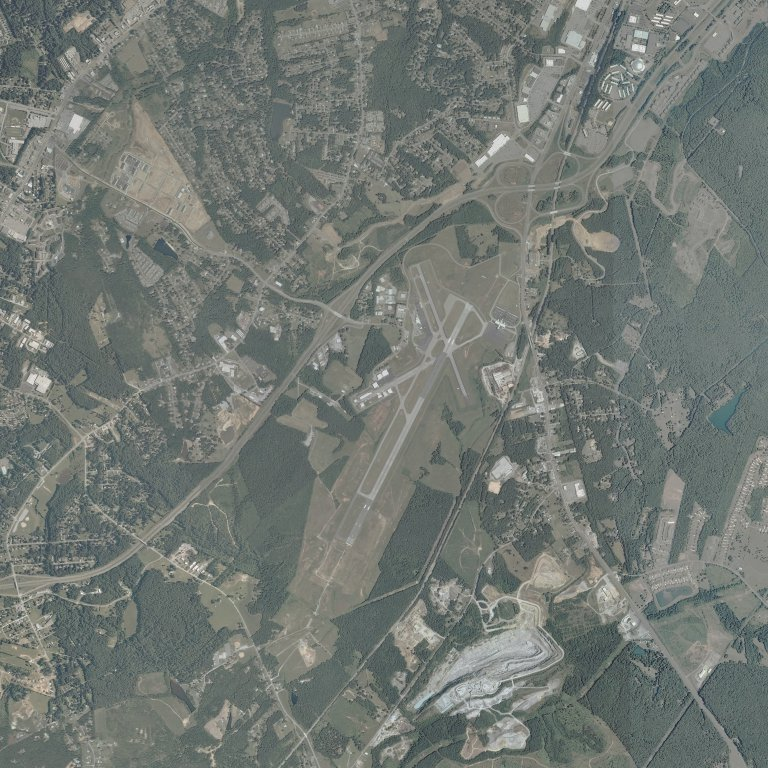
- USGS orthophoto
- IATA: LYH; ICAO: KLYH; FAA LID: LYH

Summary
- Airport type: Public
- Owner: City of Lynchburg
- Serves: Lynchburg, Virginia
- Elevation AMSL: 938 ft (286 m)
- Coordinates: 37°19′31″N 079°12′04″W
- Website: flylyh.com

Maps
- Location of airport in Virginia LYH (the United States)
- Interactive map of Lynchburg Regional Airport; Preston Glenn Field

Runways
Direction	Length		Surface
Direction	ft	m	Surface
4/22	7,100	2,164	Asphalt
17/35	3,386	1,032	Asphalt

Statistics (2022)
- Aircraft operations (year ending 1/31/2002): 99,513
- Based aircraft: 92
- Source: Federal Aviation Administration

Lynchburg Regional Airport (IATA: LYH, ICAO: KLYH, FAA LID: LYH), also known as Preston Glenn Field, is a public use airport in Campbell County, Virginia, United States. It is located at the intersection of Route 29 South and Route 460, five nautical miles (6 mi, 9 km) southwest of the central business district of the City of Lynchburg, which owns the airport. Opened in 1931, it was originally named Preston Glenn Airport in honor of Lt. Preston Glenn, a Lynchburg native who died while serving in World War I as an Army Air Corps pilot. Mostly used for general aviation, the airport is also served by two commercial airlines, American Eagle, flying Embraer ERJ-145 aircraft to Charlotte, and United Express, flying Canadair Regional Jets to Chicago-O'Hare and Washington-Dulles.

This airport is included in the National Plan of Integrated Airport Systems for 2011–2015, which categorized it as a primary commercial service facility. As per Federal Aviation Administration records, the airport had 83,392 passenger boardings (enplanements) in calendar year 2018, 86,366 enplanements in 2009, and 93,772 in 2010.

== Facilities and aircraft ==
Lynchburg Regional Airport covers an area of 872 acres (353 ha) at an elevation of 938 feet (286 m) above mean sea level. It has two asphalt paved runways: 4/22 is 7,100 by 150 feet (2,164 x 46 m) and 17/35 is 3,386 by 75 feet (1,032 x 23 m).

The new extended runway opened on August 12, 2007. It was extended by 1,301 feet (397 m) from 5,799 feet (1,768 m) to 7,100 feet (2,200 m).

For the 12-month period ending January 31, 2022, the airport had 99,513 aircraft operations, an average of 272 per day: 94% general aviation, 5% air taxi, 2% military, and <1% commercial. At that time there were 92 aircraft based at this airport: 62 single-engine, 17 multi-engine, 10 jet, and 3 helicopter.

In June 2023, Airport Director Andrew LaGala announced that the airport had received a $600k grant from the federal government, matched by a $400k grant from the City of Lynchburg. The federal funding was provided U.S. Department of Transportation (DOT) under the Small Community Air Service Development Program. Both airport and Lynchburg community officials viewed the $600,000 grant, intended for facility improvements, as an important step in expanding air service between Lynchburg and key destinations, particularly Chicago.

== Airlines and destinations ==
Airlines	Destinations
American Eagle	Charlotte
United Express	Chicago–O'Hare, Washington–Dulles

== Statistics ==
=== Top domestic routes ===
Busiest domestic routes from LYH (August 2025 – July 2026)
Rank	Destination	Passengers	Carrier
1	Charlotte, North Carolina	76,120	American
2	Chicago–O'Hare, Illinois	5,150	United
3	Washington–Dulles, Virginia	1,780	United

=== Airline market share ===
Top airlines at LYH (August 2025 – July 2026)
Rank	Airline	Passenger	Market Share
1	Piedmont Airlines	150,000	91.59%
2	SkyWest Airlines	13,780	8.41%

== Future prospects ==
In December 2019, it was reported by local media that Lynchburg Regional Airport was experiencing a considerable increase in passenger traffic and demand for additional flights and routes. The airport was reportedly in talks with United Airlines to restart the Lynchburg to Washington-Dulles route and was also negotiating with Spirit Airlines to start flights to vacation destinations in Florida.

Airport operations were adversely impacted by COVID 19 that significantly reduced the airport's pre-pandemic average of seven flights per day that included a wide range of seating options to include first-class. Since the pandemic the airport was forced to operate with main cabin seating only, with no first-class options available to passengers. By June 2023 airport officials noted that passenger traffic had reached about 85% of pre-pandemic levels, which were at their peak in 2019. As passenger counts increased, airport officials continued to seek increased commercial traffic but industry representatives claimed that a nationwide shortage of both pilots and aircraft were affecting expansion plans.

== See also ==
- Falwell Airport
- Liberty University
