= Grundy Municipal Airport =

- IATA: none; ICAO: KGDY; FAA LID: GDY

Summary
- Airport type: Public
- Owner: Town of Grundy
- Operator: Grundy Municipal Airport Commission
- Serves: Grundy, Virginia
- Elevation AMSL: 2,304 ft (702 m)
- Coordinates: 37°13′57″N 082°07′30″W
- Interactive map of Grundy Municipal Airport

Runways
Direction	Length		Surface
Direction	ft	m	Surface
4/22	2,256	688	Asphalt

Statistics (2008)
- Aircraft operations: 4,177
- Source: Federal Aviation Administration

Grundy Municipal Airport (ICAO: KGDY, FAA LID: GDY) was a public-use airport located three nautical miles (6 km) southwest of the central business district of Grundy, a town in Buchanan County, Virginia, United States. It was publicly owned by the Town of Grundy and was operated by the Grundy Municipal Airport Commission. Grundy Municipal was the only airport operating in Buchanan County. Small personal and charter planes used the facility. It was a 3 miles (5 km) drive from Grundy, the county seat of Buchanan County.

Although most U.S. airports use the same three-letter location identifier for the FAA and IATA, this airport was assigned GDY by the FAA but had no designation from the IATA.

Airport is now permanently closed as of October 31, 2019.

== Facilities and aircraft ==
Grundy Municipal Airport covered an area of 89 acres (36 ha) at an elevation of 2,304 feet (702 m) above mean sea level. It had one asphalt paved runway designated 4/22 which measured 2,256 by 60 feet (688 x 18 m). For the 12-month period ending May 31, 2008, the airport had 4,177 general aviation aircraft operations, an average of 11 per day.

== Future of the airport ==
Grundy Municipal Airport was completed in 1969 when the property it lies on was donated to the town by the United Coal Company, after surface mining created the new flat land. The lack of flat terrain in the mountainous region made it difficult to find a location suitable to sustain a proper airport facility. After 35 years of operation, many local leaders want to replace the current airport for a larger regional airport. Leaders on a local, state, and federal level have been working on creating a new regional airport serving Buchanan and Dickenson Counties. Currently, work is in the alpha stages to develop a new regional airport with the relocation of residents.

== See also ==
- Buchanan County, Virginia
- Grundy, Virginia
- Prater, Virginia
- List of airports in Virginia
