= Beacon Field Airport =

Former airport in Virginia, United States of America

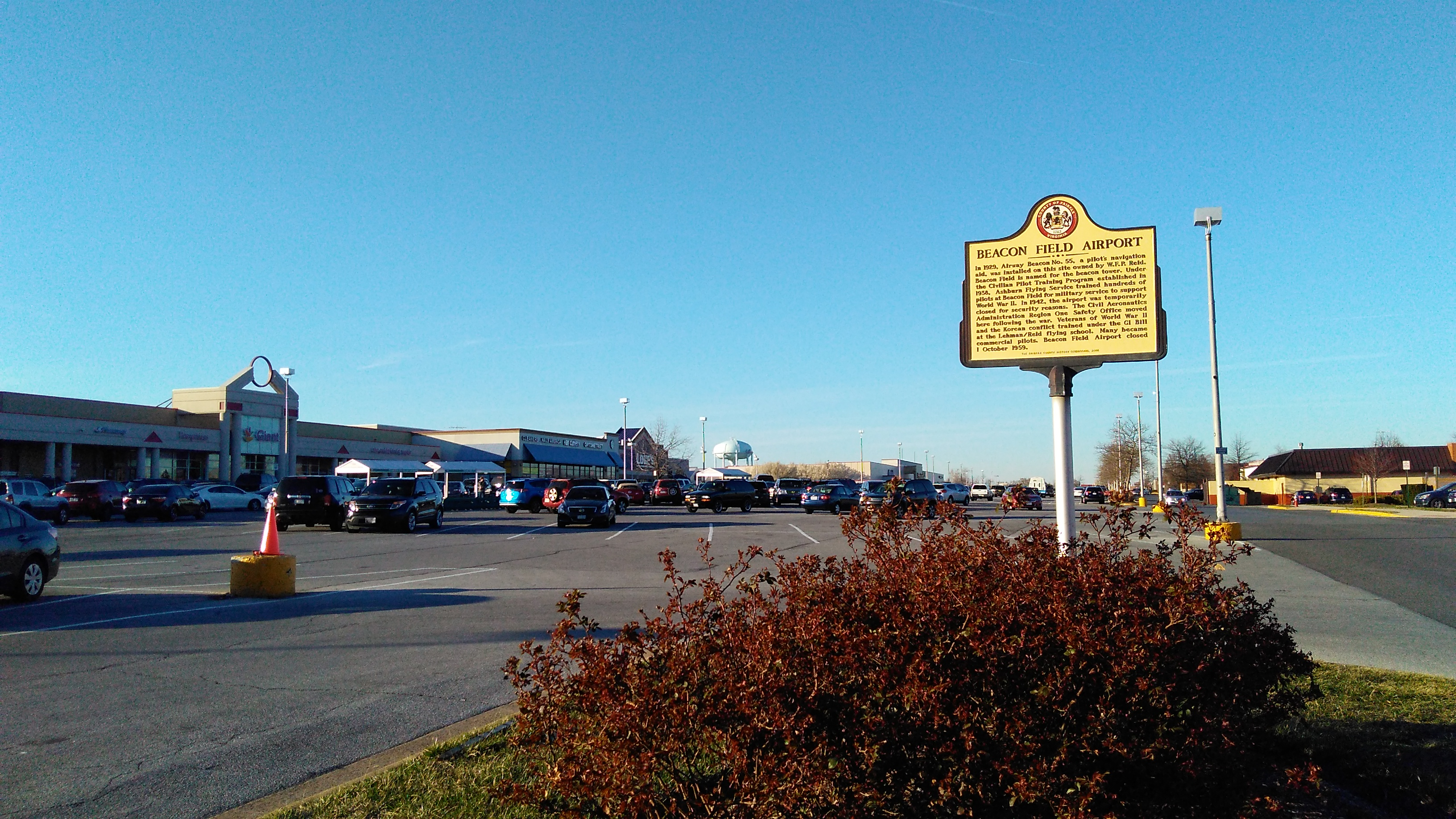
- A historic marker denotes the site of Beacon Field Airport, today the Beacon Hill Mall.
- IATA: none; ICAO: none

Summary
- Airport type: Private (closed)
- Owner: Reid, Lehman families
- Location: Fairfax County, Virginia
- Elevation AMSL: 249 ft (76 m)
- Coordinates: 38°46′20″N 077°05′00″W
- Interactive map of Beacon Field Airport

Runways
Direction	Length		Surface
Direction	ft	m	Surface
?	2,313	705	Macadam
?	~2,000	~600	?
- Source: ,

Beacon Field Airport was an airport located in the Groveton area of Fairfax County, Virginia, United States, from the 1920s until its closure in 1959. One of the nation's earliest private airports, and particularly in the Washington DC Metropolitan Area, it received its name because it was the location of an airway beacon used to guide early airmail pilots. It later became a popular training site, complete with FBO, for pilots learning to fly after World War II on the G.I. Bill.

The site, originally an antebellum estate called City View, is now the location of a shopping center.

== See also ==
- Washington-Virginia Airport, a prominent, privately owned and operated airport in the Washington D.C. area from 1947 to 1970
