= Bailey's Crossroads, Virginia =

- Census-designated place (CDP)
- Location of Bailey's Crossroads in Fairfax County, Virginia

- Location within Northern Virginia Location within Virginia Location within the United States
- Coordinates: 38°50′58″N 77°7′45″W
- Country: United States
- State: Virginia
- County: Fairfax

Area
  - Total: 2.05 sq mi (5.31 km^{2})
  - Land: 2.05 sq mi (5.31 km^{2})
  - Water: 0 sq mi (0.0 km^{2})
- Elevation: 256 ft (78 m)

Population (2020)
  - Total: 24,749
  - Density: 12,100/sq mi (4,660/km^{2})
- Time zone: UTC−5 (Eastern (EST))
  - Summer (DST): UTC−4 (EDT)
- ZIP code: 22041
- Area code: 703
- FIPS code: 51-04088
- GNIS feature ID: 1492501

Bailey's Crossroads is a census-designated place (CDP) in Fairfax County, Virginia, United States. The population was 24,749 at the 2020 census. Bailey's Crossroads lies at the crossroads of State Route 7 (Leesburg Pike) and State Route 244 (Columbia Pike).

== Etymology ==
Bailey's Crossroads draws its name from the Bailey family of circus fame, which has long been connected with the community. Hachaliah Bailey, one of America's first circus showmen, resided here.

In 1808, while still in New York state, he purchased an Indian elephant which was one of the first such animals to reach the United States. Seeking a place to winter his circus animals, he moved to Virginia, and on December 19, 1837, he bought a tract of land on the outskirts of Falls Church including what is now the intersection of Leesburg Pike and Columbia Pike. On this tract he built a large house known as "Bailey's Mansion" or "Moray". It was reputed to have contained 100 rooms. The mansion sat at a location now known as Durbin Place. It abutted Glenforest Drive, the oldest outlet road to Leesburg Pike.

Circuses were part of the Bailey family business. Hachaliah's son Lewis Bailey (1795–1870) operated a travelling circus and pioneered the use of canvas circus tents before eventually settling in 1840 to farm land in Bailey's Crossroads. Hachaliah's nephew George F. Bailey managed several shows, too, designing a tank in which a hippopotamus could be moved from place to place. Another nephew, Fred Harrison Bailey, recognized a potential circus talent in James Anthony McGuiness, later James Anthony Bailey, who united the Cooper and Bailey operations with Phineas Taylor Barnum's circus to form the Barnum and Bailey Circus, which later joined with the Ringling Brothers Circus to form the Ringling Brothers and Barnum and Bailey Circus.

Perhaps the first of the Northerners to settle permanently in Fairfax County to farm was Lewis Bailey, an upstate New Yorker and the son of Hachaliah Bailey, who followed his father south.

In 1837, the elder Bailey bought hundreds of acres of Fairfax land, much of it on the outskirts of present-day Arlington County in the area now known as Bailey's Cross Roads. Shortly afterward, Lewis Bailey bought 150 acres (0.61 km^{2}) of land from his father for ten dollars an acre. Included in the purchase was "a good dwelling-house," but there were "no other buildings of value, and little or no fence." The farm itself, he wrote later, consisted of "cultivated worn-out lands, too poor to produce a crop of grass, or pay for cultivation without manure." Some of Bailey's neighbors considered the farm the poorest in the vicinity. When he built his first small barn, twenty-four by thirty-six feet, they asked him if he "ever expected to fill it." The question was scarcely a jest, for Bailey did not make enough hay the first year "to winter two horses." Nevertheless, the purchase was a wise one. Within a decade Bailey had a fine herd of dairy cattle and had become one of the more prosperous farmers in the area. The Baileys were prominent members of the Dulin Methodist Church, and intermarried with many Falls Church people.

== History ==
=== 19th century ===
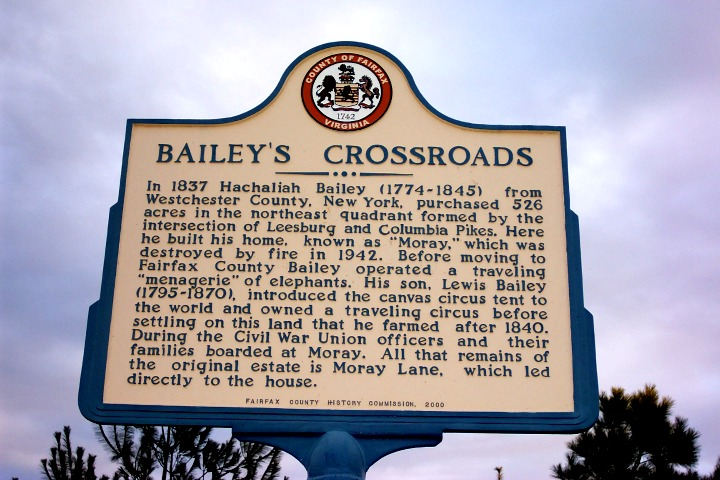
A historical marker in Bailey's Crossroads

Hachaliah Bailey, the founder of one of America's earliest circuses, which in time evolved into the Bailey component of what became the Ringling Bros. and Barnum & Bailey Circus, moved to Northern Virginia in 1837, bought the land surrounding the intersection of Leesburg Pike and Columbia Pike in Fairfax County, near Falls Church, and gave Bailey's Crossroads his name. The Crossroads then became the winter quarters for his circus.

==== Civil War ====
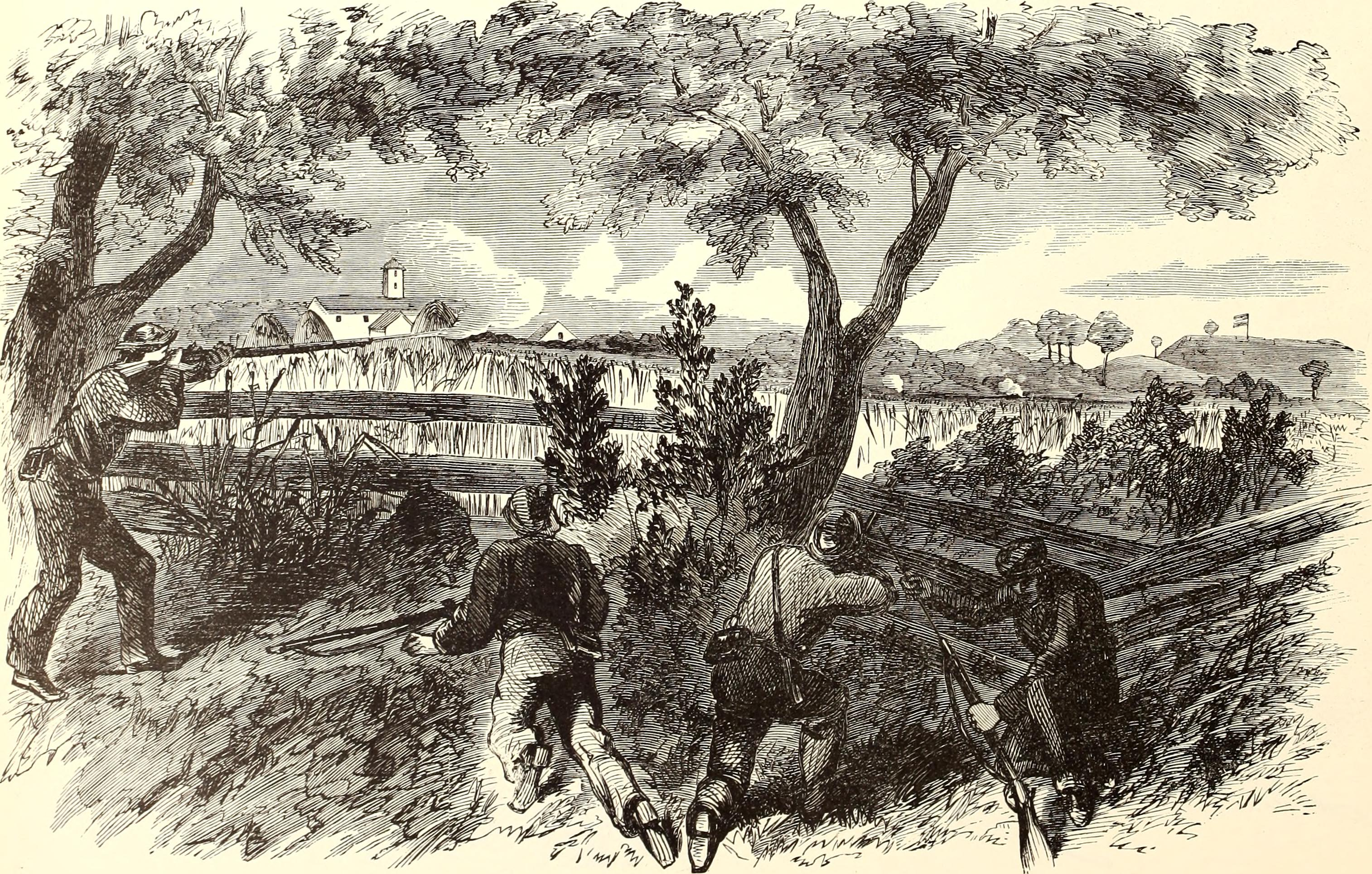
Munson's Hill and Bailey's Crossroads during the American Civil War

The opening months of the American Civil War proved to be a disruptive and unforgettable episode in the history of Bailey's Crossroads. From the summer of 1861, when the area fell into an uncomfortable and poorly defined "no man's land" between the borders of two warring countries, until late November of that year, when the area hosted a massive troop review, anything akin to normalcy was in short supply.

Virginia voted to secede from the Union on May 23, 1861. Fairfax County's northern-born residents—many of whom were its most prominent and prosperous citizens—now felt very uncomfortable. Their southern neighbors looked upon them with suspicion. In July 1861 the Union Army met with catastrophic defeat during the First Battle of Manassas. The army retreated all the way to Washington, with the Confederate Army advancing quickly behind it. The Confederates occupied Falls Church and Munson's Hill, overlooking Bailey's Crossroads, and the crossroads' northern-born residents fled for the safety of Washington.

Once Confederates established themselves atop Munson's Hill they built a crude fort there, and from these commanding heights turned Bailey's Crossroads into a "killing field". Southern sharpshooters killed numerous Union soldiers. Violence arose whenever Confederate and Union pickets, or scouts, engaged one another in firefights. It was now impossible to walk the Leesburg Pike without being shot and killed.

There was a minor engagement between the sides on September 3, 1861, with the Union suffering eight casualties and the Confederates none.

Official reports on the 'War of the Rebellion' indicate that during August 28–30, 1861 a series of skirmishes took place at a location scrawled as "Balley's Cross Roads".

The local balance of power changed completely—and to everyone's surprise—on September 28, 1861, as the Confederate Army silently withdrew its forces from Munson's Hill, Upton's Hill and Falls Church to Manassas, which they fortified. Munson's Hill and Falls Church were located too far afield of reliable supply lines, and a concerted Union pincer movement could possibly choke off supplies, the Southern command believed. At Manassas they were adjacent to Virginia's interior, and had good railroad and road connections to it.

After Confederate withdrawal the area quickly was reoccupied by Union troops. A significant troop review took place at Bailey's Crossroads on November 20, 1861. Thousands of Union troops marched in formation and paraded before President Abraham Lincoln, the northern press, and many onlookers from Washington. Army commanders selected Bailey's Crossroads as the site because of its nature as a large, unbroken plain. In order to prepare it for the day's activities the army merely needed to remove the split-rail fencing separating farms and fields.

Contemporary local historians have confused this review with another, smaller review held on nearby Upton's Hill, where events spurred the composition and publication of the "Battle Hymn of the Republic".

=== 20th century ===
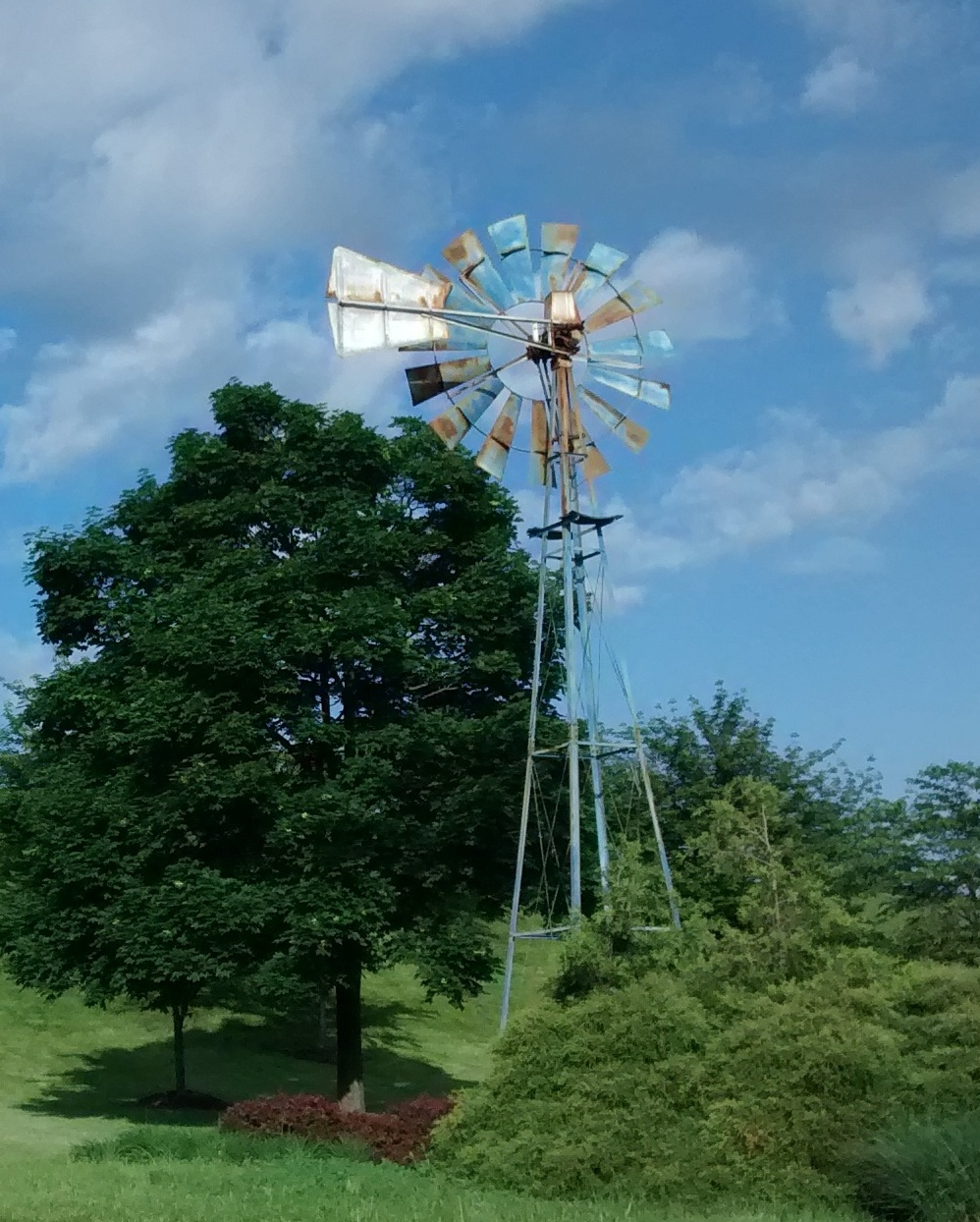
Bailey's Crossroads windmill

After the Civil War Bailey's Crossroads returned to its pastoral pre-war pursuits. The area remained a rural farming community until the post-World War II years, when a massive wave of development occurred. Leesburg Pike is now a commercial corridor, with apartments and homes to its north and south. A strip shopping center called Culmore, in particular, has lent its name to the apartment development behind it, which is now home to several thousand Latino immigrants. "Culmore" is now an established place name within Bailey's Crossroads. Close behind Culmore is Lake Barcroft, whose shore is lined with upscale middle-class homes.

During the 1960s, as Washington's Metro system was being conceived, original plans called for a subway line to extend under Columbia Pike to and through Bailey's Crossroads. As a result of the plan a massive highrise complex was built on the former Washington-Virginia Airport in the heart of Bailey's Crossroads called Skyline City. Its location coincided with the planned locations of Metro stations. Plans for the Metro, however, changed. The western line was placed along the I-66 corridor instead.

== Geography ==
Places in Bailey's Crossroads

Bailey's Crossroads is located at 38°50′58″N 77°7′45″W (38.849474, -77.129093).

According to the United States Census Bureau, the CDP has a total area of 2.0 square miles (5.3 km^{2}), all land. The area occupies a broad, flat plain, bounded on the west by Munson's Hill. This unbroken expanse of level ground caused the Union Army to select it as the site of a massive review of troops during the Civil War. The review, which took place on November 20, 1861, involved thousands of troops marching in formation and parading before President Abraham Lincoln.

Bailey's Crossroads is formed by the junction of State Route 7 (King Street in Alexandria and Leesburg Pike through Fairfax and Loudoun Counties) connecting Alexandria, Virginia with the Shenandoah Valley and State Route 244 (Columbia Pike) connecting the Pentagon and Washington, D.C., with Annandale, Virginia. The most noticeable landmark at Bailey's Crossroads is Skyline Center, a towering group of 26-story apartment buildings and offices built in the 1970s. A branch of Northern Virginia Community College, and offices of the U.S. Department of Defense are nearby. The neighborhood has a large Hispanic population. The largest single store of the entire Giant Food supermarket chain is also there. While the closest Metrorail station is a few miles away, Metrobus service on the Columbia Pike corridor has recently been improved.

The precise extent of Bailey's Crossroads has never been defined. As an unincorporated community without local government, it has never had the purview to do so. The United States Census Bureau observes one definition; and various parts of the Fairfax County government observe others. Economic development plans tend to include just the commercial corridors and associated areas. Current discussions among the Fairfax County government for revitalizing Bailey's Crossroads economically concern themselves with the Fairfax County border on the north and east—which generally includes all commercial and residential properties generally considered as belonging to the neighborhood—as well as Seminary Road and Carlin Spring Road. The plans include a narrow strip along Leesburg Pike to Glen Carlyn Road.

As a general neighborhood, however, with all facets of life included, the geographic extent of Bailey's Crossroads must be considered to be larger. It abuts the clearly established Lake Barcroft neighborhood on the southwest, with Blair Road, Beachway Drive, Nevius Street and Mansfield Road marking its western proximity. North of Leesburg Pike its extent is generally defined by Glen Carlyn and Carlin Springs roads.

== Governance ==
Fairfax County Public Schools operates public schools. Glen Forest Elementary School is the primary school attended by most children living in the area, and the local schools feed Justice High School.

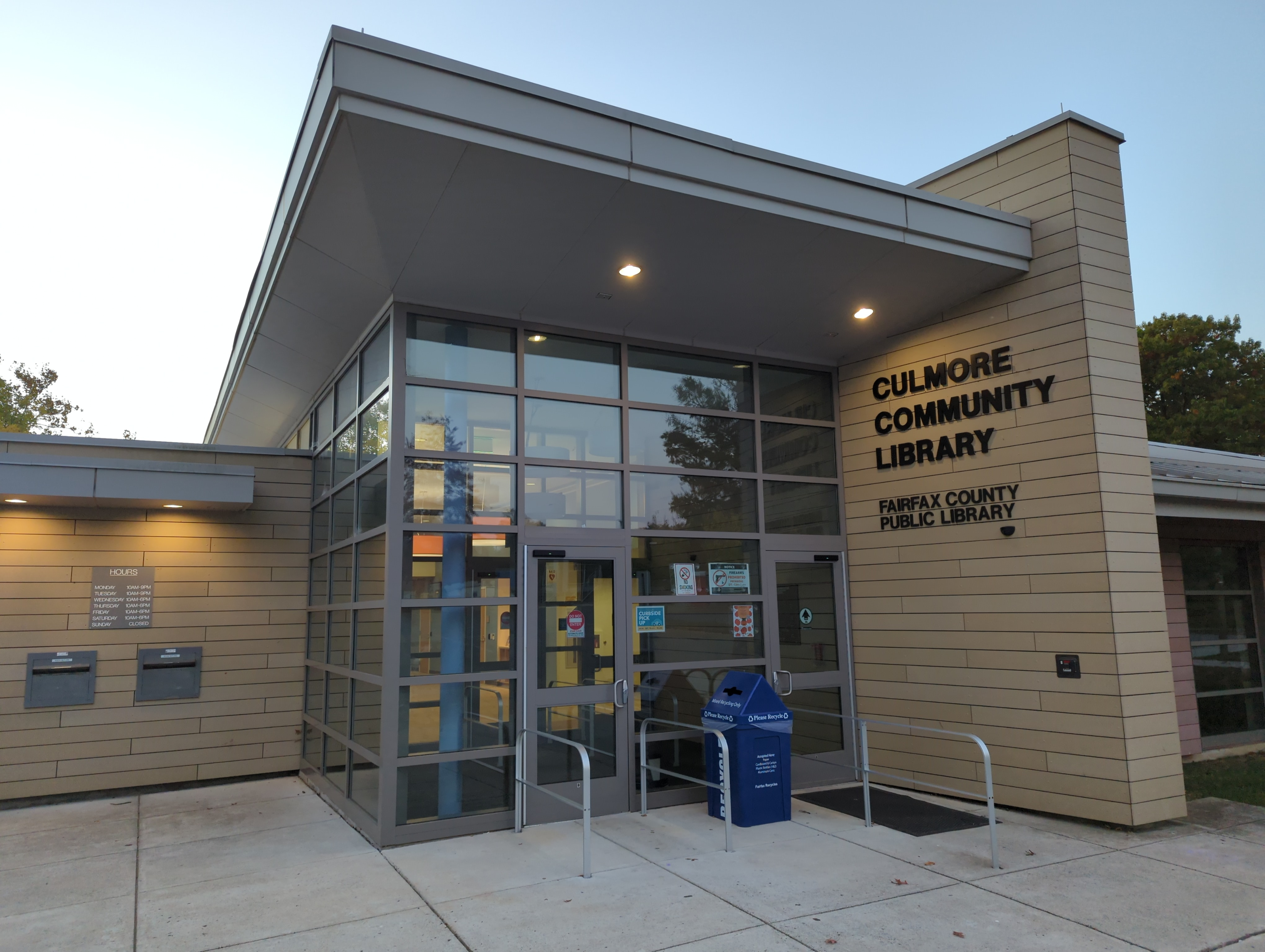
Culmore Community Library

Fairfax County Public Library operates the Culmore Community Library in the Culmore area. It has Spanish-language materials in addition to English-language ones.

A United States Post Office, located in Culmore, serves the Bailey's Crossroads ZIP code of 22041. Although, the United States Postal Service uses "Falls Church" as the primary name of the ZIP code, mail can also be addressed using "Bailey's Crossroads", as many businesses and residents do to prevent confusion with services, deliveries, customers and guests. The State of Virginia and Fairfax County, Virginia recognize "Bailey's Crossroads" as a valid address for official documents such as property deed, vehicle registration, drivers license and other business.

In 2010, the Bailey's Crossroads Volunteer Fire Department turned the land, the firehouse, and most of the equipment of Fire Station 10 over to the Fairfax County Fire & Rescue Department in exchange for a new facility. Since then, Fire Station 10 has been maintained and operated by the Fairfax County Fire & Rescue Department and is staffed 24/7 by full-time career firefighters and paramedics. The Bailey's Crossroads Volunteer firefighters still own the three medic units housed at the station - the two front line units are maintained and operated by Fairfax County Fire & Rescue, while the third unit is maintained and operated by the volunteers.

== Demographics ==
Historical population
Census	Pop.	Note	%±
1970	7,295		—
1980	12,564		72.2%
1990	19,507		55.3%
2000	23,166		18.8%
2010	23,643		2.1%
2020	24,749		4.7%
U.S. Decennial Census; 1940 1950 1960 1970; 1980 1990 2000; 2010

=== Racial and ethnic composition ===
Bailey's Crossroads CDP, Virginia – Racial and ethnic composition Note: the US Census treats Hispanic/Latino as an ethnic category. This table excludes Latinos from the racial categories and assigns them to a separate category. Hispanics/Latinos may be of any race.
Race / Ethnicity (NH = Non-Hispanic)	Pop 2000	Pop 2010	Pop 2020	% 2000	% 2010	% 2020
White alone (NH)	7,741	7,736	7,026	33.42%	32.72%	28.39%
Black or African American alone (NH)	2,391	3,475	3,917	10.32%	14.70%	15.83%
Native American or Alaska Native alone (NH)	65	42	42	0.28%	0.18%	0.17%
Asian alone (NH)	2,847	2,445	3,210	12.29%	10.34%	12.97%
Native Hawaiian or Pacific Islander alone (NH)	21	24	4	0.09%	0.10%	0.02%
Other race alone (NH)	102	97	191	0.44%	0.41%	0.77%
Mixed race or Multiracial (NH)	1,403	488	911	6.06%	2.06%	3.68%
Hispanic or Latino (any race)	8,596	9,336	9,448	37.11%	39.49%	38.18%
Total	23,166	23,643	24,749	100.00%	100.00%	100.00%

=== 2020 census ===
As of the 2020 census, Bailey's Crossroads had a population of 24,749. The median age was 35.4 years. 24.0% of residents were under the age of 18 and 13.9% of residents were 65 years of age or older. For every 100 females there were 97.4 males, and for every 100 females age 18 and over there were 95.0 males age 18 and over. The population density was 12,072.7 inhabitants per square mile (4,660.8/km^{2}), and the average housing unit density was 4,778.5 per square mile (1,844.8/km^{2}).

100.0% of residents lived in urban areas, while 0.0% lived in rural areas.

There were 9,389 households in Bailey's Crossroads, of which 32.3% had children under the age of 18 living in them. Of all households, 38.7% were married-couple households, 22.5% were households with a male householder and no spouse or partner present, and 33.0% were households with a female householder and no spouse or partner present. About 34.3% of all households were made up of individuals and 14.0% had someone living alone who was 65 years of age or older.

There were 9,796 housing units, of which 4.2% were vacant. The homeowner vacancy rate was 0.5% and the rental vacancy rate was 4.5%.

Racial composition as of the 2020 census
Race	Number	Percent
White	7,810	31.6%
Black or African American	3,987	16.1%
American Indian and Alaska Native	655	2.6%
Asian	3,221	13.0%
Native Hawaiian and Other Pacific Islander	4	0.0%
Some other race	6,044	24.4%
Two or more races	3,028	12.2%

=== American Community Survey ===
According to the 2022 American Community Survey, of the family households, 36.4% were married couples, 22.7% were a male householder with no spouse, and 32.1% were a female householder with no spouse. The average family household had 3.5 people.

The largest ancestry is the 12.1% who had Subsaharan African ancestry, 61.9% spoke a language other than English at home, and 49.0% were born outside the United States, 40.5% of whom were naturalized citizens.

The median income for a household in the CDP was $78,286, and the median income for a family was $75,948. 5.2% of the population were military veterans, and 43.5% had a Bachelor's degree or higher. In the CDP, 21.3% of the population was below the poverty line, including 35.2% of those under age 18 and 12.8% of those age 65 or over, with 22.4% of the population without health insurance.

== In popular culture ==
- Bailey's Crossroads is featured in The Man in the High Castle.

== Notable people ==
- Charlie Garner, former American football player
- Penny Moore, former WNBA player, Charlotte Sting and Washington Mystics
- Franz Stahl and Pete Stahl, punk rock musicians

== See also ==
- Skyline Towers collapse
- Washington-Virginia Airport
