= Warrenton–Fauquier Airport =

Airport in Virginia, United States

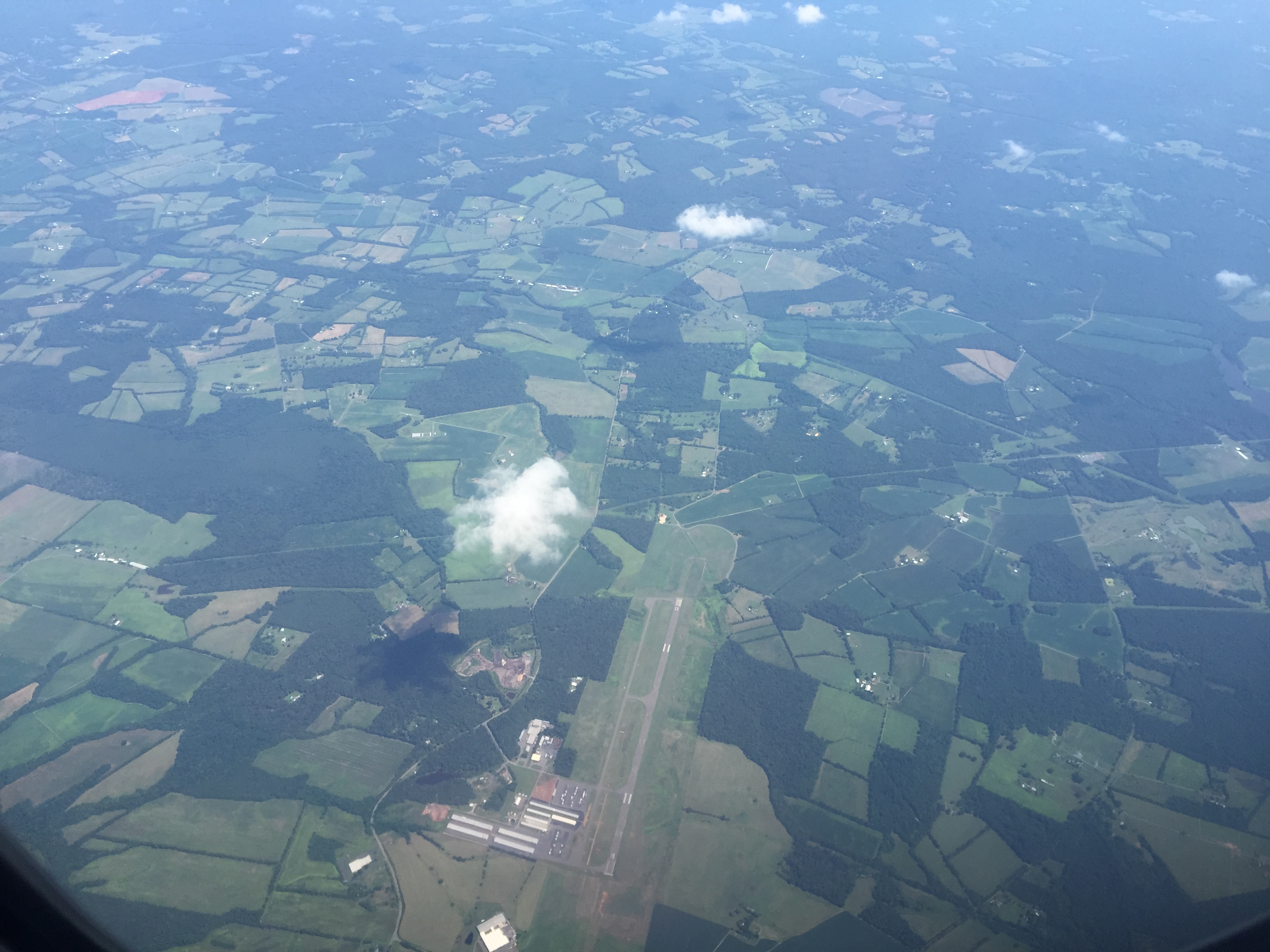
- IATA: none; ICAO: KHWY; FAA LID: HWY

Summary
- Airport type: Public
- Owner: Fauquier County
- Serves: Warrenton, Virginia
- Elevation AMSL: 336 ft / 102 m
- Coordinates: 38°35′11″N 077°42′38″W

Map

Runways
Direction	Length		Surface
Direction	ft	m	Surface
15/33	5,000	1,524	Asphalt

Statistics (2007)
- Aircraft operations: 42,184
- Based aircraft: 119
- Source: Federal Aviation Administration

Warrenton–Fauquier Airport (ICAO: KHWY, FAA LID: HWY, formerly W66) is a public airport 14 miles southeast of Warrenton, a town in Fauquier County, Virginia.

Most U.S. airports use the same three-letter location identifier for the FAA and IATA, but this airport is HWY to the FAA and has no IATA code.

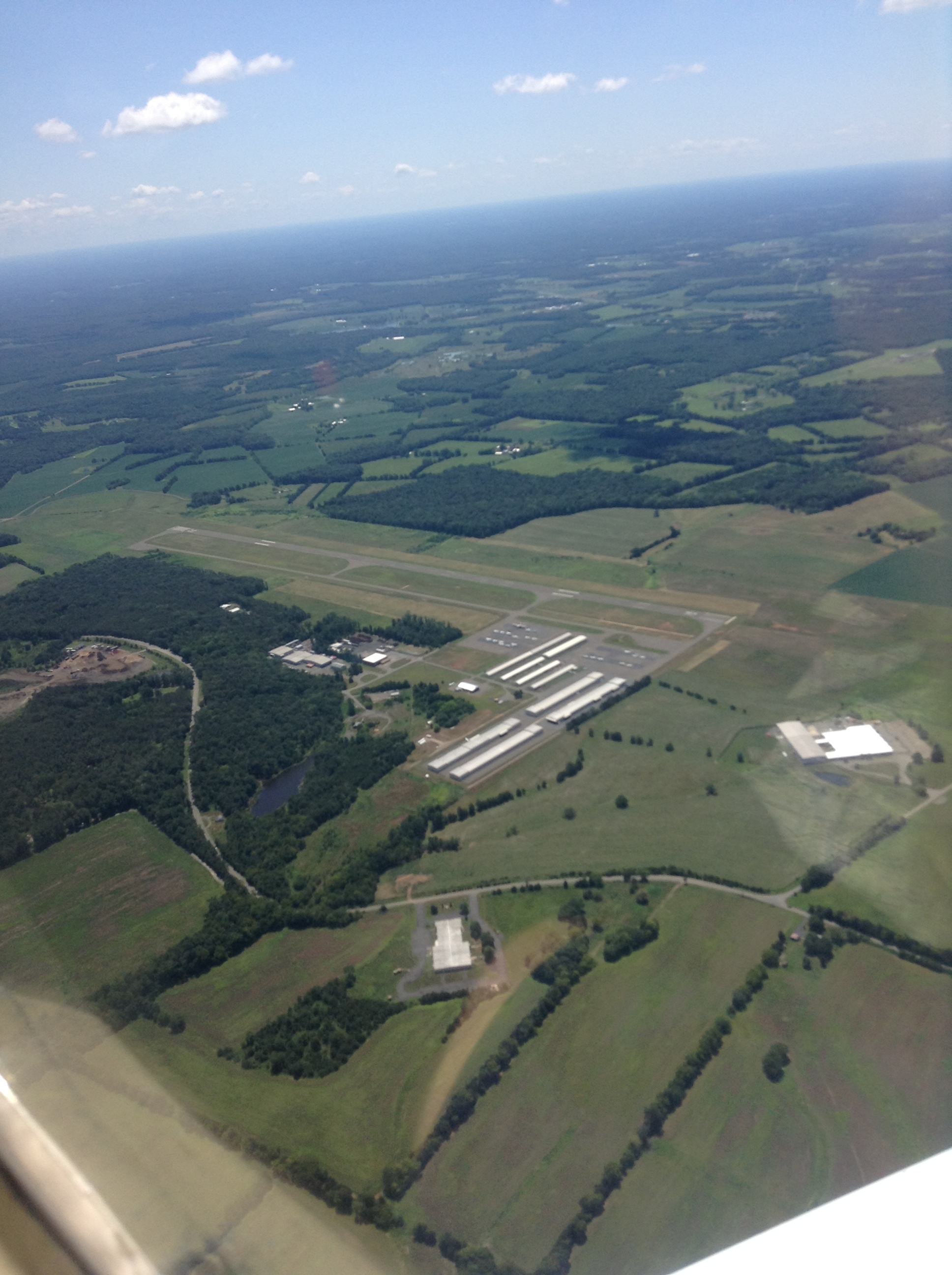
Warrenton Airport, August 2015

== Facilities ==
Warrenton–Fauquier Airport covers 407 acres (165 ha) at an elevation of 336 feet (102 m). Its single runway, 15/33, is 5,000 by 100 feet (1,524 m × 30 m) asphalt.

In the year ending June 29, 2007 the airport had 42,184 aircraft operations, average 115 per day: 98% general aviation, 1% air taxi and <1% military. 119 aircraft were then based at this airport: 84% single-engine (100), 13% multi-engine, 3% ultralight and 1% helicopter.

== Accidents and incidents ==
On December 3, 2023, a 62-year-old pilot was killed while piloting a Beechcraft C23 aircraft when it collided with several trees while attempting to land at the airport. The aircraft had no other occupants other than the pilot, and no one was injured on the ground.

== See also ==
- List of airports in Virginia
