= Weirwood, Virginia =

Unincorporated community in Virginia, US

Coordinates: 37°27′25″N 75°52′11″W

Weirwood is an unincorporated community in Northampton County, Virginia, United States, located on Virginia's Eastern Shore

== Transportation ==
The hamlet and surrounding area are served by Campbell Field Airport.

Eastern Shore Adventure Sports, Inc. operates the Eastern Shore Hang Gliding Center at Campbell Field Airport in Weirwood. There is hang glider traffic within the vicinity of Campbell Field Airport, especially on weekends.
