= Washington-Virginia Airport =

Former airport located in Fairfax County, Virginia

Washington-Virginia Airport (closed)
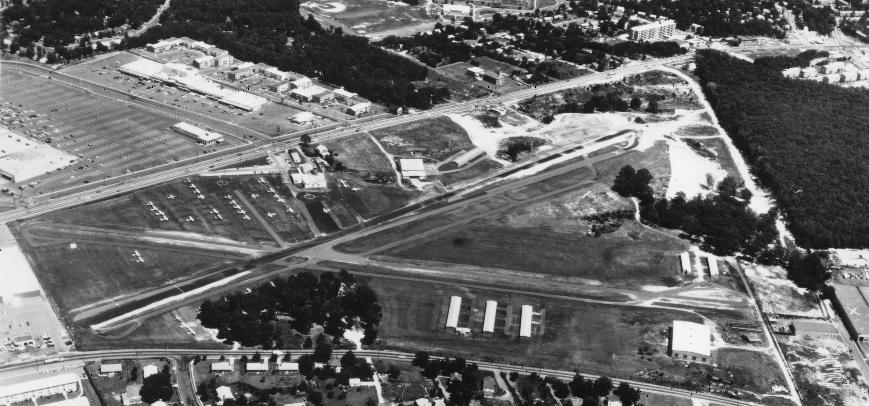
- Aerial view of Washington-Virginia Airport, c. 1970
- IATA: WVA; ICAO: none; FAA LID: 204552

Summary
- Airport type: Commercial, general aviation
- Owner: John D. and Charles D. Benn
- Operator: Washington-Virginia Flight Services, Inc.
- Serves: Washington D.C. and Northern Virginia
- Location: Bailey's Crossroads, Virginia, U.S.
- Coordinates: 38°50′42″N 077°7′15.6″W

Map
- Location of Washington-Virginia Airport in Northern Virginia (Virginia) (the United States)

Runways
Direction	Length		Surface
Direction	ft	m	Surface
12/30	2,800	853	originally built as gravel; paved in the early 1960s
17/35	2,200	671	originally built as gravel; paved in the early 1960s

Washington-Virginia Airport was an airport that was located in Fairfax County, Virginia, United States from 1947 (79 years ago) to 1970; 56 years ago. The airport was mainly used for general aviation purposes until encroaching residential and commercial activities forced its closure.

== Key personnel ==
- Charles Douglas Benn. Benn served in the Army Air Forces as a flight engineer on B-17 aircraft during World War II. Along with his brother, John D. Benn, he helped develop and operate the Washington-Virginia Airport. Benn was also a Piper Aircraft dealer and owned one of Virginia's largest flight schools. He later developed the Woodbridge, Virginia Airport and managed it until his retirement in 1987. In 1989, Benn was elected to the Hall of Fame of the Virginia Aeronautical Society in recognition of "his distinguished contribution to the progress of aviation." Benn died at the age of 83 on September 1, 2004 in Salem, Virginia.
- John D. Benn. Benn purchased the Bailey's Crossroads Airport 1946. He operated the airport and its many activities until he died on December 1, 1967. During a December 14, 1987 ceremony, the Virginia Aviation Museum dedicated its theater to Benn.
- John D. Benn Jr. A retired US Air pilot, he was the son of John D. Benn who along with his brother, Charles Benn, developed and operated the Washington-Virginia Airport. After his father's death in 1967, John D. Benn Jr. served as president of the airport and negotiated the eventual sale of the airport and subsequent development as the Skyline Center. Benn died at the age of 68 on January 1, 2000.

== History and usage ==
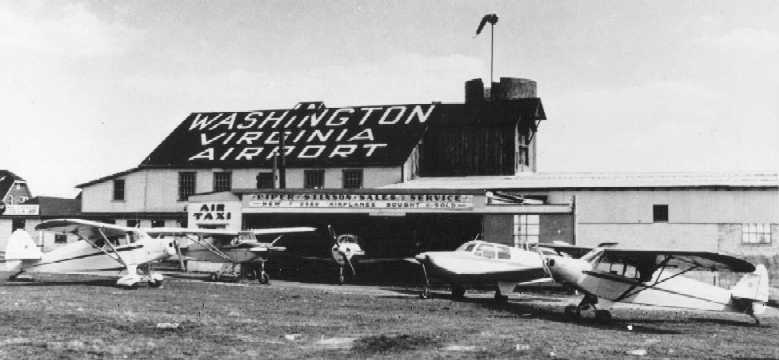
The main hangar at the Washington-Virginia Airport

The Washington-Virginia Airport was originally known as "Crossroads Airport". Work on the airport began in the Bailey's Crossroads area of Fairfax County in the early 1940s but was delayed because of World War II. The airport's first appearance on an aeronautical sectional chart was in 1945 when it was displayed as a commercial airport with the name "Crossroads." In the following year, John D. Benn Jr., and his brother Charles Benn purchased the airport from E.C. Germain of Washington Air Charter Service and applied to the Virginia State Corporation Commission, Division of Aeronautics, for a license to operate a commercial airport as "Bailey's Crossroads Airport". Their application was heard and approved on May 16, 1946.

The airport featured two graveled runways, a north–south runway measuring 2,200 feet and a second, longer runway that ran east–west and measured 2,800 feet. During the late 1940s, the Benn brothers opened a flight school that included 10 Piper J-3 Cubs, two Cessna 120s, a Cessna 140, a Fairchild PT-19 and a Cessna UC-78 Bobcat in its inventory. The airport also had multiple hangars and administrative offices. By 1949, the airport was considered as one of the busiest general aviation airports in the Washington D.C. metropolitan area and attracted a number of airshows and events.

The airport's proximity to The Pentagon resulted in the facility hosting a number of military aviation demonstrations and displays, to include a flight demonstration of the Piper PA-18, the Aérospatiale Alouette helicopter, the OV-10 Bronco, the de Havilland Caribou, and the McDonnell Douglas Short Takeoff and Landing (STOL) aircraft. In addition to general aviation, military displays and flight training, the airport hosted other activities during its time in service, to include the following:

- 1949: Connie B. Gay's "Hillbilly Airshow" that featured country music singing stars and a North Carolina air circus, complete with acrobatic planes and airplane wing walkers
- 1954: Northern Virginia Fair. A Washington Post article characterized the fair as having an exhibit of special interest to women as it included knitting, sewing, and crocheting demonstrations as well as an array of canned and baked goods.

As the 1960s progressed, increased urbanization led to the closure of other general aviation airports in the Washington D.C area to include Beacon Field Airport in nearby Alexandria, Virginia. The closure of that facility resulted in many of its aircraft relocating to the Washington-Virginia Airport. By the mid-1960s over 100 aircraft were housed in Washington-Virginia's hangars or on the fields adjacent to the runways. A 1968 Aircraft Owners and Pilots Association airport directory said that the airport offered fuel, repairs, hangar, flight instruction, and charter services and that bus, taxi, rental cars, food and lodging were also available. The airport's manager was listed as Charles D. Benn. The directory also stated that the airport had only one runway in use (12/30) as the north–south runway (17/35) had been closed at the request of the state for safety reasons.

== Special restrictions ==
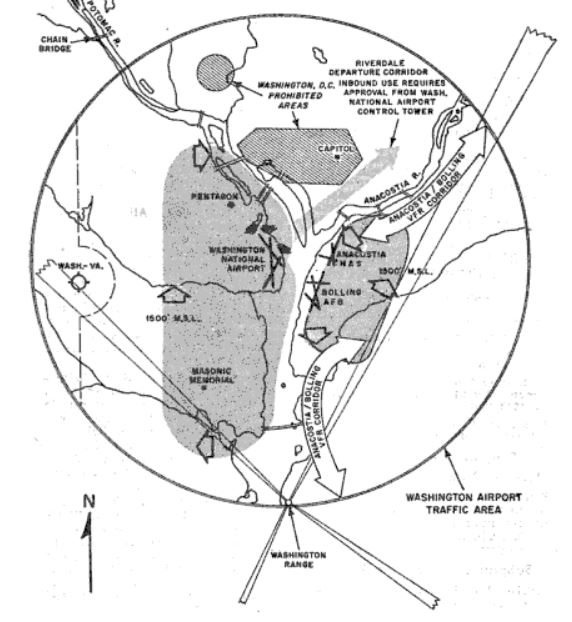
Washington metropolitan area airports with the Washington-Virginia Airport (on left) and showing the one-mile lateral area around the airport

Crowded airspace in the Washington DC area resulted in the Federal Aviation Agency establishing special flight restrictions which were published in the 1961 Code of Federal Regulations as part of Title 14 – Aeronautics and Space. Specific instructions for the Washington-Virginia Airport included the following:

Washington-Virginia Airport. All aircraft landing at Washington-Virginia Airport shall be flown as to enter the airspace of the Washington National Airport Traffic Area at an altitude of not above 1,200 feet m.s.l. and west of an imaginary line extending north and south through the center of Washington-Virginia Airport. After entry into the Washington National Airport Traffic Area, such aircraft shall not be flown above an altitude of 1,200 m.s.l. and beyond one-mile from the boundary of the Washington-Virginia Airport, when operating east of the imaginary north south line … aircraft taking off … shall be flown so as to remain within a one-mile lateral distance of the airport boundary of the Washington-Virginia Airport until west of the imaginary north-south line extending through the center of the airport and … shall be flown at an altitude not above 1,200 feet m.s.l. until clear of the Washington National Airport Traffic Area.

== Accidents ==
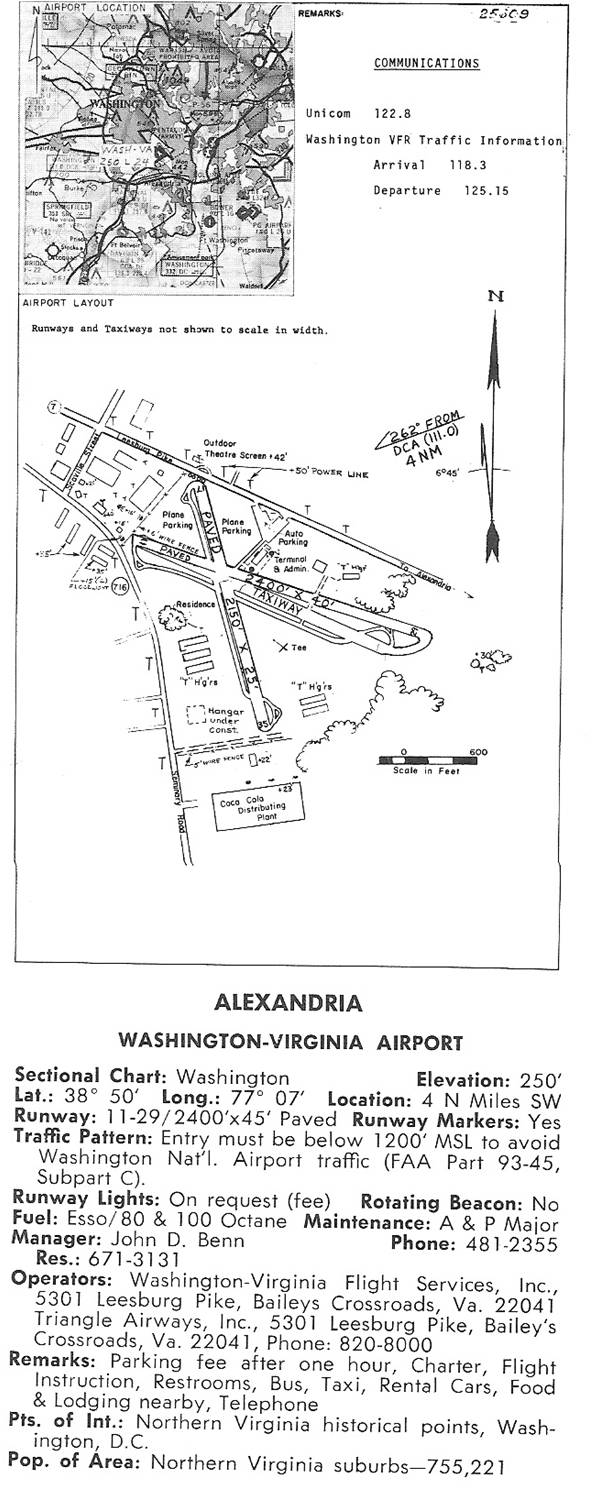
The 1970-1971 Virginia State Airport Directory sketch of the airport showing the location of both the 42' tall movie screen across Route 7 from the 17/35 runway and the 50' tall power line on the opposite side of the road

The airport was the site of numerous accidents and mishaps, none of which were fatal. Many of the accidents were caused by the congested development around the airport. The placement of the 42' outdoor movie screen of the Sunset Drive-In on the other side of Virginia Route 7 was directly in the path of planes attempting to land in the 17/35 runway. On one landing attempt, a "tail-dragger" struck the object with its rear wheel and reportedly left a large black skid mark on the top of the screen. Also adjacent to the airport was a large Coca-Cola bottling plant that, at least on one occasion, was mistaken at night for a landing strip, causing the plant's owners to place a large white "X" on the building's roof in an attempt to dissuade pilots from landing on it. On another occasion, the airport hosted planes that were visually modified to look like Japanese Zeros for use in the movie Tora! Tora! Tora! Two of the planes collided on the ground resulting in the loss of a wing. Other notable accidents include the following:

- 1950: Engine failure after take-off. Alvin P. Hines, 48, of Arlington County, was piloting a Piper Cub when the engine failed seconds after take-off. Hines estimated his altitude at approximately 150' when the engine stopped. Hines flew the plane into an area of brush and undergrowth south of Seminary Road. Along with his two passengers, eight-year-old Bill MacConnaughey of Woodbridge, Virginia and 19-year-old Mary Ann King of Rescue, Virginia, Hines walked out of the aircraft uninjured. The aircraft suffered bent landing gear, and a damaged fuselage. Hines attributed the engine failure to a clogged fuel line.
- 1955: Plane strikes trees while attempting to land. Charles Benn of Arlington County and the owner of the Washington-Virginia Airport, along with a passenger, Alfred T. Vest also of Arlington County, received minor injuries when their plane crashed just short of the runway.
- 1964: Plane strikes trees while attempting to land. Christian Liechpy, a 23-year-old student pilot was blinded by lights along Route 7 as he was attempting to make a night landing. His plane, a single engine Ercoupe, struck a tree top and crashed in the Coca-Cola bottling plant parking lot adjacent to the airport. Liechpy was uninjured, but his passenger, 24-year-old Anthony Spiritosanto suffered two leg fractures. Both men lived in Arlington County, Virginia.
- 1967. Unknown cause. Roy McCabe of Woodbridge was seriously injured when he crashed his Cessna 140 aircraft shortly after takeoff from the airport. The July 27, 1967 crash occurred about 1000’ feet from the airport and resulted in several damaged cars on Leesburg Pike.
- 1969: Private pilot loses control on take-off. Windy conditions caused a pilot to lose control of his plane as he was departing the airport. In an attempt to avoid a hangar at the end of the runway, the pilot, Thomas R. O'Pray of Arlington County, pulled up sharply, stalled the plane and crashed into the hangar he was trying to avoid. The 29-year-old pilot and his 16-year-old passenger, Dwain E. Bryant of Takoma Park, Maryland, received minor injuries. The four seat Stinson aircraft suffered considerable damage.
- 1970: Plane strikes power lines while attempting to land. A Piper Cherokee was destroyed and its two occupants seriously injured when the plane struck a 34,000 volt power line while descending to land at the airport. The two occupants were 46-year-old Daniel C. White and 36-year-old James M. Robinson, both of Arlington County. The power line fell onto a metal fence surrounding the airport and electrified it, starting numerous brush fires that forced the Virginia State Police to close Route 7. Businesses and homes in the area lost power for several hours as a result of the accident.

== Closure and aftermath ==
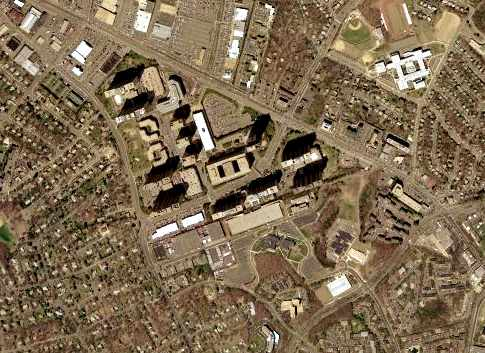
The Skyline Center was constructed on the site of the Washington-Virginia Airport in the 1970s.

Complaints about the Washington-Virginia Airport dated back to the early 1950s when Marshall J. Beverley, the mayor of Alexandria, characterized the airport as a "menace" that was "constantly terrorizing the inhabitants of [the] city." Beverley lodged complaints with the Virginia State Aeronautics Division claiming that pilots using the airport were violating minimum altitude requirements and were flying less than 50 feet over cars on Route 7 while they were attempting to land. Beverley also directed that the Alexandria Police department monitor traffic at the airport which was located on the border of Alexandria City and Fairfax County, and arrest pilots who violated airspace rules.

By the late 1960s, the Washington-Virginia Airport faced the same problems many general aviation airports across the country faced: increasing real estate prices, high taxes, costly liability insurance and public opposition to aviation activity located in what had become, over time, a residential area. John D. Benn had voiced concerns about encroachment as far back as 1959 when he told The Washington Post that the farmland surrounding the airport that had been converted to commercial and residential areas posed a threat to safe airport operations. In the same interview Benn also mentioned that the value of the 106-acre airport had increased to over $1 million since he opened it for business in 1949.

Following Benn's death in 1967, interest in re-purposing the Washington-Virginia began in earnest. In 1968 John D. Benn Jr. announced that he was in discussions with the Charles E. Smith Companies, a Washington D.C. area real estate developer, to convert the airport to an office complex. Earlier in the decade, Smith had converted a large underutilized area of Arlington County into a $120 million complex of offices and high-rise residential buildings called Crystal City. Benn stated that a similar development would be constructed at the location of the airport. Plans were finalized a year later when the Benn family sold the airport to the Smith Companies, who announced plans to construct a $200 million office, retail and residential complex that would feature eight apartment buildings and underground parking for over 11,000 cars. The airport closed on October 18, 1970.

Work on what was named the "Skyline Center" started in 1971 and continued until 1973 when it was halted by the collapse of the 26-floor "Skyline Plaza" apartment building. The accident took the lives of 14 construction workers and injured 35 others. The Washington-Virginia Airport, considered a danger to the public, had never experienced a fatal accident. Further work on the construction project was suspended until 1974 while the cause of the collapse was being investigated.

The Skyline Center complex was completed in 1977.
