= Campbell Field Airport =

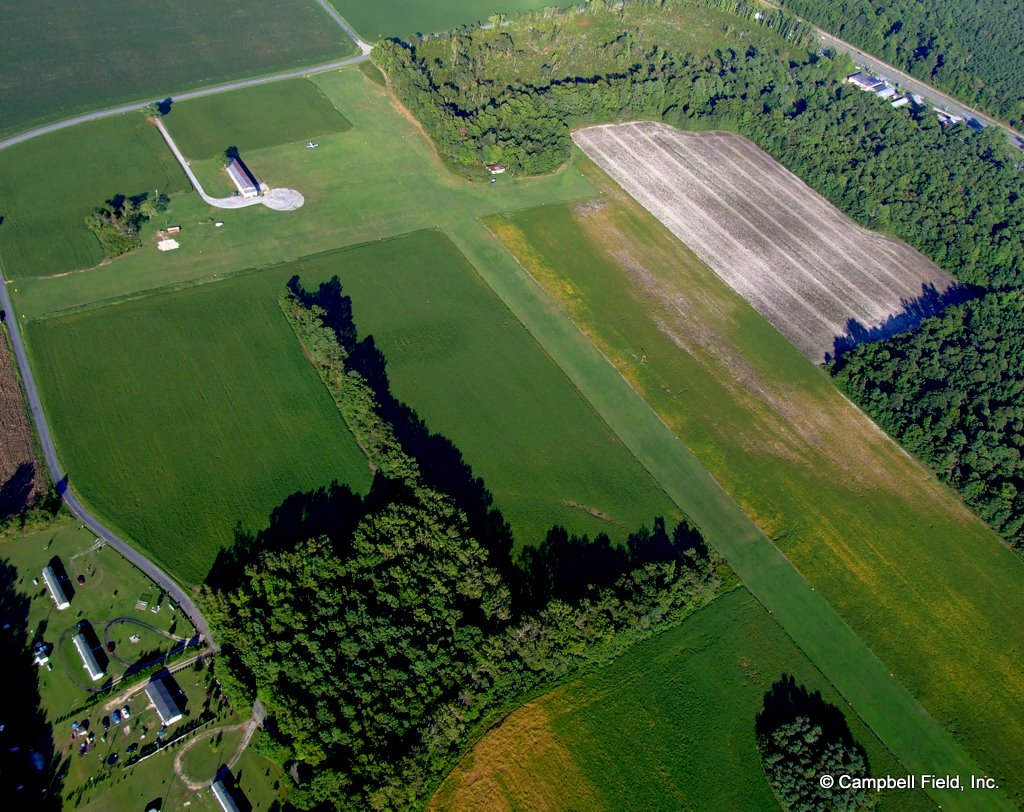
- Aerial view of Campbell Field Airport (9VG)
- IATA: none; ICAO: none; FAA LID: 9VG

Summary
- Owner/Operator: Campbell Field, Inc.
- Serves: Eastern Shore of Virginia
- Location: Weirwood, Virginia
- Elevation AMSL: 40 ft (12 m)
- Coordinates: 37°27′30″N 075°52′44″W
- Website: www.campbellfieldairport.com

Map
- Location of airport in Virginia

Runways
Direction	Length		Surface
Direction	ft	m	Surface
3/21	3,000	914	Turf
14/32	1,455	443	Turf

Campbell Field Airport (FAA LID: 9VG) is a public use general aviation airport located in the Weirwood, Virginia, United States hamlet on public highway route 617. Serving the aviation community on Virginia's Eastern Shore, the airport covers 147 acres (59 ha) and has two turf runways. Although most U.S. airports use the same three-letter location identifier for the FAA and IATA, this airport is assigned 9VG by the FAA, but has no designation from the IATA.

The airport is open during daylight, however nighttime operations are prohibited, except for military operations. Transient pilots can use aircraft tie-downs, a public restroom, and a courtesy vehicle.

== History ==
The airport was established in 1933 by Darrell M. Kellam and an application to the State Corporation Commission of Virginia for a license under Chapter 445, Acts of the Assembly of Virginia 1936, for the establishment, maintenance, operation, and conduct of an airport and landing field was granted in January 1937.

In 2003 the airport was purchased by Campbell Field, Inc. and renamed Campbell Field Airport. The FAA Airport Identifier was W08 (prior to 2001), VG26 (2001–2003), and is now 9VG (2003–present).

Eastern Shore Adventure Sports, Inc. operates the Eastern Shore Hang Gliding Center at Campbell Field Airport. There is hang glider traffic within the vicinity of Campbell Field Airport, especially on weekends.
