= Lake Country Regional Airport =

Airport in the U.S. state of Virginia

- IATA: none; ICAO: none; FAA LID: W63

Summary
- Airport type: Public
- Owner: Lake Country Regional Airport Commission
- Operator: Lake Country Regional Airport Commission
- Location: Clarksville, Virginia, U.S.
- Elevation AMSL: 419.3 ft (127.8 m)
- Coordinates: 36°35′44″N 078°33′37″W
- Website: www.lakecountryregionalairport.org
- Interactive map of Lake Country Regional Airport

Runways
Direction	Length		Surface
Direction	ft	m	Surface
04/22	4,488	1,368	Asphalt

Statistics (2022)
- Aircraft operations: 5,148
- Based aircraft: 5

Lake Country Regional Airport (FAA LID: W63) is a regional/general aviation airport in Clarksville, Virginia, United States.
