= The Story of Them Featuring Van Morrison =

Compilation album by Them
- Released: 20 October 1997 (UK)
- Recorded: 1964–1966
- Genre: Rhythm and blues, garage rock
- Length: 143:34
- Label: Deram
- Producer: Tommy Scott, Bert Berns, Dick Rowe

Them chronology
Them Again (1966)	The Story of Them Featuring Van Morrison (1997)	The Complete Them 1964-1967 (2015)

Professional ratings
Review scores
Source	Rating
AllMusic	4.5/5 stars
Uncut	4/5 stars

The Story of Them Featuring Van Morrison is a compilation album, that includes almost every song recorded by the Northern Irish band Them, during the two-year history of the band when it featured Van Morrison as the vocalist for the group.

== Track listing ==
All songs written by Van Morrison except as noted

Disc 1

1. "The Story of Them" [Parts 1 & 2] – 7:18
2. "Don't Start Crying Now" (James Moore, Jerry West) – 2:03
3. "Gloria" 2:35 (stereo)
4. "Philosophy" – 2:35
5. "One Two Brown Eyes" – 2:34 (stereo)
6. "Baby, Please Don't Go" (Big Joe Williams) – 2:40
7. "Here Comes the Night" (Bert Berns) – 2:46 (stereo)
8. "All for Myself" – 2:47
9. "One More Time" – 2:48
10. "Little Girl – 2:47
11. "I Gave My Love a Diamond" (Berns) – 3:02
12. "Go on Home Baby" (Berns) – 2:32 (stereo)
13. "My Little Baby" (Berns, Wes Farrell) – 2:00 (stereo)
14. "Mystic Eyes" – 2:41 (rechanneled)
15. "Don't Look Back" (John Lee Hooker) – 3:20 (rechanneled+)
16. "If You and I Could Be as Two" – 2:51 (stereo)
17. "I Like It Like That" – 3:16 (rechanneled+)
18. "I'm Gonna Dress in Black" (Gillon a.k.a. Tommy Scott, M. Howe) – 3:29 (stereo)
19. "(Get Your Kicks On) Route 66" (Bobby Troup) – 2:22 (rechanneled+)
20. "Just a Little Bit" (Rosco Gordon) – 2:21
21. "You Just Can't Win" – 2:21
22. "Bright Lights, Big City" (Jimmy Reed) – 2:30
23. "Baby What You Want Me to Do" (Reed) – 3:26
24. "I'm Gonna Dress in Black" (Gillon) – 3:34 [Alternate Mix]
25. "One More Time" – 2:45 [US Version – Stereo Mix] (stereo)
26. "Little Girl" – 2:47 [Alternate Version] (rechanneled+)
- UK release contains a different take of "I Gave My Love A Diamond". It also omits the alternate version of "Little Girl"

Disc 2

All songs written by Van Morrison except as noted

1. "How Long Baby" (Gillon) – 3:37
2. "(It Won't Hurt) Half As Much" (Berns) – 3:01 (stereo)
3. "Something You Got" (Chris Kenner) – 2:31
4. "Call My Name" (Scott) – 2:20
5. "Turn On Your Love Light" (Don Robey, Joseph Wade Scott) – 2:19 (rechanneled++)
6. "I Put a Spell on You" (Screamin' Jay Hawkins) – 2:36
7. "I Got A Woman" (Ray Charles) – 3:12
8. "Out of Sight" (Ted Wright a.k.a. James Brown) – 2:21
9. "It's All Over Now, Baby Blue" (Bob Dylan) – 3:47
10. "Bad Or Good" – 2:06
11. "Hello Josephine" (Dave Bartholomew, Fats Domino) – 2:04
12. "Don't You Know" (Scott) – 2:22
13. "Hey Girl" – 3:00
14. "Bring 'em on In" 3:13
15. "Times Gettin' Tougher Than Tough" (Jimmy Witherspoon) – 2:12 (rechanneled+++)
16. "Stormy Monday" (T-Bone Walker) – 2:40 (rechanneled+++)
17. "Friday's Child" – 3:27
18. "Richard Cory" (Paul Simon) – 2:43
19. "My Lonely Sad Eyes" – 2:28 (rechanneled)
20. "I Can Only Give You Everything" (Scott, Phil Coulter)– 2:39 (rechanneled++)
21. "Could You, Would You" – 3:08
22. "Bring 'em on In" – 3:41 [US Version 2]
23. "Richard Cory" (Simon) – 3:47 Version 2 (stereo)
24. "Call My Name" (Scott) – 2:18 [Version 2]

(In regards to the rechanneled tracks, + indicates sides using the Parrot rechanneled mixes with non-original added percussion, probably done for the 2LP Parrot anthology from the 1970s, ++ indicates sides using the Parrot rechanneled mixes from the second album, and +++ indicates demos that were slightly rechanneled when issued on LP in the 1960s in Germany, and they did not have the mono mixes available.)

== Notes on the album sleeve ==
- Note: The Demo "Mighty Like a Rose" has been excluded from this album
- Package design: Phil Smee at Waldo's Design & Dream Emporium
- Digitally re-mastered from the original analogue masters by Jon Astley
