= One More Time (Them song) =

- Swedish single sleeve

Single by Them
- B-side: "How Long Baby"
- Released: 11 June 1965
- Recorded: 14 May 1965
- Studio: Decca, London
- Genre: Soul
- Length: 2:48
- Label: Decca
- Songwriter(s): Van Morrison
- Producer(s): Tommy Scott

Them singles chronology
"Here Comes the Night" (1965)	"One More Time" (1965)	"(It Won't Hurt) Half as Much" (1965)

Audio
- "One More Time" on YouTube

"One More Time" is a song written by the Northern Irish singer Van Morrison, originally recorded by his band Them. Morrison wrote the song after Them's third single "Here Comes the Night" had become a top-ten hit in the UK. A soul ballad, "One More Time" was recorded at Decca Studios with producer Tommy Scott. Released on 11 June 1965, the single was a commercial failure in Britain, where it appeared on Melody Maker's chart for one week, but was a top-ten single in Sweden. Reception for the single was mixed; most critics praised Morrison's vocal performance, but deemed the track to be weaker than "Here Comes the Night".

== Background and recording ==
On 5 March 1965, Northern Irish group Them released their third single in the United Kingdom, "Here Comes the Night". The single reached number two on the UK singles chart and number 24 on the US Billboard Hot 100. The success of the single indicated that "they might emerge as rich pop stars". The follow-up to their hit would be a song written by lead vocalist Van Morrison,"One More Time" was written by the band's lead vocalist Van Morrison during a period where they were notoriously uncooperative with journalists; when Richard Green of Record Mirror asked Morrison how he wrote the song, Morrison allegedly responded with "I got a pencil and wrote it on a piece of paper". Morrison considered the song a soul ballad. On the contrary, according to author Clinton Heylin, Morrison "had very little idea" of how to compose a pop song, as "One More Time" lacked both the "raw rasp" of "Gloria" (1964) and the "snappy drive" of "Here Comes the Night".

Them recorded "One More Time" during the last of three recording sessions for their debut album The "Angry" Young Them on 14 May 1965 at Decca Studios in London together with the tracks "I'm Gonna Dress In Black", "How Long Baby", "If You and I Could Be As Two" and "You Just Can't Win". The session was produced by Scottish producer Tommy Scott, engineered by Vic Smith and featured session musicians Bobby Graham on drums and Phil Coulter on piano. According to Morrison, Scott had attempted to give the song a commercial touch, adding echo to his vocals, something that Morrison did not find out about until a few days after the song was recorded, when he received an acetate of the song.

== Release and reception ==
Decca Records released "One More Time" as the follow-up single to "Here Comes the Night" on 11 June 1965, (Note: Catalogue number Decca F 12175.) a release date which coincided with the release of The "Angry" Young Them album. The B-side was "How Long Baby", which had been written by Tommy Scott under the pseudonym M. Gillon. The single's release was shrouded in controversy amongst the band's members; guitarist Billy Harrison stated that "One More Time" didn't constitute of "single material" and that they should've released the song "(It Won't Hurt) Half as Much", which was written by Bert Berns. (Note: Harrison got his will through as "(It Won't Hurt) Half as Much" was released as Them's fifth single on 27 August 1965. However, by that point Harrison had left the band.) Morrison stated that Berns "disappeared", prompting Scott to issue "One More Time" as a single instead. Harrison instead argues the group's manager Phil Solomon decided to release the record, as the song was written by Morrison and Solomon owned the publishing rights to his songs. Nonetheless, Solomon paid for a full-page ad in New Musical Express to promote the release.

Despite the fanfare surrounding the group at the time, "One More Time" failed to chart entirely on the Record Retailer chart. Out of all the British music trade publications, it solely charted on Melody Maker's Pop 50 chart, where it reached number 48 for a sole week in early July 1965. The chart failure of "One More Time" left Morrison to "lose faith in Them". Harrison stated that they had found out about the single's release when the band had heard it being played on the radio. Morrison instead blamed Tommy Scott's production of the song as a key reason behind the chart failure, as he had turned it into a "commercial thing" which didn't fully represent Them's style. However, the song managed to become a top-ten hit in Sweden during August 1965, reaching numbers six and nine on Tio i Topp and Kvällstoppen, respectively. Because it wasn't a hit in the UK, Parrot Records did not give "One More Time" a single release in the US. Although excluded from The "Angry" Young Them in the UK, Parrot Records replaced five songs from said album and replaced them by "Here Comes the Night", "One More Time" and "One Two Brown Eyes", giving the song its first album release in August 1965.

Upon release, "One More Time" received primarily mixed reviews in the British music press. Writing for Disc Weekly, journalist Penny Valentine wrote that the song was reminiscent of the Rolling Stones covering a Solomon Burke song. She notes that Morrison "sings insinuatingly" as if he had "hot potatoes in his mouth". Although she writes that the song is professionally performed, she believes the backing and lyrical content to be uninspired, which didn't strike her as "being as good as their earlier disks". She noted that the song was "very slow indeed". In New Musical Express, critic Derek Johnson stated that Morrison "generated much more soul" compared to his "British contemporaries". He noted it to be a "slow-pounding beat ballad", praising Morrison's vocals for their "immense" and "heart-searching feeling". However, Johnson believed "One More Time" didn't strike him as a hit in the same way as "Here Comes the Night" did, but believed it to become a hit. Norman Jopling and Peter Jones of Record Mirror believed Morrison's vocal performance to be raucous with a "vocal whack", though believes the short spoken word section detracts from the performance. They also praise Harrison's guitar playing and the drums as "reasonably well controlled".

== Personnel ==
According to the essay Them Studio Sessions.

Them

- Van Morrison – lead vocals
- Billy Harrison – guitar
- Alan Henderson – bass guitar
- Peter Bardens – organ
- Pat McAuley – tambourine

Other personnel

- Tommy Scott – producer
- Vic Smith – engineer
- Bobby Graham – drums
- Phil Coulter – piano

== Charts ==
Weekly chart performance for "One More Time"
Chart (1965)	Peak position
Sweden (Kvällstoppen)	9
Sweden (Tio i Topp)	6
UK (Melody Maker Pop 50)	48
