= The Complete Them 1964–1967 =

Compilation album by Them
- Released: 4 December 2015
- Recorded: 1964–1966
- Length: 201:00
- Label: Legacy
- Producer: Dick Rowe, Bert Berns, Tommy Scott

Them chronology
The Story of Them Featuring Van Morrison (1997)	The Complete Them 1964–1967 (2015)

The Complete Them 1964–1967 is a compilation album by the Northern Irish band Them. It includes nearly every song recorded by the group when Van Morrison was the lead vocalist. It contains liner notes written by Morrison and was released through his production company, Exile Productions. Unlike the previous compilation,The Story of Them Featuring Van Morrison, this collection is chronologically sequenced and contains an extra disc featuring demos, alternate versions, rare tracks, and sessions recorded by the BBC, many of which were previously unreleased.

== Reception ==
Professional ratings
Review scores
Source	Rating
AllMusic	5/5 stars
American Songwriter	5/5 stars
Louder	4.5/5 stars
Uncut	4/5 stars

Bud Scoppa of Uncut remarked that two-thirds of the album "provide ample proof of [Morrison's] preternatural genius," giving it a four-star rating. Louder's Jon Harrington rated the album 4.5 stars, referring to the release as "most comprehensive round-up of Van Morrison's Them ever issued."

The album received a five-star rating from American Songwriter, whose reviewer Hal Horowitz stated, "the historic value of the compilation and the surfeit of previously unreleased tracks makes this essential for Morrison newcomers and longtime fans." Mark Deming of AllMusic opined, "As a history of an underappreciated band's greatest era or the first steps of one of rock's most individual artists, The Complete Them: 1964–1967 is essential listening."

== Track listing ==
All lyrics are written by Van Morrison.

Disc 1 – The Complete Them 1964–1967
No.	Title	Writer(s)	Length
1.	"Don't Start Crying Now"	James Moore, Jerry West	2:03
2.	"One Two Brown Eyes"		2:34
3.	"Baby, Please Don't Go"	Big Joe Williams	2:40
4.	"Gloria"		2:35
5.	"Philosophy"		2:35
6.	"Here Comes the Night"	Bert Berns	2:46
7.	"All for Myself"		2:47
8.	"One More Time"		2:48
9.	"How Long Baby"	Gillon	3:37
10.	"Mystic Eyes"		2:41
11.	"If You and I Could Be as Two"		2:51
12.	"Little Girl (album version)"		2:47
13.	"Just a Little Bit"	Rosco Gordon	2:21
14.	"I Gave My Love a Diamond"	Bert Berns	3:02
15.	"You Just Can't Win"		2:21
16.	"Go on Home Baby"	Bert Berns	2:32
17.	"Don't Look Back" (rechanneled+)	John Lee Hooker	3:20
18.	"I Like It Like That"		3:16
19.	"I'm Gonna Dress in Black"	Gillon a.k.a. Tommy Scott, M. Howe	3:29
20.	"Bright Lights, Big City"	Jimmy Reed	2:30
21.	"My Little Baby"	Bert Berns, Wes Farrell	2:00
22.	"(Get Your Kicks On) Route 66"	Bobby Troup	2:22
23.	"(It Won't Hurt) Half As Much"	Bert Berns	3:01

All lyrics are written by Van Morrison.

Disc 2 – The Complete Them 1964–1967
No.	Title	Writer(s)	Length
1.	"Could You, Would You"		3:08
2.	"Something You Got"	Chris Kenner	2:31
3.	"Call My Name" (album version)	Scott	2:20
4.	"Turn On Your Love Light"	Don Robey, Joseph Wade Scott	2:19
5.	"I Put a Spell on You"	Screamin' Jay Hawkins	2:36
6.	"I Can Only Give You Everything"	Scott, Phil Coulter	2:39
7.	"My Lonely Sad Eyes"		2:28
8.	"I Got a Woman"	Ray Charles	3:12
9.	"Out of Sight"	Ted Wright a.k.a. James Brown	2:21
10.	"It's All Over Now, Baby Blue"	Bob Dylan	3:47
11.	"Bad or Good"		2:06
12.	"Hello Josephine"	Dave Bartholomew, Fats Domino	2:04
13.	"Don't You Know"	Scott	2:22
14.	"Hey Girl"		3:00
15.	"Bring 'Em on In" (album version)		3:13
16.	"Richard Cory"	Paul Simon	2:43
17.	"Friday's Child"		3:27
18.	"The Story of Them (Part 1)"		3:52
19.	"The Story of Them (Part 2)"		3:41
20.	"Baby What You Want Me to Do"	Reed	3:26
21.	"Stormy Monday"	T-Bone Walker	2:40
22.	"Times Gettin' Tougher Than Tough"	Jimmy Witherspoon	2:12

All lyrics are written by Van Morrison.

Disc 3 – The Complete Them 1964–1967
No.	Title	Writer(s)	Length
1.	"Don't Start Crying Now (Demo)"		1:36
2.	"Gloria (Demo)"		3:05
3.	"One Two Brown Eyes (Demo)"		2:40
4.	"Stormy Monday Blues (Demo)"		5:11
5.	"Turn On Your Love Light (Alternate Version)"		4:46
6.	"Baby, Please Don't Go (Take 4)"		2:40
7.	"Here Comes the Night (Take 2)"		3:01
8.	"Gloria (Live on BBC Saturday Club)"		2:39
9.	"All for Myself (Live on BBC Saturday Club)"		3:07
10.	"Here Comes the Night (Live on BBC Saturday Club)"		2:53
11.	"Little Girl (Alternate Version)"		2:47
12.	"Go on Home Baby (Take 4)"		2:38
13.	"I Gave My Love a Diamond (Take 8)"		3:09
14.	"(It Won't Hurt) Half As Much (Take 2)"		3:12
15.	"My Little Baby (Take 1)"		2:17
16.	"How Long Baby (Take 1)"		3:38
17.	"One More Time (Take 14)"		2:52
18.	"Gloria (Live on BBC Saturday Club, Version 2)"		2:52
19.	"Here Comes the Night (Live on BBC Saturday Club, Version 2)"		2:47
20.	"One More Time (Live on BBC Saturday Club)"		2:53
21.	"Call My Name (Single Version)"		2:18
22.	"Bring 'Em on In (Single Version)"		3:42
23.	"Mighty Like a Rose"	Morrison	4:00
24.	"Richard Cory (Alternate Version)"		3:47
