= Baby, Please Don't Go =

Traditional blues standard

Single by Joe Williams' Washboard Blues Singers
- B-side: "Wild Cow Blues"
- Released: 1935
- Recorded: Chicago, October 31, 1935
- Genre: Blues
- Length: 3:22
- Label: Bluebird
- Songwriter: Traditional (J. Williams credited on record)
- Producer: Lester Melrose

Official audio
- "Baby, Please Don't Go" on YouTube

"Baby, Please Don't Go" is a traditional blues song that was popularized by Delta blues musician Big Joe Williams in 1935. Many cover versions followed, leading to its description as "one of the most played, arranged, and rearranged pieces in blues history" by French music historian Gérard Herzhaft.

After World War II, Chicago blues and rhythm and blues artists adapted the song to newer music styles. In 1952, a doo-wop version by the Orioles reached the top ten on the R&B chart. In 1953, Muddy Waters recorded the song as an electric Chicago-ensemble blues piece, which influenced many subsequent renditions. By the early 1950s, the song became a blues standard.

In the 1960s, "Baby, Please Don't Go" became a popular rock song after the Northern Irish group Them recorded it in 1964. Jimmy Page, a studio guitarist at the time, participated in the recording session, possibly on rhythm guitar. Subsequently, Them's uptempo rock arrangement also made it a rock standard. Paul Revere & the Raiders, AC/DC, Aerosmith, John Mellencamp, Amboy Dukes, and Welsh power trio Budgie are among the rock groups who have recorded the song. "Baby, Please Don't Go" has been inducted into both the Blues and Rock and Roll Halls of Fame.

== Background ==
"Baby, Please Don't Go" is likely an adaptation of "Long John", an old folk theme that dates back to the time of slavery in the United States. Blues researcher Paul Garon notes that the melody is based on "Alabamy Bound", composed by Tin Pan Alley writer Ray Henderson, with lyrics by Buddy DeSylva and Bud Green in 1925. (Note: An earlier "I'm Alabama Bound", with its own recording history, was published by Robert Hoffman in 1909.) The song, a vaudeville show tune, inspired several other songs between 1925 and 1935, such as "Elder Greene Blues", "Alabama Bound", and "Don't You Leave Me Here". These variants were recorded by Charlie Patton, Lead Belly, Monette Moore, Henry Thomas, and Tampa Red.

Author Linda Dahl suggests a connection to a song with the same title by Mary Williams Johnson in the late 1920s and early 1930s. However, Johnson, who was married to jazz-influenced blues guitarist Lonnie Johnson, never recorded it and her song is not discussed as influencing later performers. Blues researcher Jim O'Neal notes that Williams "sometimes said that the song was written by his wife, singer Bessie Mae Smith a.k.a. Blue Belle and St. Louis Bessie."

== Original song ==
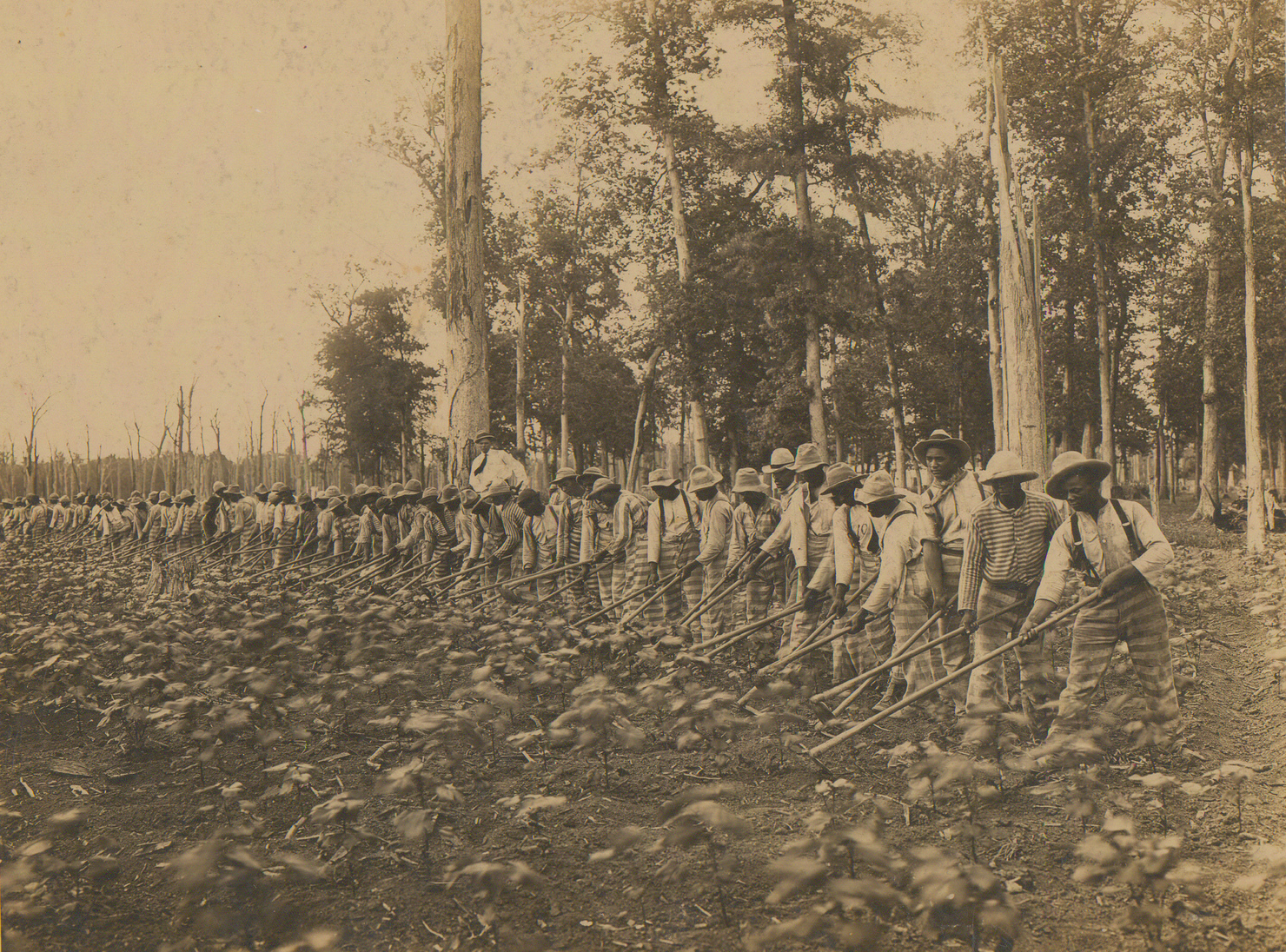
Chain gang at Mississippi State Penitentiary, commonly known as "Parchman Farm", in 1911

Big Joe Williams used an imprisonment theme for his October 31, 1935, recording of "Baby, Please Don't Go". He recorded it during his first session for Lester Melrose and Bluebird Records in Chicago. It is an ensemble piece with Williams on vocal and guitar accompanied by Dad Tracy on one-string fiddle and Chasey "Kokomo" Collins on washboard, who are listed as "Joe Williams' Washboard Blues Singers" on the single. Musical notation for the song indicates a moderate-tempo fifteen-bar blues in 4/4 or common time in the key of B flat. (Note: The sheet music includes a 1944 copyright date, indicating a later version of the song (Williams' 1935 recording is in the key of B).) As with many Delta blues songs of the era, it remains on the tonic chord (I) throughout without the progression to the subdominant (IV) or dominant (V) chords. The lyrics express a prisoner's anxiety about his lover leaving before he returns home:

Now baby please don't go, now baby please don't go
Baby please don't go back to New Orleans, and get your cold ice cream
I believe there's a man done gone, I believe there's a man done gone
I believe there's a man done gone to the county farm, with a long chain on

The song became a hit and established Williams' recording career. On December 12, 1941, he recorded a second version titled "Please Don't Go" in Chicago for Bluebird, with a more modern arrangement and lyrics. Blues historian Gerard Herzhaft calls it "the most exciting version", which Williams recorded using his trademark nine-string guitar. Accompanying him are Sonny Boy Williamson I on harmonica and Alfred Elkins on imitation bass (possibly a washtub bass). Since both songs appeared before recording industry publications began tracking such releases, it is unknown which version was more popular. In 1947, he recorded it for Columbia Records with Williamson and Ransom Knowling on bass and Judge Riley on drums. This version did not reach the Billboard Race Records chart, but represents a move toward a more urban blues treatment of the song.

== Later blues and R&B recordings ==
Big Joe Williams' various recordings inspired other blues musicians to record their interpretations of the song and it became a blues standard. Early examples include Papa Charlie McCoy as "Tampa Kid" (1936), Leonard "Baby Doo" Caston (1939), Lightnin' Hopkins — called "Back to New Orleans" (1947), John Lee Hooker (1949), and Big Bill Broonzy (1952). By the early 1950s, the song was reworked in contemporary musical styles, with an early rhythm and blues/jump blues version by Billy Wright (1951), a harmonized doo-wop version by the Orioles (a number eight R&B hit in 1952), (Note: The Orioles' original 1952 Jubilee single lists the songwriters as "Strutt – Alexander", while a compilation issued by the label in 1962 lists the writers as "T. Skye – R. C. Gardner") (Note: Music historian Larry Birbaum suggested that the Orioles' 1951 version inspired James Brown's first hit "Please, Please, Please" (1956).) and an Afro-Cuban-influenced rendition by Rose Mitchell (1954). Mose Allison recorded the tune in his jazz-blues piano style for the album Transfiguration of Hiram Brown (1960).

In 1953, Muddy Waters recast the song as a Chicago-blues ensemble piece with Little Walter and Jimmy Rogers. Chess Records originally issued the single with the title "Turn the Lamp Down Low", although the song is also referred to as "Turn Your Lamp Down Low", "Turn Your Light Down Low", or "Baby Please Don't Go". (Note: Muddy Waters' original Chess single lists the songwriters as "Strutt, Alexander", although reissues credit "McKinley Morganfield" (his legal name). The song is registered as "Turn the Lamps [sic] Down Low" with Joseph Lee Williams as the songwriter. ISWC T-070.278.618-2.) He regularly played the song, several performances were recorded. Live versions appear on Muddy Waters at Newport 1960 and on Live at the Checkerboard Lounge, Chicago 1981 with members of the Rolling Stones. AllMusic critic Bill Janovitz cites the influence of Waters' adaptation:

The most likely link between the Williams recordings and all the rock covers that came in the 1960s and 1970s would be the Muddy Waters 1953 Chess side, which retains the same swinging phrasing as the Williams takes, but the session musicians beef it up with a steady driving rhythm section, electrified instruments and Little Walter Jacobs wailing on blues harp.

Mose Allison recorded a jazzy version on his album Mose Allison Takes to the Hills (Epic, 1962).

== Van Morrison and Them version ==
"Baby, Please Don't Go"

Single by Them
- B-side: "Gloria"
- Released: November 6, 1964 (UK); 1965 (US)
- Recorded: October 1964
- Genre: Blues rock; garage rock; proto-punk
- Length: 2:40
- Label: Decca (UK); Parrot (US)
- Songwriter: Traditional (J. Williams credited on record)
- Producer: Bert Berns

Them singles chronology
"Don't Start Crying Now" / "One Two Brown Eyes" (1964)	"Baby, Please Don't Go" (1964)	"Here Comes the Night" (1965)

"Baby Please Don't Go" was one of the earliest songs recorded by Them, fronted by a 19-year-old Van Morrison. Their rendition of the song was derived from a version recorded by John Lee Hooker in 1949 as "Don't Go Baby". (Note: John Lee Hooker was listed as "Texas Slim" on the single "Don't Go Baby" (King 4334).) Hooker's song later appeared on a 1959 album, Highway of Blues, which Van Morrison heard and felt was "something really unique and different" with "more soul" than he had previously heard.

=== Recording and composition ===
Them recorded "Baby, Please Don't Go" for Decca Records in October 1964. Besides Morrison, there is conflicting information about who participated in the session. In addition to the group's original members (guitarist Billy Harrison, bassist Alan Henderson, drummer Ronnie Millings and keyboard player Eric Wrixon), others have been suggested: Pat McAuley on keyboards, Bobby Graham on a second drum kit, Jimmy Page on guitar, and Peter Bardens on keyboards. As Page biographer George Case notes, "There is a dispute over whether it is Page's piercing blues line that defines the song, if he only played a run Harrison had already devised, or if Page only backed up Harrison himself". Morrison has acknowledged Page's participation in the early sessions: "He played rhythm guitar on one thing and doubled a bass riff on the other" and Morrison biographer Johnny Rogan notes that Page "doubled the distinctive riff already worked out by Billy Harrison".

Janovitz identifies the riff as "the backbone of the arrangement" and describes Henderson's contribution as an "amphetamine-rush, pulsing two-note bass line." (Note: Janovitz claims that Henderson's bass line "was later lifted by Golden Earring for 'Radar Love'".) Music critic Greil Marcus comments that during the song's quieter middle passage "the guitarist, session player Jimmy Page or not, seems to be feeling his way into another song, flipping half-riffs, high, random, distracted metal shavings". (Note: Beginning about 1:22 in Them's recording, bassy-sounding riffs appear.) Them's blues rock arrangement is "now regarded justly as definitive", according to music writer Alan Clayson.

=== Releases and charts ===
Decca released "Baby, Please Don't Go" as Them's second single on November 6, 1964. With the B-side, "Gloria", it became their first hit, reaching number ten on the UK Singles Chart in February 1965. In the US, the single was released by Parrot Records. On March 20, Billboard magazine first listed the song on its extended "Bubbling Under the Hot 100" chart, where it eventually peaked at number 102 on April 24. The single fared better on the West Coast, where both songs topped the weekly Top 40 playlists for Los Angeles radio stations KRLA and KFWB. (Note: "Baby Please Don't Go" and "Gloria" remained at number one for three weeks (April 14, 21, and 28, 1965) on KRLA's "Tunedex" chart. In May 1966, Them performed an "unprecedented" 18-night engagement at the West Hollywood Whisky a Go Go nightclub.) Cash Box described it as "a funky, hard-driving pleader that the fellas rock out with telling effect".

The song was not included on Them's original British or American albums (The Angry Young Them (1965) and Them Again). Later, it was included on several compilation albums, such as The Best of Van Morrison (1990) and The Story of Them Featuring Van Morrison (1997). In 1990, Them's version appeared on the soundtrack of the David Lynch film Wild at Heart. The appearance prompted a reissue in the UK, where the single reached number 65 in the chart. Van Morrison also accompanied John Lee Hooker during a 1992 performance, where Hooker sings and plays "Baby, Please Don't Go" on guitar while sitting on a dock, with harmonica backing by Morrison; it was released on the 2004 Come See About Me Hooker DVD.

== AC/DC version ==
"Baby, Please Don't Go"

Single by AC/DC

from the album High Voltage
- A-side: "Love Song (Oh Jene)"
- Released: 3 March 1975
- Recorded: November 1974
- Studio: Albert, Sydney
- Genre: Blues rock
- Length: 4:47
- Label: Albert
- Songwriter: Traditional (Williams credited)
- Producers: Harry Vanda; George Young

AC/DC singles chronology
"Can I Sit Next to You, Girl" (1974)	"Baby, Please Don't Go" (1975)	"High Voltage" (1975)

"Baby, Please Don't Go" was a feature of AC/DC's live shows since their beginning. Although they have expressed their interest and inspiration in early blues songs, music writer Mick Wall identifies Them's adaptation of the song as the likely source. In November 1974, Angus Young, Malcolm Young, and Bon Scott recorded it for their 1975 Australian debut album, High Voltage. Tony Currenti is sometimes identified as the drummer for the song, although he suggests that it had been already recorded by Peter Clack. Wall notes that producer George Young played bass for most of the album, although Rob Bailey claims that many of the album's tracks were recorded with him.

High Voltage and a single with "Baby, Please Don't Go" were released simultaneously in Australia in February 1975. (Note: The Albert Productions AC/DC single misidentified the songwriter as Big Bill Broonzy.) Albert Productions issued it as the single's B-side. However, the A-side "Love Song (Oh Jene)" was largely ignored and "Baby, Please Don't Go" began receiving airplay. The single entered the chart at the end of March 1975 and peaked at number 10 in April. AllMusic critic Eduardo Rivadavia called the song "positively explosive", while music writer Dave Rubin described it as "primal blues rock".

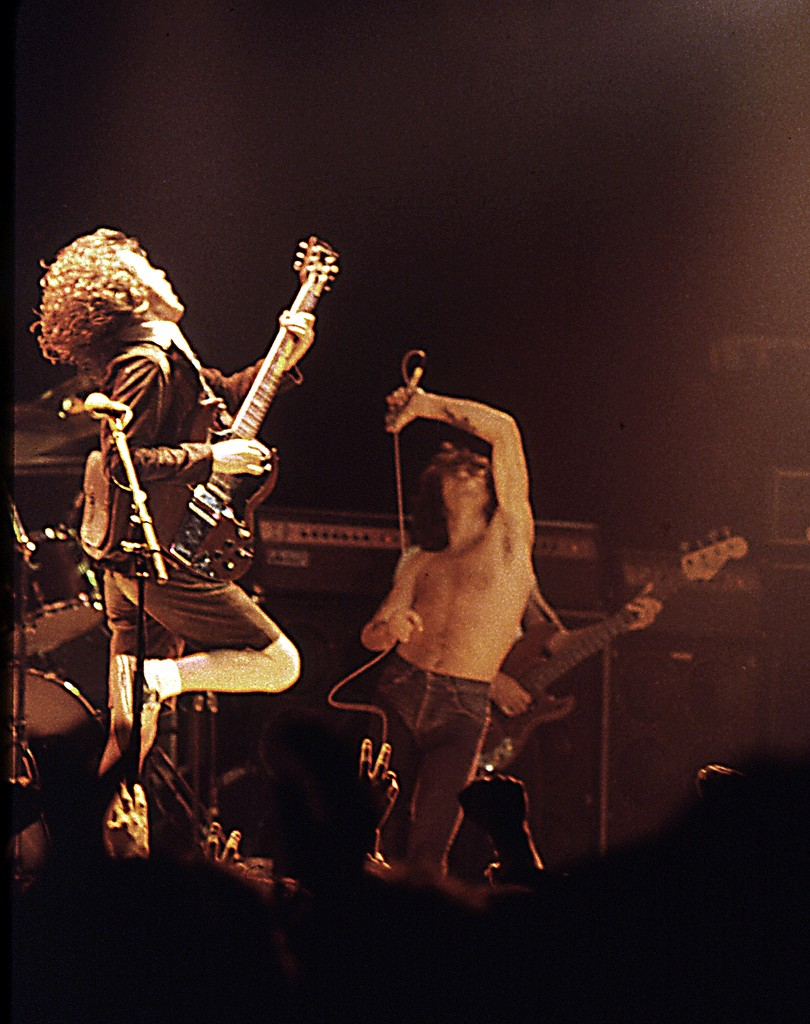
Angus Young and Bon Scott at the Ulster Hall in August 1979

On March 23, 1975, one month after drummer Phil Rudd and bassist Mark Evans joined AC/DC, the group performed the song for the first time (this performance would also be repeated on April 6 and 27, which is why there is often conflicting dates for this performance) on the Australian music program Countdown. For their appearance, "Angus wore his trade mark schoolboy uniform while Scott took the stage wearing a wig of blonde braids, a dress, make-up, and earrings", according to author Heather Miller. Joe Bonomo describes Scott as "a demented Pippi Longstocking", and Perkins notes his "tattoos and a disturbingly short skirt." Evans describes the reaction:

As soon as his vocals are about to begin he comes out from behind the drums dressed as a schoolgirl. And it was like a bomb went off in the joint; it was pandemonium, everybody broke out in laughter. [Scott] had a wonderful sense of humor.

Scott mugs for the camera and, during the guitar solo/vocal improvization section, he lights a cigarette as he duels with Angus with a green mallet. Rudd laughs throughout the performance. Although "Baby, Please Don't Go" was a popular part of AC/DC's performances (often as the closing number), the song was not released internationally until their 1984 compilation EP '74 Jailbreak. The video from the Countdown show is included on 2005's Family Jewels DVD compilation.

== Aerosmith version ==
Aerosmith recorded "Baby, Please Don't Go" for their blues cover album, Honkin' on Bobo, which was released on March 30, 2004. The album was produced by Jack Douglas, who had worked on the group's earlier albums, and reflects a return to their hard rock roots. Billboard magazine describes the song as "the kind of straight-ahead, hard-driving track that always typified the band's [1970s] records". Edna Gundersen of USA Today called their version a "terrific revival." It was the first single to be released from the album and reached number seven on the Mainstream Rock Tracks chart. A music video, directed by Mark Haefeli, was produced to promote the single. Subsequently, the song has become a staple of the band's concert repertoire.

== Recognition and legacy ==
"Baby, Please Don't Go" is recognized as a blues standard, including by French blues historian Gérard Herzhaft, who described it as "one of the most played, arranged, and rearranged pieces in blues history". The Rock and Roll Hall of Fame included Big Joe Williams' rendition in list of "500 Songs That Shaped Rock and Roll". In 1992, Williams' song was inducted into the Blues Foundation Hall of Fame in the "Classics of Blues Recordings" category. Writing for the Foundation, Jim O'Neal noted that, in addition to various blues recordings, "the song was revived in revved-up fashion by rock bands in the '60s such as Them, the Amboy Dukes, and Ten Years After".

In 1967, the Amboy Dukes recorded the song for their self-titled debut album. An album review mentions Them's version, but adds that the Amboy Dukes' "Ted Nugent and the boys totally twist it to their point-of-view, even tossing a complete Jimi Hendrix [guitar line from "Third Stone from the Sun"] nick into the mix." Released as a single, it reached number 106 on Billboard's extended "Bubbling Under the Hot 100" chart. In 1969, Ten Years After included some lyrics from "Baby, Please Don't Go" during their performance of "I'm Going Home" at the Woodstock festival in Bethel, New York. Alvin Lee's 10-minute guitar workout was a highlight of the event's 1970 documentary film, which "would cement their reputation for decades to come".
