= The Angry Young Them =

First album by the group Them

Studio album by Them
- Released: 11 June 1965
- Recorded: 1964–1965
- Studio: Decca Studios, West Hampstead, North London, England
- Genre: Blues rock; garage rock; rhythm and blues; proto-punk
- Length: 35:26
- Label: Decca
- Producer: Tommy Scott; Bert Berns ("I Gave My Love a Diamond", "Go On Home Baby", "My Little Baby"); Dick Rowe ("Gloria")

Them chronology
The Angry Young Them (1965)	Them Again (1966)

Professional ratings
Review scores
Source	Rating
AllMusic	4.5/5 stars
Record Mirror	4/5 stars

Them

Studio album by Them
- Released: July 1965
- Recorded: 1964–1965
- Studio: Decca Studios, West Hampstead, North London, England
- Genre: Blues rock; garage rock; rhythm and blues; proto-punk
- Length: 34:17
- Label: Parrot
- Producer: Tommy Scott; Bert Berns ("Go On Home Baby"); Dick Rowe ("Gloria")

Them American chronology
Them (1965)	Them Again (1966)

The Angry Young Them is the first album by the Northern Irish rhythm and blues band Them, whose lead singer and songwriter was Van Morrison. The album was released in the UK in June 1965. In the U.S., the album was released as Them with partly different tracks.

== Cover ==
As with several Decca releases of the period, the name of the group was conspicuously absent from the front cover. On the back of the LP they were introduced as The Angry Young Them with an essay on this theme declaring: "These five young rebels are outrageously true to themselves. Defiant! Angry! Sad! They are honest to the point of insult!"

== Release history ==
Six of the songs on the album were Morrison originals, including the famous garage band anthem "Gloria". Another song on the album, "Mystic Eyes", was a spontaneous creation that came out of the band just "busking around" in Morrison's words and after seven minutes of instrumental playing he impulsively threw in the words of a song he had been working on. The lengthy versions of "Gloria" that the band performed at the Maritime and the 10-minute recording of "Mystic Eyes" have never surfaced. All that is left of the "Mystic Eyes" performance is the little over 2 1/2 minutes on the album that remained after splicing out from the beginning and ending. "You Just Can't Win" was a Bob Dylan-inspired song about a gold digger, set in specific places in London such as Camden Town. "Little Girl" was about a boy's obsession with a 14-year-old school girl (an earlier take on Lord's Taverners charity album had been deleted when a profanity was heard in the fade out at the end). "If You And I Could Be As Two" starts with a spoken introduction by Morrison. Three originals by Bert Berns were included and a cover of John Lee Hooker's "Don't Look Back" was considered by Morrison to be his finest vocal to date.

== Track listing ==
=== British version ===
Side one

1. "Mystic Eyes" (Van Morrison) – 2:41
2. "If You and I Could Be as Two" (Morrison) – 2:53
3. "Little Girl" (Morrison) – 2:21
4. "Just a Little Bit" (Ralph Bass, Buster Brown, John Thornton, Ferdinand "Fats" Washington) – 2:21
5. "I Gave My Love a Diamond" (Bert Berns, Wes Farrell) – 2:48
6. "Gloria" (Morrison) – 2:38
7. "You Just Can't Win" (Morrison) – 2:21

Side two

1. "Go on Home Baby" (Berns, Farrell) – 2:39
2. "Don't Look Back" (John Lee Hooker) – 3:23
3. "I Like It Like That" (Morrison) – 3:35
4. "I'm Gonna Dress in Black" (M. Gillon aka Tommy Scott, M. Howe) – 3:34
5. "Bright Lights, Big City" (Jimmy Reed) – 2:30
6. "My Little Baby" (Berns, Farrell) – 2:00
7. "(Get Your Kicks On) Route 66" (Bobby Troup) – 2:22

=== North American version ===
Side one

1. "Here Comes the Night" (Berns) – 2:45
2. "Mystic Eyes" – 2:41
3. "Don't Look Back" – 3:23
4. "Little Girl" – 2:21
5. "One Two Brown Eyes" (Morrison) – 2:39
6. "Gloria" – 2:38

Side two

1. "One More Time" – 2:47
2. "If You and I Could Be as Two" – 2:53
3. "I Like It Like That" – 3:35
4. "I'm Gonna Dress in Black" – 3:34
5. "(Get Your Kicks On) Route 66" – 2:22
6. "Go on Home Baby" – 2:39
