= The Rivals (band) =

English punk rock band

- Origin: Ramsgate, Kent, England
- Genres: Punk rock
- Years active: 1976–1981
- Labels: Ace, Oakwood
- Past members: Mark Edwards; Paul Leinster; Marc Hebden; Paul Daley; Stan Gretsch

The Rivals were an English punk rock band from Ramsgate, Kent, England.

== History ==
Mark Edwards and Paul Leinster were boyhood friends. Tired of playing air guitar to the likes of Diamond Dogs and "20th Century Boy", the teenaged Edwards bought a real guitar, a Les Paul copy, in 1976. After seeing the Sex Pistols on So It Goes, Leinster wanted to play, too, and he duly received a bass guitar for Christmas. The Rivals' first practice was on Boxing Day.

The two, like other early punks, saw shows by many of the seminal, though then mostly unhailed, giants of the nascent punk scene: the Stranglers, the Buzzcocks, the Slits, Gang of Four, and the Clash. "A skinny little Herbert" named Marc Hebden joined Edwards and Leinster on drums; they rehearsed at his house as there was more room. The Rivals played shows in and around Ramsgate, and gigged enough to be able to afford a studio session. The result, in 1979, was "Future Rights", and it was well received. Indeed, it was possible for one punk zine from Canterbury to report that, at this time, the Rivals had 'something of a hardcore following'. There was, however, no national recognition.

Personal differences led to the replacement of Marc Hebden on drums. Paul Daley (later to form Leftfield and top the British charts), a schoolfriend of Paul Leinster, joined. The band indicated that they had 'plans to release a golden oldie for [a] follow-up' to their first single. Another studio session, in 1980, produced "Here Comes the Night", partnered by "Both Sides" as the B-side. Edwards suggested that the Rivals cover the song after hearing it on David Bowie's Pin Ups. "Being stupid enough not to realise it wasn't even Bowie's song", that it was a Them song, the band produced a blistering, punked-up version of the bluesy hit. The record received airplay from Paul Burnett, Mike Read, and John Peel, the last of whom played the original and the Rivals' version back-to-back at the end of one of his programmes to show how superior he thought the Ramsgate lads' take was.

Unfortunately, the Rivals were unable to capitalise on the positive exposure. Oakwood Records only pressed a few thousand, and, though at least one major label was interested in taking over the distribution, Oakwood, for reasons that are still unknown, refused. 'Here Comes the Night' was the single of the week in Record Mirror, but, without national distribution, the chance for chart success had gone. Citing musical differences, Paul Daley left the band (with Edwards telling him, ironically, 'you'll never make it with that attitude'). Stan Gretsch (real name Ralph Littlejohn) proved to be the Rivals' final drummer. With Gretsch's death in a car accident (in a stolen car) in 1981, and Edwards' move to Naughty Thoughts, the Rivals dissolved.

With the resurgence of interest in first wave punk that began in the mid-1990s, it was probably inevitable that a Rivals' collection would be produced. A twenty-track compilation album called If Only came out in 2007.

== Reception ==
First single "Future Rights" was something of a hit in 1979 in the Kent punk scene (at least in Thanet), and the Rivals drew (sometimes ambivalent) comparisons to the already-defunct Sex Pistols. One zine declared that "it has now become the norm for people of all ages to be seen unashamable & openly in the streets whistling the bass line of 'Future Rights' the debut and a very fine indeed release." Another writer appreciated that "Flowers", the flip side, "is good for a laugh as the big bullies wreak mindless violence on an innocent daffodil." This was sharp, sneering punk, and was appreciated as such.

But it was 'Here Comes the Night' that attracted attention in London. Mike Read made it his single of the week on Radio 1 and Paul Burnett and John Peel were both enthusiastic about it. The scenesters were less unanimous. Some praised the record as "a spirited version of the song that owes more to enthusiasm than expertise, but ... thankfully free of cliches and worn out platitudes", but others cited it as an example of "how to ruin a good song using an ancient Pete Townshend guitar technique and a surplus of unharnessed exuberance", and yet others wished that the Rivals would get back to recording their own material. Nevertheless, for the listener today, 'Here Comes the Night' is probably the band's signature recording, sharp and bright, and the A-side is one of the most frequently anthologized punk obscurities of its time.

== Discography ==
- 'Future Rights' / 'Flowers', Ace, 1979
- 'Here Comes the Night' / 'Both Sides', Oakwood, 1980
- If Only, Bin Liner, 2007
