= Jim Armstrong (guitarist) =

Musical artist (born 1944)

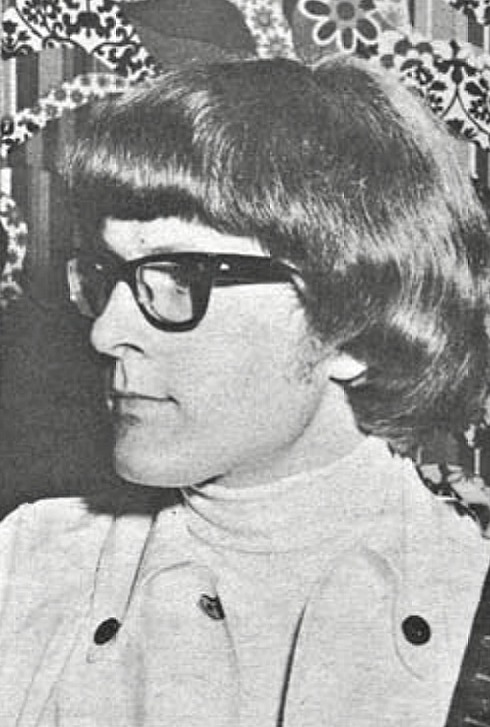
- Armstrong circa 1966

Background information
- Born: 24 July 1944 (age 82); Belfast, County Antrim, Northern Ireland
- Instrument: Guitar
- Years active: 1960s–present
- Formerly of: Them

James Armstrong (born 24 July 1944) is a guitarist from Northern Ireland. He is best known for having been a member of the rock group Them in the mid-1960s before starting a career in America. He later toured with the Them spinoff group "The Belfast Blues Band", featuring former members of the band.

== Early life ==
Armstrong was born in Belfast. He received his first acoustic guitar from his aunt after he passed his Eleven-plus. His first band was The Olympics, before he then joined one of his first professional bands, The Melotones.

== Career ==
=== Them ===
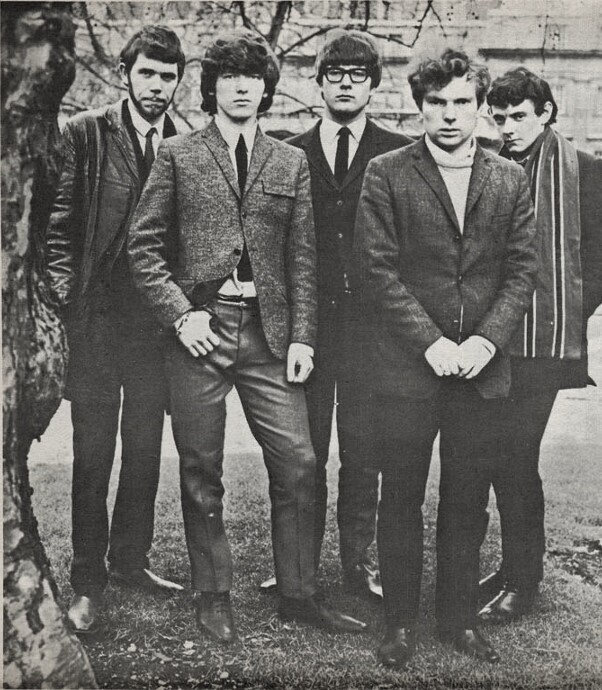
Them in 1966, Armstrong is stood in the centre

In 1965, Armstrong joined the band Them, fronted by Van Morrison. They had previously relocated from Belfast to England, but after they disbanded, Morrison decided to return to Belfast and form a new Them lineup. Armstrong was chosen as he had done session work for their managing company. Around this time, Armstrong had been working as a bank clerk. His first recording with the band was their second studio album, Them Again. After releasing two Psychedelia albums in the late 1960s, Armstrong left Them with Morrison's replacement, Kenny McDowell, to return to Belfast and form a new band, Sk'boo.

=== 1970s ===
Armstrong also began a career in America. In 1969, he formed the Chicago-based blues band Truth. Since the late 1960s, Armstrong has altered the way he performs Them's hit "Gloria", as he now plays the hymn "Gloria in Excelsis Deo" in the middle of the song, which he reportedly did after hearing Frank Zappa do so.

Armstrong returned to Northern Ireland in the early 1970s, and briefly retired from music and raised a family. By the late 1970s, Armstrong had slowly returned to music. In the late '70s, after playing with Kenneth McDowell in another band, Spike, Armstrong was guitarist with Northern Irish rock outfit Light. Armstrong and his 'Light' bandmate Brian Scott also played in a brief 'Them' tour of Germany in 1979.

=== The Belfast Blues Band ===
After touring for nine years with one of the many incarnations of 'Them – The Belfast Blues Band' in the 1990s with Eric Wrixon (the person who gave 'Them' their name, but never toured with the original band), he formed the Jim Armstrong Band with Scottish singer and harp player Jim Gilchrist, bass player Ali McKenzie and drummer Siggi Heilek (both ex members of the Them - Belfast Blues Band).

In 1993, Armstrong formed another "Them - The Belfast Blues Band" lineup, who would have a lot of success in Germany. The Them spinoff lasted until 2003, and the Jim Armstrong Band toured until the late 2010s.

== Personal life ==
In 1971, disillusioned with the music industry, Armstrong returned to Northern Ireland from American, and became a civil servant. When The Troubles hit too close to home, Armstrong moved with his wife Ann and their children to Antrim, a town he was already familiar with from being a child.

Armstrong owned a 1959 Gibson Les Paul bought in America when touring with Them in 1968, and now owned and used frequently by Mike McCready of the rock group Pearl Jam.

== Influences ==
His influences were mostly blues musicians such as Big Bill Broonzy, Muddy Waters and Howlin' Wolf. He developed his "hybrid style using a pick and fingers" by listening to many different guitarists including Merle Travis.

== Discography ==
=== Them ===
- Them Again (January 1966, Decca Records (U.K.); April 1966, Parrot (U.S.); CD reissue 1990, Polygram)

- Call My Name / Bring 'em on In (March 1966, Decca Records)
- Richard Cory / Don't You Know (May 1966, Decca Records)
- Dirty Old Man (At The Age of Sixteen) / Square Room (August 1967, Sully Records 1021)
- Walking in the Queen's Garden / I Happen To Love You (November 1967, Ruff Records 1088)
- Dirty Old Man (At The Age of Sixteen) / Square Room (December 1967, Tower Records; newly-recorded versions of both tracks)
- Walking in the Queen's Garden / I Happen To Love You (December 1967, Tower Records 384; re-issue of Ruff Records 1088)

- Now and "Them" (January 1968, Tower Records; CD reissue 2003, Rev-Ola Records)

- But It's Alright / Square Room (April 1968, Tower Records 407; 'B' side edited version of album track)

- Time Out! Time in For Them (November 1968, Tower Records; CD reissue 2003, Rev-Ola Records)

- Waltz of the Flies / We've All Agreed To Help (1969, Tower Records 461)
- Corina / Dark Are The Shadows (March 1969, Tower Records 493)

=== Truth ===
- Of Them & Other Tales (1995, Epilogue Records; recorded in 1969-1970)

=== Light ===
- The Break / Castles in the Sand (1978, Mint Records CHEW 21)

- Light (1979, Mint Records MINT 11)

- Dry Your Eyes / Turn Out The Light (1980, Shock Rock SRS 501)

=== Sk'Boo ===
- It's A Hard Road / Music Is Life / Talking Pictures-God's Peace in Mind (1982, Cuecomber Records CUE 1001)

=== Them – The Belfast Blues Band ===
- Live in Europe '96 (1997, BBB; only sold at live shows)
- Them 2000 (2001; only sold at live shows)

=== Jim Armstrong Band ===
- Live in Belfast (2003; only sold at live shows)
- 100% X VOL (2005; only sold at live shows)
