= One Two Brown Eyes =

Single by Them
- A-side: "Don't Start Crying Now"
- Released: 4 September 1964
- Recorded: 5 May 1964
- Studio: Decca, London
- Genre: Bossa nova; calypso; proto-psychedelia
- Length: 2:42
- Label: Decca
- Songwriter: Van Morrison
- Producer: Dick Rowe

Them singles chronology
"Don't Start Crying Now" / "One Two Brown Eyes" (1964)	"Baby, Please Don't Go" (1964)

Audio
- "One Two Brown Eyes" on YouTube

"One Two Brown Eyes" is a song written by Van Morrison, originally recorded by his group Them in 1964. After leaving an Irish showband, Morrison returned to his hometown of Belfast, where he joined up with guitarist Billy Harrison, bassist Alan Henderson and keyboardist Eric Wrixon and formed the band that would eventually become Them. "One Two Brown Eyes" most likely originated during jam sessions at the Maritime Hotel where Them had a residency. After featuring it on a demo, Them were signed to Decca Records by Dick Rowe who also produced the studio recording of it on 5 May 1964.

Noted for its bossa nova and calypso beats, "One Two Brown Eyes" has often been considered "proto-psychedelic" by critics, largely owing to Harrison's performance, where he emulated a slide guitar using a thimble. Morrison's vocal performance on the song has been considered "menacing", while the lyrical content has been called "typical" of his writing. Decca Records released "One Two Brown Eyes" as the B‑side of "Don't Start Crying Now" as Them's debut single on 4 September 1964. Despite being a commercial failure, the song has received praise by critics and is considered an influence on other bands, including the Doors

== Background and recording ==
By 1964, Northern Irish singer Van Morrison had been part of the music industry for some time, having toured West Germany with an Irish showband named the International Monarchs, where he'd play harmonica, guitar and saxophone. Following the recording of one single, they dissolved in November 1963 after which Morrison returned to Belfast. After responding to an advert published in the Belfast Telegraph for musicians to play at a newly opened rhythm and blues club at the Maritime Hotel, Morrison got acquainted with guitarist Billy Harrison, bassist Alan Henderson alongside keyboardist Eric Wrixon; after drummer Ronnie Milling joined the band, Wrixon was inspired by the name Them, based on the movie of the same name. Their first gig at the Maritime Hotel occurred on 10 April 1964.

Writer Clinton Heylin believes that "One Two Brown Eyes" largely originated from jam sessions the band held at the Maritime Hotel, though notes that the lyrics may have been written as early as the summer of 1963, when Morrison composed "Gloria". In a similar vein to "Gloria", Them would often extend performances of "One Two Brown Eyes" upwards of 20 minutes. It was during one such performance that Peter Lloyd, owner of a local recording studio took note of the band. In April of that year, Them recorded a demo for Lloyd that included performances of both "Gloria" and "One Two Brown Eyes"; These recordings caught the attention of Decca Records' A&R man Dick Rowe, who after hearing the tape signed Them to the label. (Note: These demos were first issued on the box set The Complete Them 1964–1967 in 2015.)

Them's first studio session occurred on 5 May 1964 at Decca Studios in London together with Rowe. (Note: Though older sources often state that the recording was done on 5 July 1964, the discovery of the master tapes for the session suggests it was rather held on 5 May 1964 instead. In addition to "One Two Brown Eyes", the session also produced the Morrison compositions "Philosophy" and "Gloria" alongside the covers "Groovin'", "You Can't Judge a Book by its Cover", "Turn On Your Love Light" and "Don't Start Crying Now.") At that point, Them consisted of Morrison (vocals, harmonica), Harrison (guitar), Henderson (bass), Ronnie Milling (drums) and Pat McAuley (keyboards). As the band, particularly Millings and McAuley, were fairly unexperienced in the studio, Rowe brought in session musicians Arthur Greenslade and Bobby Graham to supplement the band on keyboards and drums, respectively. (Note: Greenslade also acted as the session's musical director, and is listed as such on the single release of "Don't Start Crying Now".) Mervyn Solomon believed that Them did not have any issues with including session musicians on the recording, as "they were determined to get on". Turner noted that Milling and Graham played drums simultaneously, rather than having Graham substitute Milling on the instrument entirely. He writes that this is most evident on the stereo mixes of "One Two Brown Eyes" and "Gloria", where two different drum tracks are evidently heard.

== Composition ==
"Other notable songs recorded by Them included the tribal, proto-psychedelic pulse of "One Two Brown Eyes" on which guitarist Billy Harrison used a thimble to get a bottle-neck slide sound."

— Erik Hage (2009)

As recorded by Them, "One Two Brown Eyes" largely surrounds the key of F-sharp minor, a tonality that is never modulated throughout the song's runtime. Multiple authors note the song's sparse instrumentation that largely surrounds the bossa nova beats played by Millings and Graham. Heylin notes that the different drumming styles provide great contrast; Millings uses a simple "tribal beat" on his drum track in contrast to Graham, who performs a beat that "gives the song a calypso aura". According to critic Richie Unterberger, "One Two Brown Eyes" "starts off with a bossa nova-like drum pattern" that is soon augmented with "a descending, circular bass pattern" that anchors the song and is repeated throughout its entirety. For the recording, Harrison used a thimble to emulate the sound of a slide guitar. His performance on the song which consists of "ethereal runs" have led critic Erik Hage to label it "proto-psychedelic".

Unterberger opined Morrison appears to sound much more "menacing" in his vocal delivery during his early career compared to later solo one. He notes that Morrison seemingly seems to "break into tortured wordless scats", something that is amplified after the song's instrumental break "with a yowl suggesting a romantic conquest that's not entirely without undercurrents of struggle"; something that brings a more serious bid to the lyrics. Lyrically, the song are somewhat typical of Morrison's overall writing, with Unterberger noting them to be a "sort of half-extemporized, walking-at-night lyrics that have been among his specialties throughout his career". They tell the story of the narrator stumbling upon a subject with "two hypnotizing brown eyes" that has told lies about Morrison; he reprimands them by "humbling them through cutting them down to his size". Morrison also warns the subject not to stay out at night, something that has been interpreted as an allusion to infidelity.

== Release and reception ==
Rowe and other executives at Decca found the session on 5 May 1964 to only have produced uncommercial songs, something that caused the tapes to be shelved indefinitively. However, after contacting their manager Phil Solomon and complaining to him, Solomon "practically bent Decca to their knees with an ultimatum" that eventually resulted in a single being compiled from the tape. On 4 September 1964, Decca released "Don't Start Crying Now" as Them's debut single in the UK, coupled with "One Two Brown Eyes" on the B-side. (Note: Catalogue number Decca F.11973.) Them were reportedly dismissive of this first release, feeling that the single had been wrongly produced and that an original composition should have appeared on the A-side. Although the single was a big commercial success in Northern Ireland and "quickly became one of the bestselling singles in Belfast record shops", it failed to recreate the same success in mainland UK which caused the single to fail reaching the UK Singles Chart.

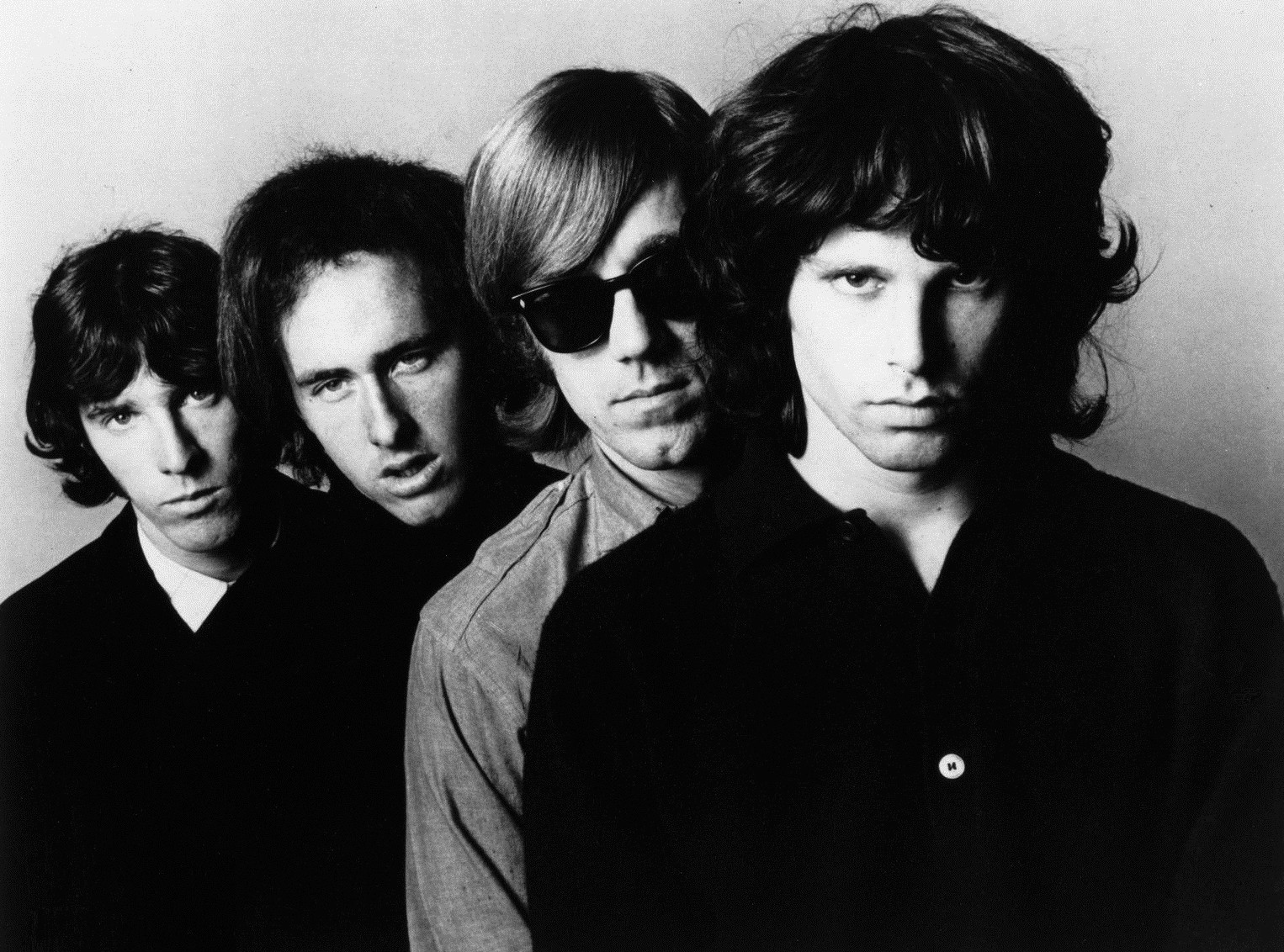
The Doors (pictured in 1966) were influenced by the song for their debut single "Break On Through (To the Other Side)".

"One Two Brown Eyes" became the first composition by Morrison to be publicly released, "spawning a career that has lasted well over 40 years and over a 1000 songs written". Although failing to chart upon initial release in 1964, Decca included it on Them's eponymous EP which was released on 19 February 1965 and reached number 5 on the Record Retailer chart. In the US, "One Two Brown Eyes" was first released in October 1964 through Parrot Records when it was once again issued as the B-side of "Don't Start Crying Now". (Note: Catalogue number 45 PAR 9702.) It was later issued as part of Them's US debut album Here Comes the Night during the summer of 1965. "One Two Brown Eyes" has also appeared on most compilation albums released by Them, including The Story of Them Featuring Van Morrison (1997) and the boxset The Complete Them 1964–1967 (2015).

Although considered to be "obscurely buried" as a B-side, "One Two Brown Eyes" has gone on to receive critical acclaim and influenced other artists; Turner states that the song and it's "psychedelic-esque sound" was probably miles ahead of what other artists were recording in 1964. Heylin believes that the song should've made people shown interest in Morrison's songwriting as "early as 1964", owing to the "strangeness of it". Richie Unterberger instead suggests that it was an influence on the Doors, particularly their 1966 debut single "Break On Through (To the Other Side)". Both of the song have a similar structure, particularly concerning the "bossa nova drum beats" and bass patterns that "come on at roughly the same time in both songs". (Note: Them and the Doors shared billing at the Whisky a Go Go club in May 1966; they allegedly jammed together during Them's last day of residency there.)
