= It's All Over Now, Baby Blue =

1965 song by Bob Dylan

Song by Bob Dylan

from the album Bringing It All Back Home
- Released: March 22, 1965
- Recorded: January 15, 1965
- Studio: Columbia 7th Ave, New York City
- Genre: Folk rock · folk
- Length: 4:12
- Label: Columbia
- Songwriter: Bob Dylan
- Producer: Tom Wilson

Audio sample
- file; help

Official audio
- "It's All Over Now, Baby Blue" by Bob Dylan on YouTube

"It's All Over Now, Baby Blue" is a song written and performed by Bob Dylan and featured on his Bringing It All Back Home album, released on March 22, 1965, by Columbia Records. The song was recorded on January 15, 1965, with Dylan's acoustic guitar and harmonica and William E. Lee's bass guitar the only instrumentation. The lyrics were heavily influenced by Symbolist poetry and bid farewell to the titular "Baby Blue". There has been much speculation about the real life identity of "Baby Blue", with possibilities including Joan Baez, David Blue, Paul Clayton, Dylan's folk music audience, and even Dylan himself.

"It's All Over Now, Baby Blue" has been covered by Them, Baez and the Byrds. Them's version, released in 1966, influenced garage bands during the mid-1960s, and Beck later sampled it for his 1996 single "Jack-Ass". The Byrds recorded the song twice in 1965 as a possible follow-up single to "Mr. Tambourine Man" and "All I Really Want to Do", but neither recording was released in that form. The Byrds did release a 1969 recording of the song on their Ballad of Easy Rider album.

== Bob Dylan's version ==
=== Composition and recording ===
Bob Dylan most likely wrote "It's All Over Now, Baby Blue" in January 1965. The master take of the song was recorded on January 15, 1965, during the sessions for the Bringing It All Back Home album and was produced by Tom Wilson. The track was recorded on the same day Dylan recorded the other three songs on side 2 of the album: "Mr. Tambourine Man", "Gates of Eden" and "It's Alright, Ma (I'm Only Bleeding)". Dylan had been playing those other songs live for some time, allowing them to evolve before recording of the album commenced. For "It's All Over Now, Baby Blue", however, Dylan wanted to record the song before he became too familiar with it. There were at least two studio recordings prior to the one that was released on the album. Dylan recorded a solo acoustic version on January 13, 1965, and a semi-electric version on January 14.

The version of the song on the album is sparsely arranged with Dylan accompanying himself on acoustic guitar and harmonica, with William E. Lee playing bass guitar. Author Clinton Heylin states that the song is another of Dylan's "'go out in the real world' songs, like "To Ramona", though less conciliatory – the tone is crueler and more demanding." As well as being the final track on Bringing It All Back Home, "It's All Over Now, Baby Blue" was also the final song to be recorded for the album.

Bill Janovitz of AllMusic describes the music as beautiful, with folk guitar chord changes and a somber melody, while the chorus, with its line "and it's all over now, Baby Blue" has a heartbreaking quality to it. Like other Dylan songs of the period, such as "Chimes of Freedom" and "Mr. Tambourine Man", the lyrics of "It's All Over Now, Baby Blue" bear the strong influence of Symbolist poets such as Arthur Rimbaud. Lines such as "take what you have gathered from coincidence" reflect the I Ching philosophy that coincidence represents more than mere chance. The song was described by Q magazine as, "The most toxic of strummed kiss-offs, with not a snowball's chance in hell of reconciliation." Dylan, later describing the song, said that "I had carried that song around in my head for a long time and I remember that when I was writing it, I'd remembered a Gene Vincent song. It had always been one of my favorites, Baby Blue... 'When first I met my baby/she said how do you do/she looked into my eyes and said/my name is Baby Blue.' It was one of the songs I used to sing back in high school. Of course, I was singing about a different Baby Blue."

=== Identity of "Baby Blue" ===
Dylan's two previous albums, The Times They Are A-Changin' and Another Side of Bob Dylan both ended with a farewell song, "Restless Farewell" and "It Ain't Me, Babe" respectively. "It's All Over Now, Baby Blue" concludes Bringing It All Back Home in consistent fashion. Much speculation has surrounded who or what the "Baby Blue" to whom Dylan is singing farewell is. Although Dylan himself has remained mute on the subject, Dylan scholars believe that it is probably an amalgam of personalities within Dylan's social orbit. One person who has been regarded as the subject of the song is folk singer Joan Baez. Dylan and Baez were still in a relationship and were planning to tour together, but Dylan may have already been planning to leave the relationship. Another possibility is a singer-songwriter named David Blue. A friend or acquaintance of Dylan's from his days in New York City's Greenwich Village, Blue is pictured on the cover of Dylan and the Band's The Basement Tapes album wearing a trench coat. Yet another possibility is Dylan's one-time friend, folk singer Paul Clayton. Although Clayton had been Dylan's friend throughout 1964, and had accompanied Dylan on the road trip across the United States on which "Chimes of Freedom" and "Mr. Tambourine Man" were written, by 1965 he may have become more devoted to Dylan than Dylan was comfortable with, and Clayton's use of amphetamines may have made him difficult to be around. However, author Paul Williams, in his book Performing Artist: Book One 1960–1973, counters that "Dylan may have been thinking of a particular person as he wrote it, but not necessarily", adding that the song has such a natural, flowing structure to it, that it could "easily have finished writing itself before Dylan got around to thinking about who 'Baby Blue' was." According to the lyrics, any candidate was either female or gay: "Your lover ... has taken all his blankets ..".

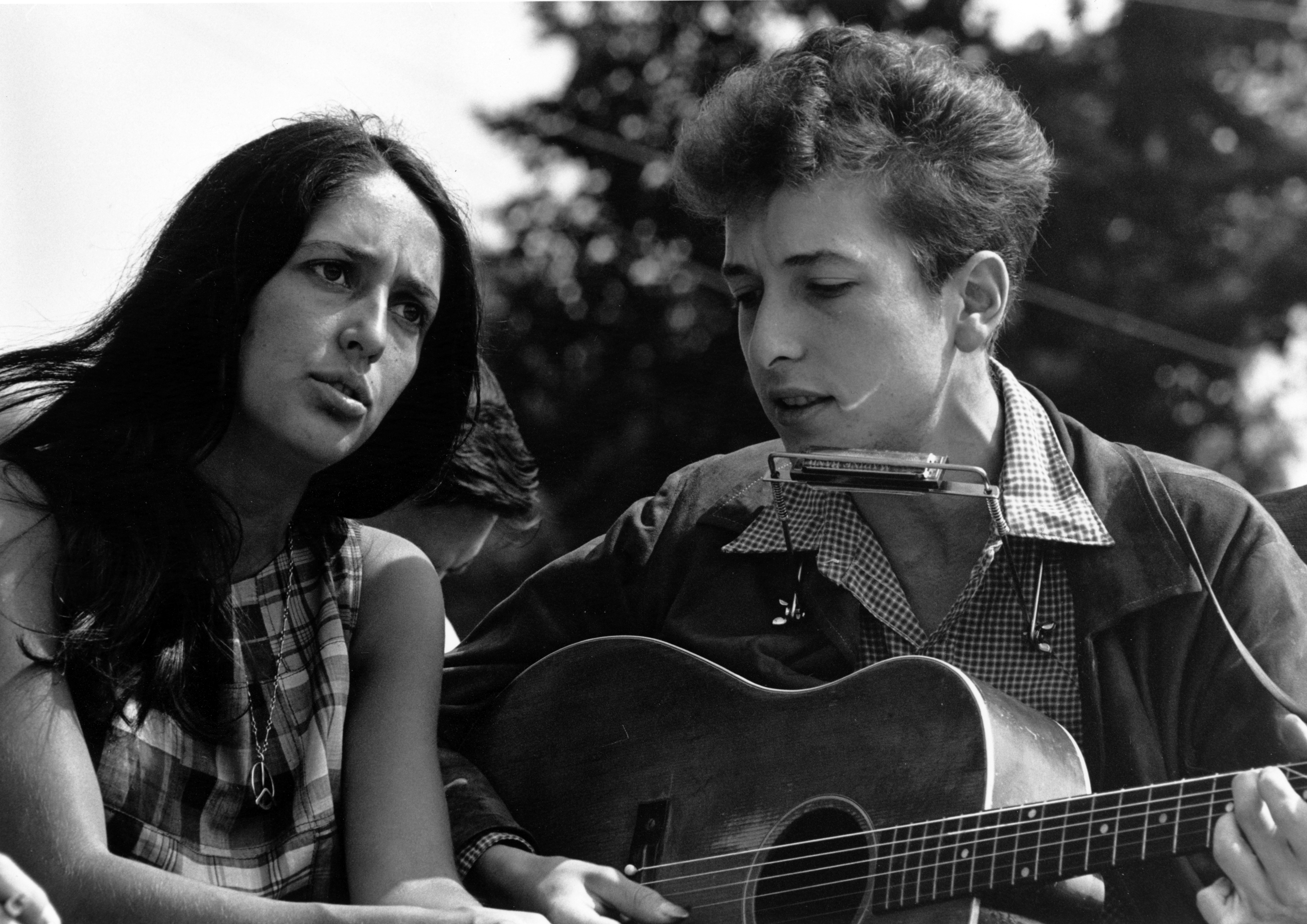
1963 photo of Joan Baez, left, who has sometimes been regarded as the subject of the song and also covered it, with Bob Dylan, who wrote the song

Another interpretation of the song is that it is directed at Dylan's folk music audience. The song was written at a time when he was moving away from the folk protest movement musically and, as such, can be seen as a farewell to his days as an acoustic guitar-playing protest singer. Dylan's choice of performing "It's All Over Now, Baby Blue" as his last acoustic song at the infamous Newport Folk Festival of 1965, after having had his electric set met with boos, is often used as evidence to support this theory. That particular performance of the song is included in Murray Lerner's film The Other Side of the Mirror.

Yet another interpretation is that Dylan is directing the farewell to himself, particularly his acoustic performer self. The opening line "You must leave now" can be a command, similar to the line "Go away from my window" that opens "It Ain't Me, Babe". But it can also be an imperative, meaning just that it is necessary that you leave. And the song is as much about new beginnings as it is about endings. The song not only notes the requirement that Baby Blue leave, but also includes the hope that Baby Blue will move forward, in lines such as "Strike another match, go start anew".

Alternatively, the vagabond and "stepping stones" referenced in the song have been interpreted as Dylan's folk audience whom he needs to leave behind. He would also be telling himself to "Forget the dead you've left, they will not follow you." Others to whom he may be saying farewell in the song are any of the women he had known, the political left or to the illusions of his youth.

=== Legacy ===
“After hearing for some weeks Dylan’s song ‘It’s All Over Now, Baby Blue,’ and having read about a killer in some Southwestern state, and having thoughts about the old legends and folk songs of Death and the Maiden, the story came to more or less in a piece.”—Joyce Carol Oates, on her inspiration for writing Where Are You Going, Where Have You Been, dedicated to Bob Dylan.

In addition to appearing on the Bringing It All Back Home album, "It's All Over Now, Baby Blue" was also included on the compilation albums Bob Dylan's Greatest Hits Vol. II (1971), The Essential Bob Dylan (2000), Dylan (2007), and the UK version of Bob Dylan's Greatest Hits (1967). Dylan played the song for Donovan in his hotel room during his May 1965 tour of England in a scene shown in the 1967 D. A. Pennebaker documentary Dont Look Back. The first studio take of the song, recorded on January 13, 1965, was released in 2005 on The Bootleg Series Vol. 7: No Direction Home, the soundtrack to Martin Scorsese's documentary No Direction Home, and again in 2015 on the 6-disc and 18-disc versions of The Bootleg Series Vol. 12: The Cutting Edge 1965–1966.

As of December 2024, Dylan had performed the song live 588 times. A live version from Dylan's May 17, 1966, concert in Manchester, England (popularly but mistakenly known as the Royal Albert Hall concert) was released in 1985 on Dylan's box set Biograph and subsequently included on The Bootleg Series Vol. 4: Bob Dylan Live 1966, The "Royal Albert Hall" Concert. A live version from December 1975, recorded during the first Rolling Thunder Revue tour, is contained on The Bootleg Series Vol. 5: Bob Dylan Live 1975, The Rolling Thunder Revue (2002) and The Rolling Thunder Revue: The 1975 Live Recordings (2019).

In a 2005 readers' poll reported in Mojo, "It's All Over Now, Baby Blue" was listed as the number 10 all-time best Bob Dylan song, and a similar poll of artists ranked the song number 7. In 2002, Uncut listed it as the number 11 all-time best Bob Dylan song.

== Them version ==
"It's All Over Now, Baby Blue"
- 1966 Dutch picture sleeve

Single by Them

from the album Them Again
- B-side: "I'm Gonna Dress in Black" (Holland); "Bad or Good" (Germany)
- Released: October 1966 (Holland); December 1973 (Germany)
- Recorded: 1965
- Studio: Decca, London
- Genre: Rock, folk rock
- Length: 3:50
- Label: Decca
- Songwriter: Bob Dylan
- Producer: Tommy Scott

Audio sample
- file; help

The Belfast band Them (featuring Van Morrison) recorded a cover of "It's All Over Now, Baby Blue" that was first released on their album, Them Again, in January 1966 in the UK and April 1966 in the U.S. The song was subsequently issued as a single (b/w "I'm Gonna Dress in Black") in the Netherlands during October 1966 but failed to reach the Dutch Singles Chart. It was released as a single in Germany, first entering the charts in February 1974 and peaking at number 13, during a chart stay of 14 weeks.

Morrison recalled his first encounter with Dylan's music in an interview in 2000: "I think I heard [The Freewheelin' Bob Dylan] in a record shop in Smith Street. And I just thought it was just incredible that this guy's not singing about 'moon in June' and he's getting away with it... The subject matter wasn't pop songs, ya know, and I thought this kind of opens the whole thing up." Morrison's record producer at the time, Bert Berns, encouraged him to find models for his songs, so he bought Dylan's Bringing It All Back Home album in March 1965. One of the songs on the album held a unique fascination for Morrison and he soon started performing "It's All Over Now, Baby Blue" in small clubs and pubs as a solo artist (without Them).

Producer Tommy Scott was conscious of the importance of Dylan's music on the current pop scene and was eager for Morrison to cover "It's All Over Now, Baby Blue" during the 1965 sessions for Them's second LP. After a failed, preliminary attempt to record the track with session pianist Phil Coulter at Regent Sound studios in London, Scott reconsidered his approach to the song. Scott recalled in interview that "The number wasn't going down, Van wasn't sure. Then the guys said he didn't fancy it and thought it was cheap because I'd tried to go after the "Here Comes the Night" tempo." The band returned to the song during a later session at Decca's recording studios. Scott decided to rearrange the song's musical backing, incorporating a distinctive recurring blues riff and piano work from Them's keyboard player, Peter Bardens, resulting in a finished recording that the band were satisfied with. The song featured one of Morrison's most expressive vocals and included subtle changes to Dylan's lyrics; instead of singing "Forget the dead you've left" Morrison alters the line to "Forget the debts you've left".

Greil Marcus stated in a 1969 Rolling Stone review that "Only on Dylan's 'It's All Over Now, Baby Blue' does Van truly shatter all the limits on his special powers...Each note stands out as a special creation – 'the centuries of emotion that go into a musician’s choice from one note to the next' is a phrase that describes the startling depth of this recording. Played very fast, Van's voice virtually fighting for control over the band, 'Baby Blue' emerges as music that is both dramatic and terrifying." In 2003, author Clinton Heylin called Them's 1966 recording of the song a "genuine rarity, a Dylan cover to match the original." After Van Morrison left the band in 1966, Them spinoff group, The Belfast Gypsies, recorded a cover of the song on their 1967 album, Them Belfast Gypsies.

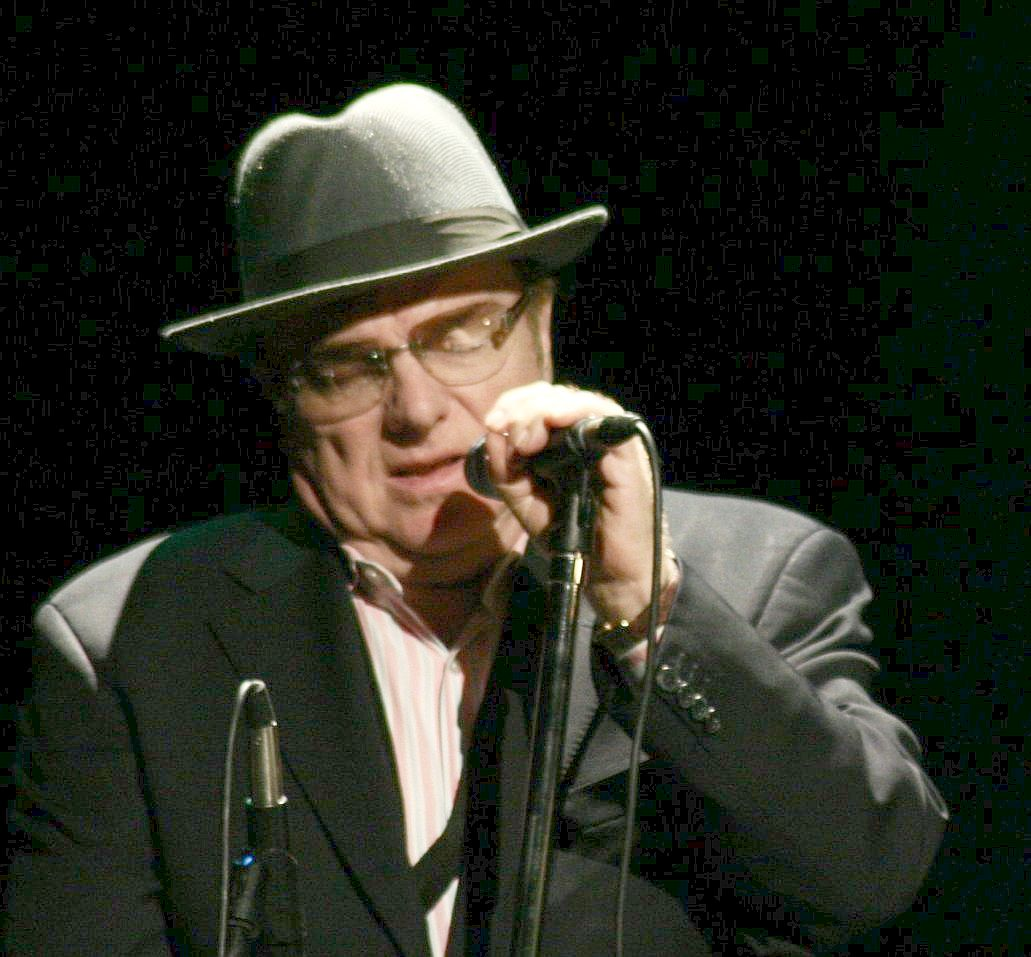
Van Morrison covered "It's All Over Now, Baby Blue" both as a member of Them and as a solo artist.

Them's interpretation of the song, with Morrison as vocalist, became influential during the years 1966 and 1967, with several garage rock bands, including The 13th Floor Elevators, The Chocolate Watchband and The West Coast Pop Art Experimental Band, recording versions of the song that were indebted to Them's cover version. The song as recorded by Them was also a staple of The Grateful Dead sets in 1966. Beck used a sample of Them's 1966 recording of "It's All Over Now, Baby Blue" as the basis for his single "Jack-Ass", which appeared on his 1996 album, Odelay (see 1996 in music). Insane Clown Posse later sampled Beck's song as the basis for "Another Love Song", which appeared on their 1999 album, The Amazing Jeckel Brothers. Hole's cover of the song also uses Them's recording as a blueprint. Them's original 1966 version of the song has appeared in the 2000 film Girl, Interrupted.

In 1993, Van Morrison included Them's cover of the song on his compilation album The Best of Van Morrison Volume Two. In addition to recording "It's All Over Now, Baby Blue" with Them, Morrison has covered the song frequently in concert throughout his solo career, beginning in 1974, but has never released a studio or live recording of it as a solo artist. In 1984, Morrison made a guest appearance at one of Bob Dylan's concerts in London and the two musicians performed a duet of "It's All Over Now, Baby Blue". Morrison and Dylan also sang a duet of "It's All Over Now, Baby Blue" at the final concert of Dylan's 1984 tour on July 8, 1984, at Slane Castle, Ireland.

In a 2009 Paste magazine readers, writers and editors poll of the 50 Best Bob Dylan Covers of All Time, Them's version of "It's All Over Now, Baby Blue" was ranked at number 28.

== The Byrds version ==
"It's All Over Now, Baby Blue"
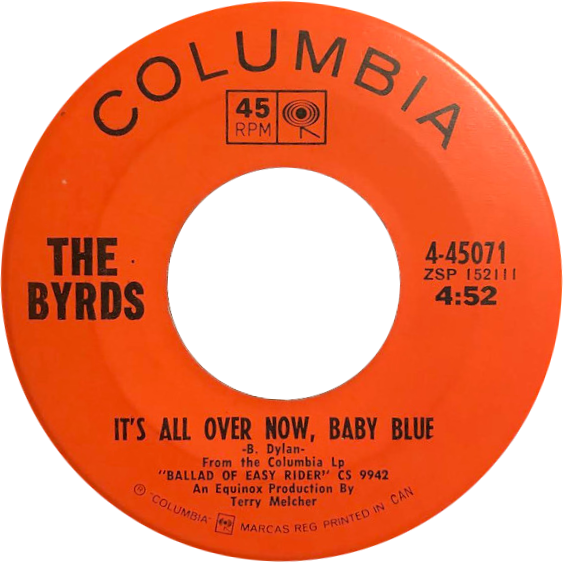
- Canadian single of the Byrds recording

Single by the Byrds

from the album Ballad of Easy Rider
- A-side: "Jesus Is Just Alright"
- Released: October 29, 1969
- Recorded: July 22, 1969
- Studio: Columbia, Hollywood, California
- Genre: Folk rock, country rock
- Length: 4:53
- Label: Columbia
- Songwriter: Bob Dylan
- Producer: Terry Melcher

Audio
- "It's All Over Now, Baby Blue" (from Ballad of Easy Rider) by the Byrds on YouTube
- "It's All Over Now, Baby Blue" (first version) by the Byrds on YouTube

The Byrds' recording of "It's All Over Now, Baby Blue" first saw release on October 29, 1969, as part of the band's Ballad of Easy Rider album. The song also appeared on the B-side of the band's December 1969 single, "Jesus Is Just Alright", which reached number 97 on the Billboard Hot 100 chart.

The Byrds had previously attempted to record the song on two separate occasions, some four years earlier, during studio sessions for their second album, Turn! Turn! Turn! At that time, the Byrds planned to release "It's All Over Now, Baby Blue" as a follow-up to their previous hit Bob Dylan covers, "Mr. Tambourine Man" and "All I Really Want to Do". The band's first attempt at recording the song was on June 28, 1965: resulting in an irreverent, garage rock style take on the song. This version was deemed unsatisfactory and remained unreleased for 22 years, until its inclusion on the Never Before album in 1987. The June 28, 1965, recording can also be heard on the 1996 expanded reissue of Turn! Turn! Turn!, as well as on The Byrds and There Is a Season box sets.

The band attempted a second recording of the song during late August 1965. A program director from KRLA, who was present at the recording sessions, was impressed enough to play an acetate disc of the track on air, plugging it as the Byrds' new single. However, the Byrds soon abandoned the idea of releasing "It's All Over Now, Baby Blue" and instead issued "Turn! Turn! Turn!" as their third single. The Byrds' August 1965 version of "It's All Over Now, Baby Blue" has never been officially released.

Guitarist and band leader, Roger McGuinn, returned to the composition during a July 22, 1969, recording session for the band's Ballad of Easy Rider album. He decided to slow down the tempo and radically alter the song's arrangement to fashion a more somber and serious version than those that the Byrds recorded in 1965. In tandem with the slower tempo, the band dragged the syllables of each word out to emphasize the world-weariness of the song's lyric. Ultimately, McGuinn was dissatisfied with the recording of the song included on Ballad of Easy Rider, feeling that it tended to drag within the context of the album. In addition to appearing on Ballad of Easy Rider, the Byrds' 1969 recording of "It's All Over Now, Baby Blue" can also be found on the compilation albums The Byrds Play Dylan and The Very Best of The Byrds.

== Other covers ==
External media

Audio
- "It's All Over Now, Baby Blue" (recorded in 1971) by Marianne Faithful, from Rich Kid Blues (1985) on YouTube
- "It's All Over Now, Baby Blue" (2018 re-recording) by Marianna Faithful on YouTube

Video
- "It's All Over Now, Baby Blue" (1965; official visualizer) by Joan Baez on YouTube

Many other artists have covered the song. Joan Baez covered it on her 1965 album Farewell, Angelina. It is one of four Dylan covers on that album, the others being the title track, "Mama, You Been on My Mind" (recorded as "Daddy, You Been on My Mind"), and "A Hard Rain's a-Gonna Fall". Baez sings "It's All Over Now, Baby Blue" in a falsetto voice. Baez continued to perform the song at live concerts as of 2005.

In 1971, Marianne Faithfull recorded a version of "It's All Over Now, Baby Blue", which was first released on the 1985 archival album, Rich Kid Blues. Stacia Proefrock of AllMusic wrote that this version "aches with sadness". In 2018, Faithfull recorded the song again for her album Negative Capability.

In 1973 the song was covered by Manfred Mann's Earth Band. Record World called this version a "fine treatment." Graham Bonnet recorded a cover version of the song, which entered the Australian Top 100 chart in August 1977 and peaked at number 3 in November that year. In 1977, The Animals recorded a cover of the song for their album Before We Were So Rudely Interrupted. Link Wray covered the song in 1979 for his Bullshot album. Neil Young commented that this version "can make you forget Bob Dylan's ever existed".

The Milltown Brothers covered the song in 1993, spending two weeks on the UK pop charts, peaking at number 48. In 2021, Rolling Stone magazine put the version by the 13th Floor Elevators in ninth position in their '80 Greatest Dylan Covers of All Time' article.

George Harrison, who co-wrote the song "I'd Have You Anytime" with Dylan in November 1968, and later performed with Dylan in the Traveling Wilburys, referenced the title in his 1987 single, "When We Was Fab". One of the lyrics in the song reads "But it's all over now, baby blue". The song was a source of inspiration for Joyce Carol Oates' short story "Where Are You Going, Where Have You Been?", prompting her to dedicate the story to Dylan.

== Sources ==
- Muscatine, Charles and Griffith, Marlene. 1980. The Borzoi College Reader. Fourth edition. Alfred A. Knopf, New York. ISBN 0-394-32419-6
