= Don't Look Back (John Lee Hooker song) =

Single by John Lee Hooker
- A-side: "Send Me Your Pillow"
- B-side: "Don't Look Back"
- Released: 1964
- Genre: R&B, Blues
- Label: Vee Jay Records
- Songwriter: John Lee Hooker

John Lee Hooker singles chronology
"I'm Leaving" (1963)	"Don't Look Back" (1964)	"Big Legs, Tight Skirt" (1965)

"Don't Look Back" is a song written by blues singer-songwriter John Lee Hooker, and released as a single in 1964. As a duet, Hooker later performed the song with the Northern Irish singer-songwriter Van Morrison. It was a Grammy Award winner in Best Pop Collaboration with Vocals in 1998 from the album, Don't Look Back.

== Song history ==
This song had a long history with Hooker and Morrison over the years. It was covered by Van Morrison's band Them on their debut album, The Angry Young Them in 1965. The album's sleeve had a comment on the song which read: "John Lee Hooker hailed as one of the greatest R&B singers in the world wrote 'Don't Look Back'....Perhaps it isn't so extraordinary that this soulful ballad sounds uncannily like a Morrison original as the two men have a lot in common." Them's version was also included in songs hand-picked by Morrison on his second greatest hit album, The Best of Van Morrison Volume Two. A live performance in 1979 was also one of the songs featured on Van Morrison's video Van Morrison in Ireland in 1981.

== Cover versions ==
The Australian group The Black Sorrows covered the song for their debut studio album, Sonola (1984).
