= Bessie Mae Smith =

American blues singer

- Also known as: St. Louis Bessie, Blue Belle
- Genres: Classic female blues
- Occupations: Singer, songwriter
- Years active: 1927–1941

Bessie Mae Smith was an American blues singer from St. Louis, who recorded for the Okeh, Vocalion and Paramount record labels under a variety of names between 1927 and 1941. She is reported to have been married to Delta bluesman Big Joe Williams, who sometimes credited her with writing his song “Baby, Please Don't Go”. Her songs often included surreal imagery and sexual metaphors.

There is confusion about her actual name. While she recorded as Bessie Mae Smith, Blue Belle, and St. Louis Bessie, and probably also as Mae Belle Miller and Streamline Mae, her file at Okeh Records listed her as Bessie Martin, a track recorded for Paramount was reissued as by Sara Carter, and songs recorded under the name Streamline Mae have the composer credited as Mary Belle Smith. Her former husband Big Joe Williams, however, stated that her name was Bessie Mae Smith.

She is not to be confused with classic blues singer Bessie Smith.
