= Tommy Scott (Scottish musician) =

Scottish songwriter, producer and singer (born 1940)

- Born: Thomas Kilpatrick; 1940 (age 85–86); Glasgow, Scotland
- Occupations: Musician songwriter record producer
- Years active: 1960s–1990s
- Labels: Decca Records; Major Minor Records; Scotdisc

Thomas Kilpatrick (born 1940), known as Tommy Scott, is a Scottish songwriter, producer and singer. As a songwriter and producer in the 1960s and 1970s he had numerous hits in pop, rock, and folk styles; including records with Them, The Dubliners, Sydney Devine, Twinkle, and Lena Zavaroni. From the 1980s onwards, he has sung and recorded traditional Scottish music.

== Biography ==
Scott worked in Glasgow's shipyards, before a musical career which has included touring with The White Heather Club and Jimmy Shand, and recordings including total sales of over a million.

An early success was Eden Kane's 1964 hit single "Boys Cry" (UK No. 8), written by Scott and Buddy Kaye. A French version, "Les Garçons Pleurent (Boys Cry)", was a No. 5 hit for Richard Anthony.

In the mid-1960s in London, Scott began producing for Decca Records' Dick Rowe, and worked closely with manager Phil Solomon and writer/arranger Phil Coulter. At Decca, Scott produced two albums by Them, featuring Van Morrison, but not their hit singles, which were produced by Rowe, or Bert Berns.

The 1966 song "I Can Only Give You Everything", written with Coulter and produced for Them, has become a garage rock staple; with covers by The Troggs, MC5, Richard Hell, and many others. Beck played the signature guitar riff for his hit song "Devils Haircut" (1996), and gave co-credit to Scott and Coulter.

He became a house producer for Solomon's Major Minor Records, and formed the 'Scott Solomon' production company with him.

In 1968, he and conductor Arthur Greenslade teamed up as the 'Artie Scott Orchestra', issuing one album, and the novelty single "March of the Skinheads" (1970).

In 1976, Scott collaborated with Tom Parker of Apollo 100 as the 'Plaid Pops Orchestra', recording their own Scottish themed tunes.

Sydney Devine had a hit in 1978 with "Scotland Forever", written and produced by Tommy Scott. By the 1980s, Scott turned his efforts to performing and recording traditional Scottish music on the Scotdisc label, and his own songs, including "Scotland Forever".

== Selective discography ==
=== Singles ===
Year	Song title	Artist	Singles chart	Writer(s)	Producer(s)
1962	"Angela" c/w "Did You"	Jay and Tommy Scott		Jay & Tommy Scott (both sides)	Tony Meehan
1964	"Who Will It Be" c/w "If It's Me That You Want"	Tommy Scott		Les Vandyke; B-side: Scott	Michael Barclay
1964	"Boys Cry"	Eden Kane	UK No. 8	Scott, Buddy Kaye	Les Reed
1964	"Les Garçons Pleurent (Boy's Cry)"	Richard Anthony	France No. 5	Scott, Kaye, Jacques Chaumelle	Ivor Raymonde
1964	"Beneath the Willow Tree"; B-side of "Wouldn't Trade You for the World"	The Bachelors	UK No. 4, US No. 69	Scott, Bill Martin.	Dick Rowe
1964	"Oh, Samuel Don’t Die"; B-side of "No Arms Can Ever Hold You"	The Bachelors	UK No. 7, US No. 27	Scott, Martin	Noel Walker
1964	"Terry" c/w "Take Me to the Dance"	Twinkle	UK No. 4	Twinkle; B-side: Scott	Scott
1965	"Golden Lights" c/w "Ain't Nobody Home but Me"	Twinkle	UK No. 21	Twinkle; B-side: Scott	Scott
1965	"All For Myself"; B-side of "Here Comes the Night"	Them	UK No. 2, US No. 24	Van Morrison	Scott
1965	"One More Time" c/w "How Long Baby"	Them		Van Morrison; B-side: Scott	Scott
1965	"I'm Gonna Dress In Black"; B-side of "(It Won't Hurt) Half As Much"	Them		Scott	Scott
1965	"Mystic Eyes"	Them	US No. 33	Van Morrison	Scott
1966	"I Can Only Give You Everything"	Them		Scott, Phil Coulter	Scott
1966	"Call My Name"	Them		Scott	Scott
1966	"Richard Cory" c/w "Don't You Know"	Them		Paul Simon; B-side: Scott	Scott
1966	"Boys Cry" c/w "I Can Only Give You Everything"	Tommy Scott		Scott, Kaye; B-side: Scott, Coulter	Michael Barclay
1966	"Beautiful Dreams" c/w "I Need Your Hand In Mine"	Twiggy		Scott, Peter Law; B-side: Scott	Scott
1966	"I Can Only Give You Everything"	The Haunted	CAN No. 62	Scott, Coulter	Don Wayne
1966	"Tu Es Impossible" (I Can Only Give You Everything)	Les Sultans	CAN No. 21 (in French)	(uncredited: Scott, Coulter), Bruce Huard	Denis Pantis
1967	"Story Of Them Part 1"	Them		Van Morrison	Scott
1967	"Oh How I Miss You"	The Bachelors	UK No. 30	Scott	Scott
1967	"Seven Drunken Nights"	The Dubliners	UK No. 7, IRE No. 1	Arr. The Dubliners	Scott
1967	"The Black Velvet Band"	The Dubliners	UK No. 15, IRE No. 4	Arr. The Dubliners	Scott
1967	"All For Me Grog"	The Dubliners	IRE No. 10	Arr. The Dubliners	Scott
1967	"Maids When You're Young"	The Dubliners	UK No. 43, IRE No. 11	Arr. The Dubliners	Scott
1967	"I Can Only Give You Everything"	MC5		Scott, Coulter	Arnold Mark Geller
1968	"Dirty Old Town"	The Dubliners	UK No. 43, IRE No. 10	Ewan MacColl	Scott
1968	"May I Have The Next Dream With You"	Malcolm Roberts	UK No. 8	Charles & Harry Tobias	Scott
1969	"Love Is All"	Malcolm Roberts	UK No. 12, US No. 40	Les Reed, Barry Mason	Scott
1969	"Nobody's Child" c/w "Oh How I Miss You"	Karen Young	UK No. 6	Cy Coben, Mel Foree; B-side: Scott	Scott
1969	"The Deal" c/w "The Mission"	Pat Campbell	UK No. 31	D. Miles, K. Herston, B. Prather; B-side: Campbell, Scott	Scott
1974	"It's All Over Now, Baby Blue"	Them	GER No. 13	Bob Dylan	Scott
1974	"Ma! (He's Making Eyes At Me)"	Lena Zavaroni	UK No. 10, US No. 91	Sidney Clare, Con Conrad	Scott
1974	"(You've Got) Personality" c/w "Schools Out"	Lena Zavaroni	UK No. 33	Lloyd Price, Harold Logan; B-side: Scott	Scott
1976	"From Scotland With Love" c/w "Home of Mine"	Plaid Pops Orchestra		Scott, Tom Parker	Scott
1978	"Scotland Forever" c/w "The Flower of Scotland"	Sydney Devine	UK No. 48	Scott; B-side: Scott	Scott
1980	"Tommy Scott's Hop.Scotch Ceilidh Party"	Tommy Scott		Arr. Scott	Scott
1996	"Devils Haircut"	Beck	UK No. 22, US No. 94, CAN No. 19	Hansen, King, Simpson, Scott, Coulter, Wright	Beck, Dust Brothers

=== Albums/album tracks ===
Year	Title	Artist	Albums Chart	Tommy Scott's role
1964	Sing Along With Beatles' Songs	Tommy Scott and the Boys		Performer
1965	The Angry Young Them	Them		Produced 10 tracks, wrote one
1966	Them Again	Them	UK No. 21, US No. 138	Produced all tracks, wrote four
1966	Scottish Nationalist Songs	Nigel Denver		Producer
1967	A Drop of the Hard Stuff	The Dubliners	UK No. 5, IRE No. 1	Producer
1967	More of the Hard Stuff	The Dubliners	UK No. 8, IRE No. 1	Producer
1967	"I Can Only Give You Everything" (on the album Trogglodynamite)	The Troggs	UK No. 10	Written by Scott/Coulter
1968	Soul Buster!	Joe E. Young & The Toniks		Producer
1969	Nobody's Child	Karen Young		Produced all tracks, wrote two
1974	Ma! He's Making Eyes At Me	Lena Zavaroni	UK No. 8	Produced all tracks, wrote two
1975	The Elephant Song	Kamahl	NED No. 1, SWE No. 3	Scott produced 2 tracks
1975	If I Give My Heart To You (UK version)	Kamahl		Produced all tracks, wrote one
1976	Doubly Devine	Sydney Devine	UK No. 14	Produced all tracks, wrote two
1976	Devine Time	Sydney Devine	UK No. 49	Produced all tracks, wrote two
1977	From Scotland With Love	Plaid Pops Orchestra		Produced all tracks, wrote six Collaboration with Tom Parker
1977	"I'm Gonna Dress In Black" (on the album Livin In The Fast Lane, aka Off The Rails)	Little Bob Story		Written by Scott
1979	"I Can Only Give You Everything" (on the album Live)	Little Bob Story		Written by Scott/Coulter
1980	Hop.Scotch Ceilidh Party	Tommy Scott		Singer, arranger, producer
1982	"I Can Only Give You Everything" (on the album Destiny Street)	Richard Hell and the Voidoids		Written by Scott/Coulter
1983	Tommy Scott’s; Pipes and Strings of Scotland	Tommy Scott		Singer, arranger, producer
1996	"Devils Haircut" (on the album Odelay)	Beck	UK No. 17, US No. 16	Credited co-writer of "Devils Haircut”
2007	"Chante" (on the album Nouvelle Vague)	Sylvie Vartan	FR No. 21	Co-writer of "Chante" (a version of "I Can Only Give You Everything")
