= Here Comes the Night =

1964 song

Single by Them
- B-side: "All for Myself"
- Released: 5 March 1965
- Recorded: October 1964
- Studio: Decca Studios, West Hampstead, London
- Genre: Pop rock; R&B; garage rock; pop
- Length: 2:44
- Label: Decca
- Songwriter: Bert Berns
- Producer: Bert Berns

Them singles chronology
"Baby, Please Don't Go" (1964)	"Here Comes the Night" (1965)	"One More Time" (1965)

"Here Comes the Night" is a 1964 song, written by Bert Berns. It became a hit for Northern Irish band Them, fronted by Van Morrison, in March 1965, charting at No. 2 in the UK, No. 8 in Canada, and No. 24 in the US. Them's single is listed at either No. 33 or No. 36 in the Top 100 best-selling UK singles during the calendar year 1965, depending on source.

The song was originally released as a single in both the UK and the US. by another Decca Records' artiste, Lulu, in November 1964. Lulu's recording charted at No. 50 in the UK, and failed to chart at all in the US.

== Recording and history ==
Them's version of the song was the second Them track produced by Bert Berns and the first occasion that Them recorded one of his compositions. It was recorded in a session at Decca Studios in West Hampstead, London in October 1964 along with "Baby, Please Don't Go" and "All For Myself".

Jimmy Page played guitar on this arrangement. Andy White and Tommy Scott performed backing vocals with Phil Coulter on keyboards. Drummer Ronnie Millings recalled that the band worked on the song at the studio with rehearsals lasting four days. [Billy Harrison noted that "I remember sitting in Decca when Bert said he had this song, and he came out with "Here Comes the Night". He had a riff and that's all he had, and we sat and we worked on it, and we came up with what you hear. We worked at it sitting in the studio—but no engineers or anything." Phil Coulter later said, "I knew I'd heard a smash. It was the first time I'd ever heard a hit record in its emerging state."

According to Phil Coulter the band had intended this song to be the follow-up to "Baby, Please Don't Go" but Decca rush-released a recording of the song by Lulu in November 1964. The band members of Them were said to be bitterly disappointed by this decision made by Decca and Phil Solomon. Phil Coulter remarked: "They bitched to me a lot but they wouldn't dare to have said anything to Solomon." The band was said to have a "certain grim satisfaction" as Lulu's recording reached No. 50 and then dropped off the chart.

Despite a bold, breezy tone the song's lyrics tell a tale of obsessive jealousy and approaching loneliness from the point of view of a rejected lover who voyeuristically watches the new couple.

"Here Comes the Night" was Them's third single in both the UK and the US; the US release following the success of "Gloria" in that market. The first day of its release it sold 16,000 copies, at the time an impressive showing. It peaked at No. 2 in the UK, No. 8 in Canada, and No. 24 in the US, spending 10 weeks on the US chart. It was also released on the EP Mystic Eyes. After the record was released, Them was immediately sent on a public relations push with television appearances on Ready Steady Go! and Top of the Pops.

Van Morrison has remarked on this:

Them were never meant to be on Top of the Pops, I mean miming? Lip syncing? We used to laugh at the programme, think it was a joke. Then we were on it ourselves. It was ridiculous. We were totally anti that type of thing. We were really into the blues... and we had to get into suits and have make-up put on and all that..

"Here Comes The Night" also achieved chart success in other countries worldwide; for example, it reached No. 17 on the Kent Music Report in Australia, and peaked at No. 2 on the Irish Singles Chart. As of 2026, it remains the highest-charting single for Van Morrison in both the United Kingdom and Ireland, as he has never had a No. 1 single in either country. The song was released on the Parrot (US) version of the album THEM in July 1965, and also appears on the album The Story of Them. It was also re-released on the Deram label in 1973, but did not chart.

Billboard described the single as an "intriguing teen rouser with an equally intriguing vocal performance." Cash Box described it as "a funky, twangy blues-tinged opus with an infectious rhythmic back-beat."

== Appearance on other Van Morrison albums ==
- Having gone on to a solo career, Morrison revisited "Here Comes the Night" on his live album It's Too Late to Stop Now (1974). This rendition is augmented by a string section.
- The original studio version was included in the 1990 compilation The Best of Van Morrison.
- Stereo version is included on The Story of Them Featuring Van Morrison (1997).
- Included on the compilation CD Still on Top – The Greatest Hits (2007).

== Other versions ==
"Here Comes the Night"

Single by Lulu
- B-side: "That's Really Some Good"
- Released: November 1964
- Label: Decca
- Songwriter: Bert Berns
- Producer: Bert Berns

Lulu singles chronology
"Try to Understand" (1964)	"Here Comes the Night" (1964)	"Satisfied" (1965)

The song, sung by Scottish singer Lulu, was first released as a single by Decca Records in the UK and Parrot Records in the US in November 1964. Lulu's recording charted at No. 50 in the UK.

- The Exciters (1965). A slight variation of the song, named "There They Go". Released on Roulette 4632.
- David Bowie (1973). On his covers album Pin Ups.
- Streetheart (1979) Under Heaven Over Hell (No. 60 in Canada).
- The Rivals (1980). A punk version. The Rivals thought they were covering a David Bowie song.
- Native (1994). A reggae version. Featured in the film (and soundtrack to) Ace Ventura: When Nature Calls.
- Dwight Yoakam (1997). On his covers album Under the Covers.
- The Fabulous Thunderbirds (1995), on the album Roll of the Dice.
- Rod Stewart (2013), on the special edition of the album Time.
- South African bands All Night Radio and Big Sky have both covered the song.
- Pate Mustajärvi (1988), titled "Taas iskee yö" in Finnish on his album Lago Nero.
