= Them Again =

Studio album by Them
- Released: 21 January 1966
- Genre: Rock; rhythm and blues; garage rock
- Length: 44:45
- Label: Decca
- Producer: Tommy Scott

Them chronology
The Angry Young Them (1965)	Them Again (1966)	Belfast Gypsies (1967)

US edition
- Parrot Records (1966)

Them Again is the second album by the Northern Irish band Them, fronted by lead singer and songwriter Van Morrison. The album was released by Decca Records in the UK on 21 January 1966, but it failed to chart. In the U.S., the album was released with somewhat different tracks in April 1966 and it peaked at number 138 on the Billboard chart.

== Critical reception ==
Professional ratings
Review scores
Source	Rating
AllMusic	3.5/5 stars
Record Mirror	4/5 stars

In a review for AllMusic, critic Brude Eder writes:

The group's second and, for all intents and purposes, last full album was recorded while Them was in a state of imminent collapse ... The 16 songs here are a little less focused than the first LP. The material was cut under siege conditions, with a constantly shifting lineup and a grueling tour schedule; essentially, there was no "group" to provide focus to the sound, only Morrison's voice, so the material bounces [from song to song].

Author Clinton Heylin considers the cover version of Bob Dylan's "It's All Over Now, Baby Blue" to be "that genuine rarity, a Dylan cover to match the original".

== Track listing ==
=== Decca (UK) edition ===
==== Side one ====
1. "Could You, Would You" (Van Morrison) – 3:15
2. "Something You Got" (Chris Kenner) – 2:36
3. "Call My Name" (Tommy Scott) – 2:23
4. "Turn On Your Love Light" (Deadric Malone, Joseph Wade Scott) – 2:18
5. "I Put a Spell on You" (Screamin' Jay Hawkins) – 2:40
6. "I Can Only Give You Everything" (Phil Coulter, Tommy Scott) – 2:43
7. "My Lonely Sad Eyes" (Van Morrison) – 2:27
8. "I Got a Woman" (Ray Charles, Renald Richard) – 3:16

==== Side two ====
1. "Out of Sight" (Ted Wright a.k.a. James Brown) – 2:26
2. "It's All Over Now, Baby Blue" (Bob Dylan) – 3:52
3. "Bad or Good" (Van Morrison) – 2:09
4. "How Long Baby" (M. Gillon a.k.a. Tommy Scott) – 3:41
5. "Hello Josephine" (Dave Bartholomew, Fats Domino) – 2:06
6. "Don't You Know" (Tommy Scott) – 2:26
7. "Hey Girl" (Van Morrison) – 2:59
8. "Bring 'em On In" (Van Morrison) – 3:46

=== Parrot (US) edition ===
==== Side one ====
1. "Could You, Would You" (Morrison) – 3:13
2. "Something You Got" (Chris Kenner) – 2:35
3. "Call My Name" (Tommy Scott) – 2:22
4. "Turn on Your Love Light" (Deadric Malone, Joseph Wade Scott) – 2:22
5. "I Can Only Give You Everything" (Phil Coulter, Tommy Scott) – 2:43
6. "My Lonely Sad Eyes" (Morrison) – 2:31

==== Side two ====
1. "Out of Sight" (James Brown, Ted Wright) – 2:24
2. "It's All Over Now, Baby Blue" (Bob Dylan) – 3:50
3. "Bad or Good" (Morrison) – 2:09
4. "How Long Baby" (M. Gillon a.k.a. Tommy Scott) – 3:40
5. "Don't You Know" (Tommy Scott) – 2:26
6. "Bring 'em On In" (Morrison) – 3:45

== Personnel ==
Although in his album review Bruce Eder is uncertain about the recording personnel other than Van Morrison and Alan Henderson, a review by Mojo magazine writers identifies them as:

- Van Morrison – vocals, harmonica
- Jim Armstrong – guitar
- Eric Wrixon, Jackie McAuley, Peter Bardens – keyboards
- Alan Henderson – bass
- John Wilson. drums

== Sources ==
- Dewitt, H. A. (1983). Van Morrison: The Mystic's Music. Horizon. ISBN 0-938840-02-9.
- Heylin, Clinton (2003). Can You Feel the Silence? Van Morrison: A New Biography. Chicago Review Press. ISBN 1-55652-542-7.
- The Mojo Collection (4th ed.). Great Britain: Canongate Books. 2007. ISBN 978-1847676436.
