= Gloria (Them song) =

1964 song by Them

- Belgian picture sleeve

Single by Them
- A-side: "Baby, Please Don't Go"
- Released: 6 November 1964
- Recorded: October 1964
- Studio: Decca Three, West Hampstead, UK
- Genre: British R&B; garage rock; proto-punk
- Length: 2:38
- Label: Decca
- Songwriter: Van Morrison
- Producer: Dick Rowe

Them singles chronology
"Baby, Please Don't Go" (1964)	"Gloria" (1964)	"Here Comes the Night" (1965)

Audio sample
- file; help

"Gloria" is a rock song written by Northern Irish singer-songwriter Van Morrison. Conceived in 1963, it was recorded with his band Them in 1964, and released as the B-side of "Baby, Please Don't Go" that same year. It received positive reviews and was moderately successful on release; it experienced commercial success in 1966, reaching number 71 on the Billboard Hot 100.

"Gloria" surged in popularity following a 1966 cover by the Shadows of Knight, which peaked at number 10 on the Billboard Hot 100. In 1975, Patti Smith reimagined the song for her debut album Horses, incorporating verses from her own poems and work, which has earned continued acclaim.

The original version of "Gloria", along with Shadows of Knight and Smith's covers, have often been ranked by critics among the best songs of all time. It has become a garage rock staple and a part of many rock bands' repertoires and is covered by artists including the Doors and Car Seat Headrest.

== Them original version ==
=== Background and recording ===
According to Morrison, he wrote "Gloria" while performing with the Monarchs in Germany in the summer of 1963, at just about the time he turned 18 years old. He started to perform it at the Maritime Hotel when he returned to Belfast and joined up with the Gamblers to form the band Them. He would ad-lib lyrics as he performed, sometimes stretching the song to 15 or 20 minutes. After signing a contract with Dick Rowe and Decca, Them went to London for a recording session at Decca Three Studios in West Hampstead on 5 April 1964; "Gloria" was one of the seven songs recorded that day.

Besides Morrison, present were Billy Harrison on guitar, Alan Henderson on bass guitar, Ronnie Millings on drums and Pat McCauley on keyboards. Rowe brought in session musicians Arthur Greenslade on organ and Bobby Graham on drums, since he considered the Them members too inexperienced. There remains some dispute about whether Millings and McCauley were actually miked, but Alan Henderson contends that Them constituted the first rock group to use two drummers on a recording. Although some sources claim that Jimmy Page played second guitar, other sources deny this.

=== Release ===
Decca Records released "Gloria" as the B-side of "Baby, Please Don't Go" in the UK on 6 November 1964, with only the latter reaching the singles chart. In the US the same pairing, released by Parrot Records, became a regional hit on the US West Coast. Between March and June 1965, the single (both songs) appeared on weekly Top 40 playlists for Los Angeles radio station KRLA, reaching number one for three weeks in April. Them's original entered the US Billboard Hot 100 chart in 1966, peaking at number 71.

"Gloria" was added to Them's first UK album The Angry Young Them (1965), which was re-titled with some different tracks as Them in the US. The song also appears on several compilations, including The Story of Them Featuring Van Morrison (1997) and The Best of Van Morrison (1990).

=== Legacy ===
One explanation for the timeless popularity of the song was offered in AllMusic's review by Bill Janovitz:

The beauty of the original is that Van Morrison needs only to speak-sing, in his Howlin' Wolf growl, "I watch her come up to my house/She knocks upon my door/And then she comes up to my room/I want to say she makes me feel all right/G-L-O-R-I-A!" to convey his teenage lust. The original Latin meaning of the name is not lost on Morrison. Them never varies from the three chords, using only dynamic changes to heighten the tension.

"Gloria" was rated number 69 on Dave Marsh's list in the 1989 book The Heart of Rock & Soul: The 1001 Greatest Singles Ever Made. He described the song as "one of the few rock songs that's actually as raunchy as its reputation."

In his book Rock and Roll: The 100 Best Singles, Paul Williams said about the two sides of the "Baby Please Don't Go/Gloria" recording: "Into the heart of the beast ... here is something so good, so pure, that if no other hint of it but this record existed, there would still be such a thing as rock and roll ... Van Morrison's voice a fierce beacon in the darkness, the lighthouse at the end of the world. Resulting in one of the most perfect rock anthems known to humankind."

In 1999, "Gloria" by Them received the Grammy Hall of Fame Award. In 2000, "Gloria" by Them was listed as number 81 on VH1's list of The 100 Greatest Rock Songs of All Time. In 2004, "Gloria" by Them was ranked No. 208 on Rolling Stone's list of the 500 Greatest Songs of All Time, moving down to No. 211 in the 2010 updated list, and 413 in the 2021 list.

=== Certifications ===
Certifications for "Gloria"
Region	Certification	Certified units/sales
New Zealand (RMNZ)	Gold	15,000^{‡}
^{‡} Sales+streaming figures based on certification alone.

== The Shadows of Knight version ==
=== Background ===
1965 – The Shadows of Knight recorded "Gloria", which was released as a single in December 1965 and later included on the album of the same name. Bill Janovitz describes it as "a faithful, though tamer version of the original". The Shadows of Knight replaced Morrison's line "She comes to my room" with "She calls out my name".

=== Reception and legacy ===
The song reached number 10 on the Billboard Hot 100 and number 8 on Canada's RPM charts in 1966, due to its popularity with radio stations that chose not to play Them's original because of its lyrics. Cash Box described it as "a bluesy, up tempo stomp'er devoted to 'Gloria'". Author/columnist Dave Barry wrote, "You can throw a guitar off a cliff, and as it bounces off the rocks on the way down, it will, all by itself, play Gloria."

Shadows of Knight's version of "Gloria" was included in The Rock and Roll Hall of Fame's 500 Songs that Shaped Rock and Roll.

== Patti Smith version ==
=== Background ===
Patti Smith recorded "Gloria" for her album Horses. Based on the Van Morrison tune, the lyrics had been adapted from an early poem, 'Oath'. Smith's band had started to play the song live and merged it with the poem by 1974, so the song contained half of Smith's own words. For the recording of her debut album, Smith and her band recorded the song live and, after mixing, chose it as the album's opener. The intro begins, "Jesus died for somebody's sins, but not mine".

=== Reception and legacy ===
According to Janovitz, "Smith's intermingling of lascivious sex and religious guilt (or lack thereof) certainly foreshadows similar sacred/profane juxtapositions from ultra-feminine Madonna and androgynous Prince." Rolling Stone said similarly that the "legend-making first line of Smith's galvanic act of rock & roll vandalism" showed the band to be "reveling in its cathartic simplicity" and "creating something reverent and revolutionary."

Rolling Stone ranked her version at number 97 in its 2024 list of the "500 Greatest Songs of All Time". Her version of "Gloria" was also included in The Rock and Roll Hall of Fame's 500 Songs that Shaped Rock and Roll.

== Other versions ==
- On June 6, 1966, the Canadian band King-Beezz reached number 75 on the RPM charts with their version.
- Between 1966 and 1970, The Doors performed the song several times, with one recording released on Alive, She Cried (1983). It was also released as a single, which reached number 18 on Hot Mainstream Rock Tracks and number 71 on Billboard Hot 100 in 1983. The song is included on Legacy: The Absolute Best (2003) and The Very Best of The Doors (2007).
- 1993 – Van Morrison recorded a version with John Lee Hooker, which reached the Top 40 in several countries: Irish Singles Chart No. 17, UK Singles Chart No. 31, US Hot Mainstream Rock Tracks No. 36, AUS No. 22 and the Netherlands No. 37.
- 1997 – Tom Petty on his Live at the Fillmore 1997 (released 2022).
- 2017 – Car Seat Headrest frequently interpolated Patti Smith's cover into the song "Connect The Dots (The Story of Frank Sinatra)".

== Sources ==
- Williams, Paul; Berryhill, Cindy Lee (December 1993). "Baby Please Don't Go / Gloria – Them (1964)". Rock and Roll: The 100 Best Singles (Hardcover ed.). United States: Entwhistle Books. pp. 71–72. ISBN 978-0-934558-41-9.
- Rogan, Johnny (June 2005). Van Morrison: No Surrender (Hardcover ed.). United Kingdom: Secker and Warburg. ISBN 978-0-436-20566-8.
- Heylin, Clinton (2003). Can You Feel the Silence? Van Morrison: A New Biography, Chicago Review Press ISBN 1-55652-542-7
- Turner, Steve (1993). Van Morrison: Too Late to Stop Now, Viking Penguin, ISBN 0-670-85147-7
