= Them (band) =

Northern Irish rock band (1964–1972)

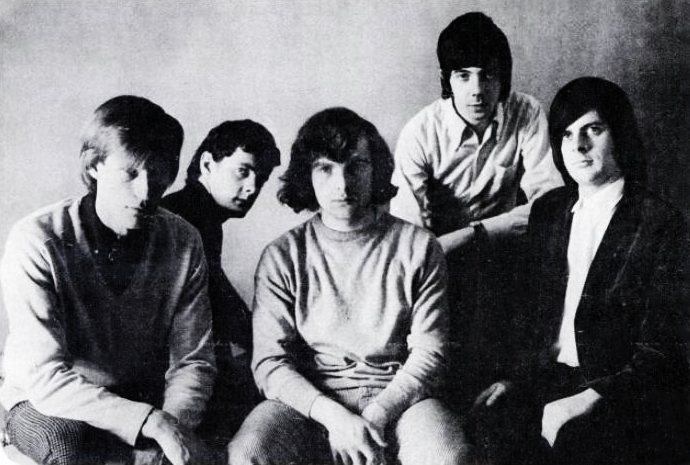
- Them in 1965. From left to right: Billy Harrison, Alan Henderson, Van Morrison, Peter Bardens, Pat McAuley.

Background information
- Also known as: Belfast Gypsies (1966–1967); The Belfast Blues Band (1990–2015)
- Origin: Belfast, Northern Ireland
- Genres: Blues rock; garage rock; proto-punk; rhythm and blues; freakbeat
- Years active: 1964–1972; (one-off reunion: 1979)
- Labels: Decca; Parrot; Major Minor; Happy Tiger; Teldec; Tower; Deram
- Past members: Van Morrison; Eric Wrixon; Alan Henderson; Billy Harrison; Ronnie Milling; Pat McAuley; Jackie McAuley; Peter Bardens; Joe Baldi; Terry Noon; Jim Armstrong; John Wilson; Dave Harvey; Steve Reush; Sammy Stitt; Eric Bell; Mike Brown; Joe Hanratty; Kenny McDowell; Ray Elliot; Jerry Cole; Jim Parker; John Stark; Mel Austin; Billy Bell; Brian Scott

Them were a Northern Irish rock band formed in Belfast, in April 1964, most prominent for their 1964 garage rock standard "Gloria" and launching Van Morrison's musical career. The original five-member band consisted of Morrison, Alan Henderson, Ronnie Milling, Billy Harrison, and Eric Wrixon.

Them scored two UK hits in 1965 with "Baby, Please Don't Go" (UK No. 10) and "Here Comes the Night" (UK No. 2; Ireland No. 2). The latter song and "Mystic Eyes" were top 40 hits in the US.

Morrison quit the band in 1966 and went on to a successful career as a solo artist. The group had considerable influence on other bands, such as the Doors.

The band's recording of "Gloria" was inducted into the Grammy Hall of Fame in 1999. It was ranked No. 69 in Dave Marsh's 1989 book, The Heart of Rock and Soul, The 1001 Greatest Singles Ever and "Mystic Eyes" was ranked No. 458. "Gloria" was listed at No. 208 in the 2004 Rolling Stone magazine's feature The 500 Greatest Songs of All Time.

== Origins ==
=== Formation ===
In April 1964, Van Morrison responded to an advert for musicians to play at a new R&B club at the Maritime Hotel–an old dance hall frequented by sailors. The new club needed a band for its opening night; however Morrison had left the Golden Eagles (the group with which he had been performing at the time), so he created a new band out of the Gamblers, an East Belfast group formed by Ronnie Milling, Billy Harrison, and Alan Henderson in 1962. Eric Wrixon, still a schoolboy, was the piano player and keyboardist. Morrison played saxophone and harmonica and shared vocals with Billy Harrison. They followed Eric Wrixon's suggestion for a new name, and the Gamblers morphed into Them, their name taken from the 50s horror movie Them!

The band's strong performances at the Maritime attracted attention. Them performed without a routine and Morrison ad libbed, creating his songs live as he performed. While the band did covers, they also played some of Morrison's early songs, such as "Could You Would You", which he had written in Camden Town while touring with the Manhattan Showband. The debut of Morrison's "Gloria" happened on stage here. Sometimes, depending on his mood, the song could last up to twenty minutes. Morrison has said, "Them lived and died on the stage at the Maritime Hotel," believing the band did not manage to capture the spontaneity and energy of their live performances on their records. The statement also reflected the instability of the Them line-up, with numerous members passing through the ranks after the definitive Maritime period. Morrison and Henderson remained the only constants, and a less successful version of Them soldiered on after Morrison's departure.

Dick Rowe of Decca Records became aware of the band's performances, and signed Them to a standard two-year contract. In that period, they released two albums and ten singles, with two more singles released after Morrison departed the band. They had three chart hits, "Baby, Please Don't Go" (1964), "Here Comes the Night" (1965), and "Mystic Eyes" (1965), but it was the B-side of "Baby, Please Don't Go", the garage band classic "Gloria", which went on to become a rock standard covered by Patti Smith, the Doors, the Shadows of Knight, Jimi Hendrix, and many others.

=== Maritime Hotel ===
On 14 April 1964, an advertisement in a Belfast newspaper asked: "Who Are? What Are? THEM". Similarly curious advertisements followed until the Friday before the gig (17 April 1964) announced that Them would be performing that evening at Club Rado at the Maritime Hotel. Attendance at the two hundred capacity venue quickly grew with a packed house by the third week.

Them performed without a routine, fired by the crowd's energy. Morrison later commented that while the band was "out of our element" making records. "The way we did the numbers at the Maritime was more spontaneous, more energetic, more everything, because we were feeding off the crowd." Morrison ad libbed songs as he performed and "Gloria", the song he had written at eighteen years old, took shape here and could last up to twenty minutes. According to Morrison, "Them lived and died on the stage at the Maritime Hotel" but only very rudimentary recordings survive. One fan's recording of "Turn On Your Love Light" made its way to Mervyn and Phil Solomon, who contacted Decca Records' Dick Rowe, who then travelled to Belfast to hear Them perform. Rowe and Phil Solomon agreed on a two-year contract with the members of the band then signed with Solomon. Morrison being only eighteen, had to have his father sign for him. Within a few weeks, the group was taken to England and into Decca's recording studio in West Hampstead for their first recording session.

== Peak years ==
=== With Decca ===
"Gloria"
Morrison's garage rock classic was inducted into the Grammy Hall of Fame in 1999. As described by Paul Williams: "Van Morrison's voice a fierce beacon in the darkness, the lighthouse at the end of the world. Resulting in one of the most perfect rock anthems known to humankind."

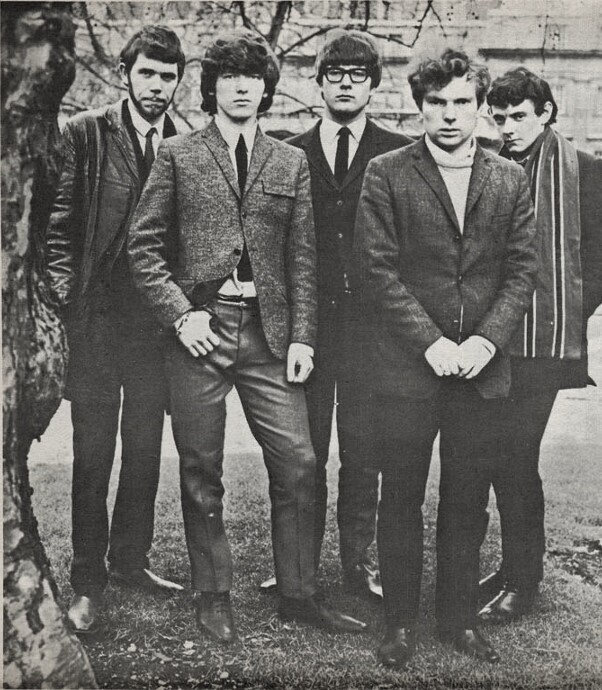
Them, featured in the 30 April 1966 issue of KRLA Beat. From left: Ray Elliott, John Wilson, Jim Armstrong, Van Morrison, Alan Henderson

Them's first recording session took place in London on 5 July 1964. "Turn on Your Love Light" and "Gloria" were recorded during this session as were both sides of their first single, "Don't Start Crying Now" and "One Two Brown Eyes" as well as "Groovin'", "Philosophy" and Bo Diddley's "You Can't Judge a Book by Its Cover". The session was remarkable in its employment of two drums tracks, which can be clearly heard in the stereo mixes of "Gloria" and "One Two Brown Eyes". Rowe used session musicians Arthur Greenslade on organ and Bobby Graham on second drum kit. At this late stage it became clear that the parents of Eric Wrixon, a minor in law, would not sign the contract on his behalf so he was replaced by Pat John McAuley. The single, released in August, did not prove to be successful.

Their next single, Big Joe Williams's "Baby, Please Don't Go" substituted Andy White on drums, Phil Coulter on second keyboard, and added Jimmy Page on rhythm guitar. The lead guitar track was the work of Billy Harrison. It was released in November with "Gloria" as its B-side. In December 1964, Them made their television debut, joining The Rolling Stones, on Ready Steady Go! Their manager, Phil Solomon got the track used as the show's signature tune and within two weeks it was at No. 19 on the UK Singles Chart, eventually peaking at No. 10.

In January 1965, Them toured England for a second time, staying at the Royal Hotel, which disc jockey Jimmy Savile used as his London base. Savile helped promote the band in his column for The People but Them earned a reputation for bad manners and sarcasm in their interviews. Billy Harrison said the attitude problem may have been caused by anti-Irish sentiments on the continent at the time. But, when they were interviewed by a reporter from the Irish Independent, the reporter remarked, "They were the most boorish bunch of youngsters I'd come across in my short career." Phil Coulter recalled the band's interview with a female reporter: "They would just sit and mutter monosyllabic grunts to themselves and give her off-the-wall answers". (Morrison as a solo artist raised such interviews to a "negative art form"). Their management promoted Them by scheduling appearances on Ready Steady Go! and on Top of the Pops where, rather than performing live, they were expected to mime and lip sync. Morrison said of this appearance, "It was ridiculous. We were totally anti that type of thing... and we had to get into suits and have make-up put on and all that". He also revealed how the band had, until that time, considered the programme a complete joke.

Their next release was Them's biggest hit in the UK, "Here Comes the Night". The producer was also the writer of the song, Bert Berns, an American, who had also co-written "Twist and Shout". Backed with "All for Myself" it charted in the UK at No. 2 on 22 April 1965, five weeks after entering the charts, and went to No. 24 in the U.S. in May. Both tracks originate from the same session in October 1964 that yielded "Baby Please Don't Go" but were temporarily shelved by Decca in favour of Lulu's version of "Here Comes the Night" which reached only No. 50 on the British charts.

On 11 April 1965, Them made a guest appearance at the NME Pollwinners Concert at Wembley Empire Pool: Jimmy Savile was MC for this event, which also included The Beatles, The Rolling Stones, The Kinks, The Animals, The Searchers, The Moody Blues and Dusty Springfield. The bands had been expected to keep to their current hits, but Them audaciously segued from "Here Comes the Night" into a seven-minute version of "Turn on Your Love Light". After the performances, NME's Derek Johnson commented that Morrison had "more genuine soul than any of his British contemporaries".

The band released their first album, The Angry Young Them, in June 1965 (UK) and it appeared in the US on Parrot Records in July. But Them's next single, "One More Time", chosen by Phil Solomon, failed–according to Billy Harrison because it never constituted single material. In July 1965, the band added English drummer Terry Noon and Scottish lead guitarist Joe Baldi but they left in September. Their second album, Them Again, was released in January 1966 in the UK and in April 1966 in the US.

=== Success in North America and departure of Morrison ===
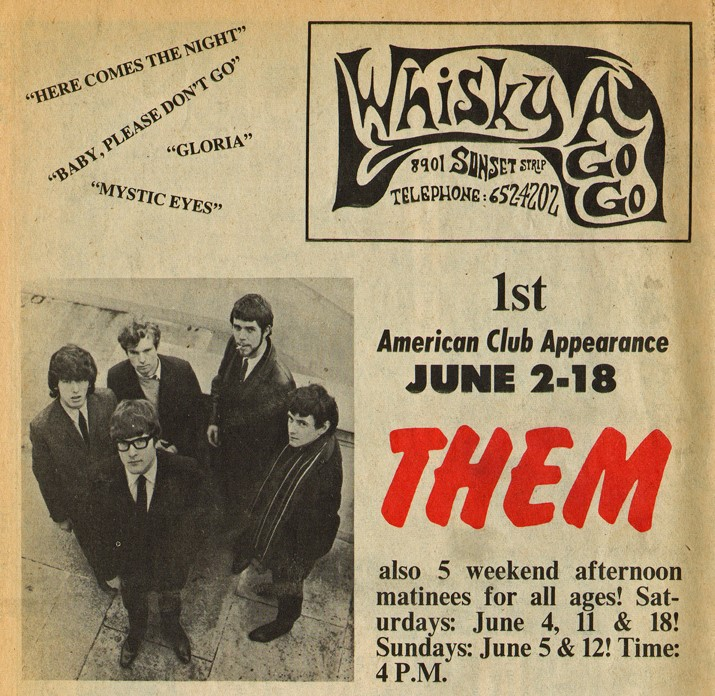
June 1966 promotional ad for performances at the Whisky a Go Go

The group was marketed in the United States as part of the British Invasion. After the success of "Here Comes the Night", the band scored a chart hit again later in 1965 with "Mystic Eyes", which reached No.33. Them Again, released in April 1966 in the US, also charted and the band began a US tour in May 1966. From 30 May to 18 June, Them had a residency at the Whisky a Go Go in Los Angeles. For the final week The Doors opened for Them and on the last night the two bands jammed a twenty-minute version of "Gloria" and a twenty-five-minute version of "In the Midnight Hour". Next Them headlined at The Fillmore in San Francisco and then to Hawaii, where disputes erupted among band members and management over money. The band broke apart, Morrison and Henderson returning to Belfast while Ray Elliott and David Harvey decided to stay in America.

Van Morrison has placed the break-up of Them in context: "There was no motive behind anything you did [back then]. You just did it because you wanted to do it and you enjoyed doing it. That's the way the thing started, but it got twisted somewhere along the way and everybody involved in it got twisted as well, including me. You can't take something like that, put it in a box and place a neat little name on it, then try to sell it. That's what they tried to do. That's what killed Them."

Van Morrison went on to great success and fame as a solo artist, but Them's combination of garage rock and blues proved a major influence on the next generations of rock musicians, and the group's best-known singles have become staples of rock and roll.

Influential Proto Punk Detroit outfit MC5 released a cover of Them's "I Can Only Give You Everything", backed with their own "One of the Guys", on the AMG label in 1967.

== Post-Morrison ==
=== Belfast Gypsies ===
In late August 1965, Billy Harrison and Pat McAuley formed a rival Them, competing with the Morrison/Henderson line-up and leading to legal action. In March 1966, the latter won the rights to the name while the former, now without Harrison but with Pat's brother Jackie McAuley (born John James McAuley, 14 December 1946, in Coleraine, County Londonderry, Northern Ireland; ex-Them, ex-Kult), were only allowed to call themselves 'Other Them' in the UK. The McAuley brothers unofficially became Them Belfast Gypsies (or Gipsies), though they were never actually billed as such, and recorded two singles on Island Records (one released under the name Freaks of Nature) and one Swedish-only album, all produced by Kim Fowley. They toured Europe billed as Them and released a French EP under that name but broke up in November 1966. Not long after that the Morrison line-up also split. In March 1967 Morrison did a short tour of the Netherlands backed by Cuby & the Blizzards, actually only the Blizzards without lead singer Cuby, and then left for New York to start his solo career. The rest regrouped in Belfast, recruited Kenny McDowell (born Kenneth McDowell, 21 December 1944, in Belfast, County Antrim, Northern Ireland) (ex–Mad Lads) as lead singer and continued touring and recording steadily after relocating to the US in early 1967 at the invitation of producer Ray Ruff.

=== 1968 until dissolution ===
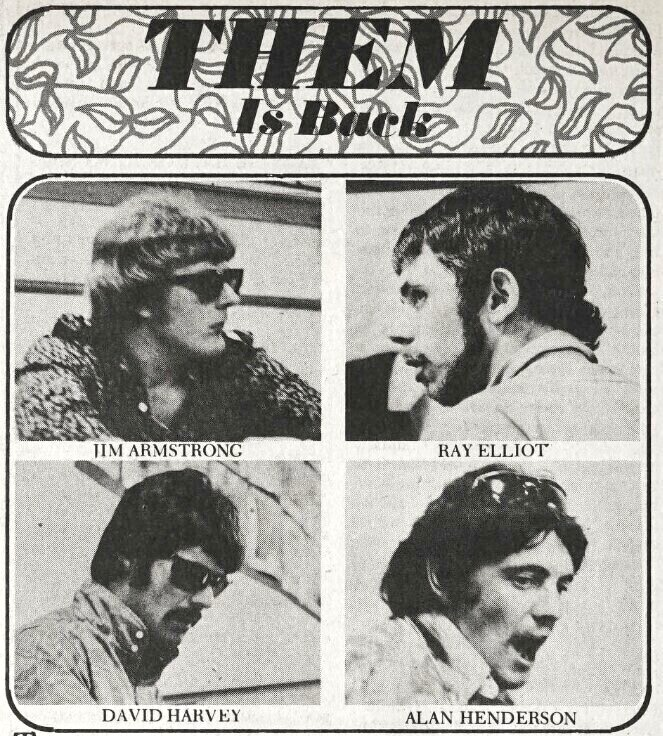
Hit Parader announcing that "Them Is Back" in its March 1968 issue

Two albums, Now and "Them" and Time Out! Time In for Them, found the band experimenting with psychedelia. Then Jim Armstrong and Kenny McDowell returned to Belfast to perform as Sk'boo (Armstrong, McDowell and Ray Elliot reunited in Chicago in 1969 as Truth and recorded a number of demos and soundtrack songs later released as Of Them and Other Tales).

Henderson hired session musicians for two more records for Ray Ruff's Happy Tiger Records, in a hard rock vein with country and folk elements; Them (1969) features Jerry Cole as guitarist while Them in Reality (1970) features lead guitarist Jim Parker and drummer John Stark (both ex–Kitchen Cinq). Henderson also co-wrote a rock opera, Truth of Truths, produced by Ray Ruff in 1971. These efforts were met with consumer indifference and in 1972 Them dissolved. Alan Henderson, Billy Harrison and Eric Wrixon reunited in 1979, without Morrison, recording another album, Shut Your Mouth, and undertaking a tour of Germany using Billy Bell on drums, and Mel Austin as vocalist. Since the 1990s, Wrixon had toured under the moniker of Them the Belfast Blues Band, at one point including ex-Them guitarists Jim Armstrong and Billy Harrison.

Alan Henderson died on 9 April 2017 in Big Lake, Minnesota, at the age of 72.

== Personnel ==
- Van Morrison – lead vocals, saxophone, harmonica (1964–1966)
- Alan Henderson – bass (1964–1966, 1966–1971, 1979; died 2017)
- Billy Harrison – guitar, vocals (1964–1966)
- Ronnie Milling – drums (1964; died 2024)
- Eric Wrixon – keyboards (1964, 1965, 1979; died 2015)
- Pat McAuley – keyboards (1964), drums (1964–1965; died 1984)
- Jackie McAuley – keyboards (1965)
- Peter Bardens – keyboards (1965; died 2002)
- Joe Baldi – guitar (1965)
- Terry Noon – drums (1965)
- Jim Armstrong – guitar (1965–1966, 1966–1969, 1979)
- John Wilson – drums (1965–1966)
- Ray Elliott – keyboards, saxophone, flute (1965–1967)
- Dave Harvey – drums (1965–1966)
- Steve Reush – drums (1966)
- Sammy Stitt – drums (1966)
- Eric Bell – guitar (1966)
- Mike Brown – bass (1966)
- Joe Hanratty – drums (1966)
- Kenny McDowell – lead vocals (1966–1969)
- Ray Harvey – drums (1966–1969)
- Jerry Cole – vocals, guitar, percussion (1969–1970; died 2008)
- Jim Parker – guitar, vocals (1970–1971)
- John Stark – drums, vocals (1970–1971)
- Mel Austin – lead vocals (1979; died 2017)
- Billy Bell – drums (1979)
- Brian Scott – keyboards, flute (1979)

Other Them / Belfast Gypsies

- Pat McAuley – organ (1965–1966), drums (1966)
- Mark Scott (a.k.a. Peter Cutchey) – bass (1965–1966)
- Nick Wymer – lead vocals (1965–1966)
- Skip Alan – drums (1965)
- Billy Harrison – guitar (1965)
- 'Don' – guitar (1965–1966)
- Viv Prince – drums (1965)
- Ken McLeod – drums (1965–1966), guitar (1966)
- Jackie McAuley – lead vocals, organ, harmonica (1966)
- Peter Bardens – keyboards (1966)

Truth

- Jim Armstrong – guitar (1969–1971)
- Curtis Bachman – bass (1969–1971)
- Kenny McDowell – lead vocals (1969–1971)
- Reno Smith – drums (1969–1971)
- Ray Elliott – keyboards, flute (1970)
- Buddy Clark – drums (1971)

Them – The Belfast Blues Band

- Eric Wrixon – keyboards, lead vocals (1993–2015)
- Jim Armstrong – guitar (1993–2003)
- John Wilson – drums (1993–?)
- Billy Bell – drums
- Ally MacKenzie – bass
- Siggi Heilek – drums
- Billy McCoy – guitar (?–2015)
- Luca Nardi – bass (?–2015)
- Tom Wagener – drums (?–2015)

== Discography ==
=== Studio albums ===
Title	Album details	Peak chart positions	
Title	Album details	UK	US
The Angry Young Them (released under the title Them in the US)	Released: 11 June 1965 (UK); Label: Decca	—	—
Them Again	Released: 21 January 1966 (UK); Label: Decca	—	138
Belfast Gypsies	Released: 1967 (SWE); Label: Sonet	—	—
Now and "Them"	Released: 1968 (US); Label: Tower	—	—
Time Out! Time in for Them	Released: 1968 (US); Label: Tower	—	—
Them	Released: 1969 (US); Label: Happy Tiger	—	—
Them in Reality	Released: 1970 (US); Label: Happy Tiger	—	—
Shut Your Mouth	Released: 1979 (GER); Label: Strand	—	—

=== Extended plays ===
Title	Album details
Them	Released: 19 February 1965 (UK); Label: Decca

=== Select compilation albums ===
Title	Album details
The World of Them	Released: 1970 (UK); Label: Decca
Them Featuring Van Morrison	Released: 1972 (US); Label: Parrot
Backtrackin'	Released: 1974 (US); Label: London
Rock Roots	Released: 1976 (UK); Label: Decca
The Story of Them	Released: 1977 (US); Label: London
The Story of Them Featuring Van Morrison	Released: 1997 (UK); Label: Deram
The Complete Them 1964–1967	Released: 2015 (US); Label: Legacy

=== Singles ===
Title (A-side and B-side from same album except where noted)	Year	Peak chart positions							Album
Title (A-side and B-side from same album except where noted)	Year	UK	AUS	BEL (Wal.)	CAN	GER	IRE	US	Album
"Don't Start Crying Now" B-side: "One Two Brown Eyes"	1964	–	–	–	–	–	–	–	Them (EP)
"Baby, Please Don't Go" B-side: "Gloria" (from The Angry Young Them)	1964	10	45; 22	36	–	–	–	102	Them (EP)
"Here Comes the Night" B-side: "All For Myself" (non-album track)	1965	2	17	–	8	–	2	24	Them (US album)
"One More Time" B-side: "How Long Baby" (from Them Again)	1965	–	–	–	–	–	–	–	Non-album singles
"(It Won't Hurt) Half As Much" B-side: "I'm Gonna Dress In Black" (from The Angry Young Them)	1965	–	–	–	–	–	–	–	Non-album singles
"Mystic Eyes" B-side: "If You And I Could Be As Two"	1965	–	43	–	24	–	–	33	The Angry Young Them
"Call My Name" B-side: "Bring 'Em On In"	1966	–	56	–	–	–	–	–	Them Again
"Richard Cory" B-side: "Don't You Know" (from Them Again)	1966	–	–	–	–	–	–	–	Non-album single
"I Can Only Give You Everything" B-side: "Don't Start Crying Now"	1966	–	–	–	–	–	–	–	Non-album single
"It's All Over Now, Baby Blue" B-side: "Bad or Good"	1973	–	–	–	–	13	–	–	Them Again
