= Dick Rowe =

English record company executive (1921–1986)

- Born: Richard Paul Brutton Rowe; 9 June 1921; London, England
- Died: 6 June 1986 (aged 64); London, England
- Occupations: Record producer; music executive
- Known for: Head of A&R singles at Decca Records

Richard Paul Brutton Rowe (9 June 1921 – 6 June 1986) was a British music executive and record producer. He was head of A&R (Singles) at Decca Records from the 1950s to the 1970s, and produced many top-selling records during that period. Known as "the man with the golden ear", Rowe discovered and signed the Rolling Stones, Van Morrison, Tom Jones, Cat Stevens, the Moody Blues, Procol Harum, the Animals, and Engelbert Humperdinck amongst others. Known as being artist friendly and a true music lover he always wanted the best for talent sometimes putting him at odds with upper management.

He is historically presented in popular music history as the man who did not sign the Beatles. In Brian Epstein's 1964 autobiography, Rowe is quoted as having rejected them with the words: "Guitar groups are on their way out, Mr. Epstein", although he denied ever having said this. He later signed the Rolling Stones after their audition, thanks to an introduction and encouragement from George Harrison.

== Life and career ==
Rowe was born in London. He joined the A&R department at Decca in 1948, where his responsibilities were to both discover and produce records by new talents. In 1953, he produced "Broken Wings" by vocal group the Stargazers, the first locally-produced and non-American record to reach number one on the newly-published British singles chart. He persuaded jazz singer Lita Roza to record the novelty song "(How Much Is) That Doggie in the Window", another number one hit in the UK, and had further success in the early and mid-1950s with recording artists including David Whitfield, Winifred Atwell, Jimmy Young, and the Beverley Sisters.

In 1959, he left Decca to join Top Rank Records. There, he discovered singer Craig Douglas, promoted Bert Weedon – the first British performer to use the electric guitar as a lead instrument – and authorised the successful release in Britain of many American singles including those by Chubby Checker, the Ventures, and Freddy Cannon. He also supported the release of John Leyton's controversial "death disc" "Johnny Remember Me", produced by Joe Meek.

Rowe returned to Decca in 1961, and promoted the career of Billy Fury, co-producing many of the singer's hits including "Halfway to Paradise". He also found success with the instrumental duo of Jet Harris and Tony Meehan. After they had been seen in Liverpool by A&R man Mike Smith the previous month, Rowe auditioned the Beatles in London in January 1962, on the same day as auditioning Brian Poole and the Tremeloes. Rowe and Smith agreed to accept the latter group and reject the Beatles, partly because the Tremeloes were based closer to London and would be easier to work with. However, the Beatles went on to land a recording contract with EMI/Parlophone and become the biggest selling and most influential band of all time.

Rowe subsequently signed several Liverpool bands and musicians to Decca, including Beryl Marsden and the Big Three. On George Harrison's recommendation, he also signed the Rolling Stones. In the 1960s, he remained one of the most important producers and record executives in the United Kingdom, and signed Them (featuring Van Morrison), the Moody Blues, the Zombies, John Mayall's Bluesbreakers, Tom Jones, the Small Faces, the Marmalade, the Animals, Cat Stevens, Procol Harum, Kathy Kirby, and Gilbert O'Sullivan amongst others.

Rowe retired in 1975, and died as a result of diabetes in 1986 at the age of 64.

== List of productions ==
As a producer he had several number ones in the singles chart, and his discography includes:

- The Stargazers: "Broken Wings" released February 1953 ≠
- Lita Roza: "(How Much Is) That Doggie in the Window?" March 1953 ≠
- Jimmy Young: "Unchained Melody" April 1955 ≠
- Jimmy Young: "The Man from Laramie" September 1955 ≠
- Dickie Valentine: "Christmas Alphabet" November 1955 ≠
- Billy Fury: "Halfway to Paradise" (reached number 2 in 1961 in the UK)
- Billy Fury: "Jealousy" (reached number 2 in 1961)
- Jet Harris and Tony Meehan: "Diamonds" 1963 ≠
- Jet Harris and Tony Meehan: "Scarlett O'Hara" (reached number 2 in 1963)
- Jet Harris and Tony Meehan: "Applejack" (reached number 4 in 1963)
- Engelbert Humperdinck: some tracks on His Greatest Love Songs
- Them: "Gloria"
- The Bachelors: "Marta" July 1967 (reached number 20)
- Neil Reid: "Mother of Mine" December 1971 (reached number 2)
- ≠ – UK number one hits

== Legacy ==
Rowe's son, Richard Rowe, is a solicitor who went into the music business as a lawyer for CBS Records before becoming head of their business affairs. He was president of SonyATV Music Publishing (and made the deal to create a joint partnership with Michael Jackson to publish the Beatles catalogue at Sony/ATV when he ran the worldwide publishing division of Sony Music). Rowe spent the evening explaining to Jackson why this deal would transform the world of music publishing and give the artists power over their legacy. Jackson was interested, but asked for one more reason to sign. Rowe then admitted his father was known as the man who turned the Beatles down. Jackson agreed this was cruelly unfair and decided to sign the deal.
