= John Lee Hooker discography =

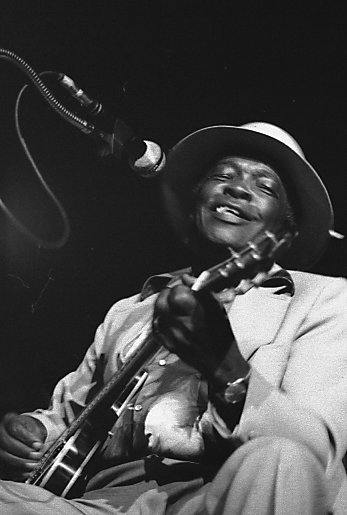
- John Lee Hooker performing with his guitar on stage while smiling, taken in 1978.
- Studio albums: 27
- Soundtrack albums: 1
- Live albums: 10
- Compilation albums: 26+

John Lee Hooker was an American blues singer and guitarist who recorded from 1948 to 2001. His discography includes recordings issued by various record companies in different formats.

Hooker's music blended elements of Delta blues, talking blues and early North Mississippi hill country blues. His early recordings, like "Boogie Chillen'" (1948) and "Crawling King Snake" (1949), featured Hooker alone on electric guitar.

In February 2022, it was announced that BMG had acquired Hooker's music interests from his estate. The agreement included his entire publishing catalog in addition to his recorded and performance royalty income, as well as a selection of Hooker's recorded catalog spanning Alone, Vol. 1 (1980) through to Black Night Is Falling (2019).

== Studio albums ==
List of albums with year released, title, label, year(s) recorded, and reference(s)
Year; released	Title	Label; (Cat. no.)	Year(s); recorded	Ref(s)
1960	The Country Blues of John Lee Hooker (Note: Riverside initially issued the album as The Folk Blues of John Lee Hooker on back cover and label.)	Riverside (12-838)	1959	
1960	Travelin'	Vee-Jay (1023)	1960	
1960	That's My Story	Riverside (12-321)	1960	
1961	The Folk Lore of John Lee Hooker	Vee-Jay (1033)	1960–1961	
1962	Burnin'	Vee-Jay (1043)	1961	
1963	The Big Soul of John Lee Hooker	Vee-Jay (1058)	1962	
1964	John Lee Hooker on Campus	Vee-Jay (1066)	1963	
1965	...And Seven Nights	Verve Folkways (3003)	1965	
1966	It Serve You Right to Suffer	Impulse! (A-9103)	1965	
1966	The Real Folk Blues	Chess (1508)	1966	
1967	Urban Blues	BluesWay (6012)	1967	
1969	Simply the Truth	BluesWay (6023)	1968	
1969	If You Miss 'Im...I Got 'Im	BluesWay (6038)	1969	
1969	Get Back Home	Black & Blue (333.023)	1969	
1971	I Feel Good!	Carson (3662)	1969	
1971	Hooker 'n Heat	Liberty (35002)	1970	
1971	Endless Boogie	ABC (720)	1970	
1972	Never Get Out of These Blues Alive	ABC (736)	1971	
1973	Born in Mississippi, Raised Up in Tennessee	ABC (768)	1971	
1974	Free Beer and Chicken	ABC (838)	1974	
1986	Jealous	Pausa (7197)	1982	
1989	The Healer	Chameleon (03323 74808 26)	1987–1989	
1991	Mr. Lucky	Pointblank (07567 91724 26)	1990–1991	
1992	Boom Boom	Pointblank (07777 86553 29)	1987–1992	
1995	Chill Out	Pointblank (72438 40107 20)	1986–1995	
1997	Don't Look Back	Pointblank (72438 42771 23)	1996	
2003	Face to Face	Eagle Records (ER 20023-2)	1991–2001	

== Live albums ==
List of albums with year released, title, label, year(s) recorded, and reference(s)
Year; released	Title	Label; (Cat. no.)	Year(s); recorded	Ref(s)
1963	Live at Sugar Hill	Galaxy (8205)	1962	
1964	Concert at Newport	Vee-Jay (1078)	1963	
1966	Live at Cafe Au Go Go	BluesWay (6002)	1966	
1972	Live at Soledad Prison	ABC (761)	1972	
1973	Kabuki Wuki	BluesWay (6052)	1971	
1978	The Cream	Tomato (2-7009)	1977	
1979	Live In 1978	Lunar #2 Recordings (L2S-200)	1978	
1980	Alone, Vol. 1	Labor Records (4)	1976	
1994	The Rising Sun Collection (Note: Later released as Black Night Is Falling on Justin Time Records, in 2019.)	Just A Memory (RSC 0001)	1977	
2020	Live At Montreux 1983 & 1990	Eagle Records (60250 895534 1)	1983, 1990	

== Selected compilations ==
List of albums with year released, title, label, year(s) recorded, and reference(s)
Year; released	Title	Label; (Cat. no.)	Year(s); recorded	Ref(s)
1959	House of the Blues	Chess (1438)	1951–1954	
1959	I'm John Lee Hooker	Vee-Jay (1007)	1955–1959	
1960	The Blues	Crown (5157)	1948–1952	
1960	John Lee Hooker Sings Blues	King (727)	1949–1950	
1961	John Lee Hooker Plays & Sings the Blues	Chess (1454)	1951–1952	
1961	Sings the Blues	Crown (5232)	1948–1954	
1962	Folk Blues	Crown (5295)	1951–1954	
1962	The Best of John Lee Hooker	Vee-Jay (1049)	1956–1961	
1963	Don't Turn Me from Your Door	Atco (33-151)	1953, 1961	
1964	Is He The World's Greatest Blues Singer?	Vee-Jay (8502)	1955–1963	
1964	The Great John Lee Hooker	Crown (5353)	1948–1954	
1964	Burning Hell	Riverside (008)	1959	
1964	Original Folk Blues	Kent (5025)	1948–1954	
1969	That's Where It's At!	Stax (2013)	1961	
1971	Goin' Down Highway 51	Specialty (2127)	1948–1951	
1980	Sittin' Here Thinkin'	Muse (5205)	1961	
1989	Boogie Chillen	Official (86 029)	1948–1954	
1990	The Hot Spot: Original Soundtrack	Antilles (422-846 813–2)	1990	
1991	More Real Folk Blues: The Missing Album	Chess/MCA (9329)	1966	
1991	The Ultimate Collection	Rhino (R2 70572)	1948–1990	
1992	The Vee Jay Years	Charly R&B (CD RED BOX 6)	1955–1964	
1993	Everybody's Blues	Specialty (7035-2)	1950–1954	
1994	The Legendary Modern Recordings	Ace (1438)	1948–1954	
1994	The Early Years	Tomato (9906/7-2)	1955–1964	
1995	Alternative Boogie: Early Studio Recordings	Capitol/EMI (72438 33912 26)	1948–1952	
1998	The Best Of Friends (Note: Includes three new recordings.)	Pointblank (72438 46424 26)	1987–1998	
2017	Whiskey & Wimmen: John Lee Hooker's Finest	Vee-Jay (VJR-00003; 088807 202058 0)	1954–1964	
2025	The Standard School Broadcast Recordings	BMG (4099 96411189 7)	1973	

== Albums in the charts ==
List of charting albums with year, title, label, and peak chart positions
Year; released	Title	Peak chart; positions								
Year; released	Title	US	US Blues	AUT	GER	NL	NZ	SWE	SWI	UK
1967	House of the Blues	—	NC	—	—	—	—	—	—	34
1971	Hooker 'n Heat	73	NC	—	–	—	—	—	—	—
1971	Endless Boogie	126	NC	—	—	—	—	—	—	—
1972	Never Get Out of These Blues Alive	130	NC	—	—	—	—	—	—	—
1989	The Healer	62	NC	—	17	9	6	38	15	3
1991	Mr. Lucky	101	NC	25	13	27	9	16	10	3
1992	Boom Boom	—	NC	—	35	84	37	41	20	15
1995	Chill Out	136	3	26	27	78	38	18	13	23
1997	Don't Look Back	163	3	48	31	—	18	35	39	63
1998	The Best of Friends	—	4	—	31	45	15	54	44	—
2002	Winning Combinations: John Lee Hooker & Muddy Waters	—	6	—	—	—	—	—	—	—
2003	Face to Face	—	3	—	—	—	—	—	—	—
2007	Hooker (box set)	—	14	—	—	—	—	—	—	—
2015	Two Sides of John Lee Hooker	—	12	—	—	—	—	—	—	—
2018	Early Recordings: Detroit and Beyond	—	5	—	—	—	—	—	—	—
2020	Live at Montreux: 1983 & 1990	—	9	—	—	—	—	—	—	—
"—" denotes a recording that did not chart or was not released in that territory.

== Early singles (1948–1955) ==
In the 1950s, Hooker often recorded variations of his songs for different studios for an up-front fee. To evade his recording contract with Modern Records, he used various pseudonyms, including John Lee Booker (for Chess Records and Chance Records in 1951–1952), Johnny Lee (for De Luxe Records in 1953–1954), John Lee, John Lee Cooker, Texas Slim, Delta John, Birmingham Sam and his Magic Guitar, Johnny Williams, and the Boogie Man.

Release year-month	Title	Label	Pseudonyms	Album
1948-11	"Sally May" b/w "Boogie Chillen'"	Modern	John Lee Hooker & His Guitar	A-side: The Great John Lee Hooker (1963); B-side: The Blues (1960)
1948-12	"Black Man Blues" b/w "Stomp Boogie"	King	Texas Slim	N/A
1949-xx	"Grievin' Blues" b/w "Wayne County Ramblin' Blues"	Danceland	Little Pork Chops	N/A
1949-xx	"Miss Rosie Mae" b/w "Highway Blues"	Staff	Johnny Williams and His Guitar	N/A
1949-02	"Helpless Blues" b/w "Goin' Mad Blues"	Regent	Delta John	N/A
1949-03	"Low Down-Midnite Boogie" b/w "Landing Blues"	Savoy	Birmingham Sam and His Magic Guitar	N/A
1949-03	"Hobo Blues" b/w "Hoogie Boogie"	Modern	John Lee Hooker & His Guitar	The Blues (1960)
1949-04	"Do the Boogie" b/w "Morning Blues"	Acorn	The Boogie Man	N/A
1949-07	"Whistlin' and Moanin' Blues" b/w "Weeping Willow Boogie"	Modern	John Lee Hooker	The Blues (1960)
1949-08	"Devil's Jump" b/w "The Numbers"	King	Texas Slim	Sings Blues (1960)
1949-10	"Crawlin' King Snake" b/w "Drifting from Door to Door"	Modern	John Lee Hooker and His Guitar	A-side: The Blues (1960); B-side: Sings The Blues (1961)
1949-10	"I'm Gonna Kill that Woman" b/w "Nightmare Blues"	King	Texas Slim	Sings Blues (1960)
1949-11	"Burnin' Hell" b/w "Miss Sadie Mae"	Sensation	John Lee Hooker and His Guitar	N/A
1949-12	"Canal Street Blues" b/w "Huckle Up Baby"	Sensation	John Lee Hooker and His Guitar	N/A
1950-01	"Playin' the Races" b/w "Howlin' Wolf"	Modern	John Lee Hooker and His Guitar	A-side: N/A; B-side: The Great John Lee Hooker (1963)
1950-01	"Heart Trouble Blues" b/w "Slim's Stomp"	King	Texas Slim	Sings Blues (1960)
1950-02	"Wandering Blues" b/w "Don't Go Baby"	King	Texas Slim	Sings Blues (1960)
1950-03	"Let Your Daddy Ride" b/w "Goin' on Highway #51"	Sensation	John Lee Hooker and His Guitar	N/A
1950-04	"No Friend Around" b/w "Wednesday Evening"	Modern	John Lee Hooker and His Guitar	A-side: N/A; B-side: Sings The Blues (1961)
1950-05	"Late Last Night" b/w "Don't You Remember Me"	King	Texas Slim	Sings Blues (1960)
1950-05	"My Baby's Got Something" b/w "Decoration Day Blues"	Sensation	John Lee Hooker and His Guitar	N/A
1950-07	"Thinking Blues" b/w "Moaning Blues"	King	Texas Slim	Sings Blues (1960)
1950-07	"Miss Eloise" b/w "Boogie Chillen' #2"	Sensation	John Lee Hooker and His Guitar	N/A
1950-08	"Give Me Your Phone Number" b/w "Roll 'n' Roll"	Modern	John Lee Hooker and His Guitar	N/A
1950-10	"Never Satisfied" b/w "Notoriety Woman"	Regal	John Lee Hooker and His Guitar	N/A
1950-11	"Wandering Blues" b/w "House Rent Boogie"	Staff	Johnny Williams and His Guitar	N/A
1950-12	"Let Your Daddy Ride" b/w "One More Time"	Modern	John Lee Hooker and His Guitar	A-side: Sings The Blues (1961); B-side: The Great John Lee Hooker (1963)
1950-12	"Boogie Now" b/w "Mad Man Blues"	Gone	John Lee Booker	Plays & Sings The Blues (1961)
1951-xx	"Prison Bound" b/w "Bumble Bee Blues"	Staff	Johnny Williams	N/A
1951-03	"John L's House Rent Boogie" b/w "Queen Bee"	Modern	John Lee Hooker	The Blues (1960)
1951-03	"Questionnaire Blues" b/w "Real Gone Gal"	Gotham	Johnny Williams	N/A
1951-05	"Tease Me Baby" b/w "Women in My Life"	Modern	John Lee Hooker	A-side: The Great John Lee Hooker (1963); B-side: N/A
1951-08	"Leave My Wife Alone" b/w "Ramblin' by Myself"	Chess	John Lee Booker	House Of The Blues (1959)
1951-09	"I'm in the Mood" b/w "How Can You Do It"	Modern	John Lee Hooker	A-side: The Blues (1960); B-side: The Great John Lee Hooker (1963)
1951-10	"Louise" b/w "Ground Hog Blues"	Chess	John Lee Booker	House Of The Blues (1959)
1951-11	"Miss Lorraine" b/w "Talkin' Boogie"	Chance	John Lee Booker and His Guitar	N/A
1951-12	"Turn Over a New Leaf (1952 Blues)" b/w "Anybody Seen My Baby"	Modern	John Lee Hooker	A-side: Sings The Blues (1961); B-side: The Blues (1960)
1952-xx	"Little Boy Blue" b/w "My Daddy Was a Jockey"	Gotham	Johnny Williams	N/A
1952-01	"I Love to Boogie" b/w "Graveyard Blues"	Chance	John Lee Booker and His Guitar	N/A
1952-03	"Mean Old Train" b/w "Catfish"	Gotham	John Lee	N/A
1952-03	"Cold Chills All Over Me" b/w "Rock Me Mama"	Modern	John Lee Hooker	A-side: The Blues (1960); B-side: Sings The Blues (1961)
1952-04	"High Priced Woman" b/w "Union Station Blues"	Chess	John Lee Hooker	House Of The Blues (1959)
1952-05	"Walkin' the Boogie" b/w "Sugar Mama"	Chess	John Lee Hooker	House Of The Blues (1959)
1952-06	"609 Boogie" b/w "Road Trouble"	Chance	John L. Booker and His Guitar	N/A
1952-07	"It Hurts Me So" b/w "I Got Eyes for You"	Modern	John Lee Hooker and "Little" Eddie Kirkland	The Great John Lee Hooker (1963)
1952-10	"Bluebird Blues" b/w "Key to the Highway"	Modern	John Lee Hooker	A-side: N/A; B-side: The Great John Lee Hooker (1963)
1953-xx	"No More Doggin'" b/w "Boogie Rambler"	JVB	Johnny Lee Hooker	N/A
1953-01	"Rock House Boogie" b/w "It's Been a Long Time Baby"	Modern	John Lee Hooker	A-side: Folk Blues (1962); B-side: N/A
1953-05	"It's Stormin' and Rainin'" b/w "Ride 'Till I Die"	Modern	John Lee Hooker	N/A
1953-07	"Love Money Can't Buy" b/w "Please Take Me Back"	Modern	John Lee Hooker	N/A
1953-09	"Blue Monday" b/w "Lovin' Guitar Man"	DeLuxe	John Lee Booker	A-side: N/A; B-side: Don't Turn Me From Your Door (1963)
1953-10	"Too Much Boogie" b/w "Need Somebody"	Modern	John Lee Hooker	N/A
1953-10	"I Came to See You Baby" b/w "I'm a Boogie Man"	DeLuxe	Johnny Lee	N/A
1954-01	"Pouring Down Rain" b/w "Stuttering Blues"	DeLuxe	John Lee Booker	A-side: N/A; B-side: Don't Turn Me From Your Door (1963)
1954-02	"Down Child" b/w "Gotta Boogie"	Modern	John Lee Hooker	Folk Blues (1962)
1954-03	"It's My Own Fault" b/w "Women and Money"	Chess	John Lee Hooker	House Of The Blues (1959)
1954-03	"My Baby Don't Love Me" b/w "Real, Real Gone"	DeLuxe	John Lee Booker	Don't Turn Me From Your Door (1963)
1954-05	"I Wonder Little Darling" b/w "Jump Me (One More Time)"	Modern	John Lee Hooker	N/A
1954-07	"I Tried Hard" b/w "Let's Talk it Over"	Modern	John Lee Hooker	A-side: N/A; B-side: Folk Blues (1962)
1954-08	"Everybody's Blues" b/w "I'm Mad"	Specialty	John Lee Hooker	N/A
1954-10	"Cool Little Car" b/w "Bad Boy"	Modern	John Lee Hooker	A-side: N/A; B-side: Folk Blues (1962)
1955-01	"Half a Stranger" b/w "Shake, Holler and Run"	Modern	John Lee Hooker	Folk Blues (1962)
1955-05	"You Receive Me" b/w "Taxi Driver"	Modern	John Lee Hooker	N/A
1955-08	"Hug and Squeeze" b/w "The Syndicator"	Modern	John Lee Hooker	Sings The Blues (1961)
1955-10	"Lookin' for a Woman" b/w "I'm Ready"	Modern	John Lee Hooker	A-side: Folk Blues (1962); B-side: N/A

== Singles in the charts ==
List of charting singles with year, title, and peak chart positions
Year	Title	Peak chart positions					
Year	Title	US R&B	US Hot 100	UK	NL	BEL (FL)	NZ
1948	"Boogie Chillen'"	1	—	—	—	—	—
1949	"Hobo Blues"	5	—	—	—	—	—
1949	"Hoogie Boogie"	9	—	—	—	—	—
1949	"Crawlin' King Snake"	6	—	—	—	—	—
1950	"Huckle Up, Baby"	15	—	—	—	—	—
1951	"I'm in the Mood"	1	30	—	—	—	—
1958	"I Love You Honey"	29	—	—	—	—	—
1960	"No Shoes"	21	—	—	—	—	—
1962	"Boom Boom"	16	60	—	—	—	—
1964	"Dimples"	—	—	23	—	—	—
1990	"The Healer" (with Carlos Santana)	—	—	—	9	12	23
1990	"I'm in the Mood" (with Bonnie Raitt)	—	—	14	22	—	—
1992	"Boom Boom"	—	—	16	—	—	—
1993	"Boogie at Russian Hill"	—	—	53	—	—	—
1995	"Chill Out (Things Gonna Change)"	—	—	45	—	—	—
1996	"Baby Lee" (with Robert Cray, from Lee TV commercial)	—	—	65	—	—	—
"—" denotes single that did not chart or was not released in that territory.

== Bibliography ==
- Erlewine, Michael; Bogdanov, Vladimir; Woodstra, Chris; Koda, Cub, eds. (1996). "Reviews". All Music Guide to the Blues. San Francisco: Miller Freeman Books. ISBN 0-87930-424-3.
- Leadbitter, Mike; Slaven, Neil (1987). Blues Records, 1943–1970: A Selective Discography – Volume 1. England: Record Information Services. ISBN 978-0907872085.
- Murray, Charles Shaar (2002). Boogie Man: The Adventures of John Lee Hooker in the American Twentieth Century. New York City: Macmillan. ISBN 978-0-312-27006-3.
- Thompson, Dave (2019). Goldmine Record Album Price Guide. Penguin Group. ISBN 978-1440248917.
- Whitburn, Joel (1988). "John Lee Hooker". Top R&B Singles 1942–1988. Menomonee Falls, Wisconsin: Record Research. ISBN 0-89820-068-7.
