= Burning Hell =

Studio album by John Lee Hooker
- Released: 1964
- Recorded: April 20, 1959
- Studio: United Sound Systems, Detroit, Michigan
- Genre: Blues
- Length: 43:00
- Label: Riverside
- Producer: Bill Grauer

John Lee Hooker chronology
John Lee Hooker on Campus (1963)	Burning Hell (1964)	Concert at Newport (1964)

Burning Hell is an album by blues musician John Lee Hooker that was recorded in Detroit in 1959 at the same sessions that produced The Country Blues of John Lee Hooker, but not released by the Riverside label until 1964 in Europe.

== Reception ==
Professional ratings
Review scores
Source	Rating
AllMusic	3.5/5 stars
The Virgin Encyclopedia of The Blues	4/5 stars
(The New) Rolling Stone Album Guide	4/5 stars
The Penguin Guide to Blues Recordings	2/4 stars
Record Mirror	1/5 stars

AllMusic reviewer Richie Unterberger stated: "Burning Hell ranks among John Lee Hooker's most edgy and focused performances. A companion piece to The Country Blues of John Lee Hooker, it finds Hooker singing country-blues, accompanied only by his own acoustic guitar – something he rarely did after traveling north from the Mississippi Delta ... Hooker shows himself to be an excellent interpreter who could have held his own with Delta bluesmen of any era. Although his guitar playing is pretty raw even by blues standards, Hooker more than compensates with his powerful, resonant voice".

== Track listing ==
All compositions credited to John Lee Hooker except where noted

1. "Burning Hell" – 3:17
2. "Graveyard Blues" – 3:38
3. "Baby, Please Don't Go" (Big Joe Williams) – 4:49
4. "Jackson, Tennessee" – 3:20
5. "You Live Your Life & I'll Live Mine" – 3:21
6. "Smokestack Lightnin'" (Chester Burnett) – 3:22
7. "How Can You Do It" – 2:57
8. "I Don't Want No Woman If Her Hair Ain't No Longer Than Mine (Short-Haired Woman)" (Sam Hopkins) – 3:15
9. "I Rolled and Turned and Cried the Whole Night Long" – 3:47
10. "Blues for My Baby" – 3:37
11. "Key to the Highway" (Charlie Segar, Big Bill Broonzy) – 3:15
12. "Natchez Fire (Burning)" (Burnett) – 3:02

== Personnel ==
- John Lee Hooker – guitar, vocals
