= Roy Rogers (guitarist) =

American musician (born 1950)

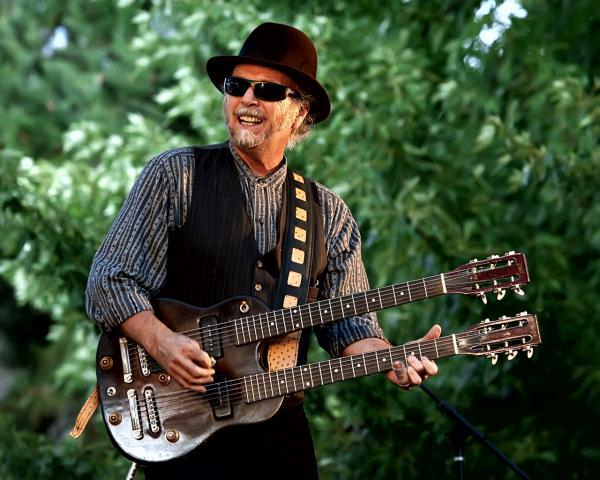
- Roy Rogers

Background information
- Born: July 28, 1950 (age 76); Redding, California, United States
- Genres: Rock, blues, blues rock, country
- Occupations: Musician, record producer
- Instruments: Guitar, vocals
- Years active: 1978-present
- Website: Official website

Roy Rogers (born July 28, 1950, Redding, California, United States) is an American blues rock slide guitarist and record producer. He was named after the singing cowboy. Rogers plays a variety of guitar styles related to the Delta blues, but is most often recognized for his virtuoso slide work.

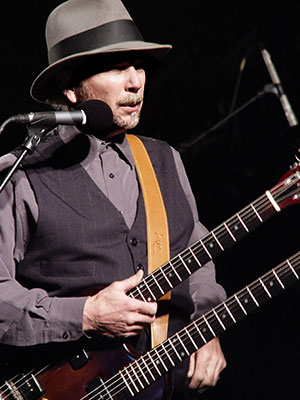
Roy Rogers

== Career ==
In the 1980s, Rogers was a member of John Lee Hooker's Coast to Coast Band. Rogers produced four John Lee Hooker albums - The Healer, a Grammy Award winner, Mr. Lucky, Boom Boom and Chill Out. He also produced two Grammy nominated recordings for Ramblin' Jack Elliott entitled Friends of Mine and A Long Ride. Rogers also co-wrote "Gnawnin' On It", which was nominated for 'Best Female Rock Vocal' for Bonnie Raitt, a long-time friend and collaborator.

Rogers has performed and/or recorded with for a diverse spectrum of artists including Linda Ronstadt, Sammy Hagar, Bonnie Raitt, Zucchero, John Gorka and Ramblin' Jack Elliott, Elvin Bishop, Carlos Santana, Steve Miller, and Ray Manzarek. Since 1980, Rogers has also fronted his own trio, The Delta Rhythm Kings. In 2003, Roger's own Slideways reached number 3 on Billboard's chart for "Top Blues Albums." Split Decision also charted in 2009. He has also been nominated for a Blues Music Award for 'Best Blues Guitar Instrumentalist' by the Blues Foundation. Other awards include those from France and Australia with long-time friend Norton Buffalo. His most recent release is his first solo album in five years, titled Into The Wild Blue, released by Chops Not Chaps Records in June 2015. His releases have been received worldwide, as he has been touring Europe, Brazil, Australia, and Scandinavia since 1982.

== Discography ==
- Rogers And Burgin: A Foot In The Door (1978 Waterhouse Records)
- Chops Not Chaps (1986, Blind Pig Records)
- Slidewinder (1988, Blind Pig Records)
- Blues on the Range (1989, Blind Pig Records)
- R&B with Norton Buffalo (1991, Blind Pig Records)
- Slidewinder (1992, Blind Pig Records)
- Travellin' Tracks with Norton Buffalo (1992, Blind Pig Records)
- Slide of Hand (1993, Liberty)
- Slide Zone (1994, Capitol)
- Rhythm & Groove (1996, Pointblank)
- Pleasure & Pain (1998, Pointblank)
- Everybody's Angel (1999, Roshan)
- Slideways (2002, Evidence)
- Roots of Our Nature with Norton Buffalo (2002, Blind Pig Records)
- Live! At The Sierra Nevada Brewery Big Room (2004, Chops Not Chaps)
- Slide Guitar For Rock & Blues (2005, Chops Not Chaps)
- Crossing with Reidar Larsen (2006, Chops Not Chaps)
- The Best of Two – Slide Zone and Slide of Hand (2007, Chops Not Chaps)
- Ballads Before The Rain (with Ray Manzarek) (2008, Friday Music)
- Split Decision (2009, Blind Pig Records)
- Translucent Blues (with Ray Manzarek) (2011, Blind Pig Records)
- Twisted Tales (with Ray Manzarek) (2013, Chops Not Chaps)
- Blues in the Heart (2013, X5 Music Group) – Includes track Seven Hearts (featuring Roy Rogers and Norton Buffalo), time 6:17
- Into The Wild Blue (2015, Chops Not Chaps)

== See also ==
- San Francisco Blues Festival
