= Original Folk Blues =

- United reissue

Compilation album by John Lee Hooker
- Released: 1967
- Recorded: Detroit, Michigan 1948–1954
- Genre: Blues
- Length: 36:02
- Label: Kent

Original Folk Blues is a compilation album by the American bluesman John Lee Hooker, released in 1967. It mostly features songs that Hooker recorded for Bernard Besman in Detroit, Michigan, between 1948 and 1954 they were originally issued by Modern Records.

== Background ==
During the mid-1960s American folk music revival, there was increased interest in older blues music. Chess Records responded with its The Real Folk Blues series of albums, which compiled earlier singles by several of its most popular blues artists, including Hooker. An article in Billboard magazine noted that Los Angeles-based Kent Records was "inspired by the recent success attained by Chess [in attracting] an audience of collegians and young blues fans".

Kent part-owner Saul Bihari (also known as "Sam Ling" for songwriting royalties) explained that while contemporary rhythm and blues radio stations were ignoring older blues styles, many white musicians were seeking to "imitate the sounds of the early 'low down' blues artists like John Lee Hooker", which generated broader interest in the originals. To meet this need, the first releases in the Kent series included albums by Elmore James, Howlin' Wolf, Lightning Hopkins, Smokey Hogg, and Hooker.

== Critical reception ==
Professional ratings
Review scores
| Source | Rating |
|---|---|
| AllMusic (Ace reissue) | 4/5 stars |
| The Penguin Guide to Blues Recordings (Ace reissue) | 4/4 stars |
| The New Rolling Stone Record Guide | 3/5 stars |

In a review of a 2002 reissue by Ace Records, AllMusic reviewer Steve Leggett gave the album four out of five stars and wrote:

Included here are Hooker's first versions of "Boogie Chillen'", "Crawlin' King Snake", and "Sally Mae", each of which is classic Hooker, as rough and raw as a Delta wind blowing shards of glass up the Detroit River ... These Modern [original singles label] releases have appeared time and time again on various Hooker collections, but there is the feel of something special about this particular package. It's all ragged and delightfully unhinged, which is the only way to go with John Lee Hooker.

== Track listing ==
=== Original album ===
Details are taken from the original Kent Records album liner notes and may differ from other sources. Since songwriting credits were not included, the 2002 Ace Records reissue liner notes are used for the songwriters. Except where noted, Hooker is listed for all songs, with additional credit given to original singles producer Bernard Besman.

Side one
| No. | Title | Length |
|---|---|---|
| 1. | "Boogie Chillen" | 3:05 |
| 2. | "Queen Bee" | 2:37 |
| 3. | "Crawling King Snake" (Tony Hollins) | 2:59 |
| 4. | "Weeping Willow" | 2:50 |
| 5. | "Whistling and Moaning" | 3:07 |
| 6. | "Sally Mae" | 3:05 |

Side two
| No. | Title | Length |
|---|---|---|
| 1. | "I Need Love So Bad" (Percy Mayfield) | 3:25 |
| 2. | "Let's Talk It Over" (Davis) | 2:55 |
| 3. | "The Syndicate" (Hooker, Jules Taub a.k.a. Jules Bihari) | 3:00 |
| 4. | "Let Your Daddy Ride" | 2:55 |
| 5. | "Driftin' from Door to Door" | 2:58 |
| 6. | "Baby I'm Gonna Miss You" | 2:33 |

=== Reissues ===
Original Folk Blues has been reissued by several record companies, including United/Superior Records and in 2002 by Ace Records, as an expanded album with six extra songs in addition to the twelve from the original release.

Ace reissue extra songs
| No. | Title | Length |
|---|---|---|
| 13. | "Cold Chills" (Williamson) | 3:06 |
| 14. | "Cool Little Car" | 3:14 |
| 15. | "I Wonder Little Darling" | 3:07 |
| 16. | "Jump Me One More Time" (Joe Josea a.k.a. Joe Bihari) | 2:30 |
| 17. | "Lookin' for a Woman" | 3:12 |
| 18. | "Ride 'Til I Die" | 2:56 |
