= Wiregrass Blues Festival =

American annual music festival

The Wiregrass Blues Festival is an annual blues festival hosted by the Wiregrass Blues Society in Dothan, Alabama. It began in 2011 as a tribute concert to the late country-bluesman and Dothan, Alabama native Eddie Kirkland. The festival currently takes place in April each year with multiple programs and live music performances. The Wiregrass Blues Festival aims to celebrate and illuminate the pioneering contributions of blues musicians from the Wiregrass Region. The festival includes over four live blues or blues-inspired performances with supporting programs that precede the festival, such as Blues-in-Schools, honoree award ceremony, and a community meet and greet accompanied with a panel discussion of blues historians and musicians.

== History ==
The Wiregrass Blues Festival was founded in 2011 as a tribute to the local Eddie Kirkland, who died in a car crash.
