= Urban Blues =

Urban Blues may refer to:

- Urban blues, a musical style
- Urban Blues (John Lee Hooker album), 1967
- Urban Blues (Leroy Jenkins album), 1984
