= Sugar Hill (club) =

Blues and jazz club in San Francisco, California

Sugar Hill, also known as Sugar Hill: Home of the Blues was a blues and jazz club in San Francisco's Broadway in the North Beach district of San Francisco, California. It was established by Barbara Dane, in May 1961, with the idea of creating a venue for the blues in a tourist district where a wider audience could hear it. There Dane performed regularly with her two most constant musical companions: Kenny "Good News" Whitson on piano and cornet and Wellman Braud, former Ellington bassist. Among her guest artists were Jimmy Rushing, Mose Allison, Mama Yancey, Tampa Red, Lonnie Johnson, Big Mama Thornton, Lightnin' Hopkins, T-Bone Walker, Brownie McGhee and Sonny Terry.

Carmen McRae performed at the club in 1963, recording a live album there with pianist Norman Simmons, bassist Vic Sproules and drummer Stew Martin. A Billboard review wrote of it: "Miss McRae sings up a storm, exhibiting not only her highly polished and formidable style but much warmth, humor and that little something extra that makes for an inspired performance". In November 1962, John Lee Hooker also recorded a live album at the club. Live at Sugar Hill was released in 1963.

Lonnie Johnson, who appeared at the club in early 1962, wrote a song, "Fine Booze and Heavy Dues", in honor of his appearance there. The song appears on his 1962 album Lonnie Johnson:Another Night To Cry.
