= Come See About Me (disambiguation) =

"Come See About Me" is a 1964 song by The Supremes.

Come See About Me may also refer to:

- Come See About Me (Neil Sedaka album) (1983)
- Come See About Me (Freda Payne album) (2000)
- Come See About Me (DVD), a 2004 concert film by John Lee Hooker
- "Come See About Me", a 2018 song by Nicki Minaj from Queen
