= More Real Folk Blues: The Missing Album =

Studio album by John Lee Hooker
- Released: 1991
- Recorded: Chicago, May 1966
- Genre: Blues
- Label: Chess
- Producer: Ralph Bass

John Lee Hooker chronology
| Mr. Lucky (1991) | More Real Folk Blues: The Missing Album (1991) | Boom Boom (1993) |

More Real Folk Blues: The Missing Album is a record by blues guitarist and singer John Lee Hooker that was recorded in Chicago in 1966 at the same sessions for The Real Folk Blues but not released by the Chess label until 1991.

== Reception ==
Professional ratings
Review scores
| Source | Rating |
|---|---|
| AllMusic | 3/5 stars |

AllMusic reviewer Bill Dahl stated: "Produced by Ralph Bass in 1966 but not issued by Chess at the time, More Real Folk Blues was unearthed by MCA only a few years back. It's no masterpiece, but certainly deserved release in its day – backed by Burns and a Chicago rhythm section that copes as well as can be expected with Hooker's singular sense of timing".

== Track listing ==
All compositions credited to John Lee Hooker

1. "This Land Is Nobody's Land" – 4:31
2. "Deep Blue Sea" – 3:35
3. "Nobody Knows" – 4:24
4. "Mustang Sally & GTO" – 4:38
5. "Lead Me" – 4:44
6. "Catfish" – 7:25
7. "I Can't Quit You Baby" – 3:27
8. "Want Ad Blues" – 6:09
9. "House Rent Blues" – 3:49

== Personnel ==
- John Lee Hooker – guitar, vocals
- Lafayette Leake – piano, organ (tracks 2, 4, 5 & 7–9)
- Eddie Burns – guitar
- Other unidentified musicians – bass, tambourine
- Fred Below – drums
