= Paredon Records =

American record label

Paredon Records was a record label founded in 1969 by Barbara Dane and Irwin Silber to publish recordings of cultural expressions, especially protests, in order to preserve them. Paredon wanted to spread awareness of multiple movements and topics. Dane and Silber were both connected with politically engaged artists and musicians, as well as progressive groups, through their work. Dane formed friendships with artists she met while protesting the Vietnam War and other current events. Her active participation in these movements provided her with the inside knowledge and ear to recognize whose voices would be historically significant. Part of the era's social activism and movements for economic, racial and social justice, as well as national liberation, the label released 50 titles between 1970 and 1985 including songs, poetry and oratory. The label's founders were inspired by Cuba and recorded a lot of protest music, including The People Gonna Rise! with Bev Grant's band Human Condition.

Paredon Records released music from a diverse range of artists, including traditional folk musicians, protest singers, and revolutionary groups from countries such as Chile, Cuba, Nicaragua, and Vietnam. The label's releases covered a wide range of political and social issues, including anti-imperialism, anti-fascism, anti-racism, and workers' rights.

Some of Paredon Records' most notable releases included "Songs of the Spanish Civil War" (1976), which featured recordings of songs from the Spanish Civil War performed by various artists; "El Salvador: The People's Will" (1981), which documented the struggle against the right-wing government in El Salvador; and "Nicaragua vencerá" (1982), a collection of songs in support of the Sandinista government in Nicaragua.

Dane and Silber donated Paredon Records to the Smithsonian Institution in 1991 "to insure the availability of this material to posterity" and their recordings are now part of Smithsonian Folkways. Dane performed in front of large crowds of students and workers across the US and on national television, while Silber addressed meetings of cultural leaders and intellectuals. Bravo planned a conference of international artists participating in global political movements the following year to share their songs and views. The Encuentro de Canción Protesta, which took place at the Casa de las Américas, encouraged Dane and Silber to start a record label in order to make the voices of the people heard.
