= Goin' Down Highway 51 =

Compilation album by John Lee Hooker
- Released: 1971
- Recorded: September 3, 1948 – April 2, 1951
- Genre: Blues
- Length: 30:08
- Label: Specialty
- Producer: Bernie Besman

John Lee Hooker chronology
Hooker 'n Heat (1971)	Goin' Down Highway 51 (1971)	Endless Boogie (1971)

Goin' Down Highway 51 is an album by blues musician John Lee Hooker, compiling tracks originally recorded for Bernie Besman between 1948 and 1951, that was released by the Specialty label in 1971.

== Reception ==
An AllMusic review notes: "this LP brings you early recordings of Hooker in his absolute prime. These sides were recorded in Detroit not long after the singer/guitarist's arrival in the Motor City from his native Mississippi".

== Track listing ==
All compositions credited to John Lee Hooker

1. "My Baby's Got Something" – 2:48
2. "Grinder Man" – 3:10
3. "Four Women in My Life" – 3:11
4. "Goin' Down Highway 51" – 2:28
5. "Sail On Little Girl" – 2:15
6. "Miss Sadie Mae" – 2:46
7. "Alberta - Part 2" – 2:42
8. "21 Boogie" – 2:50
9. "Find Me a Woman" – 2:39
10. "Hastings Street Boogie" – 2:18
11. "Canal Street Blues" – 2:44
12. "Strike Blues" – 2:37
13. "War Is Over (Goodbye California)" – 2:45
14. "Henry's Swing Club" – 3:09
- Recorded in Detroit on September 3, 1948 (tracks 13 & 14), February 16 or 18, 1949 (track 10), July 1949 (tracks 5–7), December 1949 (track 11), February 8 or 27, 1950 (track 4), April 28, 1950 (tracks 8 & 12), November 16, 1950 (track 2) and April 2, 1951 (tracks 3 & 9)

== Personnel ==
- John Lee Hooker – guitar, vocals
- Eddie Kirkland – guitar, vocals
