= Barbara Dane =

American folk, blues and jazz singer (1927–2024)

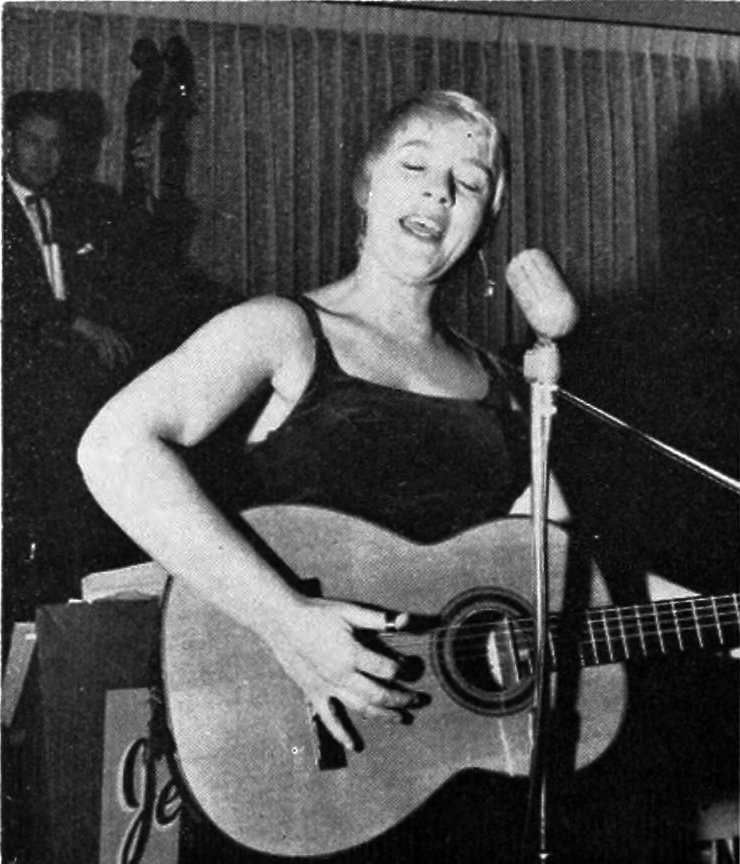
- Dane performing in 1960

Background information
- Born: Barbara Jean Spillman; May 12, 1927; Detroit, Michigan, U.S.
- Died: October 20, 2024 (aged 97) Oakland, California, U.S.
- Genres: Jazz; vocal jazz; folk; blues
- Occupation: Singer
- Instruments: Vocals; guitar
- Label: Smithsonian Folkways
- Website: barbaradane.net

Barbara Jean Spillman (May 12, 1927 – October 20, 2024), known professionally as Barbara Dane, was an American folk, blues and jazz singer, guitarist, record producer, and political activist. She co-founded Paredon Records with Irwin Silber.

Jazz critic Leonard Feather described Dane as "Bessie Smith in stereo" in the late 1950s. Time wrote of Dane: "The voice is pure, rich ... rare as a 20-carat diamond" and quoted Louis Armstrong's exclamation upon hearing her at the Pasadena jazz festival: "Did you get that chick? She's a gasser!" On the occasion of her 85th birthday, The Boston Globe music critic James Reed called her "one of the true unsung heroes of American music."

== Early life ==
Dane's parents were from Arkansas, and arrived in Detroit where she was born in the 1920s. Her father Gilbert Spillman was a pharmacist who ran his own store, and her mother Dorothy (Roleson) Spillman was a professional bridge player. She was the oldest of three children. In the 1930s, when she was nine years old, her father chastised her for serving a Coca-Cola to a Black man, and he ejected the man from his store. She later remembered that watershed moment: "I took him inside my heart and bonded with his hurt, identified with the denial of his personhood."

She graduated from Redford High School in Detroit and briefly attended Wayne State University. She began to sing regularly at demonstrations for racial equality and economic justice. While still in her teens, she sat in with bands locally and won the interest of local music promoters. She received an offer to tour with Alvino Rey's band, but she turned it down in favor of singing at factory gates and in union halls.

== Career as singer ==
To Ebony magazine, she seemed "startlingly blonde, especially when that powerful dusky alto voice begins to moan of trouble, two-timing men and freedom ... with stubborn determination, enthusiasm and a basic love for the underdog, [she is] making a name for herself ... aided and abetted by some of the oldest names in jazz who helped give birth to the blues." The seven-page article was filled with photos of Dane working with Memphis Slim, Willie Dixon, Muddy Waters, Clara Ward, Mama Yancey, Little Brother Montgomery, and others.

By 1959, Louis Armstrong had asked Time magazine readers: "Did you get that chick? She's a gasser!" After his invitation, she appeared with Armstrong on the nationally screened Timex All-Star Jazz Show hosted by Jackie Gleason on January 7, 1959. She toured the East Coast with Jack Teagarden, appeared in Chicago with Art Hodes, Roosevelt Sykes, Little Brother Montgomery, Memphis Slim, Otis Spann, Willie Dixon, and others, played New York with Wilbur De Paris and his band, and appeared on The Tonight Show Starring Johnny Carson as a solo guest artist. Dane's other television work included The Steve Allen Show, Bobby Troup's Stars of Jazz, and Alfred Hitchcock Presents.

In 1961, she opened her own club, Sugar Hill: Home of the Blues, on San Francisco's Broadway in the North Beach district, with the idea of creating a venue for the blues in a tourist district where a larger audience could hear it. At this location, Dane performed regularly with her two most constant musical companions: Kenny "Good News" Whitson on piano and cornet and Wellman Braud, a former Duke Ellington bassist.

In her speech to the GI Movement of the Vietnam War Era (whose text can be found in the booklet included in Paredon Records' 1970 FTA! Songs of the GI Resistance LP), Barbara Dane said, "I was too stubborn to hire one of the greed-head managers, probably because I'm a woman who likes to speak for herself. I always made my own deals and contracts, and after figuring out the economics of it, I was free to choose when and where I worked, able to spend lots more time with my three children and doing political work, and even brought home more money in the end, by not going for the 'bigtime.' I did make some really nice records, because I was able to choose and work with wonderfully gifted musicians."

Dane was portrayed by singer Sarah King in the film A Complete Unknown.

== Political activism ==
She was the Michigan teenage director of American Youth for Democracy in the early 1940s, which was at that time the youth wing of the Communist Party USA. She was expelled from the Communist Party in the late 1940s, along with her husband at the time, folk musician Rolf Cahn.

She was part of a successful campaign in the early 1960s to prevent Pacific Gas & Electric from constructing the Bodega Bay Nuclear Power Plant. In organizing the resistance to that plan, she recorded an album on the Fantasy label with Wally Rose, Bob Helm, Bob Mielke, and Lu Watters. It included the title track, "Blues Over Bodega", and another tune, "San Andreas Fault".

She stepped up her work in the movements for peace and justice as the struggle for civil rights spread and the Vietnam War escalated. She sang at peace demonstrations in Washington, D.C., and throughout the U.S. and toured anti-war GI coffeehouses all over the world. In 1966, Dane became the first U.S. musician to tour post-revolutionary Cuba, during which Fidel Castro visited with her for three hours while she was doing her laundry at her hotel.

In January 1964, Bob Dylan praised Dane's commitment in an open letter he wrote to Broadside magazine: "the heroes of this battle are not me and Joan [Baez] and The Kingston Trio... but there's some that could use the money I mean people like Tom Paxton, Barbara Dane and Johnny Herald... they are the heroes if such a word has to be used here... we need more kind a people like that people that can't go against their conscience no matter what they might gain and I've come to think that that might be the most important thing in the whole wide world."

In 1970, Dane founded Paredon Records with husband Irwin Silber, a label specializing in international protest music. She produced nearly 50 albums, including three of her own, over a 12-year period. The label was later incorporated into Smithsonian Folkways, a label of the Smithsonian Institution, and is available through its catalog.

In 1978, Dane appeared with Pete Seeger at a rally in New York for striking coal miners.

== Blues singer and role model ==
When Dane was in her late 70s, Philip Elwood, jazz critic of the San Francisco Examiner, said of her: "Dane is back and beautiful... she has an immense voice, remarkably well-tuned... capable of exquisite presentations regardless of the material. As a gut-level blues singer, she is without compare." Blues writer Lee Hildebrand calls her "perhaps the finest living interpreter of the classic blues of the 1920s." In a 2010 KALW profile on Dane, produced by Steven Short, blues musician Bonnie Raitt said "she's always been a role model and a hero of mine – musically and politically. I mean, the arc of her life so informs mine that – she's – I really can't think of anyone I admire [more], the way that she's lived her life."

== Personal life and death ==
Dane was married three times. Her first marriage (1946-1950) was with folk singer Rolf Cahn. Their son, Jesse Cahn, also became a folk musician. Dane had two children with her second husband, jeweler Byron Menéndez, whom she divorced in 1963. Their son Pablo Menéndez leads Mezcla, a multicultural musical ensemble in Cuba. Nina Menéndez, Dane's daughter, was the artistic director of the Bay Area Flamenco Festival and Festival Flamenco Gitano until her death in 2025. In 1964, Dane married Irwin Silber, a New Communist movement activist and former editor of Sing Out! magazine. They remained married until Silber died in 2010. They resided in Oakland, California.

On October 20, 2024, Dane, who had heart failure, died through assisted suicide at her home in Oakland, under the provisions of the California End of Life Option Act. She was 97.

== Discography ==
- Trouble in Mind (San Francisco, 1957)
- A Night at the Ash Grove (World Pacific, 1958)
- Livin' With the Blues with Earl Fatha Hines, Benny Carter and Shelly Manne (Dot, 1959)
- I'm On My Way / Go 'Way From My Window (Trey, 1960)
- On My Way (Capitol, 1962)
- When I Was a Young Girl (Horizon, 1962)
- Sings the Blues with 6 & 12 String Guitar (Folkways, 1964)
- Lightning Hopkins with His Brothers Joel and John Henry / Lightning Hopkins with Barbara Dane (Arhoolie, 1964 [1966])
- Barbara Dane and the Chambers Brothers with The Chambers Brothers (Folkways, 1966)
- FTA! Songs of the GI Resistance (Paredon, 1970)
- I Hate the Capitalist System (Paredon, 1973)
- When We Make It Through (Paredon, 1982)
- Sometimes I Believe She Loves Me with Lightnin' Hopkins (Arhoolie, 1996)
- What Are You Gonna Do When There Ain't No Jazz? (GHB, 2002)
- Live! at the Ash Grove: New Years Eve 1961–62 (Dreadnaught, 2004)
- Throw It Away with Tammy Hall (Dreadnaught, 2016)
- Hot Jazz, Cool Blues & Hard-Hitting Songs (Smithsonian Folkways, 2018)

== Selected filmography ==
- The Alfred Hitchcock Hour (1962) (Season 1 Episode 5: "Captive Audience") as Folk Singer
- The 9 Lives of Barbara Dane (2023)

== Books ==
- This Bell Still Rings: My Life of Defiance and Song, by Barbara Dane, Heday Books, 2022

== See also ==
- Trikont Musikverlag
