= Rolf Cahn =

- Born: Rolf Cahn; August 14, 1924; Germany
- Died: August 1, 1994 (aged 69) Santa Fe, New Mexico
- Genres: Folk
- Instrument(s): Guitar, Vocals

Rolf Cahn (August 14, 1924 – August 1, 1994) was an American folk musician, martial arts teacher, author, radio dj, and social activist. Born in Germany, he and his family, who were Jewish, fled from Adolf Hitler's oppression and arrived in the United States in 1937. They settled in Detroit, Michigan. Cahn later moved to Cambridge, Massachusetts, and thence to Berkeley, California and on to Santa Fe, New Mexico. In the 1960s Cahn hosted a Bay Area radio show and gave guitar lessons from his walk-up apartment on San Pablo Avenue in Berkeley.

== Folk music career ==
Cahn played guitar and recorded several albums of folk music during the time he lived in Berkeley. He was married for a time to the folk and blues singer Barbara Dane, and their son, Jesse Cahn, also became a folk musician. Cahn and Dane were members of the Communist Party USA until the late 1940s, when they were expelled, at least in part because Cahn accepted a policeman as a martial arts student.

In 1962 Cahn was one of the co-founders (with Debbie Green and Howard Ziehm) of The Cabale, at 2504 San Pablo Avenue in Berkeley, a folk club that featured performers like Mississippi John Hurt, Jesse Fuller, Elizabeth Cotten, Lightnin' Hopkins, and The Chambers Brothers. The Cabale closed in mid 1965.

== K'ang jo fu ==
Cahn popularized a self-defense technique called k'ang jo fu (also known as kang jo fu or "the kang") in his 1974 book K'ang Jo Fu: Self Defense for Gentle People.

K'ang jo fu can loosely be translated as "the way of health". Cahn learned the martial art from a visiting Chinese professor at UC Berkeley, Ch'eng Hsue' Yi in 1943. Ch'eng returned to China and Rolf continued to study and teach kang. One of his students, Robert Rawlings, described as a young boy in the introduction of Cahn's 1974 book, taught kang jo fu to martial artist and acupuncturist Charles Peri, who continues to teach kang jo fu in Novato, California. Although kang jo fu is based on a 95-movement form, it does not attach its movements to any ideology or scenario and can be described as pure form. It is described as placing a practitioner inside of everyone else's time and all directions (like bagua and xinyi).

== Discography ==
- A Night at The Ashgrove (World Pacific, 1958)
- California Folk Concert with Rolf Cahn (Folkways Records, 1959)
- Rolf Cahn and Eric Von Schmidt (Folkways, 1961)
- If You Ain't Got The Do-Re-Mi (Smithsonian Folkways, 2007)

== Death ==
On August 1, 1994, aged 69, Cahn died in Santa Fe, New Mexico, where he had been living for many years and was a well-loved local personality.
