= The Big Soul of John Lee Hooker =

Studio album by John Lee Hooker
- Released: 1963
- Recorded: Chicago, January 1962
- Genre: Blues
- Length: 26:22
- Label: Vee-Jay

John Lee Hooker chronology
John Lee Hooker (1962)	The Big Soul of John Lee Hooker (1963)	Don't Turn Me from Your Door (1963)

The Big Soul of John Lee Hooker is an album by the blues musician John Lee Hooker, recorded in Chicago and released by the Vee-Jay label in 1963.

== Reception ==
Professional ratings
Review scores
Source	Rating
AllMusic	3/5 stars
Record Mirror	4/5 stars
The Penguin Guide to Blues Recordings	2.5/4 stars
The Virgin Encyclopedia of The Blues	3/5 stars

AllMusic reviewer Bruce Eder stated: "John Lee Hooker gives us value for every second there is, and in a totally unexpected setting. Jumping into the R&B and soul explosions of the early '60s ... this is near-essential listening as some of Hooker's most interesting work of the '60s".

== Track listing ==
All compositions credited to John Lee Hooker

1. "San Francisco" – 2:46
2. "Take a Look at Yourself" – 2:48
3. "Send Me Your Pillow" – 2:25
4. "She Shot Me Down" – 2:50
5. "I Love Her" – 2:14
6. "Old Time Shimmy" – 2:21
7. "You Know I Love You" – 1:56
8. "Big Soul" – 2:09
9. "Good Rockin' Mama" – 2:28
10. "Onions" – 2:10
11. "No One Told Me" – 2:08

== Personnel ==
- John Lee Hooker – guitar, lead vocals
- Unidentified musician – trumpet
- Hank Cosby – tenor saxophone
- Andrew "Mike" Terry – baritone saxophone
- Joe Hunter – keyboards
- Larry Veeder – guitar
- James Jamerson – bass
- Benny Benjamin – drums
- Mary Wilson, The Andantes – backing vocals (tracks 1, 2, 4, 5 & 8)
