= Sittin' Here Thinkin' =

Compilation album by John Lee Hooker
- Released: 1979
- Recorded: Newark, New Jersey, late 1961
- Genre: Blues
- Length: 44:30
- Label: Muse
- Producer: Fred Mendelsohn

John Lee Hooker chronology
The Cream (1978)	Sittin' Here Thinkin' (1979)	Jealous (1986)

Sittin' Here Thinkin', also released as Sad and Lonesome, is an album by blues musician John Lee Hooker. It was released by the Muse label in 1979. The recordings date to the late 1950s, with performances by unknown musicians.

== Reception ==
Professional ratings
Review scores
Source	Rating
AllMusic	4.5/5 stars
The Penguin Guide to Blues Recordings	3/4 stars

AllMusic reviewer Tom Schulte stated: "John Lee Hooker is a master of the primal, hypnotic Delta blues. Accompanied by nothing other than a bare beat of the drums (if not only the stomp of his own feet), "The Healer" can mesmerize. The simple, but effective, tools of his trade are one-chord songs and a ton of downbeat emotion".

== Track listing ==
All compositions credited to John Lee Hooker

1. "I Bought You a Brand New Home" – 3:27
2. "I Believe I'll Lose My Mind" – 3:46
3. "Teasin' Me" – 3:35
4. "My Cryin' Days Are Over" – 3:20
5. "Sittin' Here Thinkin'" – 3:21
6. "Mean Mistreatin'" – 4:10
7. "How Long?" – 3:20
8. "How Many More Years?" – 3:33
9. "C.C. Rider" (Traditional) – 3:39
10. "Sad and Lonesome" – 4:36
11. "Can't You See What You're Doin' to Me?" – 4:45
12. "When My Wife Quit Me" – 3:41

== Personnel ==
- John Lee Hooker – lead guitar, vocals
- Unidentified musicians – guitar, bass, drums
