= House of the Blues =

Compilation album by John Lee Hooker
- Released: 1959
- Recorded: Chicago, Illinois, & Detroit, Michigan, 1951–1952
- Genre: Blues
- Length: 35:52
- Label: Chess
- Producer: Joe Von Battle; Leonard Chess; Bernie Besman

Professional ratings
Review scores
Source	Rating
AllMusic	4/5 stars
The Encyclopedia of Popular Music	4/5 stars
Record Mirror	3/5 stars
The Rolling Stone Album Guide	4/5 stars

House of the Blues is an album by blues musician John Lee Hooker, compiling tracks originally released as singles between 1951 and 1952. Chess Records issued the album in 1959.

== Reception ==
AllMusic reviewer Bill Dahl stated: "This 1959 Chess album collects 1951–1954 efforts by John Lee Hooker. Some important titles here."

== Track listing ==
All compositions credited to John Lee Hooker

1. "Walkin' the Boogie" 3:08
2. "Love Blues" – 3:00
3. "Union Station Blues" – 2:31
4. "It's My Own Fault" – 2:22
5. "Leave My Wife Alone" – 2:34
6. "Ramblin' By Myself" – 2:41
7. "Sugar Mama" – 2:30
8. "Down at the Landing" – 3:10
9. "Louise" – 2:35
10. "Ground Hog Blues" – 2:25
11. "High Priced Woman" – 3:15
12. "Women and Money" – 2:55
- Recorded in Chicago on April 26, 1951 (tracks 3, 5, 6 & 9–11), and in Detroit on April 24, 1952 (tracks 1, 2, 7 & 8) and mid/late 1952 (tracks 4 & 12)

== Personnel ==
- John Lee Hooker – guitar, vocals
- Eddie Kirkland – guitar (tracks 9, 11 & 12)
- Bob Thurman – piano (tracks 4 & 12)
- Eddie Burns – bass (tracks 4 & 12)
- Tom Whitehead – drums (track 12)
