= Irwin Silber =

American journalist

- Born: October 17, 1925; New York City, U.S.
- Died: September 8, 2010 (aged 84); Oakland, California, U.S.
- Occupations: Writer, editor, activist
- Spouse: Barbara Dane (m. 1980)

Irwin Silber (October 17, 1925 – September 8, 2010) was an American communist political activist, editor and publisher. He edited the folk music magazine Sing Out! and was active in far-left politics throughout his life.

== Biography ==
=== Early years ===
Irwin Silber was born in 1925 in New York City to Jewish parents.

As a young man, Silber joined the Young Communist League, the youth section of the Communist Party USA (CPUSA), moving later to membership in the adult party. Silber ultimately severed his ties with the CPUSA in 1955.

Silber attended Brooklyn College, where he was instrumental in establishing the American Folksay Group. Through his involvement with folk music, Silber made the acquaintance of Pete Seeger, Alan Lomax, and others influential in that music scene.

=== Activist and author ===
The co-founder, and former long-time editor of Sing Out! magazine from 1951 to 1967, Silber was perhaps best known for his writing on American folk music and musicians until he left Sing Out! and began writing for the left wing newspaper The Guardian. His creation of Oak Publications was responsible for a large portion of the folk music material available in print during the growth of the revival. On the occasion of his 80th birthday an interview with Mr. Silber was published giving details on his role in the progressive folk music circles of the 40s, 50s and 60s as well as his appearance before the House Un-American Activities Committee in the 1950s.

In 1968, he signed the "Writers and Editors War Tax Protest" pledge, vowing to refuse tax payments in protest against the Vietnam War. After leaving Sing Out! in 1968, Silber became cultural editor of the independent radical newsweekly, The Guardian and also its film critic. He began to write on more directly political subjects, specializing in analysis of both national and international developments and developing a broad and appreciative readership. He became the Guardian's executive editor in 1972 and led it into the milieu of the New Communist Movement. Factional disagreements led to a split within the Guardian staff, and Silber left the newspaper in 1979, moving to California to join the leadership of a current within US Marxism known as the "rectification movement" and he affiliated with the Line of March.

Silber and blues/folk singer/fellow activist Barbara Dane became a couple in 1964. Among other collaborations, they established the independent recording company Paredon Records to distribute and document the music being created by the liberation movements of the 1970s. Dane produced nearly 50 LPs, and Silber handled the promotion and distribution. To insure availability of the material, in the mid-1980s they donated the label to Smithsonian Folkways, which distributes the collection on CD and digitally.

Among Silber's most important political writing is Socialism; What Went Wrong, an examination of the theoretical and practical events in the USSR leading up to its collapse. His only non-political book in the last 20 years is A Patient's Guide to Hip and Knee Replacement based on his own experience with these operations. Silber's most recent book, Press Box Red, tells the story of sports editor Lester Rodney, whose decade-long campaign in the pages of the Daily Worker helped pave the way for the racial integration of major league baseball.

In the December 24, 2007 issue of Newsweek, American writer Garrison Keillor was asked to name his five most important books. His choice for #2 (after the Acts of the Apostles) is The Folksinger's Wordbook by Silber, a huge collection of "hymns, blues, murder ballads, miner's laments-the whole culture."

=== Open letter to Dylan ===
In the November 1964 edition of Sing Out!, Silber wrote an article called "Open Letter to Bob Dylan."

I saw at Newport how you had somehow lost contact with people ... some of the paraphernalia of fame were getting in your way.

Dylan did not like being told how to perform or how to write, and he replied by telling his manager Albert Grossman that his songs were no longer available for publication in Sing Out!.

Eventually, in 1968, Silber retracted his criticism in The Guardian.

"Many of us who did not fully understand the dynamics of the political changes... felt deserted by a poet." "Dylan is our poet – not our leader... Dylan... is communicating where it counts."

The words quoted above are from page 314 of No Direction Home: the Life and Music of Bob Dylan, by Robert Shelton.

In Chronicles Volume One (2004), Bob Dylan commented:

I liked Irwin, but I couldn't relate to it. Miles Davis would be accused of something similar when he made the album Bitches Brew... what I did to break away was to take simple folk changes and put new images and attitudes into them.

== Personal life ==
Silber lived in Oakland with his wife, folk singer Barbara Dane, from 1980 until Silber's death in 2010. Irwin Silber died on September 8, 2010, in Oakland at the age of 84.

== Bibliography ==
- Lift Every Voice, Foreword by Paul Robeson (1953)
- Songs of the Civil War, Columbia University Press (1960), Dover (1995)
- Hootenanny Song Book (with Jerry Silverman), Consolidated Music Publishers (1963)
- Songs of the Great American West, Macmillan (1967), Dover (1995)
- Hard-Hitting Songs for Hard-Hit People, edited and produced by Irwin Silber, compiled by Alan Lomax, foreword by John Steinbeck, notes by Woody Guthrie, music transcription by Pete Seeger; Oak Publications (1967), Univ. Nebraska Press (1999)
- Folksong Festival, Scholastic Book Services (1967)
- Vietnam Songbook (with Barbara Dane), Guardian (1969)
- The Cultural Revolution: A Marxist Analysis, Times Change Press (1970)
- Songs America Voted By, Stackpole (1971)
- Songs of Independence, Stackpole (1973)
- Folksingers Wordbook (with Fred Silber), Music Sales Corporation (1973, reissued 2000)
- Afghanistan – The Battle Line is Drawn, Line of March Publications (1980)
- Kampuchea: The Revolution Rescued, Line of March Publications (1986)
- Socialism: What Went Wrong? – An Inquiry into the Theoretical and Historical Roots of the Socialist Crisis, Pluto Press (1994)
- A Patient's Guide to Knee and Hip Replacement, Simon & Schuster (1999)
- Press Box Red: The Story of Lester Rodney, the Communist Who Helped Break the Color Line in American Sports, Temple University Press (2006); ISBN 1-56639-974-2
