= Live at Sugar Hill =

Live album by John Lee Hooker
- Released: 1963
- Recorded: November 1962
- Venue: Sugar Hill, San Francisco, California
- Genre: Blues
- Length: 37:16
- Label: Galaxy
- Producer: Sol Weiss, Jim Easton

John Lee Hooker chronology
John Lee Hooker on Campus (1963)	Live at Sugar Hill (1963)	Concert at Newport (1964)

Reissue cover
- Boogie Chillun (1974)

Live at Sugar Hill is a live album by blues musician John Lee Hooker recorded in the Sugar Hill club in California in 1962 and released by the Galaxy label. The album was reissued in 1974 by Fantasy as the first disc of the double LP Boogie Chillun which added ten additional previously unreleased recordings from the same concerts.

== Reception ==
Professional ratings
Review scores
Source	Rating
AllMusic	4.5/5 stars
The Penguin Guide to Blues Recordings	3/4 stars

AllMusic reviewer Richie Unterberger stated: "Recorded live in November 1962 in San Francisco, this dates from the period in which Hooker often presented himself as a sort of blues/folk singer for the coffeehouse crowd, toning down his volume and aggressiveness somewhat. There's something of a muted "unplugged" feel to these solo performances (though an electric guitar is used). It's not ineffective, though not among his best work; it's the kind of Hooker you might want to put on past midnight, just before going to sleep".

== Track listing ==
All compositions credited to John Lee Hooker except where noted

1. "I Can't Hold On" – 4:07
2. "I'm Gonna Keep on Walking" – 3:28
3. "I Was Standing by the Wayside" – 4:46
4. "T. B. Is Killing Me" – 4:12
5. "Run On Babe" – 2:17
6. "This World" – 5:27
7. "I Like to See You Walk" – 2:28
8. "It's You I Love, Baby" – 2:31
9. "Driftin' and Driftin'" – 4:02
10. "You Gonna Miss Me" – 3:58
11. "You're Nice and Kind to Me Lou Della" – 5:00 Additional track on Boogie Chillun
12. "I Need Some Money" – 3:10 Additional track on Boogie Chillun
13. "I Want to Get Married" (B.B. King, Joe Josea) – 4:30 Additional track on Boogie Chillun
14. "Matchbox" (Carl Perkins) – 4:05 Additional track on Boogie Chillun
15. "Boogie Chillun" – 2:43 Additional track on Boogie Chillun
16. "Night Time Is the Right Time" (Leroy Carr) — 3:20 Additional track on Boogie Chillun
17. "You Don't Move Me Baby" – 4:15 Additional track on Boogie Chillun
18. "You Been Dealin' with the Devil" – 3:30 Additional track on Boogie Chillun
19. "Cruel Little Baby" – 3:00 Additional track on Boogie Chillun
20. "I Got the Key to the Highway" (Charlie Segar, Big Bill Broonzy) – 3:30 Additional track on Boogie Chillun

== Personnel ==
- John Lee Hooker – guitar, vocals
