= Simply the Truth =

Studio album by John Lee Hooker
- Released: February 1969
- Recorded: New York City, September 17 & 18, 1968
- Genre: Blues
- Length: 37:49
- Label: BluesWay
- Producer: Bob Thiele

John Lee Hooker chronology
Urban Blues (1967)	Simply the Truth (1969)	That's Where It's At! (1969)

Simply the Truth is an album by blues musician John Lee Hooker released by the BluesWay label in February 1969.

== Reception ==
Professional ratings
Review scores
Source	Rating
AllMusic	3/5 stars
The Penguin Guide to Blues Recordings	2.5/4 stars

In his retrospective, AllMusic reviewer Richie Unterberger stated: "Overseen by noted jazz producer Bob Thiele, this session had Hooker backed by some of his fullest arrangements to date ... The slightly modernized sound was ultimately neither here nor there, the center remaining Hooker's voice and lyrics. ... Another of his many characteristically solid efforts, although it's not one of his more interesting albums".

== Track listing ==
All compositions credited to John Lee Hooker

1. "I Don't Wanna Go to Vietnam" – 5:36
2. "Mini Skirts" – 3:28
3. "Mean Mean Woman" – 5:45
4. "I Wanna Bugaloo" – 4:15
5. "Tantalizing with the Blues" – 5:05
6. "(Twist Ain't Nothin') But the Old Time Shimmy" – 3:19
7. "One Room Country Shack" – 4:27
8. "I'm Just a Drifter" – 6:04

== Personnel ==
- John Lee Hooker – guitar, vocals
- Hele Rosenthal – harmonica
- Ernie Hayes – piano, organ
- Wally Richardson – guitar
- William Folwell – bass
- Bernard Purdie – drums
