= Don't Turn Me from Your Door =

Compilation album by John Lee Hooker
- Released: February 1963
- Recorded: Cincinnati, Ohio, July 1953; Miami, Florida, July 1961
- Genre: Blues
- Length: 31:53
- Label: Atco
- Producer: Henry Stone

John Lee Hooker chronology
| The Big Soul of John Lee Hooker (1963) | Don't Turn Me from Your Door (1963) | John Lee Hooker on Campus (1963) |

Don't Turn Me from Your Door, subtitled John Lee Hooker Sings His Blues, is an album by the blues musician John Lee Hooker, compiling six songs originally recorded for De Luxe Records in 1953 along with six new tunes recorded in 1961. Atco Records released the album in 1963.

== Reception ==
Professional ratings
Review scores
| Source | Rating |
|---|---|
| The Encyclopedia of Popular Music | 3/5 stars |
| The Penguin Guide to Blues Recordings | 3/4 stars |

AllMusic reviewer Steve Leggett wrote that "you really can't go wrong with this guy – he always delivered what he was supposed to deliver with no frills and no fuss, generating a kind of endless boogie that, no matter what embellishments producers added in, was always poised between old country blues and its next-generation urban blues counterpart. None of Hooker's signature songs are here, but one still gets a solid sense of him, and truthfully, the only bad Hooker is no Hooker at all."

== Track listing ==
All compositions credited to John Lee Hooker

1. "Stuttering Blues" – 2:13
2. "Wobbling Baby" – 2:32
3. "You Lost a Good Man" – 2:50
4. "Love My Baby" – 2:35
5. "Misbelieving Baby" – 2:30
6. "Drifting Blues" – 3:33
7. "Don't Turn Me from Your Door" – 2:40
8. "My Baby Don't Love Me" – 2:58
9. "I Ain't Got Nobody" – 2:28
10. "Real Real Gone" – 2:22
11. "Guitar Lovin' Man" – 2:38
12. "Talk About Your Baby" – 2:33

Recorded in Cincinnati, Ohio, in July, 1953 (tracks 1, 2, 4, 8, 10 & 11) and Miami, Florida, in July, 1961 (tracks 3, 5–7, 9 & 12)

== Personnel ==
- John Lee Hooker – guitar, vocals
- Eddie Kirkland – guitar (track 2)
- Earl Hooker – guitar (tracks 5 & 9)
