= Darren Thiboutot Jr. =

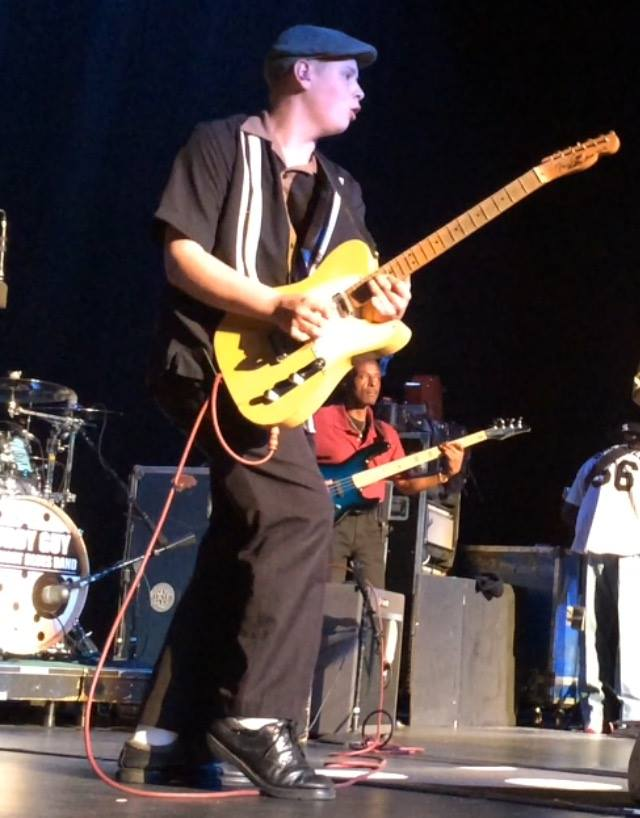
- Lightnin’ performing with Buddy Guy and his band at the Capital Center for the Arts in New Hampshire

Background information
- Also known as: Lightnin’ Thiboutot Jr.
- Born: September 5, 1997 (age 28); Maine, United States
- Genres: Blues; country; rockabilly
- Occupations: Musician, guitarist, singer, songwriter, producer
- Instruments: Guitar, vocals
- Years active: 2009–present
- Website: http://www.memphislightning.com

Darren "Lightnin'" Thiboutot Jr. (born September 5, 1997) is an American guitarist, known for his work with Memphis Lightning. He has also shared the stage and/or recorded with Eddie Kirkland, Jimmie Vaughan, Samantha Fish, Albert Castiglia, Paul Nelson, Brent Mason, Robin Trower, Buddy Guy and many more.

== Early life ==
Thiboutot was born in Maine to his mother Deb, and father Darren "Big Red" Thiboutot. His father was a session and touring blues drummer in the 1990s for Eddie Kirkland, Tab Benoit, and The Hoo Doo Kings, among many others. Thiboutot started playing guitar at the age of eight, learning from teachers, heroes and influences including Eddie Kirkland, Magic Sam, Nokie Edwards, Roy Buchanan, Chuck Berry, and Roy Nichols. He developed his own guitar sound and was known for his use of a guitar straight to an amplifier, without any effects pedals. Thiboutot was diagnosed with cancer at the age of 18 but has been in remission for seven years. Currently he records and tours with his band Memphis Lightning.

== Career ==
Thiboutot began his professional music career and has played with his band Memphis Lightning since he was 12 years old, with his father, Big Red. Memphis Lightning was originally called The Blue Jets and featured Thiboutot on guitar, his father Big Red on drums and Slow Driver on bass. They were also the founding members of Memphis Lightning, and served as the members for 10 years. Thiboutot initially only played guitar in the band, eventually leading to some vocals before becoming the frontman and primary songwriter. His playing style has been compared to Danny Gatton and Roy Buchanan, meeting the crazy stage antics and showmanship of artists such as Mick Jagger and David Bowie. Since starting his career, he has shared the stage with and/or recorded with Eddie Kirkland, Buddy Guy, Luther "Guitar Junior" Johnson, Jimmie Vaughan, Samantha Fish, Tab Benoit, Brent Mason, Paul Nelson, Joanna Connor, Marty Sammon, Big Sandy, Tammi Savoy, Jamiah on Fire and The Red Machine, among others. In 2016, Thiboutot represented the state of Maine in The International Blues Challenge Youth Showcase. In 2019, Thiboutot began touring nationwide with his band Memphis Lightning.

In 2022, Memphis Lightning won best self-produced album at the International Blues Challenge.

== Discography ==
with Memphis Lightning: *2026 -"Personal Obsession"

- 2021 – Borrowed Time
- 2019 – Live and Raw
- 2019 – Come Back Home (live single)
- 2017 – Trouble
