= Folk Blues (album) =

Compilation album by John Lee Hooker
- Released: 1962
- Recorded: August 7, 1951 – November 1954
- Genre: Blues
- Length: 30:08
- Label: Crown
- Producer: Joe Bihari, Joe Siracuse

John Lee Hooker chronology
The Folk Lore of John Lee Hooker (1961)	Folk Blues (1962)	Burnin' (1962)

Professional ratings
Review scores
Source	Rating
AllMusic	3.5/5 stars
The New Rolling Stone Record Guide	3/5 stars

Folk Blues is an album by blues musician John Lee Hooker, compiling tracks originally recorded for Modern Records between 1951 and 1954, that was released by the Crown label in 1962.

== Reception ==
AllMusic reviewer Matt Fink stated: "Folk Blues is a rather average album in Hooker's vast catalog, but still a highly enjoyable piece ... Overall, a very listenable collection."

== Track listing ==
All compositions credited to John Lee Hooker

1. "Baby I'm Gonna Miss You" – 2:33
2. "Half a Stranger" – 4:24
3. "Shake Holler And Run" – 2:31
4. "Down Child" – 2:52
5. "Gonna Boogie" — 2:24
6. "Bad Boy" – 3:05
7. "Rock House Boogie" – 2:54
8. "Let's Talk It Over" – 3:01
9. "Baby You Ain't No Good" – 3:12
10. "Lookin' for a Woman" – 3:12

Recorded on August 7, 1951 (track 8), late 1952 (tracks 7 & 10), late 1953 (tracks 4–6), late 1954 (tracks 1, 2 & 9) and November 1954 (track 3)

== Personnel ==
- John Lee Hooker – guitar, vocals
- Eddie Kirkland – guitar, vocals
