= Mr. Lucky (John Lee Hooker album) =

Studio album by John Lee Hooker
- Released: August 26, 1991
- Recorded: Ocean Way Recording Studios, Hollywood; Plant Recording Studios, Sausalito; Russian Hill Recording, San Francisco
- Genre: Blues
- Length: 46:04
- Labels: Virgin Records (Charisma, PointBlank, Classic) / Silvertone (UK)
- Producers: Ry Cooder, Mike Kappus, Roy Rogers, Carlos Santana

John Lee Hooker chronology
Lonesome Road (1990)	Mr. Lucky (1991)	More Real Folk Blues: The Missing Album (1991)

Professional ratings
Review scores
Source	Rating
AllMusic	3/5 stars
Robert Christgau	A−
Entertainment Weekly	B−
The Penguin Guide to Blues Recordings	3/4 stars
Rolling Stone	4/5 stars

Mr. Lucky is a 1991 album by American blues singer, songwriter and guitarist John Lee Hooker. Produced by Ry Cooder, Roy Rogers and Carlos Santana under the executive production of Mike Kappus, the album features musicians including Keith Richards, Albert Collins, John Hammond, Robert Cray, Blues Hall of Fame inductee Johnny Winter; and three inductees of the Rock and Roll Hall of Fame, Van Morrison, Booker T. Jones and Johnnie Johnson. And also Chester D. Thompson, who once played with Santana, on keyboards, has collaborated on writing a song on the album. Released on Virgin Records, including on its imprint label Classic Records, Mr. Lucky peaked at #101 on the "Billboard 200". Chester D. Thompson should not be mistaken with Chester Cortez Thompson, a drummer who also played with Santana, Frank Zappa and The Mothers of Invention, Weather Report, Genesis and Phil Collins .

== History ==
In 1989, John Lee Hooker achieved commercial and critical success with The Healer, an album which paired him with musicians including Carlos Santana and Bonnie Raitt, with whom Hooker shared a Grammy Award for "Best Traditional Blues Recording" for the track "In the Mood". With Mr. Lucky, producers Cooder, Rogers and Santana follow the same successful formula, to mixed critical reviews; Rolling Stone praised the album as a refinement over its predecessor with an "all around...sharper fit", its notable guests serving as "superb sidemen for a great bluesman". Entertainment Weekly, by contrast, described the album as essentially "a tribute album" where "most of the tunes...don't sound like Hooker at all". In spite of mixed reception, the album charted well, reaching #101 on the "Billboard 200" chart in 1991 and also enjoying international sales success. It was nominated for, but did not win, a Grammy.

== Track listing ==
All songs composed by John Lee Hooker (except where noted).

1. "I Want to Hug You" (Hooker, Al Smith) – 2:52
2. "Mr. Lucky" (Hooker, Smith) – 4:38
3. "Backstabbers" (Hooker, Smith) – 5:01
4. "This Is Hip" – 3:23
5. "I Cover the Waterfront" – 6:39 (Johnny Green, Edward Heyman)
6. "Highway 13" – 6:32
7. "Stripped Me Naked" (Hooker, Benny Rietveld, Carlos Santana, Chester D. Thompson) – 4:18
8. "Susie" – 4:23
9. "Crawlin' King Snake" (Traditional) – 3:20
10. "Father Was a Jockey" – 4:58

== Personnel ==
=== Performance ===
- John Lee Hooker – guitar, vocals
- Van Morrison – guitar, vocals (5)
- Robert Cray – guitar, vocals (2)
- Carlos Santana – guitar (7)
- Johnny Winter – guitar (8)
- Keith Richards – guitar (9)
- Ry Cooder – guitar (4)
- Albert Collins – guitar (3)
- Tim Kaihatsu – guitar (2)
- Michael Osborn – guitar (1)
- John P. Hammond – slide guitar, harmonica (6, 10)
- Richard Cousins – double bass (2)
- Maurice Cridlin – bass guitar (5)
- Steve Ehrmann – bass (1, 6, 10)
- Jeff Ganz – bass (8)
- Jim Guyett – bass (3)
- Nick Lowe – bass (4)
- Benny Rietveld – bass (7)
- Larry Taylor – bass (9)
- Chester D. Thompson – keyboards (7)
- Johnnie Johnson – piano (1, 4)
- Booker T. Jones – organ (5)
- Deacon Jones – organ (3)
- Jimmy Pugh – organ (2)
- Terry Evans – vocals (4)
- William "Bill" Greene – vocals (4)
- Bobby King – vocals (4)
- Kenny Baker – saxophone (3)
- Gaylord Birch – drums (7)
- Jim Keltner – drums (4)
- Scott Mathews – drums (1, 5, 6, 9, 10)
- Bowen Brown – drums (3)
- Tom Compton – drums (8)
- Kevin Hayes – drums (2)
- Karl Perazzo – timbales (7)
- Raul Rekow – conga † (7)

=== Production ===
- Roy Rogers – main producer
- Carlos Santana – producer
- Ry Cooder – producer
- Mike Kappus – executive producer, concept, talent coordinator
- Arne Frager – engineer, mixing
- Samuel Lehmer – engineer, mixing
- Allen Sides – engineer
- Carol Bobolts – design
- Steve Samiof – art direction

== Charts ==
Chart (1991)	Peak position
Australian Albums (ARIA Charts)	22

== Certifications ==
Region	Certification	Certified units/sales
Australia (ARIA)	Gold	35,000^{^}
^{^} Shipments figures based on certification alone.
