= Mezcla =

Cuban music group

Mezcla is a music group from Cuba.

== Mezcla ==
Mezcla has been a part of the Cuban music scene for the past twenty-five years.

Mezcla was featured in the Smithsonian Institution's documentary on Latin Jazz La Combinacion Perfecta.

The band has participated in festivals throughout Europe, Latin America, and the U.S. At the jazz club La Zorra y el Cuervo, they have performed with musicians who are visiting for the Havana Jazz Festival. These musicians include George Benson, Felipe Cabrera, Steve Coleman, Roy Hargrove, Giovanni Hidalgo, Wynton Marsalis, Dafnis Prieto, Orlando Sanchez, Yosvany Terry, and Chucho Valdés.

A review at All About Jazz said that the band's album I'll See You in Cuba combines jazz, blues, soul into a celebration of Cuban song and dance.

== Pablo "Mezcla" Menéndez ==
Born in Oakland, California, guitarist Pablo "Mezcla" Menéndez is the son of blues and jazz singer Barbara Dane. As a resident of Cuba since 1966, he has worked with the Nueva Trova movement (Silvio Rodríguez and Pablo Milanés), the jazz world (Gonzalo Rubalcaba), and Afro-rock group Síntesis (with Carlos and Ele Alfonso). He founded Mezcla in 1989.

When Mezcla's visas were denied in 1993, U.S. public opinion and some members of Congress protested. Among the protesters was guitarist Carlos Santana, who stated in an interview with the San Francisco Examiner that Mezcla was his favorite band from Cuba.

In 1999 he wrote two songs with Bonnie Raitt as part of the Bridge to Havana songwriting workshop. At the end of the week a concert was performed in which Menéndez performed the song "Cuba's Way Too Cool" with Raitt, actor Woody Harrelson, and guitarist Rey Guerra.

In 2005 Menéndez released a solo album, Havana Blues Mambo. He has led a Cuban All Star band at venues in the U.S. In January 2009 he was invited to perform with Larry Coryell and John Stowell at the Jazz Guitar Summit in Olympia, Washington.

== Discography ==
- Somos Hijos De La Mezcla (Egrem)
- Fronteras De Sueños (Intuition)
- Cantos: Lázaro Ros Con Mezcla (Intuition)
- Rocason! (1997)
- Las Puertas Estan Abiertas (1999)
- Akimba! (Khaeon, 2002)
- Havana Blues Mambo (Zoho, 2005)
- I'll See You in CUBA (Zoho, 2010)
- Pure Mezcla (Tilford Productions, 2014)
