= Burnin' (John Lee Hooker album) =

Studio album by John Lee Hooker
- Released: March 1962
- Recorded: Chicago, October 26, 1961
- Genre: Blues
- Length: 31:42
- Label: Vee-Jay
- Producer: Calvin Carter

John Lee Hooker chronology
Folk Blues (1962)	Burnin' (1962)	John Lee Hooker (1962)

Burnin' is an album by the blues musician John Lee Hooker, recorded in Chicago on October 26, 1961 and released on the Vee-Jay label the following year. Hooker is backed by the Funk Brothers. The album includes the nationally charting single "Boom Boom".

== Reception ==
Professional ratings
Review scores
Source	Rating
AllMusic	5/5 stars
The Penguin Guide to Blues Recordings	3/4 stars
The Virgin Encyclopedia of The Blues	4/5 stars

The Penguin Guide to Blues Recordings wrote: "Burnin' is another album cut at a single session but it has more texture and spirit than Travelin'. Hooker presides over 11 tracks of uncomplicated danceable music, pushed by the saxes". AllMusic reviewer Al Campbell stated: "Burnin' was released in 1962 and combines 12 tracks of electric material performed by Hooker backed by a band ... recommended".

== Track listing ==
All compositions credited to John Lee Hooker

1. "Boom Boom" – 2:32
2. "Process" – 3:49
3. "Lost a Good Girl" – 2:51
4. "A New Leaf" – 2:30
5. "Blues Before Sunrise" – 3:49
6. "Let's Make It" – 2:27
7. "I Got a Letter" – 2:44
8. "Thelma" – 3:31
9. "Drug Store Woman" – 2:47
10. "Keep Your Hands to Yourself" – 2:10
11. "What Do You Say" – 2:27

== Personnel ==
=== Performance ===
- John Lee Hooker – guitar, vocals
- Hank Cosby – tenor saxophone
- Andrew "Mike" Terry – baritone saxophone
- Joe Hunter – piano
- Larry Veeder – guitar
- James Jamerson – bass
- Benny Benjamin – drums
