= Live at Cafe Au Go Go =

Live album by John Lee Hooker
- Released: 1967
- Recorded: August 20, 1966
- Venue: Cafe Au Go Go, New York City
- Genre: Blues
- Length: 33:17
- Label: BluesWay
- Producer: Bob Thiele

John Lee Hooker chronology
| The Real Folk Blues (1966) | Live at Cafe Au Go Go (1967) | Urban Blues (1967) |

Live at Cafe Au Go Go is a live album by blues musician John Lee Hooker with members of Muddy Waters Blues Band. It was recorded at the Cafe Au Go Go in New York City and released by BluesWay Records in 1967.

== Reception ==
Professional ratings
Review scores
| Source | Rating |
|---|---|
| AllMusic | 3/5 stars |
| The Penguin Guide to Blues Recordings | 2.5/4 stars |

AllMusic reviewer Richie Unterberger stated: "A decent if somewhat low-key electric set, recorded in August of 1966. One of his better live bands, featuring support from Otis Spann and other members of Muddy Waters' group".

== Track listing ==
All music is composed by John Lee Hooker.

| No. | Title | Length |
|---|---|---|
| 1. | "I'm Bad Like Jesse James" | 5:03 |
| 2. | "She's Long, She's Tall (She Weeps Like a Willow Tree)" | 3:08 |
| 3. | "When My First Wife Left Me" | 3:42 |
| 4. | "Heartaches and Misery" | 5:10 |
| 5. | "One Bourbon, One Scotch and One Beer" | 4:05 |
| 6. | "I Don't Want No Trouble" | 4:09 |
| 7. | "I'll Never Get Out of These Blues Alive" | 4:18 |
| 8. | "Seven Days" | 3:42 |

== Personnel ==
- John Lee Hooker – guitar, vocals
- Otis Spann – piano
- Muddy Waters, Sammy Lawhorn, Luther "Snake Boy" Johnson – guitars
- Mac Arnold – bass
- Francis Clay – drums
