= That's Where It's At! =

Compilation album by John Lee Hooker
- Released: 1969
- Recorded: Miami, Florida, July 1961
- Genre: Blues
- Length: 39:42
- Label: Stax
- Producer: Henry Stone

John Lee Hooker chronology
Simply the Truth (1969)	That's Where It's At! (1969)	If You Miss 'Im...I Got 'Im (1969)

That's Where It's At! is an album by American blues musician John Lee Hooker recorded in 1961 collecting five tracks originally released on a split album by Guest Star Records in 1966 along with five unreleased tracks, that was issued by the Stax label in 1969.

== Reception ==
Professional ratings
Review scores
Source	Rating
The Penguin Guide to Blues Recordings	3/4 stars

AllMusic reviewer Richie Unterberger stated: "A characteristic solo outing with moody compositions and that doomy one-electric-guitar-and-stomping-foot ambience, That's Where It's At! is one of Hooker's sparer and more menacing post-'50s outings".

== Track listing ==
All compositions credited to John Lee Hooker

1. "Teachin' the Blues" – 3:24
2. "Goin' to Louisiana" – 4:40
3. "I Need You" – 2:56
4. "My Love Comes Down for You" – 3:27
5. "Please Don't Go" – 2:47
6. "I Just Don't Know" – 3:46
7. "Slow and Easy" – 3:07
8. "Two White Horses" – 3:55
9. "Feel So Bad" – 7:47 (recorded 1968 with Steve Alaimo)
10. "Grinder Man" – 3:54

== Personnel ==
- John Lee Hooker – guitar, vocals
