= The Cream (album) =

Live album by John Lee Hooker
- Released: October 1978
- Recorded: September 1977
- Venue: The Keystone, Palo Alto, California
- Genre: Blues
- Length: 39:30
- Label: Tomato
- Producer: Kevin Eggers

John Lee Hooker chronology
| Alone (1976) | The Cream (1978) | Sittin' Here Thinkin' (1979) |

The Cream is a live album by blues musician John Lee Hooker recorded in California in 1977 and released by the Tomato label in 1978.

== Reception ==
Professional ratings
Review scores
| Source | Rating |
|---|---|
| AllMusic | 3/5 stars |
| The Penguin Guide to Blues Recordings | 2.5/4 stars |

AllMusic reviewer Alex Henderson stated: "Joined by a full band that includes two other guitarists, John Lee Hooker is passionately rockin' on this live date recorded at The Keystone in Palo Alto, California in 1977. Hooker has always been known for taking quite a few liberties with his material, something that could easily throw some musicians off. Without a doubt, he keeps sidemen on their toes – and he presents even more of a challenge on-stage because there are no second and third takes. But this is a band that, although not in a class with Canned Heat, obviously understands (and even thrives on) his sense of spontaneity, and rises to the occasion ... Hooker doesn't do as much improvising as he did when playing unaccompanied at New York's Hunter College the previous year, but he never ceases to be confidently soulful. Although not quite essential, The Cream is an engaging LP that definitely has a lot going for it".

== Track listing ==
All compositions credited to John Lee Hooker

1. "Hey, Hey" – 5:48
2. "Rock Steady" – 6:53
3. "Tupelo" – 6:27
4. "You Know It Ain't Right" – 4:22
5. "She's Gone" – 5:47
6. "T.B. Sheets" – 7:57
7. "Sugar Mama" – 5:05
8. "One Room Country Shack" – 4:51
9. "Drug Store Woman" – 5:23

== Personnel ==
- John Lee Hooker – lead guitar, vocals
- Pete Karnes – harmonica
- John Garcia – lead guitar
- Ron Thompson – second guitar
- Mike Milwood – bass
- Larry Martin – drums

=== Guest musicians ===
- Charlie Musselwhite – harmonica
- Ken Swank – drums
