= Come See About Me (video) =

Come and See About Me: The Definitive DVD

Video by John Lee Hooker
- Released: April 20, 2004
- Genre: Blues
- Length: 127:00
- Label: Eagle Rock Entertainment

Professional ratings
Review scores
Source	Rating
Allmusic	4.5/5 stars

Come See About Me: The Definitive DVD is a 2004 film featuring concert performances by American blues artist John Lee Hooker. The program was produced by Ravin' Films for Eagle Rock Entertainment and was directed and edited by Bob Sarles and produced by Christina Keating. It is the first video released by his estate and includes video footage from 1960 to 1994 and interviews with Hooker and other musicians. Allmusic called it "a tremendous primer for the novice [and] an extraordinary two-hours-plus of documentary footage for the fans".

== Song list ==
1. Introduction
2. "Baby, Please Don't Go" duo with Van Morrison (1992)
3. "Maudie" with band at Newport Jazz Festival (1960)
4. "Hobo Blues" solo performance (1965)
5. "It Serves Me Right to Suffer" solo (1969)
6. "Crawling King Snake" with Paul Butterfield and Foghat (1978)
7. "The Boogie" with the Coast to Coast Blues Band (1980)
8. "Never Get Out of These Blues Alive" with the Coast to Coast Blues Band (1981)
9. "Worried Life Blues" with Charlie Musselwhite, Mark Naftalin, and band (1981)
10. "Too Many Women" with Ron Thompson & the Resistors (1984)
11. "Boom Boom" with the Mark Naftalin Band (1984)
12. "I'm Bad Like Jesse James" with band (1986)
13. "I'm in the Mood" with Bonnie Raitt and band (1990)
14. "Bottle Up and Go" with John Hammond, Jr. (1991)
15. "Tupelo Blues" solo (1993)
16. "Hobo Blues" duo with Ry Cooder (1990)
17. "The Healer" with Carlos Santana and band (1990)
18. "Boogie Chillen'" with Eric Clapton and The Rolling Stones (1989)
19. "I Need Love So Bad" with band (1994)

== Bonus features ==
- Interview with daughter Zakiya Hooker
- Interview clip with John Lee Hooker
- Discography
