= Chill Out (John Lee Hooker album) =

Studio album by John Lee Hooker
- Released: February 21, 1995
- Venue: 36:37
- Studio: Russian Hill Recording Studios, San Francisco
- Genre: Blues
- Label: Point Blank; Virgin 7243 8 40107 2 0
- Producer: Roy Rogers

John Lee Hooker chronology
Boom Boom (1992)	Chill Out (1995)	Don't Look Back (1997)

Professional ratings
Review scores
Source	Rating
The Penguin Guide to Blues Recordings	2.5/4 stars

Chill Out is a 1995 album by John Lee Hooker featuring Van Morrison, Carlos Santana, Charles Brown, and Booker T. Jones. It was produced by Roy Rogers, Santana and Hooker himself, and executive produced by Mike Kappus. Tracks 1 to 11 were recorded and mixed at Russian Hill Recording, San Francisco and The Plant, Sausalito, California. The album reached No.3 in the US Blues chart and was awarded a W. C. Handy Award for Traditional Blues Album of the Year. Chester D. Thompson who plays keyboards is not to be mistaken with Chester Cortez Thompson who played drums with Phil Collins, Genesis and Weather Report.

== Track listing ==
All songs written by John Lee Hooker except where noted:

1. "Chill Out (Things Gonna Change)" (John Lee Hooker, Carlos Santana, Chester D. Thompson)
2. "Deep Blue Sea"
3. "Kiddio" (Brook Benton, Clyde Otis)
4. "Medley: "Serves Me Right to Suffer" / "Syndicator"
5. "One Bourbon, One Scotch, One Beer" (Rudy Toombs)
6. "Tupelo"
7. "Woman On My Mind"
8. "Annie Mae"
9. "Too Young"
10. "Talkin' the Blues"
11. "If You've Never Been in Love"
12. "We'll Meet Again" (Deacon Jones, G. K. Fowler)

== Personnel ==
- John Lee Hooker - Guitar (2, 4, 5, 6, 8–11), National Steel Guitar (7) vocals (1–12)
- Carlos Santana - Guitar (1)
- Danny Caron - Guitar (3, 8)
- Van Morrison - Guitar, vocals (4)
- Roy Rogers - Guitar, (4), Slide Guitar (10, 11)
- Rich Kirch - Guitar (5)
- Billy Johnson - Guitar (9)
- Bruce Kaphan - Guitar (12)
- Benny Rietveld - Bass (1)
- Ruth Davies - Bass (3, 8)
- Mac Cridlin - Bass (4)
- Jim Guyett - Bass (5, 12)
- Chester D. Thompson - Keyboards (1)
- Charles Brown - Piano (3, 8)
- John Sanders - Piano (12)
- Booker T. Jones - Organ (5)
- Melvyn "Deacon" Jones - Organ (12)
- Gaylord Birch - Drums (1, 3, 8)
- Bowen Brown - Drums (5, 12)
- Scott Mathews - Drums (4)
- Raoul Rekow - Congas (1)
- Karl Perazzo - Timbales (1)

== Chart ==
Chart (1995)	Peak position
Australian Albums (ARIA Charts)	8
