= Jealous (album) =

Studio album by John Lee Hooker
- Released: 1986
- Recorded: 1982
- Studio: Blue Wave Recorders, Vancouver, Canada; Dragon Studio, Redwood City, California
- Genre: Blues
- Length: 37:24
- Label: Pausa
- Producer: John Lee Hooker

John Lee Hooker chronology
Sittin' Here Thinkin' (1979)	Jealous (1986)	The Healer (1989)

Jealous is an album by the blues musician John Lee Hooker. Produced by Hooker, it was recorded in 1982 but was not released until 1986, when it was issued by Pausa Records. The album won a W.C. Handy Awards and was nominated for a Grammy Awards. The album was reissued on CD in 1996 by Pointblank Records.

== Reception ==
Professional ratings
Review scores
Source	Rating
AllMusic	2.5/5 stars
The Penguin Guide to Blues Recordings	2.5/4 stars
PopMatters	4/10 stars

AllMusic reviewer Thom Owens stated: "While Jealous is propelled by the scarily spare stomp of Hook's guitar, it has few standout moments. Instead, it is a consistent record, with few highs or lows – it's a standard contemporary blues album, without many peaks or valleys. Jealous may be a grittier record than its successor, The Healer, but it tends to fade into the background, making it one of his more undistinguished albums".

PopMatters' Zeth Lundy wrote: "Jealous was recorded with Hooker's touring band at the time, but any sparks of chemistry are doused by the thin, lifeless sound of synthetically-rendered instrumentation ... the recordings themselves are devoid of warmth and pulse, or even the gritty realism of his earlier, seminal work. Here, things are polished to a sheen that's not so much nauseating as it is dull".

== Track listing ==
All compositions credited to John Lee Hooker except where noted.

1. "Jealous" – 3:28
2. "Ninety Days" – 3:24
3. "Early One Morning" – 4:02
4. "When My First Wife Left Me" – 4:31
5. "Boogie Woman" – 4:27
6. "Well Well" – 4:47
7. "I Didn't Know" (Chester Burnett) – 3:00
8. "We'll Meet Again" (Deacon Jones, Gregory Fowler) – 3:58
9. "Worried Life Blues" (Maceo Merriweather) – 2:27
10. "Ninety Days (Reprise)" – 3:20

== Personnel ==
- John Lee Hooker – guitar, vocals
- Mike Osborn (tracks 1–7, 9 & 10), Bruce Kaphan (track 8), Jamie Bowers (track 2) – guitar
- Deacon Jones – Hammond organ
- Robbie King – keyboards (track 2)
- Larry Hamilton (tracks 1–7, 9 & 10), Jim Guyett (track 8) – bass
- Tim Richards (tracks 1–7, 9 & 10), Bowen Brown (track 8) – drums
- Alison Hogan – backing vocals (track 2)
- Ian Berry – horn arrangement (track 1)
