= Eddie Kirkland =

American electric blues musician (1923–2011)

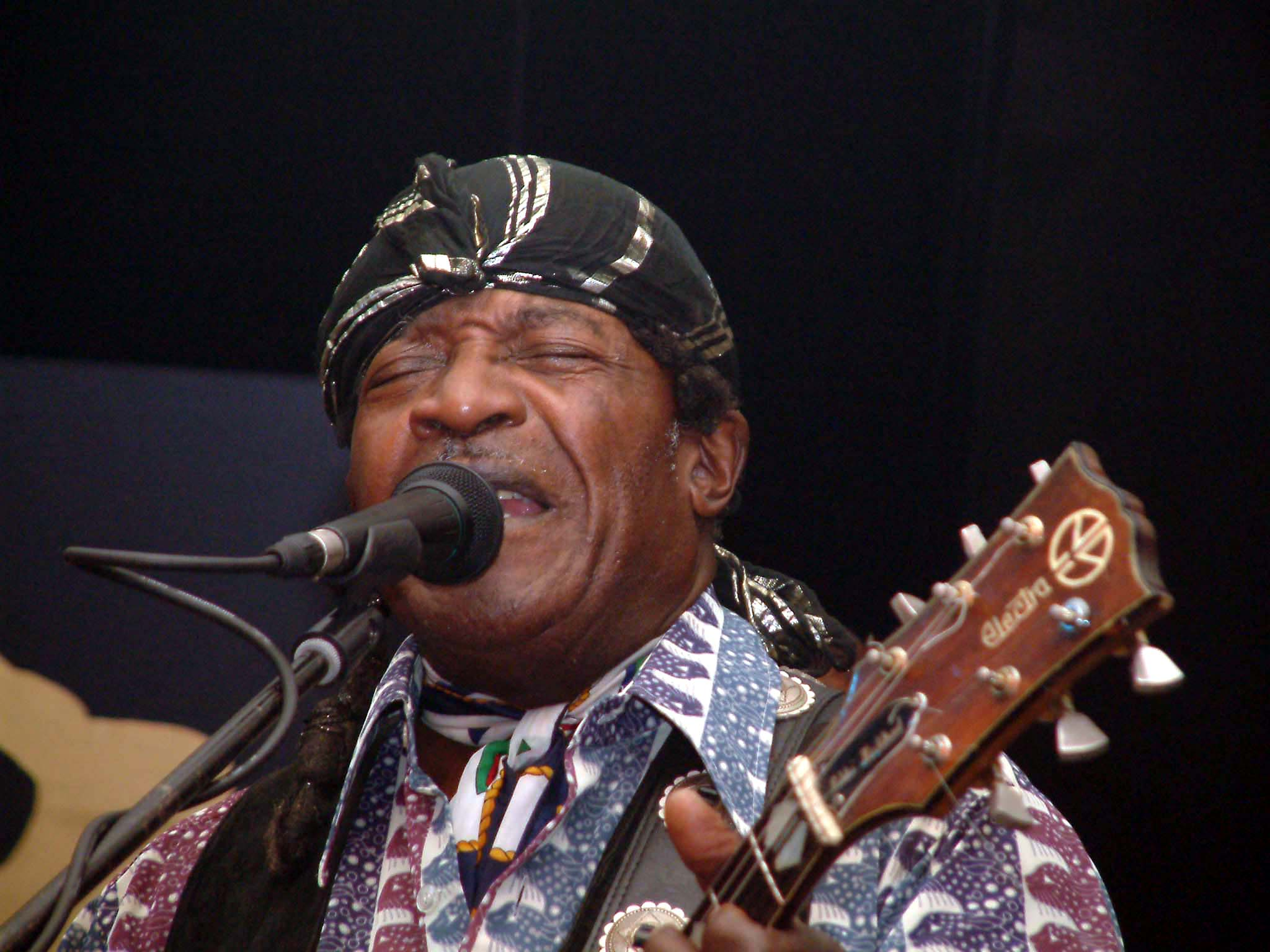
- Kirkland performing in 2002

Background information
- Also known as: Eddie Kirk
- Born: August 16, 1923; Kingston, Jamaica
- Died: February 27, 2011 (aged 87) Crystal River, Florida, U.S.
- Genres: Blues, soul
- Occupations: Musician, singer, songwriter
- Years active: 1949–2011
- Labels: RPM Records, Fortune Records, Volt Records, and King Records

Eddie Kirkland (August 16, 1923 – February 27, 2011) was an American electric blues guitarist, harmonicist, singer, and songwriter.

Kirkland, known as the "Gypsy of the Blues" for his rigorous touring schedules, played and toured with John Lee Hooker from 1949 to 1962. After his period of working in tandem with Hooker he pursued a successful solo career, recording for RPM Records, Fortune Records, Volt Records, and King Records, sometimes under the stage name Eddie Kirk. Kirkland continued to tour, write and record albums until his death in February 2011. His last performance, the night before his death, was at Dunedin Brewery, Florida.

== Biography ==
Kirkland was born in Kingston, Jamaica to a mother, aged 11 (Kirkland was raised believing his mother was his sister and he was in his early twenties when the truth was revealed to him by his mother), and first heard the blues from "field hollers", and raised in Dothan, Alabama until 1935, when he stowed away in the Sugar Girls Medicine Show tent truck and left town. Blind Blake influenced him the most in those early days. He was placed on the chorus line with "Diamond Tooth Mary" McLean. When the show closed a year later, he was in Dunkirk, Indiana, where he briefly returned to school.

He joined the United States Army during World War II. Racism in the military, he said, led him to seek out the devil. After his discharge, Kirkland traveled to Detroit, where his mother had relocated. After a day's work at the Ford Rouge Center, Kirkland played his guitar at house parties, where he met John Lee Hooker. Kirkland was a frequent second guitarist in recordings from 1949 to 1962. "It was difficult playin' behind Hooker but I had a good ear and was able to move in behind him on anything he did."

Kirkland fashioned his own style of playing open chords, and transformed the rough, porch-style delta blues into the electric age by using his thumb, rather than a guitar pick. He secured his own series of recordings with Sid Nathan of King Records in 1953, at Fortune Records in 1958 and, by 1961, on his own album It's the Blues Man, with the King Curtis Band for Prestige Records.

He wrote and recorded "I Must Have Done Somebody Wrong" for Fortune in 1959. As "Done Somebody Wrong", it was substantially appropriated without credit by Elmore James in 1960, and is most well known for a 1971 interpretation by The Allman Brothers Band. Kirkland remained aggrieved about the matter, saying in 1984, "[I wrote] 'Must Have Done Somebody Wrong,' which Elmore James stole from me and the Allman Brothers performed."

Kirkland became Hooker's road manager and the two traveled from Detroit to the Deep South on many tours, the last in 1962, when Hooker abandoned Kirkland to go overseas. Kirkland found his way to Macon, Georgia and began performing with Otis Redding as his guitarist and band leader. As Eddie Kirk, he released "The Hawg" as a single on Volt Records in 1963. The record was overshadowed by Rufus Thomas's recordings, and Kirkland, discouraged by the music industry and his own lack of education to change the situation, turned to his other skill and sought work as an auto mechanic to earn a living for his growing family.

In 1970, one of the revivals of the blues was taking place. Peter B. Lowry found Kirkland in Macon and convinced him to record again. His first sessions were done in a motel room, resulting in the acoustic, solo LP Front and Center; his second was a studio-recorded band album, The Devil and Other Blues Demons. Both were released on Lowry's Trix Records label. During the mid-1970s, Kirkland befriended the British blues-rock band Foghat. Kirkland remained with Lowry and Trix, and was based in the Hudson Valley for twelve years. During this period, Kirkland appeared on Don Kirshner's Rock Concert with Muddy Waters, Honeyboy Edwards, and Foghat. "Eddie's thumb pick and fingers style give him freedom to play powerful chord riffs rich in rhythms and harmonic tension. He plays like a funky pianist, simultaneously covering bass lines, chord kick, and counterpoint."

In 1973, Kirkland performed at the Ann Arbor Blues and Jazz Festival. John Sinclair decided that they should salute Detroit blues musicians and had them play on the Saturday afternoon; these included Bobo Jenkins, Baby Boy Warren, One String Sam, Little Junior Cannaday, and Boogie Woogie Red.

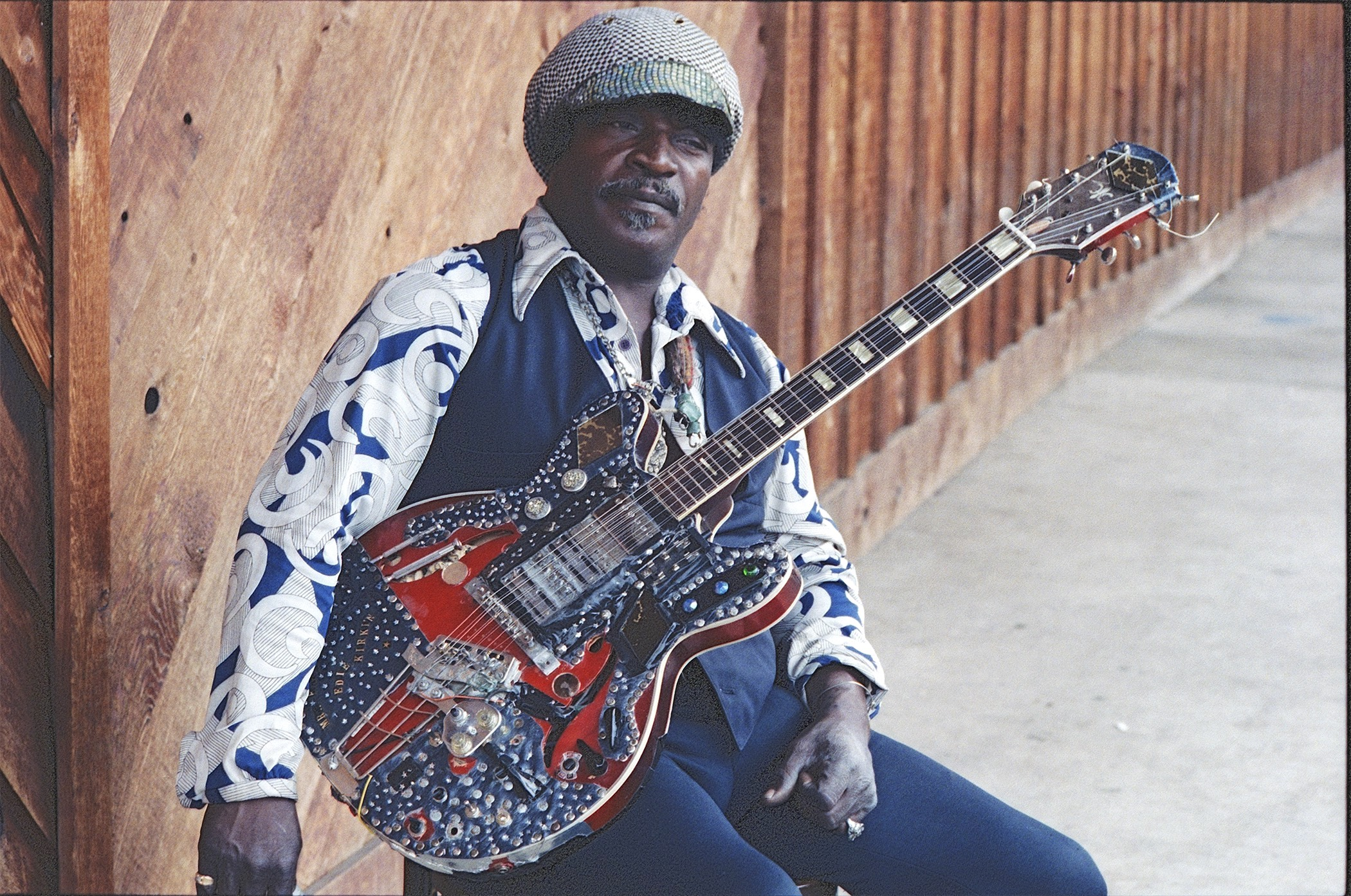
Eddie Kirkland, Atlanta, 1984

The 1990s brought Randy Labbe as manager and booking agent; his own record label, Deluge, recorded Kirkland. Three albums were produced during this Maine period, which included Gregg Hoover on guitar, James Thacker on bass, and Darren Thiboutot on drums. One album was live, one had a guest appearance from Hooker and one contained a duet with Christine Ohlman. Darren Thiboutot Jr., son of Darren Thiboutot, sat in with the band at The Venue in Portland, Maine. By 2000, Kirkland was on his own again, always doing his own driving to concerts in his Ford Country Squire, crossing the country several times a year. He was labeled the Road Warrior, "A thickset, powerful man in the waistcoat and pants of a pin strip[e] suit; red shirt, medallion, shades and a black leather cap over a bandanna, his heavy leather overcoat slung over his arm,.... he's already a Road Warrior par excellence."

Kirkland contributed two songs to longtime friends Foghat's album Last Train Home in 2010.

Well into his eighties, Kirkland continued to drive himself to gigs along the coast and in Europe, frequently playing with the Wentus Blues Band from Finland.

A documentary short entitled Pick Up the Pieces was made about a year in Kirkland's life (2010).

== Death ==
Kirkland's last performance, the night before his death, was at Dunedin Brewery.

He died in a car accident on February 27, 2011, in Crystal River, Florida. At approximately 8:30 a.m. a bus hit Kirkland's car, a 1998 Ford Taurus wagon. Reportedly Kirkland attempted to make a U-turn on U.S. 98 and Oak Park Boulevard, putting him directly in the path of a Greyhound bus. The bus struck the vehicle on the right side and pushed it approximately 200 feet from the point of impact. Kirkland suffered serious injuries and was transported by helicopter to Tampa General Hospital, where he died a short time later. The bus driver and 13 passengers on the bus were not hurt.

In 2015 the Killer Blues Headstone Project placed a headstone for Eddie Kirkland at Cherry Blossom Cemetery in Lizella, Georgia.

== Family ==
Eddie Kirkland is the great-grandfather of TV personality Elie Kirkland and grandfather of Eddie Kirkland Jr., Nancy Pleas, Tiren Pleas Jr. and Tirese Pleas. Kirkland was survived by his wife, Mary, and nine children. He was predeceased by one child, Betty, and his first wife, Ida.

== Discography ==
=== Singles ===
Year	Title	Record label	Credited to
1952	"It's Time for Lovin' to be Done"	RPM Records	Little Eddie Kirkland
1953	"Please Don't Think I'm Nosey"	King Records	
1953	"No Shoes"	King Records	
1959	"I Need You Baby"/"I Must Have Done Somebody Wrong"	Fortune Records	
1961	"Train Done Gone"	Lu Pine Records	
1963	"Them Bones"	Volt Records	Eddie Kirk
1963	"The Hawg"	Volt Records	Eddie Kirk
1964	"Let Me Walk With You"	King Records	
1964	"Monkey Tonight"	King Records	
1964	"Hog Killin' Time"	King Records	
1964	"Have Mercy on Me"	Prestige Records	Eddie 'Bluesman' Kirkland
1964	"Every Hour, Every Minute"	Hi Q Records	
1970	"Lonesome Talkin' Blues"	Trix Records	
1983	"Disco Mary"	Sunland Records	Eddie 'Bluesman' Kirkland

=== Albums ===
Year	Title	Record label	Notes
1962	It's the Blues Man!	Tru-Sound Records	
1965	Dem Bones	Volt Records	
1965	I Found a New Love	Volt Records	
1972	Front and Center	Trix Records	
1974	The Devil and Other Blues Demons	Trix Records	
1981	Pick Up The Pieces	JSP Records	
1988	Have Mercy	Pulsar Records	Reissued by Evidence Records
1992	All Around the World	Deluge Records	
1993	Some Like It Raw	Deluge Records	
1995	Where You Get Your Sugar?	Deluge Records	
1997	Lonely Street	Telarc Records	
1999	Movin' On	JSP Records	with the Nutmeg Horns
1998	Hastings Street Grease, Vol 1	Blue Suit Records	
1999	The Complete Trix Recordings	32 Records	
1999	Hastings Street Grease, Vol 2	Blue Suit Records	
2004	Democrat Blues	Blue Suit Records	
2005	Way It Was	Red Lightnin' Records	
2006	Booty Blues	Hedda Records	
2010	Last Train Home	Foghat Records	with Foghat
2017	Long Gone Gypsy	Backyard Records	

With John Lee Hooker

- House of the Blues (Chess, 1951–52, [1959])
- John Lee Hooker Plays & Sings the Blues (Chess, 1961, [1961])
- Don't Turn Me from Your Door (Atco, 1953, [1963])
- Folk Blues (Crown, 1951–54, [1962])
- Goin' Down Highway 51 (Specialty, 1948–51, [1971])
