= Don't Look Back (John Lee Hooker album) =

Studio album by John Lee Hooker
- Released: March 4, 1997
- Studio: Plant Recording, Sausalito, California; Sunset Sound Factory, Hollywood, California
- Genre: Blues
- Length: 53:33
- Label: Virgin
- Producer: Van Morrison

John Lee Hooker chronology
Chill Out (1995)	Don't Look Back (1997)	The Best of Friends (1998)

Professional ratings
Review scores
Source	Rating
AllMusic	3/5 stars
The Penguin Guide to Blues Recordings	2.5/4 stars

Don't Look Back is an album released by blues singer-songwriter John Lee Hooker in 1997. It was produced by Van Morrison, who also performed duets with Hooker on four of the tracks. The album was the Grammy winner in the Best Traditional Blues Album category in 1998. The title duet by Hooker and Morrison also won a Grammy for Best Pop Collaboration with Vocals.

== John Lee Hooker and Van Morrison ==
Over the years prior to the release of this album, the two singers had collaborated on multiple occasions and had developed a personal friendship. Van Morrison originally recorded the track "Don't Look Back" on his debut album as the frontman for the Northern Irish band Them and according to one of the band members, Billy Harrison, the two first met in London in 1964. Their first collaboration was on Hooker's album Never Get Out of These Blues Alive, recorded in 1972, with a duet on the title song and Hooker's cover of Morrison's "T.B. Sheets". They guested on each other's albums over the years with Hooker also appearing on two films with Morrison: BBC's One Irish Rover and Morrison's 1990 video Van Morrison The Concert.

== Track listing ==
1. "Dimples" (James Bracken, Hooker) – 3:59 L*
2. "The Healing Game" (Van Morrison) – 5:09 M*
3. "Ain't No Big Thing" (Hooker) – 5:19
4. "Don't Look Back" (Hooker) – 6:41 M*
5. "Blues Before Sunrise" (Leroy Carr, Hooker) – 6:41
6. "Spellbound" (Hooker, Michael Osborn) – 3:56
7. "Travellin' Blues" (Hooker) – 5:35 M*
8. "I Love You Honey" (Hooker, Freddy Williams) – 3:31
9. "Frisco Blues" (Hooker) – 3:47
10. "Red House" (Jimi Hendrix) – 4:02
11. "Rainy Day" (Hooker) – 5:50 M*

Notes

- L – with Los Lobos band and also produced by Los Lobos with Mario Caldato Jr.
- M – Duets with Van Morrison

== Chart ==
Chart (1997)	Peak position
Australian Albums (ARIA Charts)	17

== Personnel ==
- John Lee Hooker – vocals, guitar
- Van Morrison – vocals, guitar, producer
- David Hidalgo – guitar
- César Rosas – guitar
- Danny Caron – guitar
- Ruth Davies – double bass
- Conrad Lozano – bass guitar
- Richard Cousins – bass guitar
- John Allair – keyboards
- Jim Pugh – keyboards
- Charles Brown – keyboards
- Roger Lewis – saxophone
- Steve Berlin – baritone saxophone
- Gregory Davis – trumpet
- John "Juke" Logan – harmonica
- Victor Bisetti – drums
- Kevin Hayes – drums
- Mike Kappus – executive producer
