= John Lee Hooker on Campus =

Studio album by John Lee Hooker
- Released: 1964
- Recorded: Chicago, 1963
- Genre: Blues
- Length: 35:02
- Label: Vee-Jay

John Lee Hooker chronology
| Don't Turn Me from Your Door (1963) | John Lee Hooker on Campus (1964) | Live at Sugar Hill (1963) |

John Lee Hooker on Campus is an album by blues musician John Lee Hooker, released by the Vee-Jay label in 1963.

== Reception ==
Professional ratings
Review scores
| Source | Rating |
|---|---|
| AllMusic | 3/5 stars |
| (The New) Rolling Stone Album Guide | 3.5/5 stars |
| The Virgin Encyclopedia of The Blues | 3/5 stars |

AllMusic reviewer Al Campbell wrote: "John Lee Hooker on Campus is titled to sound like a live recording but it isn't ... these 12 tracks originally tried to capitalize on Hooker's emergence on the coffeehouse/college tours he was involved in at the time. This is an electric album that contains excellent material from Hooker, even though the occasional background singers get in the way, attempting to modernize his gritty blues with a smoother soul sound."

== Track listing ==
Album details are taken from the original VeeJay album liner notes. All compositions credited to John Lee Hooker; no other recording information is listed.

Side one

1. "I'm Leaving" – 2:07
2. "Love Is a Burning Thing" – 2:56
3. "Birmingham Blues" – 2:50
4. "I Want to Shout" – 2:28
5. "Don't Look Back" – 2:54
6. "I Want to Hug You" – 2:17

Side two

1. "Poor Me" – 3:21
2. "I Want to Ramble" – 2:37
3. "Half a Stranger" – 2:42
4. "My Grinding Mill" – 2:22
5. "Bottle Up and Go" – 2:10
6. "One Way Ticket" – 2:39
