= The Country Blues of John Lee Hooker =

Studio album by John Lee Hooker
- Released: January 1960
- Recorded: April 20, 1959
- Studio: United Sound Systems, Detroit, Michigan
- Genre: Blues
- Length: 43:00
- Label: Riverside
- Producer: Bill Grauer

The Country Blues of John Lee Hooker (also known as The Folk Blues of John Lee Hooker) is an album by blues musician John Lee Hooker, recorded in Detroit in 1959 and released by Riverside Records in January 1960.

== Reception ==
Professional ratings
Review scores
Source	Rating
AllMusic	3/5 stars
DownBeat	4/5 stars
The Penguin Guide to Blues Recordings	2.5/4 stars
The Virgin Encyclopedia of the Blues	4/5 stars

The Penguin Guide to Blues Recordings said, "Riverside required Hooker to play only acoustic guitar. What motivated this redirection, and in particular the 'classic blues' repertoire on the first album was a view of the blues - you might say a politics of the blues - very much of its time ... though, as always with Hooker the result is not exact commemoration so much as highly personalised allusion".

AllMusic reviewer Richie Unterberger stated: "John Lee Hooker was still churning out R&B-influenced electric blues with a rhythm section for Vee Jay when he recorded The Country Blues of John Lee Hooker, his first album packaged for the folk/traditional blues market. He plays nothing but acoustic guitar, and seems to have selected a repertoire with old-school country-blues in mind. It's unimpressive only within the context of Hooker's body of work; in comparison with other solo outings, the guitar sounds thin, and the approach restrained".

== Track listing ==
All compositions credited to John Lee Hooker except where noted

1. "Black Snake" (Blind Lemon Jefferson) – 3:33
2. "How Long Blues" (Leroy Carr) – 2:14
3. "Wobblin' Baby" – 2:51
4. "She's Long, She's Tall, She Weeps Like a Willow" – 2:47
5. "Pea Vine Special" (Charlie Patton) – 3:10
6. "Tupelo Blues" – 3:23
7. "I'm Prison Bound" (Carr) – 3:58
8. "I Rowed a Little Boat" – 3:28
9. "Water Boy" – 3:00
10. "Church Bell Tone" – 3:43
11. "Bundle Up and Go" – 2:13
12. "Good Morning Lil' School Girl" (Sonny Boy Williamson I) – 3:38
13. "Behind the Plow" – 4:22

== Personnel ==
- John Lee Hooker – guitar, vocals
