= The Real Folk Blues (John Lee Hooker album) =

Studio album by John Lee Hooker
- Released: 1966
- Recorded: Chicago, May 1966
- Genre: Blues, Chicago Blues
- Length: 33:37
- Label: Chess
- Producer: Ralph Bass

John Lee Hooker chronology
It Serve You Right to Suffer (1966)	The Real Folk Blues (1966)	Live at Cafe Au Go Go (1967)

The Real Folk Blues is an album by blues musician John Lee Hooker that was recorded in Chicago in 1966 and released by the Chess label. Additional tracks from the sessions were released as More Real Folk Blues: The Missing Album in 1991.

== Reception ==
Professional ratings
Review scores
Source	Rating
AllMusic	4/5 stars
The Encyclopedia of Popular Music	5/5 stars
The Penguin Guide to Blues Recordings	2.5/4 stars
The Rolling Stone Album Guide	4/5 stars
Select	4/5 medals

AllMusic reviewer Stephen Cook stated: "Listeners wanting to find a comprehensive collection of Hooker's work may not find it here, but they certainly won't be disappointed once the needle hits the grooves on this solid 1966 Chess release by the blues master. Featuring nine Hooker originals, the set is a fetching mix of raucously fun up-tempo cuts and starkly slow classics."

== Track listing ==
All compositions credited to John Lee Hooker

1. "Let's Go Out Tonight" – 7:05
2. "Peace Lovin' Man" – 3:48
3. "Stella Mae" – 2:59
4. "I Put My Trust in You" – 5:15
5. "I'm in the Mood" – 2:41
6. "You Know, I Know" – 3:46
7. "I'll Never Trust Your Love Again" – 3:20
8. "One Bourbon, One Scotch, One Beer" – 2:58
9. "The Waterfront" – 5:25

== Personnel ==
- John Lee Hooker – guitar, vocals
- Lafayette Leake – piano, organ
- Eddie Burns – guitar (tracks 1–8)
- Other unidentified musicians – bass, tambourine
- S.P. Leary or possibly Fred Below – drums
