= The Healer (John Lee Hooker album) =

Studio album by John Lee Hooker
- Released: September 1989
- Studios: Russian Hill Recording Studios, San Francisco, California (most tracks); The Plant, Sausalito, California ("The Healer"); Leon Haywood Studios, Los Angeles, California ("Think Twice Before You Go")
- Genre: Blues
- Length: 41:43
- Label: Chameleon
- Producer: Roy Rogers

John Lee Hooker chronology
Jealous (1986)	The Healer (1989)	Lonesome Road (1990)

The Healer is a blues album by John Lee Hooker, released in 1989 by Chameleon. The album features collaborations with Bonnie Raitt, Charlie Musselwhite, Los Lobos and Carlos Santana, among others. The album was a critical and commercial success and was important for Hooker's later career.

== Background ==
The Healer peaked at number 62 on the Billboard 200 and "I'm in the Mood" won the Grammy Award for Best Traditional Blues Performance. The album was produced by Roy Rogers of the Delta Rhythm Kings, and executive produced by Mike Kappus, who conceived the idea for the project pairing Hooker with a variety of guest musicians.

The video for "The Healer" featuring Carlos Santana and John Lee Hooker was filmed in the Chameleon warehouse in Hawthorne, CA amidst stacks of Hooker's old vinyl LPs, and live on stage at "The Palace," a Hollywood nightclub across from Capitol Records on Vine St. A video for "In the Mood" that featured footage of Bonnie Raitt was in rotation at MTV and VH-1, along with a video that Robert Cray appeared in for "Baby Lee".

John Lee Hooker was 73 years old when the album was released. It was his first Grammy win and was the album that had placed highest on the Billboard charts in his forty-year career. The album had such success that it "permitted John Lee Hooker to live out the end of his life in comfort". Label owner Stephen Powers recounts with joy sending a large royalty check to Hooker, and the deep gratitude he felt for the opportunity to help him to finally achieve the recognition he deserved.

== Reception ==
Professional ratings
Review scores
Source	Rating
AllMusic	2/5 stars
The Encyclopedia of Popular Music	5/5 stars
The Penguin Guide to Blues Recordings	3.5/4 stars
Rolling Stone	4/5 stars
The Village Voice	B+

In a 2023 overview of Hooker's life and career, Tony Russell of Mojo considers this new recording of "In the Mood" a key song in Hooker's catalogue, calling it a "steamily erotic dialogue" with guest artist Bonnie Raitt. It was voted number 424 in the third edition of Colin Larkin's All Time Top 1000 Albums (2000).

== Track listing ==
All tracks are written by John Lee Hooker, except where noted.

The Healer track listing
No.	Title	Writer(s)	Guest musician(s)	Length
1.	"The Healer"	Hooker, Roy Rogers, Carlos Santana, Chester D. Thompson	Carlos Santana and the Santana Band	5:36
2.	"I'm in the Mood"	Hooker, Bernard Besman	Bonnie Raitt	4:30
3.	"Baby Lee"	Hooker, James Bracken	Robert Cray	3:43
4.	"Cuttin' Out"		Canned Heat	4:35
5.	"Think Twice Before You Go"		Los Lobos	2:58
6.	"Sally Mae"	Hooker, Bracken	George Thorogood	3:15
7.	"That's Alright"		Charlie Musselwhite	4:23
8.	"Rockin' Chair"			4:09
9.	"My Dream"			4:02
10.	"No Substitute"			4:07
Total length:				41:18

== Personnel ==
Credits adapted from the album liner notes:

- John Lee Hooker – vocals, guitar, steel guitar
- Jose Areas – timbales
- Steve Berlin – saxophone
- Leon "Ndugu" Chancler – drums
- Richard Cousins – bass guitar
- Robert Cray – guitar
- Steve Ehrmann – bass guitar
- Jim Gaines – engineering and co-production on "The Healer"
- David Hidalgo – guitar, accordion
- Sam Lehmer – engineering on all tracks except "The Healer" and "Think Twice Before You Go", mixing
- Scott Mathews – drums
- Charlie Musselwhite – harmonica
- Mike Kappus – executive producer
- Conrad Lozano – bass guitar
- Mark Lynelle – engineering on "Think Twice Before You Go"
- Adolfo de la Parra – drums
- Armando Peraza – congas
- Louie Pérez – drums
- Bonnie Raitt – vocals, slide guitar
- Roy Rogers – guitar, slide guitar, production
- Cesar Rosas – guitar
- Carlos Santana – guitar and co-production on "The Healer"
- Larry Taylor – bass guitar
- Chester D. Thompson – keyboards
- George Thorogood – guitar
- Henry Vestine – guitar

== Charts ==
=== Weekly charts ===
Chart (1990)	Peak position
Australian Albums (ARIA Charts)	17

=== Year-end charts ===
Chart (1990)	Rank
Australian Albums (ARIA Charts)	78

== Certifications ==
Certifications for The Healer
Region	Certification	Certified units/sales
Australia (ARIA)	Gold	35,000^{^}
Netherlands (NVPI)	Gold	50,000^{^}
^{^} Shipments figures based on certification alone.
