= Urban Blues (John Lee Hooker album) =

Studio album by John Lee Hooker
- Released: 1967
- Genre: Blues
- Label: BluesWay
- Producer: Al Smith

John Lee Hooker chronology
Live at Cafe Au Go Go (1967)	Urban Blues (1967)	On The Waterfront (1968)

Professional ratings
Review scores
Source	Rating
AllMusic	3/5 stars
The Penguin Guide to Blues Recordings	2.5/4 stars

Urban Blues is the fourth recording by John Lee Hooker under the ABC recording years. It was released in 1967 under the ABC-Bluesway record label, and re-released in 1993 under MCA records with two bonus tracks and a different song order.

== Track listing ==
No.	Title	Writer(s)	Length
1.	"Cry Before I Go"	John Lee Hooker, Al Smith	2:40
2.	"Boom Boom"	John Lee Hooker	2:44
3.	"Back Biters and Syndicators"	John Lee Hooker, Al Smith	2:52
4.	"Mr. Lucky"	John Lee Hooker, Al Smith	2:55
5.	"My Own Blues"	James Burke Oden, Al Smith	2:35
6.	"I Can't Stand to Leave You"	Al Smith	2:34
7.	"Think Twice Before You Go"	Al Smith	2:05
8.	"I'm Standing in Line"	Al Smith	2:24
9.	"Hot Spring Water, Pt. 1"	James Burke Oden, Al Smith	2:33
10.	"Hot Spring Water, Pt. 2"	James Burke Oden, Al Smith	2:02
11.	"The Motor City Is Burning"	Al Smith	2:53
12.	"Want Ad Blues"	John Lee Hooker	2:19

== Personnel ==
- John Lee Hooker – guitar, vocals
- Eddie Taylor – guitar
- Phil Upchurch – bass guitar
- Al Duncan – drums
- Louis Myers – harmonica

Technical

- Al Smith – audio production
- Margaret Glogowski – cover design
- Henry Epstein – cover design
- Sheldon Harris – liner notes
- Mel Cheren – cover painting
