= John Lee Hooker =

American blues musician (1912 or 1917–2001)

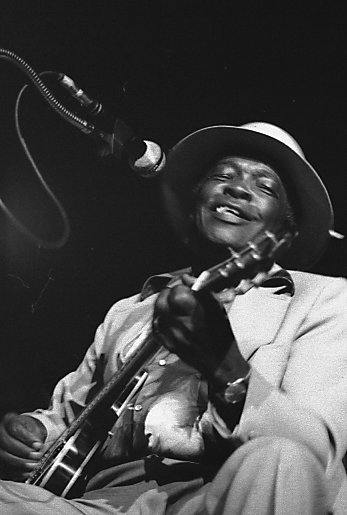
- Hooker at Massey Hall, Toronto, 1978

Background information
- Born: August 22, 1912 or 1917; Tutwiler, Mississippi, or near Clarksdale, Mississippi, U.S.
- Died: June 21, 2001 (aged either 83 or 88) Los Altos, California, U.S.
- Genres: Blues
- Occupations: Singer; songwriter; musician
- Instruments: Guitar; vocals
- Years active: 1930s–2001
- Labels: Modern; Vee-Jay; Chess; Savoy; Atlantic; Verve; Bluesway; Atco; King; Specialty; Impulse!; Pointblank; Chameleon; Fortune; Brylen
- Website: johnleehooker.com

John Lee Hooker (August 22, 1912 or 1917 – June 21, 2001) was an American blues singer, songwriter, and guitarist. The son of a sharecropper, he rose to prominence performing an electric guitar-style adaptation of Delta blues that he developed in Detroit. Hooker often incorporated other elements, including talking blues and early North Mississippi hill country blues. He developed his own driving-rhythm boogie style, distinct from the 1930s–1940s piano-derived boogie-woogie. Hooker was ranked 35 in Rolling Stone's 2015 list of 100 greatest guitarists, and has been cited as one of the greatest male blues vocalists of all time.

Some of his best known songs include "Boogie Chillen'" (1948), "Crawling King Snake" (1949), "Dimples" (1956), "Boom Boom" (1962), and "One Bourbon, One Scotch, One Beer" (1966). Several of his later albums, including The Healer (1989), Mr. Lucky (1991), Chill Out (1995), and Don't Look Back (1997), were album chart successes in the U.S. and UK. The Healer (for the song "I'm in the Mood") and Chill Out (for the album) both earned him Grammy wins, as well as Don't Look Back, which went on to earn him a double-Grammy win for Best Traditional Blues Recording and Best Pop Collaboration with Vocals (with Van Morrison).

== Early life ==
Hooker's date of birth is a subject of debate; the years 1912, 1915, 1917, 1920, and 1923 have all been suggested. Most official sources list 1917, though at times Hooker stated he was born in 1920. Information found in the 1920 and 1930 censuses indicates that he was actually born in 1912. In 2017, a series of events was held to celebrate the supposed centenary of his birth. In the 1920 federal census, John Hooker is seven years old and one of nine children living with William and Minnie Hooker in Tutwiler, Mississippi.

It is believed that he was born in Tutwiler, in Tallahatchie County, although some sources say his birthplace was near Clarksdale, in Coahoma County. He was the youngest of the 11 children of William Hooker (born 1871, died after 1923), a sharecropper and Baptist preacher, and Minnie Ramsey (born c. 1880, date of death unknown). In the 1920 federal census, William and Minnie were recorded as being 48 and 39 years old, respectively, which implies that Minnie was born about 1880, not 1875. She was said to have been a "decade or so younger" than her husband, which gives additional credibility to this census record as evidence of Hooker's origins.

The Hooker children were homeschooled. They were permitted to listen only to religious songs; the spirituals sung in church were their earliest exposure to music. In 1921, their parents separated. The next year, their mother married William Moore, a blues singer, who provided John Lee with an introduction to the guitar (and whom he would later credit for his distinctive playing style).

Moore was his first significant blues influence. He was a local blues guitarist who, in Shreveport, Louisiana, learned to play a droning, one-chord blues that was strikingly different from the Delta blues of the time.

Another influence was Tony Hollins, who dated Hooker's sister Alice, helped teach Hooker to play, and gave him his first guitar. For the rest of his life, Hooker regarded Hollins as a formative influence on his style of playing and his career as a musician. Among the songs that Hollins reputedly taught Hooker were versions of "Crawlin' King Snake" and "Catfish Blues".

At the age of 14, Hooker ran away from home, reportedly never seeing his mother or stepfather again. In the mid-1930s, he lived in Memphis, Tennessee, where he performed on Beale Street, at the New Daisy Theatre and occasionally at house parties.

He worked in factories in various cities during World War II, eventually getting a job with the Ford Motor Company in Detroit in 1943. He frequented the blues clubs and bars on Hastings Street, the heart of the black entertainment district, on Detroit's east side. In a city noted for its pianists, guitar players were scarce. Hooker's popularity grew quickly as he performed in Detroit clubs, and, seeking an instrument louder than his acoustic guitar, he bought his first electric guitar.

== Earlier career ==
Hooker was working as a janitor in a Detroit steel mill when his recording career began in 1948, when Modern Records, based in Los Angeles, released a demo he had recorded for Bernie Besman in Detroit. The single, "Boogie Chillen'", became a hit and the best-selling race record of 1949. Though illiterate, Hooker was a prolific lyricist. In addition to adapting traditional blues lyrics, he composed original songs. In the 1950s, like many black musicians, Hooker earned little from record sales, and so he often recorded variations of his songs for different studios for an up-front fee. To evade his recording contract, he used various pseudonyms, including John Lee Booker (for Chess Records and Chance Records in 1951–1952), Johnny Lee (for De Luxe Records in 1953–1954), John Lee, John Lee Cooker, Texas Slim, Delta John, Birmingham Sam and his Magic Guitar, Johnny Williams, and the Boogie Man.

His early solo songs were recorded by Bernie Besman. Hooker rarely played with a standard beat, opting instead to adjust the tempo to fit the needs of the song. This often made it difficult to use backing musicians, who were not accustomed to Hooker's musical vagaries. As a result, Besman recorded Hooker playing guitar, singing, and stomping on a wooden pallet in time with the music.

For much of this period, he recorded and toured with Eddie Kirkland. In Hooker's later sessions for Vee-Jay Records in Chicago, studio musicians accompanied him on most of his recordings, including Eddie Taylor, who could handle his musical idiosyncrasies. "Boom Boom" (1962) and "Dimples," two popular songs by Hooker, were originally released by Vee-Jay.

== Later career ==
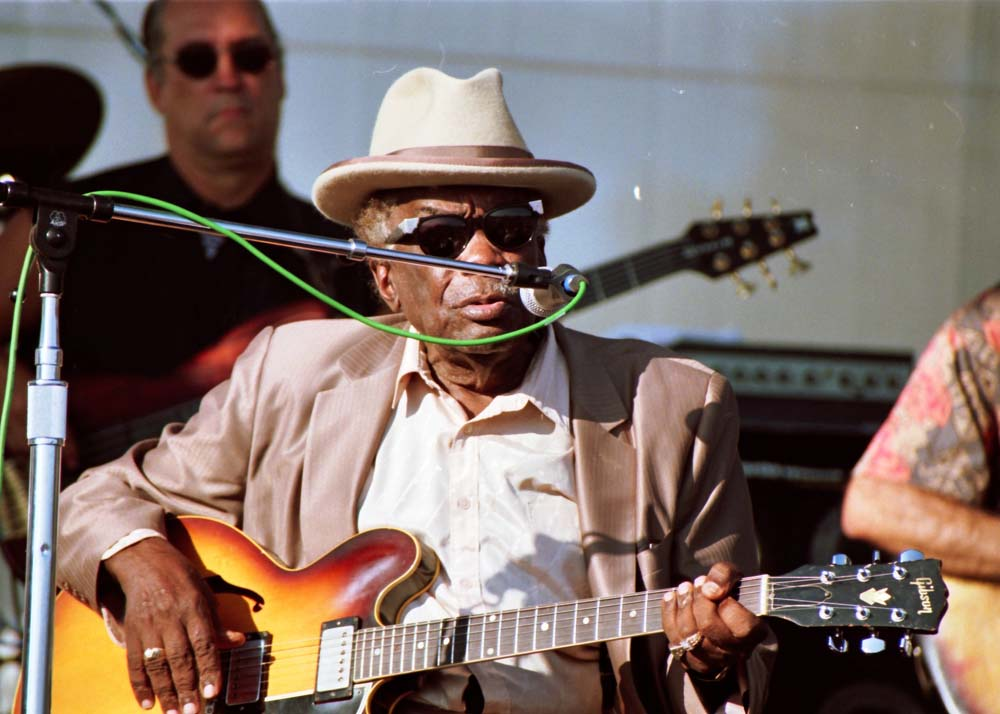
Hooker performing at the Long Beach Blues Festival, Long Beach, California, August 31, 1997

Beginning in 1962, Hooker gained greater exposure when he toured Europe in the annual American Folk Blues Festival. His "Dimples" became a successful single on the UK Singles Chart in 1964, eight years after its first US release. Hooker began to perform and record with rock musicians. One of his earliest collaborations was with British blues rock band the Groundhogs. In 1970, he recorded the joint album Hooker 'n Heat, with the American blues and boogie rock group Canned Heat, whose repertoire included adaptations of Hooker songs. It became the first of Hooker's albums to reach the Billboard charts, peaking at number 78 on the Billboard 200. Other collaboration albums soon followed, including Endless Boogie (1971) and Never Get Out of These Blues Alive (1972), which included Steve Miller, Elvin Bishop, Van Morrison, and others.

Hooker appeared in the 1980 film The Blues Brothers as a street musician playing "Boom Boom." In 1989, he recorded the album The Healer with Carlos Santana, Bonnie Raitt, and others. The 1990s saw additional collaboration albums: Mr. Lucky (1991), Chill Out (1995), and Don't Look Back (1997) with Morrison, Santana, Los Lobos, and additional guest musicians. His re-recording of "Boom Boom" (the title track for his 1992 album) with guitarist Jimmie Vaughan became Hooker's highest charting single (number 16) in the UK. Come See About Me, a 2004 DVD, includes performances filmed between 1960 and 1994 and interviews with several of the musicians.

Hooker owned five houses in his later life, including ones in the California cities of Los Altos, Redwood City, and Long Beach. On June 21, 2001, Hooker died in his sleep at home in Los Altos.

== Awards and recognition ==
Among his many awards, Hooker was inducted into the Blues Hall of Fame in 1980, and the Rock and Roll Hall of Fame in 1991. He was a recipient of a 1983 National Heritage Fellowship awarded by the National Endowment for the Arts, which is the United States government's highest honor in the folk and traditional arts. He was awarded the Grammy Lifetime Achievement Award in 2000 and received a star on the Hollywood Walk of Fame in 1997. He was also inducted into the Mississippi Musicians Hall of Fame.

Two of his songs, "Boogie Chillen'" and "Boom Boom", are included in the Rock and Roll Hall of Fame's list of the 500 Songs That Shaped Rock and Roll. "Boogie Chillen'" is also included in the Recording Industry Association of America's list of the "Songs of the Century".

=== Grammy Awards ===
- Best Traditional Blues Recording, 1990, for I'm in the Mood, with Bonnie Raitt
- Best Traditional Blues Album, 1995, for Chill Out
- Best Traditional Blues Recording, 1998, for Don't Look Back
- Best Pop Collaboration with Vocals, 1998, "Don't Look Back", with Van Morrison
- Grammy Lifetime Achievement Award, 2000
- National Rhythm & Blues Hall of Fame, 2021–22

== Discography ==
- The Country Blues of John Lee Hooker (1959)
- Travelin' (1960)
- That's My Story (1960)
- The Folk Lore of John Lee Hooker (1961)
- Burnin' (1962)
- The Big Soul of John Lee Hooker (1963)
- John Lee Hooker on Campus (1964)
- ...And Seven Nights (1965)
- It Serve You Right to Suffer (1966)
- The Real Folk Blues (1966)
- Urban Blues (1967)
- Simply the Truth (1969)
- If You Miss 'Im...I Got 'Im (1969)
- Get Back Home (1969)
- I Feel Good! (1971)
- Hooker 'n Heat (1971)
- Endless Boogie (1971)
- Never Get Out of These Blues Alive (1972)
- Born in Mississippi, Raised Up in Tennessee (1973)
- Free Beer and Chicken (1974)
- Jealous (1987)
- The Healer (1989)
- Mr. Lucky (1991)
- Boom Boom (1992)
- Chill Out (1995)
- Don't Look Back (1997)

== Film ==
- The Blues Brothers on Maxwell Street (Chicago) outside Aretha Franklin's restaurant (1980)
- John Lee Hooker & Furry Lewis [DVD] (1995)
- John Lee Hooker: That's My Story [DVD] (2001)
- John Lee Hooker Rare Performances 1960–1984 [DVD] (2002)
- Come See About Me [DVD] (2004)
- John Lee Hooker: Bits and Pieces About … [DVD and CD] (2006)

== Sources ==
- Dahl, Bill (1996). "John Lee Hooker". In Erlewine, Michael; Bogdanov, Vladimir; Woodstra, Chris; Koda, Cub (eds.). All Music Guide to the Blues: The Experts' Guide to the Best Blues Recordings. All Music Guide to the Blues. San Francisco: Miller Freeman Books. ISBN 0-87930-424-3.
- Eagle, Bob L.; LeBlanc, Eric S. (2013). Blues: A Regional Experience. Santa Barbara, California: Praeger. ISBN 978-0313344244.
- Leadbitter, Mike; Slaven, Neil (1987). Blues Records, 1943–1970: A Selective Discography. Record Information Services. ISBN 978-0-907872-07-8.
- Murray, Charles Shaar (2002). Boogie Man: The Adventures of John Lee Hooker in the American Twentieth Century. New York City: Macmillan. ISBN 978-0-312-27006-3.
- Oliver, Paul (1968). Screening the Blues: Aspects of the Blues Tradition. New York City: Da Capo Press. ISBN 978-0306803444.
- Palmer, Robert (1981). Deep Blues. New York City: Penguin Books. ISBN 0-14006-223-8.
- Whitburn, Joel (1988). Top R&B Singles 1942–1988. Menomonee Falls, Wisconsin: Record Research. ISBN 0-89820-068-7.
