= Frozen Alive! =

Live album by Albert Collins
- Released: 1981
- Recorded: March 1981
- Venue: Union Bar, Minneapolis
- Genre: Blues
- Label: Alligator
- Producer: Bruce Iglauer, Dick Shurman

Albert Collins chronology
Frostbite (1980)	Frozen Alive! (1981)	Don't Lose Your Cool (1983)

Frozen Alive! is a live album by the American musician Albert Collins, released in 1981. Collins supported it with a North American tour. Frozen Alive! was nominated for a Grammy Award for "Best Ethnic or Traditional Recording".

== Production ==
Produced by Bruce Iglauer and Dick Shurman, the album was recorded in March 1981 at the Union Bar in Minneapolis. Collins was backed by his band, the Icebreakers: Allen Batts on organ, A.C. Reed on tenor sax, Marvin Jackson on guitar, Casey Jones on drums, and Johnny B. Gayden on bass. "Things I Used to Do" is a cover of the song by Guitar Slim. "Angel of Mercy" was written by Albert King. "Caldonia" is a version of the song made famous by Louis Jordan. "Cold Cuts", an instrumental, features solos by each member of the Icebreakers.

== Critical reception ==
Professional ratings
Review scores
Source	Rating
All Music Guide	3/5 stars
Robert Christgau	B+
The Encyclopedia of Popular Music	3/5 stars
The Grove Press Guide to the Blues on CD	4/5 stars
Houston Chronicle	4/5 stars
Lincoln Journal Star	4/5 stars
MusicHound Blues: The Essential Album Guide	5/5 stars
Oakland Tribune	3/4 stars
The Penguin Guide to Blues Recordings	3/4 stars
The Rolling Stone Album Guide	3/5 stars

The Lincoln Journal Star said that Collins "has an ample supply of wit and chops to burn." The Pittsburgh Press called the album "one of the best club recordings in quite a while." Newsday stated, "Collins often begins with some straight notes before his leads evolve in complexity and intensity." The Courier-News concluded that Collins "is one of the few blues guitarists who remains as consistently appealing on slow blues as he does on faster shuffles and R&B."

The Houston Chronicle praised the "fluid and graceful" playing. Robert Christgau noted that "Frosty" establishes "a bite and authority that are never relinquished." The Philadelphia Daily News stated, "When he plays, the sound is so searing that the strings seem ever on the verge of 'melt down'." The Atlanta Journal-Constitution listed Frozen Alive! among the best albums of 1981. The Valley Advocate included it among the 12 best blues albums of 1981.

== Track listing ==
Side A

1. "Frosty"
2. "Angel of Mercy"
3. "I Got That Feeling"

Side B

1. "Caldonia"
2. "Things I Used to Do"
3. "Got a Mind to Travel"
4. "Cold Cuts"
