= John Wooler =

American record producer and music executive

Background information
- Born: Scotland, United Kingdom
- Occupations: Record producer; music executive; radio host
- Years active: 1982–present
- Labels: Virgin Records UK (1984–1994); Virgin Records America (1994–2002); Pointblank Records (founded 1989); Back Porch Records (founded 1997); EMI Music Group; Universal Music Group

John Wooler is a Scottish-American record producer, global licensing, label relations, and record label executive. With 37 years of worldwide experience in the music industry, artists that he has worked with have received 26 Grammy nominations, with a total of five Grammy Awards wins. He has worked with several multi-platinum artists on producing their albums with over 170 albums recorded under his credits.

As an industry executive at Virgin Records UK and Virgin Records America, he signed many artists and is known for his production work including The Rolling Stones, Simple Minds, Genesis, Roy Orbison, Peter Gabriel, XTC, Iggy Pop, Van Morrison, Adam Duritz, John Lee Hooker, Albert Collins, Young Dubliners, Dan Brodie, and John Hammond, Joan Baez to name a few and launched the biggest-selling NOW compilations in the United States.

He founded Pointblank Records, an imprint label of Virgin Records, which signed acts like Isaac Hayes, Pops Staples, and Charlie Musselwhite and co-founded Back Porch Records, which was an Americana and roots rock sub-label of Virgin Records that signed artists including Cracker, and Over the Rhine.

== Career ==
In 1982, early in his career, Wooler started as a music researcher and assistant producer working for the British Broadcasting Company before joining Virgin Records UK in 1984, a popular avant-garde British record label founded by Richard Branson, and business partners Nik Powell, and Simon Draper who was Branson's cousin in 1972 and now owned by Universal Music Group. Wooler worked directly with Simon Draper both at Virgin Records UK where he eventually started a subsidiary, Pointblank Records. In 1994, he served in the position of senior vice president thereafter at Virgin Records America until 2003.

Wooler's primary role at Virgin Records was artists and repertoire (A&R) where he brought his wide-ranging expertise into the field. He signed artists into the record label, developing and producing many of them as the senior executive, and was also in charge of the commercial marketing of the label. He founded Exolution in 2007 and was a music consultant and producer, promoting and marketing bands on various media platforms in America. In 2011, he became the senior vice president for media services and label relations at PlayNetwork and vice president of strategic licensing and label relations at Mood Media in 2022 for its parent company.

=== Production ===
Wooler's style of production work originates from his passion for blues, Americana, and classic soul genres. His production has led to recording over 170 albums as well as working as their A&R with numerous Grammy Awards wins and nominations. The notable productions he made with known artists and bands branded his career highlights in the record business.

He has developed and signed new talents like Dan Brodie who was nominated for two Ari Awards, a comparable to Grammy Awards in Australia, for his debut album among others. He once said, "being able to contribute to the career of artists that I loved or developing new talent and hoping to see them have success is by far the most rewarding feeling," was his proudest achievement in one of his interviews.

== Record labels ==
=== 1984–2003: Virgin Records UK and Virgin Records America ===
Wooler's tenure at Virgin Records UK (1984–1994) in the United Kingdom as a record label executive and as senior vice president at Virgin Records America (1994–2003) in the United States spanned nearly 20 years. He worked closely with many artists and was responsible for signing acts and producing records including artists like The Rolling Stones, Iggy Pop, Van Morrison, JJ Cale, Simple Minds, Genesis as well as new and upcoming artists such as Cracker, Over the Rhine, Dan Brodie and the Young Dubliners where they expanded their roster to a variety of genres in the past. Virgin Records' signing of the punk rock band Sex Pistols in the early days became the first of many successful signings that followed, catapulting the record label into the mainstream.

=== 1989–2011: Pointblank Records ===
In 1989, Wooler founded and launched the record label Pointblank Records in the United Kingdom while he was still at Virgin Records UK. a subsidiary of Virgin Records as deputy head of artist and repertoire and president of the label, which he ran for 13 consecutive years. He signed many artists and produced their records such as Charlie Watts of The Rolling Stones, Van Morrison, Albert Collins, Isaac Hayes, Pops Staples, and Charlie Musselwhite, mostly on Pointblank Records in the early days. Wooler and Simon Draper often worked together as the A&R for many artists in their albums.

=== 1997–2010: Back Porch Records ===
By 1997, Wooler co-founded Back Porch Records, also a Virgin Records imprint and currently owned by Universal Music Group, alongside Ken Pedersen, who was also an executive at Virgin Records, which was an Americana and roots rock genre-centered record label that signed known artists like John Hammond, Charlie Sexton, Cracker, Over the Rhine, and The Subdudes among others. Back Porch Records was a Milwaukee-based record label, which had 49 album releases in total since it was founded.

== Album production and A&R discography ==
Additional list of artists for Wooler's production work and his role as an A&R at Virgin Records that went multi-platinum, gold, and silver, totaling more than 170 albums, included:

- 1985: Loose Ends So Where Are You? – (Silver)
- 1985: Do-Re-Mi Domestic Harmony – Australia (Gold)
- 1986: Peter Gabriel and the Real World – So
- 1986: It Bites – Calling All The Heroes Top 5 Singles (silver)
- 1987: Roy Orbison – In Dreams: The Greatest Hits
- 1988: Johnny Hates Jazz Turn Back the Clock – No. 1 album in the UK
- Shattered Dreams No. 2 in the US Billboard Hot 100 (Multi-platinum)
- 1988: Colin James Five Long Years – (Platinum)
- 1990: Gary Moore – Still Got the Blues (Multi-platinum)
- 1991: Tony Banks – Still – Genesis
- 1992: Joan Baez – Play Me Backwards
- 1992: Loudon Wainwright III – Grown Man
- 1992: Pops Staples – Peace To The Neighborhood
- 1994: Sanne Salomonsen – Language of Heart – (Multi-platinum)
- 1995: Isaac Hayes – Raw & Refined
- 1996: Iggy Pop – Naughty Little Doggie
- 1996: Charlie Watts of The Rolling Stones – Long Ago & Far Away
- 1997: John Lee Hooker Don't Look Back – (Multi-platinum)
- 1998: Mike Oldfield – Islands (Gold)
- 1999: Van Morrison Back on Top – UK and US (Gold)
- 1999: Eliades Ochoa – Sublime Ilusión
- 2002: Dan Brodie & The Broken Arrows – Jesus Try And Save Me
- 2006: Ron Wood of The Rolling Stones – Ronnie Wood Anthology: the Essential Crossexion
- 2008: Adam Duritz – Counting Crows

== Album compilations ==
In addition, Wooler operated the commercial marketing side of the record label both at Virgin Records UK and Virgin Records America as a senior executive. He was responsible for launching the NOW record series worldwide that became the biggest-selling compilations in the United States and various compilations on DRTV such as Pure Moods, which sold over a million copies before its official release in stores.

== Awards and nominations ==
For his involvement as a record producer and an executive producer in the record business, artists that Wooler has worked with have received 26 Grammy nominations, with a total of five Grammy Awards wins over the years. He was nominated for several Grammy Awards prior to his first win, which took place in New York.

== Other ventures ==
Wooler is a sought-after speaker and contributor to various music industry organizations, who often speaks where the current music is trending. He is currently on the advisory board and consults with several record companies on music-related projects which includes major labels like EMI Music Group. Additionally, he is a weekly radio host who produces blues and classic soul shows for various syndicated radio stations around the world.

For eight years, he was a professor of music industry studies at California State Polytechnic University, Pomona.
