= Jimmy Reed Plays 12 String Guitar Blues =

Studio album by Jimmy Reed
- Released: 1963
- Recorded: 1963
- Studio: Chicago, IL
- Genre: Jazz
- Length: 28:35
- Label: Vee-Jay; LPS-1073

Jimmy Reed chronology
Jimmy Reed Sings the Best of the Blues (1963)	Jimmy Reed Plays 12 String Guitar Blues (1963)	I'm Jimmy Reed (1964)

Jimmy Reed Plays 12 String Guitar Blues is an album by blues musician Jimmy Reed recorded in Chicago in 1963 and released by the Vee-Jay label.

== Reception ==
Professional ratings
Review scores
Source	Rating
AllMusic	4.5/5 stars
The Penguin Guide to Blues Recordings	2/4 stars

AllMusic reviewer Bruce Eder stated: "Jimmy Reed -- not a celebrated 12-string guitar player like Leadbelly or any of the other renowned instrumentalists who came up in Leadbelly's wake -- cut this acoustic 12-string instrumental album, which has become an enduring classic of the genre. Reed was as skilled at presenting his guitar work as he was as a singer ... Consisting of recognizable Reed originals and a couple of other blues standards thrown in, the music comes off very well, mixing electric guitar with acoustic 12-string and Reed's harmonica substituting for the vocal parts ... The result is yet another classic album by Reed, and one of the more straightforward and accessible bodies of blues played on 12-string that one can find". The Penguin Guide to Blues Recordings suggests that it is not, in fact, Reed who plays the 12-string guitar on this album.

== Track listing ==
All compositions by Jimmy Reed except where noted

1. "Bright Lights, Big City" – 2:29
2. "St. Louis Blues" (W. C. Handy) – 2:27
3. "Blue Carnegie" – 2:08
4. "New Chicago Blues" – 2:19
5. "Big Boss Man" (Luther Dixon, Al Smith) – 2:50
6. "Hush Hush" – 2:27
7. "Blues for Twelve Strings" – 1:40
8. "Baby, What You Want Me to Do" – 2:27
9. "Boogie in the Dark" – 2:37
10. "Take Out Some Insurance" (Charles Singleton, Waldense Hall) – 2:24
11. "Aw Shucks, Hush Your Mouth" – 2:23
12. "Close Together" – 2:24

== Personnel ==
- Jimmy Reed – 12-string guitar, guitar, harmonica
- Lefty Bates, Eddie Taylor – guitar
- Marcus "Benjy" Johnson – bass
- Earl Phillips, Morris Wilkerson – drums
- Mary Lee Reed – vocals

Technical

- George Whiteman - cover photography, design
