= Don't Lose Your Cool =

Studio album by Albert Collins
- Released: 1983
- Studio: Red Label, Winnetka, Illinois
- Genre: Blues
- Length: 40:09
- Label: Alligator
- Producer: Bruce Iglauer, Dick Shurman, Albert Collins

Albert Collins chronology
Frozen Alive! (1981)	Don't Lose Your Cool (1983)	Cold Snap (1986)

Professional ratings
Review scores
Source	Rating
AllMusic	4/5 stars
The Penguin Guide to Blues Recordings	2.5/4 stars

Don't Lose Your Cool is a studio album by the American musician Albert Collins, released in 1983 by Alligator Records.

== Track listing ==
1. "Get to Gettin'" (Big Walter Price) – 3:12
2. "My Mind Is Trying to Leave Me" (Percy Mayfield) – 7:42
3. "Broke" (Chuck Higgins) – 4:12
4. "Don't Lose Your Cool" (Collins) – 4:39
5. "When a Guitar Plays the Blues" (Harvard Hables, Roy Lee Johnson) – 5:12
6. "But I Was Cool" (Oscar Brown, Jr.) – 3:09
7. "Meltdown" (Collins) – 4:03
8. "Ego Trip" (Collins) – 4:32
9. "Quicksand" (Guitar Slim) – 3:28

== Personnel ==
- Albert Collins - guitar, vocals

The Ice Breakers

- Johnny Gayden - bass
- Casey Jones - drums, vocals
- Larry Burton - guitar
- Chris Foreman - keyboards
- A.C. Reed - tenor saxophone
- Abb Locke, Dino Spells - alto and tenor saxophone

Technical

- Fred Breitberg - engineer, mixing
- Michael Weinstein - photography
