= Soulin' =

Studio album by Jimmy Reed
- Released: 1967
- Recorded: May 1966, May 26, 1967 and April 18, 1967
- Studio: Chicago, IL
- Genre: Blues
- Length: 27:06
- Label: BluesWay; BL/BLS 6009
- Producer: Al Smith

Jimmy Reed chronology
The New Jimmy Reed Album (1967)	Soulin' (1967)	Big Boss Man (1968)

Soulin' is an album by blues musician Jimmy Reed released by the BluesWay label in 1967.

== Reception ==
Professional ratings
Review scores
Source	Rating
AllMusic	2.5/5 stars

AllMusic reviewer Stephen Thomas Erlewine stated the album was: "bogged down by a production that tries to move Reed into the blues-rock era. Consequently, the album is primarily of interest to completists, since even hardcore Reed fans may find the production disconcerting".

== Track listing ==
All compositions credited to Al Smith except where noted

1. "Buy Me a Hound Dog" – 2:30
2. "Feel Like I Want to Ramble" – 2:35
3. "I Wake Up at Daybreak" – 2:16
4. "Peepin' and Hidin'" – 2:36
5. "Don't Press Your Luck Woman" – 2:28
6. "I'm Not Going to Let You Down" – 2:35
7. "I'm Knockin' on Your Door" – 2:40
8. "Crazy About Oklahoma" – 2:40
9. "Cousin Peaches" – 2:07
10. "Ain't No Time for Fussin'" – 2:42
11. "Dedication to Sonny" – 1:57
- Recorded in Chicago in May 1966 (tracks 7–9 & 11), May 26, 1967 (tracks 1, 2, 4 & 5) and April 18, 1967 (tracks 3, 6 & 10)

== Personnel ==
- Jimmy Reed – guitar, vocals, harmonica
- William "Lefty" Bates (all tracks), Eddie Taylor (tracks 7–9 & 11) – guitar
- Jimmy Gresham (tracks 1–6 & 10), Jimmy Reed Jr (tracks 7–9 & 11), Phil Upchurch (tracks 7–9 & 11) – bass
- Al Duncan – drums
