= Southern Fried =

Southern Fried may refer to:

- Southern Fried (John Hammond album) (1969)
- Southern Fried (Bill Anderson album) (1983)
