= Delta Hurricane =

Studio album by Larry McCray
- Released: 1993
- Genre: Blues
- Label: Pointblank
- Producer: Mike Vernon

Larry McCray chronology
Ambition (1990)	Delta Hurricane (1993)	Meet Me at the Lake (1996)

Delta Hurricane is the second album by the American musician Larry McCray, released in 1993. McCray supported the album with a North American tour.

== Production ==
Recorded in Memphis, the album was produced by Mike Vernon. Unlike McCray's debut, Delta Hurricane was recorded as a band album, rather than a demo on which other players contributed. McCray's guitar style was mostly influenced by his father and older sister.

"Soul Shine" is a cover of the Warren Haynes song. "Blue River" is an instrumental. A horn section played on many of the songs. Tony Zamagni played keyboards on the album. McCray's brother Steve played drums.

== Critical reception ==
Professional ratings
Review scores
Source	Rating
AllMusic	4/5 stars
Chicago Tribune	3.5/4 stars
The Encyclopedia of Popular Music	3/5 stars

Stereo Review wrote that "McCray is, above all, a superb blues-guitar player, combining the lyricism of an Eric Clapton with the power of a Son Seals." The Chicago Tribune noted that "McCray is very much a '90s bluesman, unafraid of mixing in rock, soul and even the occasional heavy-metal touch in his music." The State concluded that "McCray's paint-peeling guitar solos are simply awesome, packed with the kind of electric fire that Muddy Waters dreamed about on his first trip to Chicago."

The Toronto Star determined that "the great combo of tenderness and toughness in Larry McCray highlights Delta Hurricane. The Austin American-Statesman deemed Delta Hurricane the eighth best blues album of 1993, writing that "McCray forcefully makes his case for inclusion in the upper echelon of contemporary blues artists." The Boston Herald called it "the best contemporary blues release of the year—and maybe last year, too."

AllMusic wrote that McCray's "guitar work is ... authentic; there aren't any flashy phrases or flamboyant riffs, just pile-driving lines, barreling statements and energetic support for his vocals."

== Track listing ==
All songs written by McCray except "Soul Shine", which was written by Warren Haynes

No.	Title	Length
1.	"Delta Hurricane"
2.	"Adding Up"
3.	"Last Four Nickels"
4.	"Soul Shine"
5.	"Not That Much"
6.	"Last Hand of the Night"
7.	"Witchin' Moon"
8.	"Blue River"
9.	"Hole in My Heart"
10.	"Three Straight Days of Rain"
11.	"Blues in the City"
