= Larry McCray =

American blues guitarist and singer (born 1960)

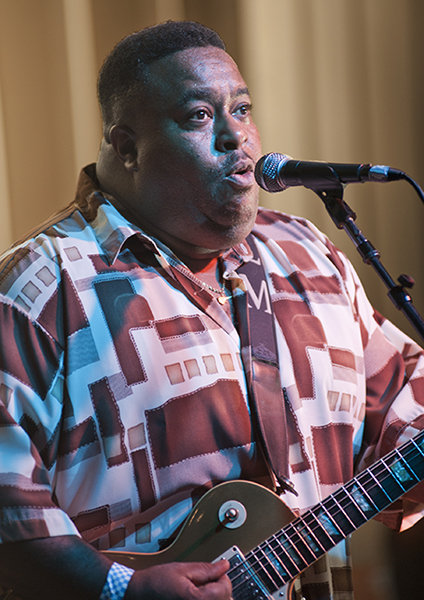
- McCray at the 2011 Monterey Blues Festival

Background information
- Born: Larry McCray; April 5, 1960 (age 66); Magnolia, Arkansas, United States
- Genres: Blues
- Occupations: Guitarist, singer, songwriter
- Instruments: Guitar, vocals
- Years active: 1980s–present
- Labels: Pointblank, Virgin, Atomic Theory, House of Blues, Magnolia, DixieFrog, Charisma, Bear Family, Keeping the Blues Alive
- Website: https://larrymccrayofficial.com/

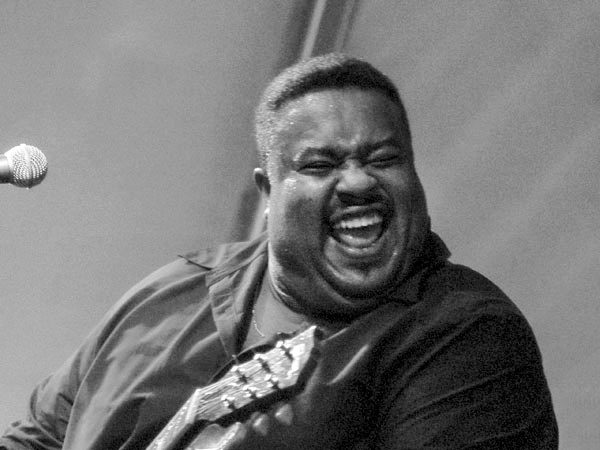
Larry McCray (2012) in Aarhus, Denmark

Larry McCray (born April 5, 1960), is an American blues guitarist and singer from Magnolia, Arkansas.

== Early life ==
McCray, the second youngest of nine siblings, grew up living on a farm. McCray learned guitar from his sister, Clara. "She used to play real low-down and dirty", McCray recalled years later. His family moved to Saginaw, Michigan, in 1972.

McCray took his influence from his sibling and the three Kings (B.B., Freddie and Albert), to playing the local club circuit, with his brothers Carl on bass guitar and Steve on drums.

== Career ==
After high school, McCray worked at General Motors on the assembly line, before recording his debut album, Ambition (1991), via Pointblank Records. It was recorded in a friend's basement recording studio in Detroit. He was soon touring with a fellow record label artist, Albert Collins. His 1993 follow-up, Delta Hurricane, was produced by the veteran British blues devotee, Mike Vernon.

In 1999, McCray recorded a cover version of Bob Dylan's "All Along the Watchtower" for the tribute album, Tangled Up in Blues. In 2000, McCray founded his own independent record label, Magnolia Records, and Believe It was its first release. The same year, McCray played alongside Jimmy Thackery, as guest guitarists on Sista Monica Parker's album, People Love the Blues. Magnolia released McCray's first live album, Live on Interstate 75, in mid-2006. This was followed with Larry McCray, in 2007.

His 2015 tour commenced at the King Biscuit Blues Festival in Helena-West Helena, Arkansas on October 11, where McCray was honored with the "Sunshine" Sonny Payne Award for Blues Excellence.

In 2022, McCray released his Blues Without You album on Joe Bonamassa's KTBA Records. It was nominated Best Contemporary Blues Album via the Blues Music Awards. The album was also voted the No. 1 album in 2022 by Blues Rock Review magazine.

== Discography ==
- Ambition (1990)
- Delta Hurricane (1993)
- Meet Me at the Lake with the Bluegills (1996)
- Born to Play the Blues (1998)
- Believe It (2000)
- Blues is My Business (2001)
- Live on Interstate 75 (2006)
- Larry McCray (2007)
- The Gibson Sessions (2015)
- Blues Without You (2022)
- Heartbreak City (2025)
