= The Folk Lore of John Lee Hooker =

Studio album / live album by John Lee Hooker
- Released: August or September 1961
- Recorded: 1960–1961
- Venue: Newport Folk Festival, Newport, Rhode Island
- Studio: Universal Recording, Chicago
- Genre: Blues
- Length: 36:56
- Label: Vee-Jay
- Producer: Esmond Edwards

The Folk Lore of John Lee Hooker is an album by blues musician John Lee Hooker, released by Vee-Jay Records in August or September 1961. Hooker recorded most of the songs on January 4, 1961, in Chicago, with two recorded live at the Newport Folk Festival June 25, 1960.

== Reception ==
Professional ratings
Review scores
Source	Rating
AllMusic	3/5 stars
The Penguin Guide to Blues Recordings	2.5/4 stars
The Virgin Encyclopedia of The Blues	4/5 stars

The Penguin Guide to Blues Recordings wrote that "Vee-Jay were reaching for Hooker's perceived new audience among folkniks, yet only 'Tupelo' and 'The Hobo' from his set with acoustic guitar at the 1960 Newport Folk Festival, represent the 'folk blues' angle Hooker had begun to develop a year earlier; the rest is typical of his Vee-Jay work, especially the four tracks with a band."

AllMusic reviewer Al Campbell stated: "The Folk Lore of John Lee Hooker was released in 1961, combining 12 tracks of both acoustic and electric tunes ... recommended."

== Track listing ==
All compositions are credited to John Lee Hooker.

1. "Tupelo" – 3:22
2. "I'm Mad Again" – 2:39
3. "I'm Going Upstairs" – 2:56
4. "Want Ad Blues" – 2:16
5. "Five Long Years" – 3:38
6. "I Like to See You Walk" – 2:52
7. "The Hobo" – 3:01
8. "Hard-Headed Woman" – 2:31
9. "Wednesday Evening Blues" – 3:59
10. "Take Me As I Am" – 3:02
11. "My First Wife Left Me" – 3:35
12. "You're Looking Good Tonight" – 3:00

== Session details ==
Details are taken from the original Vee-Jay album liner notes. Tracks 1 and 7 were recorded at the Newport Folk Festival on June 25, 1960; the remaining tracks were recorded at Universal Recording Studio in Chicago on January 4, 1961.

- John Lee Hooker – guitar, vocals (unaccompanied on tracks 1, 6, 7, 9–12)
- Jimmy Reed – harmonica, guitar (tracks 2–4, 8)
- William "Lefty" Bates – guitar (tracks 2–4, 8)
- Quinn Wilson – bass (tracks 2–4, 8)
- Earl Phillips – drums (tracks 2–4, 8)
