= Wicked Grin =

Studio album by John P. Hammond
- Released: March 13, 2001
- Studios: Prairie Sun Recording Studios, Cotati, California; Alpha & Omega Recording, San Rafael, California
- Genre: Blues
- Length: 55:40
- Label: Pointblank
- Producer: Tom Waits

John P. Hammond chronology
Long As I Have You (1998)	Wicked Grin (2001)	Ready for Love (2003)

Professional ratings
Aggregate scores
Source	Rating
Metacritic	88/100
Review scores
Source	Rating
Allmusic	4/5 stars
The Penguin Guide to Blues Recordings	3/4 stars

Wicked Grin is the twenty-eighth studio album from blues singer John P. Hammond. The album is a collection of songs written by Hammond's friend Tom Waits, who produced the project. It was released in March 2001 on Pointblank Records.

== Track listing ==
No.	Title	Writer(s)	Length
1.	"2:19"	Kathleen Brennan, Tom Waits	4:42
2.	"Heartattack and Vine"	Tom Waits	4:40
3.	"Clap Hands"	Tom Waits	3:59
4.	"'Til the Money Runs Out"	Tom Waits	4:02
5.	"16 Shells From a Thirty-Ought Six"	Tom Waits	4:37
6.	"Buzz Fledderjohn"	Tom Waits	4:14
7.	"Get Behind the Mule"	Kathleen Brennan, Tom Waits	5:54
8.	"Shore Leave"	Tom Waits	2:58
9.	"Fannin Street"	Kathleen Brennan, Tom Waits, Huddie Ledbetter	4:48
10.	"Jockey Full of Bourbon"	Tom Waits	3:32
11.	"Big Black Mariah"	Tom Waits	4:09
12.	"Murder in the Red Barn"	Kathleen Brennan, Tom Waits	5:56
13.	"I Know I've Been Changed"	Traditional	2:19

== Personnel ==
- John P. Hammond – vocals, guitar; acoustic slide guitar and harmonica on "Buzz Fledderjohn"
- Tom Waits – guitar; plucked piano on "Buzz Fledderjohn"; piano on "Fannin Street"
- Larry Taylor – bass
- Augie Meyers – piano, Hammond organ, Wurlitzer, Vox organ, accordion
- Stephen Hodges – drums, percussion
- Charlie Musselwhite – harmonica

== Critical reception ==
Q listed Wicked Grin as one of the best 50 albums of 2001.

== Charts ==
Chart	Peak position
Finnish Albums (Suomen virallinen lista)	19
Italian Albums (FIMI)	30
US Heatseekers Albums (Billboard)	30
US Top Blues Albums (Billboard)	3
