= John P. Hammond =

American musician (1942–2026)

John Hammond Jr.
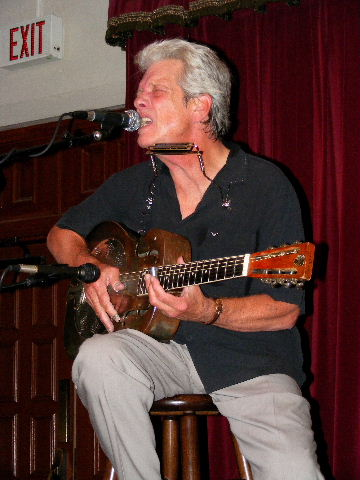
- Hammond performing at the Cactus Cafe in Austin, Texas, 2008

Background information
- Also known as: John Hammond Jr.
- Born: John Paul Hammond; November 13, 1942; New York City, U.S.
- Died: February 28, 2026 (aged 83) Jersey City, New Jersey, U.S.
- Genres: Blues; rock; barrelhouse
- Occupation: Musician
- Instruments: Guitar; vocals; harmonica
- Years active: 1962–2026
- Labels: Vanguard Records; Atlantic Records; Columbia Records; Capricorn Records; Rounder Records; Flying Fish Records; Pointblank Records; Back Porch Records; Chesky Records; Palmetto Records
- Website: johnhammond.com

John Paul Hammond (November 13, 1942 – February 28, 2026) was an American blues singer and guitarist whose career spanned six decades. He was the son of record producer John Henry Hammond Jr., a descendant of Cornelius Vanderbilt, and performed as John Hammond and John Hammond Jr.

== Early life and education ==
John Hammond was the oldest son of record producer and talent scout John Henry Hammond and his first wife, actress Jemison McBride. He was a descendant of William Henry Vanderbilt, the eldest son of the more notable Cornelius Vanderbilt, the family's founder and the patriarch of the prominent Vanderbilt family, through his paternal grandmother Emily Vanderbilt Sloane Hammond. He was the fourth and last generation of John Hammonds descended from General John Henry Hammond, a Union army officer, John Henry Hammond, a lawyer, and John Henry Hammond, a record producer. He had a brother, Jason, and a stepsister, (Esme) Rosita Sarnoff, the daughter of his father's second wife, Esme O'Brien Sarnoff. His middle name, Paul, was in honor of his godfather and friend of his father, the singer, actor, and civil rights activist Paul Robeson. He only saw his father a few times a year while growing up in the West Village of Manhattan with his mother.

He began playing guitar in high school, partially inspired by the album Jimmy Reed at Carnegie Hall. He attended Antioch College in Yellow Springs, Ohio, for a year but dropped out to pursue a career in music. By the mid-1960s he was on national tours and living in Greenwich Village. He befriended and recorded with many electric blues musicians while in New York, including Jimi Hendrix, Eric Clapton, Levon Helm's New Hawks (later known as The Band), Mike Bloomfield, Dr. John, and Duane Allman.

In February 2009, Hammond told Blue Ridge Country, "I first became aware of blues music when my father brought me to hear Big Bill Broonzy in 1949. I was seven years old, and it made a big impression on me. I remember the music and the man. He was a friend of my father's so I was introduced to him, and he was just this huge guy, with a very gentle spirit and a fantastic guitar player... I always gravitated towards blues music for whatever reason. By the time I was in my early teens, I was a blues fanatic. I never thought that I would ever play an instrument or be a professional player but, I mean, I loved the music. When I got a guitar, that was it. Solo is, for me, where the art belongs. If you could pull it off solo, you were really doing it."

"I eventually began to buy records and become aware of this music that was so compelling to me. During the '50s I was a teenager and beginning to form my tastes and blues was at the forefront. I was into artists like Sonny Terry and Brownie McGee and Josh White, Big Bill Broonzy, of course, Leon Bibb and Lead Belly. When rock and roll hit the scene in the mid-'50s I liked artists like Bo Diddly and Chuck Berry, Little Richard, Eddie Cochran, Gene Vincent and the Blue Cats. All of these fantastic players that were, you know, into the music... It was—for the first time you were hearing black and white artists together and, I don't know, I was just very excited by the music and the way it made me feel."

== Career ==
Hammond sang and played in a passionate barrelhouse style and moved easily between acoustic and electric guitars, primarily playing acoustic guitars, favoring a steel-bodied National Reso-Phonic Guitar which was older than he was. In 1963, he made his debut recording on Vanguard Records. The album, John Hammond, was one of the first blues albums by a white artist during the folk boom years along with one by Koerner, Ray & Glover both of which were preceded by Dave Van Ronk.

In July 1963, he played at the Newport Folk Festival and was featured in the blues workshop there alongside John Lee Hooker, Mississippi John Hurt, Dave Van Ronk, and Sonny Terry. He returned there in July, 1964 as part of a line up that included Muddy Waters, Skip James, Mississippi John Hurt, Sleepy John Estes, Son House, Reverend Robert Wilkins, and Mississippi Fred McDowell.

Later in his career, he received critical acclaim having modest commercial success. John Lee Hooker, Roosevelt Sykes, Duane Allman, Rory Gallagher, Willy Deville, Robbie Robertson, Mike Bloomfield, and Charlie Musselwhite played on his records.

Hammond was the only artist who had both Eric Clapton and Jimi Hendrix in his band at the same time. His longtime booking agent, Mike Kappus, said of an engagement at The Gaslight Cafe in Greenwich Village, Manhattan in 1968, "When Jimi was performing as Jimi James and was suddenly out of work in New York, John lined up a gig with his band, inviting Jimi to join them. During the week-long stint, Chas Chandler (of the Animals fame), was (at the show and being impressed), brought Jimi to London where his career was launched. Jimi stopped back to see John after his first U.S. tour (opening for The Monkees) and once again sat in with John. Eric Clapton was also in NYC at that time, having just finished a U.S. tour with Cream and he too sat in for the rest of the gig.... John had both Jimi and Eric in his band that week".

According to Kappus, "John figured prominently with The Band connecting with Bob Dylan after Bob visited one of John’s recording sessions, which included Levon (Helm) and The Hawks backing John. After touring with Dylan they went on to become The Band." after a famed and tumultuous world tour.

In 1970, he created the soundtrack for the film Little Big Man starring Dustin Hoffman which was nominated by the British Academy of Film and Television Arts, (the BAFTAs), for their Award for Best Original Music, formerly known as the Anthony Asquith Award for Film Music. In 1971, two Chuck Berry tunes, "Maybellene" and "No Money Down", tracks from his first two albums, made it onto the soundtrack of the movie Two-Lane Blacktop.

In 1985, he earned a Grammy Award for his performance on the album, Blues Explosion, and was nominated for six more between 1993 and 2006. In the early 1990s, he began recording for the Pointblank Records label. His album Got Love If You Want It with his cover of the Slim Harpo title track was a 1993 Grammy nominee.

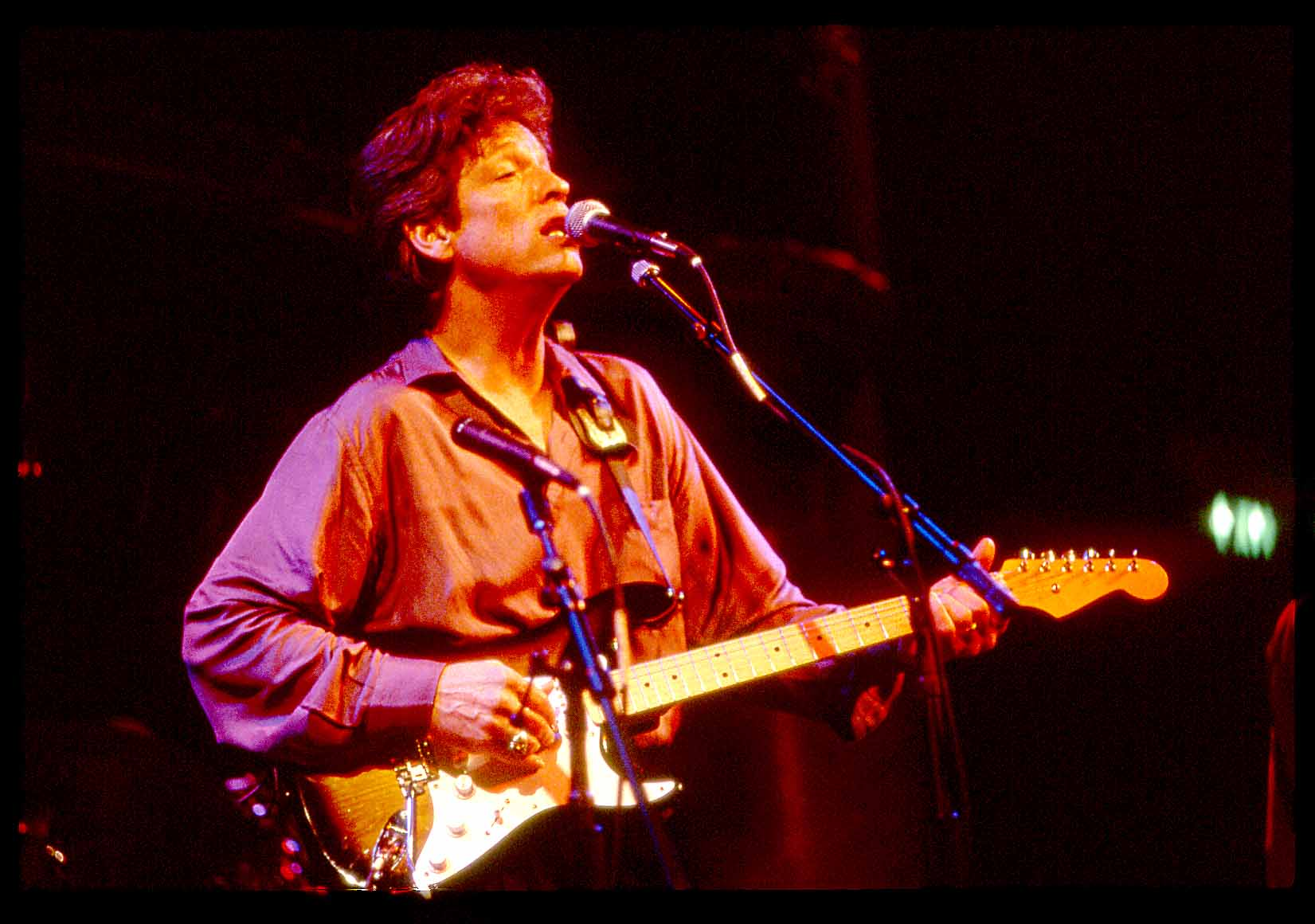
Hammond during the 1980s

Hammond hosted the 1991 Bravo UK television documentary The Search for Robert Johnson, detailing the life of the legendary Delta bluesman. He had a longstanding friendship with songwriter Tom Waits and performed Waits' songs on occasion. In 2001, he released Wicked Grin, an album consisting of Waits' compositions and the traditional spiritual, "I Know I've Been Changed". Waits played guitar and sang backing vocals on the album and was also its producer. In 2001, he was back in the movies with Tom Waits' song "Get Behind the Mule" for the soundtrack of the film, The Last Castle.

In 2003, his album Ready for Love was released which David Hidalgo of Los Lobos produced. Also in 2003, the Blues Foundation voted him as the Blues Music Award winner (formerly the W.C. Handy Award) for Best Acoustic Blues Artist, which is among the highest honors a blues artist can get.

His 2009 album, Rough & Tough, was nominated for the Grammy Award for Best Traditional Blues Album in 2010. In 2011, he was the Blues Music Award winner for Acoustic Artist of the Year and was inducted into the Blues Hall of Fame. He was honored with two awards at the Hall of Fame induction and awards ceremony in Memphis, in 2015, for Best Acoustic Blues Album for "Timeless" and for Best Acoustic Blues Artist.

== Personal life and death ==
Hammond and his third wife, Marla married in 1993. His first wife, Dana McDevitt, and he were married in 1967. He married his second wife, Peggy Spoerri, in 1981.

John Hammond died from cardiac arrest at a hospital in Jersey City, New Jersey, on February 28, 2026, at 83. He was survived by his wife; his son, Paul, from his first marriage; a daughter, Amy, from his second marriage; his brother, Jason and his stepsister, Rosita Sarnoff.

== Discography ==
=== Studio Albums ===
- 1963 John Hammond (Vanguard Records)
- 1964 Big City Blues (Vanguard) – includes the first blues-rock cover of Willie Dixon's "Back Door Man"
- 1965 So Many Roads (Vanguard)
- 1965 Country Blues (Vanguard)
- 1967 Mirrors (Vanguard) – reissued on Real Gone Music in 2016
- 1967 I Can Tell (Atlantic Records)
- 1968 Sooner or Later (Atlantic) – reissued on Water Music in 2002
- 1969 Southern Fried (Atlantic) – reissued on Water Music in 2002
- 1971 Source Point (Columbia Records)
- 1971 Little Big Man / Original Soundtrack (Columbia) – Hammond recorded all musical tracks
- 1972 I'm Satisfied (Columbia)
- 1973 Triumvirate – with Mike Bloomfield and Dr. John (Columbia)
- 1975 Can't Beat the Kid (Capricorn Records) – reissued on PolyGram in 1997
- 1976 John Hammond: Solo (Vanguard)
- 1978 Footwork (Vanguard)
- 1979 Hot Tracks – with The Nighthawks (Vanguard)
- 1980 Mileage (Rounder Records)
- 1982 Frogs for Snakes (Rounder)
- 1988 Nobody but You (Flying Fish Records) – reissued on Pointblank Records/Virgin Records in 1996
- 1992 Got Love if You Want It (Pointblank/Virgin)
- 1994 Trouble No More (Pointblank/Virgin) – Grammy nominee
- 1996 Found True Love (Pointblank/Virgin) – Grammy nominee
- 1998 Long As I Have You (Pointblank/Virgin) – Grammy nominee
- 2001 Wicked Grin (Pointblank/Virgin) – Blues Music Award winner for Best Acoustic Album
- 2003 Ready for Love (Back Porch Records/Virgin)
- 2005 In Your Arms Again (Back Porch/Virgin) – Grammy nominee
- 2007 Push Comes to Shove (Back Porch/Narada)
- 2009 Rough & Tough (Chesky Records)

=== Live Albums ===
- 1983 John Hammond Live (Rounder)
- 2006 Live in Greece [rec. 1983] (Dynamic/MSI)
- 2014 Timeless [live] (Palmetto Records)
- 2024 Birthday Blues Bash (New Shot Records) – recorded in Italy, November 13, 2001, on his 59th birthday.
- 2024 Bear's Sonic Journals: You're Doin' Fine (Blues at the Boarding House) (Owsley Stanley Foundation) – 3-CD; recorded June 2–3, 1973.

=== Single ===
- 2019 "You Know That's Cold" b/w "Come To Find Out" [Translucent Blue 7"] (Need To Know Records)

=== Compilation Albums ===
- 1970 The Best of John Hammond (Vanguard)
- 1984 Spoonful (Edsel)
- 1993 You Can't Judge a Book by the Cover (Vanguard) – Grammy nominee
- 2000 The Best of the Vanguard Years (Vanguard)
- 2003 At the Crossroads: The Blues of Robert Johnson (Vanguard)
