= Frostbite (album) =

Studio album by Albert Collins
- Released: 1980
- Studio: Curtom, Chicago, Illinois
- Genre: Blues
- Length: 41:10
- Label: Alligator
- Producer: Bruce Iglauer, Dick Shurman, Casey Jones

Albert Collins chronology
Ice Pickin' (1978)	Frostbite (1980)	Frozen Alive! (1981)

Professional ratings
Review scores
Source	Rating
AllMusic	3/5 stars
MusicHound Blues: The Essential Album Guide	5/5 stars
The Penguin Guide to Blues Recordings	3/4 stars
The Rolling Stone Album Guide	3.5/5 stars

Frostbite is a studio album by Albert Collins, released in 1980 on Alligator Records.

== Track listing ==
1. "If You Love Me Like You Say" (Little Johnny Taylor) – 4:07
2. "Blue Monday Hangover" (Gilbert Caple, Deadric Malone) – 5:35
3. "I Got a Problem" (Gene Barge, Jesse Anderson) – 4:34
4. "Highway Is Like a Woman" (Percy Mayfield, Joe James) – 4:34
5. "Brick" (Johnnie Morrisette) – 4:35
6. "Don't Go Reaching Across My Plate" (Oscar Wills) – 4:34
7. "Give Me My Blues" (Albert Collins) – 4:13
8. "Snowed In" (Albert Collins) – 9:12

== Personnel ==
- Albert Collins - guitar, vocals
- Paul Howard - trumpet
- Bill McFarland - trombone
- Henri Ford - baritone saxophone
- A.C. Reed - saxophone
- Allen Batts - keyboards
- Marvin Jackson - guitar
- Johnny Gayden - bass
- Casey Jones - drums

Technical

- Fred Breitberg - engineer
- Jim Matusik - photography
