= I'm John Lee Hooker =

Compilation album by John Lee Hooker
- Released: August 1959
- Recorded: 1955–1959
- Studio: Chicago
- Genre: Blues
- Length: 32:25
- Label: Vee-Jay
- Producer: Calvin Carter; Jimmy Bracken

I'm John Lee Hooker is an album by blues musician John Lee Hooker. Released by Vee-Jay Records in 1959, it compiles seven songs originally released as singles between 1955 and 1958 along with five new tracks recorded in 1959.

== Reception ==
Professional ratings
Review scores
Source	Rating
AllMusic	4.5/5 stars
The Penguin Guide to Blues Recordings	2.5/4 stars
The Virgin Encyclopedia of The Blues	4/5 stars

The Penguin Guide to Blues Recordings wrote: "When Hooker's Vee-Jay sides first appeared, as singles, they were heartening indications that honest and ungimmicky blues were still being made ... Taken at a draught, decades later they are a little less compelling. Putting Hooker with an efficient band was presumably intended to relieve him of rhythmic chores and give him room to flex vocal or instrumental muscle, but he gains little from it; he is always his most interesting rhythm provider."

AllMusic reviewer Lindsay Planer stated: "I'm John Lee Hooker was first issued in 1959 during his tenure with Vee Jay and is "the Hook" in his element as well as prime. ... Time has, if anything, only reinforced the significance of the album. It belongs in every blues enthusiast's collection without reservation."

== Track listing ==
All compositions credited to John Lee Hooker.

1. "Dimples" – 2:14
2. "Hobo Blues" – 2:48
3. "I'm So Excited" – 2:53
4. "I Love You Honey" – 2:33
5. "Boogie Chillun" – 2:35
6. "Little Wheel" – 2:34
7. "I'm in the Mood" – 2:42
8. "Maudie" – 2:17
9. "Crawlin' Kingsnake" – 2:41
10. "Every Night" – 2:58
11. "Time Is Marching" – 3:01
12. "Baby Lee" – 2:48
- Recorded in Chicago on October 19, 1955 (track 11), March 27, 1956 (tracks 1, 10 & 12), March 1, 1957 (track 3), June 23, 1957 (track 6), June 10, 1958 (track 4) and January 22, 1959 (tracks 2, 5 & 7–9)

== Personnel ==
- John Lee Hooker – guitar, vocals
- Jimmy Reed – harmonica (track 11)
- Eddie Taylor – guitar (tracks 1, 3, 6–8 & 10–12)
- Frankie Bradford (track 6), Joe Hunter (track 4) – piano
- Everett McCrary (tracks 4 & 6), George Washington (track 1 & 10–12), Quinn Wilson (track 3) – bass
- Richard Johnson (tracks 4 & 6), Earl Phillips (track 7), Tom Whitehead (tracks 1, 3 & 10–12) – drums
