= Friday the 13th (2009 soundtrack) =

2009 soundtrack albums

Friday the 13th (Music from the Motion Picture)

Soundtrack album by various artists
- Released: February 13, 2009
- Genre: Soundtrack
- Length: 44:28
- Label: New Line

Friday the 13th (Expanded Score from the Motion Picture)

Film score by Steve Jablonsky
- Released: June 11, 2009
- Recorded: 2008–2009
- Genre: Film score
- Length: 44:28
- Label: New Line
- Producer: Steve Jablonsky

Steve Jablonsky chronology
The Sims 3 (2009)	Friday the 13th (2009)	Transformers: Revenge of the Fallen (2009)

Friday the 13th is a 2009 slasher film directed by Marcus Nispel which is a reboot and the twelfth installment overall in the Friday the 13th franchise. Two soundtrack albums were released for the film: Friday the 13th (Music from the Motion Picture) featuring songs heard in the film released on February 13, 2009, under the New Line Records label, while Friday the 13th (Expanded Score from the Motion Picture) consisting of the score composed by Steve Jablonsky, released on June 11, 2009.

== Background and development ==
The producers Andrew Form and Brad Fuller acknowledged the iconic status of the music used in the first four Friday the 13th films and immediately insisted studio to acquire the licensing rights to the original music composed by Harry Manfredini. Instead of using Manfredini's score in entirety, they wanted someone to compose a score that would be reminiscent of the earlier films while also providing an apt atmosphere for the reboot.

One of the producers, Michael Bay recommended Steve Jablonsky to compose the score as he previously worked with him in The Island (2005) and Transformers (2007). Nispel also contacted him as he also worked with him on the 2003 remake of The Texas Chain Saw Massacre. He told Jablonsky that he wanted something that he could "whistle when [he] left the theater" but was subtle enough that it would not immediately register while watching the film. Nispel said that he could not believe that while watching the film, it felt like John Williams sitting next to the composer with London Symphony Orchestra.

== Reception ==
Michael Gingold of Fangoria was critical of the decision to accompany Jason's appearances with "aural blasts that aren’t nearly subtle enough to be called stingers, and instead suggest the musical equivalent of a train hitting a stalled car". He found Jablonsky's work being inferior to Manfredini's, while also noting on the iconic "ki, ki, ki, ma, ma, ma" sound effect was sparingly used in the film, in an attempt to make it distinctive from the earlier instalments. Rob Nelson of Variety wrote "Steve Jablonsky‘s score also is quicker than Manfredini’s, in keeping with the killer’s curiously aerobic agility."

Nathan Lee of The New York Times noted it to be ineffective.

== Track listing ==
Friday the 13th (Music from the Motion Picture)
No.	Title	Artist(s)	Length
1.	"Sister Christian"	Night Ranger	5:02
2.	"Freak Your Loneliness"	The Bumblebeez	3:19
3.	"Get Em Up"	Classic	2:00
4.	"Post Millennium Extinction Blues"	Living Things	3:39
5.	"She Does"	Locksley	1:53
6.	"My Favourite Book"	Stars	4:04
7.	"Tick Tick Boom"	The Hives	3:36
8.	"Doin' Things"	Three A.M.	3:32
9.	"I Like It, I Love It"	Lyrics Born	3:44
10.	"Night Train"	The Kills	3:04
11.	"No Way to Stop It"	Jimmy Gresham	3:09
12.	"Shove It"	Santigold	3:45
13.	"Friday The 13th Opening Title"	Steve Jablonsky	3:41
Total length:			44:28

Friday the 13th (Expanded Score from the Motion Picture)
No.	Title	Length
1.	"Friday The 13th - Opening Title"	3:42
2.	"Old Tales Of Camp Blood / Jasons Lullaby"	1:02
3.	"Worrying Whitney"	0:24
4.	"Kill Wade / The Vorhees House"	2:03
5.	"Sleeping Ke-Bag"	1:11
6.	"Chasing Whitney"	2:42
7.	"Barn Kill / The Hockey Mask"	1:33
8.	"Hiding In Camp Blood"	1:20
9.	"Warn My Friends"	0:50
10.	"Whitney In Chains / Jasons Wrath"	3:33
11.	"Run Whitney Run"	1:48
12.	"Chewie Tunes Out"	1:37
13.	"Back Axe"	1:02
14.	"Curtains For Bree"	0:32
15.	"Escape From The House"	0:31
16.	"Lost In The Woods"	0:48
17.	"Trents Truck Of Terror"	1:44
18.	"Finding Whitney"	1:07
19.	"Jenna Is Jabbed"	0:28
20.	"Bus Shelter"	1:00
21.	"Big Fight"	0:37
22.	"Jason In Chains"	1:06
23.	"Say Hello To Mommy!"	2:34
24.	"End Credits"	5:41
25.	"Murder Montage"	2:14
26.	"Jasons Theme"	0:07
27.	"SJ-Montage"	8:49
Total length:		50:05

== Charts ==
Chart (2009)	Peak position
US Soundtrack Albums (Billboard)	18

== Personnel ==
Credits adapted from liner notes:

- Music composer and producer – Steve Jablonsky
- Original Friday the 13th themes – Harry Manfredini
- Additional music – Clay Duncan, Jed Smith, Pieter A. Schlosser
- Technical score engineer – Doug Han Clow
- Recording and mixing – Jeffrey Biggers
- Music editor – Del Spiva, Jennifer Nash
