= The New Jimmy Reed Album =

Studio album by Jimmy Reed
- Released: 1967
- Recorded: November 4 & 8, 1966
- Studio: Chicago, IL
- Genre: Blues
- Length: 31:18
- Label: BluesWay; BL/BLS 6004
- Producer: Al Smith

Jimmy Reed chronology
Jimmy Reed at Soul City (1964)	The New Jimmy Reed Album (1967)	Soulin' (1967)

The New Jimmy Reed Album is an album by blues musician Jimmy Reed released by the BluesWay label in 1967.

== Reception ==
Professional ratings
Review scores
Source	Rating
AllMusic	2.5/5 stars

AllMusic reviewer Stephen Thomas Erlewine stated the album was: "bogged down by a production that tries to move Reed into the blues-rock era. Consequently, the album is primarily of interest to completists, since even hardcore Reed fans may find the production disconcerting".

== Track listing ==
All compositions credited to Jimmy Reed except where noted

1. "Big Boss Man" (Luther Dixon, Al Smith) – 2:43
2. "I Wanna Know" (Johnnie Mae Smith) – 2:48
3. "Got Nowhere to Go" (Jimmy Reed, Al Smith) – 2:30
4. "Two Ways to Skin a Cat" (Al Smith) – 2:35
5. "Heartaches and Trouble" – 2:15
6. "Baby What You Want Me to Do" – 2:20
7. "Honey I'll Make Two" (Johnnie Mae Smith) – 2:18
8. "You Don't Have to Go" – 3:14
9. "Don't Play Me Cheap" (Al Smith) – 2:20
10. "Two Sides to Every Story" (Al Smith) – 2:30
11. "I'm Just Trying to Cop a Plea" (Mary Lee Reed) – 2:30
12. "Two Heads Better Than One" (Al Smith) – 3:15

== Personnel ==
- Jimmy Reed – guitar, vocals, harmonica
- William "Lefty" Bates – guitar
- Jimmy Gresham – bass
- Al Duncan – drums
