= Truckin' with Albert Collins =

Studio album by Albert Collins
- Released: 1969
- Recorded: 1962, 1963, 1965
- Studio: Gold Star (Houston, Texas)
- Genre: Blues
- Label: Blue Thumb
- Producer: Bill Hall

Albert Collins chronology
Alive and Cool (1969)	Truckin' with Albert Collins (1969)	There's Gotta Be a Change (1971)

Truckin' with Albert Collins is an album by the American musician Albert Collins, released in 1969. It was originally released as The Cool Sounds of Albert Collins, in 1965. It was reissued by MCA Records in 1991.

== Production ==
Produced by Bill Hall, the album was recorded at Gold Star Studios, in Houston, Texas. Nine of the tracks, recorded in 1962 and 1963, had already been released as singles; "Icy Blue", "Kool Aide", and "Shiver 'n Shake" date to April 1965 sessions. The initial Blue Thumb release was channeled for stereo sound. Many of the tracks employ a horn section. Collins used open D-minor and F-minor tunings and played without a pick. He sings on "Dyin' Flu", perhaps his first recorded vocal performance.

== Critical reception ==
Professional ratings
Review scores
Source	Rating
AllMusic	4.5/5 stars
The Grove Press Guide to the Blues on CD	4.5/5 stars
MusicHound Blues: The Essential Album Guide	3.5/5 stars
The Penguin Guide to Blues Recordings	3/4 stars
The Rolling Stone Album Guide	5/5 stars
The Virgin Encyclopedia of the Blues	3/5 stars

The Detroit Free Press opined that "the dynamic levels, moods, metronomic speeds, and rhythms ... are so very similar that it's practically impossible to tell one selection from another." The Province said that Collins has "striven for an instrumental approach that, while acknowledging the profound influence of [T-Bone] Walker and [Albert] King, is an immediately recognizable, wholly personable mode of expression." The Edmonton Journal praised the "hard-drivin, fast-rollin contemporary blues... Easily the best modern interpreter of old-style 'truckin'' blues."

The San Francisco Examiner stated that the 1991 reissue "restores a crucial classic of the literature." AllMusic wrote that "his trademark sound is in place—his leads are stinging, piercing and direct." The Rolling Stone Album Guide noted the "eerie tone clusters."

== Track listing ==
No.	Title	Length
1.	"Frosty"	2:51
2.	"Hot 'n Cold"	3:00
3.	"Frost Bite"	2:04
4.	"Tremble"	2:28
5.	"Thaw-Out"	2:36
6.	"Dyin' Flu"	3:12
7.	"Don't Lose Your Cool"	2:10
8.	"Backstroke"	2:43
9.	"Kool Aide"	2:41
10.	"Shiver 'n Shake"	2:06
11.	"Icy Blue"	2:47
12.	"Sno-Cone II"	2:35
