= Casey Jones (musician) =

American drummer

- Born: July 26, 1939; Nitta Yuma, Mississippi, U.S.
- Died: May 3, 2017 (aged 77) Chicago, Illinois, U.S.
- Genre: Blues
- Instrument: Drums
- Years active: 1950s–2017
- Label: Airwax Records

Casey Jones (July 26, 1939 – May 3, 2017) was an American drummer who recorded with blues artists such as Albert Collins, appearing on his Frostbite and Ice Pickin' albums and Johnny Winter appearing on Winters Serious Business, Guitar Slinger, True to the Blues: The Johnny Winter Story albums. He is also a singer and record producer.

== Background ==
He was born in Nitta Yuma, Mississippi, on July 26, 1939. He was raised in Greenville. In 1956 he moved to Chicago to live with his sister. It was here that his sister and her husband bought him his first drum set. He had his first gig in 1956 from which he made $5.

In 1961 he married Bernice who had come to hear his group play. Prior to being married by the minister they had attempted to get married by a priest who refused to marry them because he said they wouldn't last six months as Bernice was white and Casey was black. Casey and Bernice raised their family in Morgan Park with a household filled with cats, dogs, fish and birds. He was also fond of big dogs and in particular a huge gray Great Dane called Soldier.

Friends of Casey will remember him through his music and his cheery disposition.

Jones also had an occasional day job driving a bus.

== Career ==
In the early 1960s he recorded with Earl Hooker, A.C. Reed, McKinley Mitchell, and Muddy Waters. As a session drummer he has worked with artists such as Lou Rawls, Otis Rush, Muddy Waters and Johnny Winter. For six years he was a member of Albert Collins's band as his drummer. According to Maureen O'Donnell of the Chicago Sun Times and Living Blues contributor Justin O'Brien, Jones was a talented singer, an excellent R&B singer.

After his time with Albert Collins, Jones went to concentrate on his singing and fronting his own band. In 1983, he had the album Still Kickin' released on his own Airwax label. In 1987, another album Solid Blues was released on the Rooster Blues label. Between 1993 and 1995, he had two more albums released - The Crowd Pleaser and I-94 On My Way to Chicago. Both were released on Airwax.

== Death ==
Jones was diagnosed with prostate cancer and died on May 3, 2017, in Chicago. In addition to his wife Bernice and three children, he was survived by four sisters.

== Discography ==
=== Solo ===
- Casey Jones - Still Kickin'
- Casey Jones - Solid Blue
- Casey Jones - The Crowd Pleaser
- Casey Jones = I-94 On My Way to Chicago

=== Appearances (selective) ===
- Albert Collins - Frostbite
- Lonnie Brooks - Deluxe Edition
- Johnny Winter - Guitar Slinger
