= Iceman (Albert Collins album) =

Studio album by Albert Collins
- Released: March 1991
- Recorded: Memphis Sound Productions, Memphis, Tennessee, United States and The Manor Studio, Shipton-on-Cherwell, England.
- Genre: Blues
- Length: 43:28
- Label: Virgin, Pointblank
- Producer: Jim Gaines, Albert Collins

Albert Collins chronology
Jazzvisions: Jump the Blues Away (1989)	Iceman (1991)	Live '92/'93 (1995)

Professional ratings
Review scores
Source	Rating
AllMusic	2.5/5 stars
The Penguin Guide to Blues Recordings	2.5/4 stars
Q	2/5 stars

Iceman is the tenth studio album by Albert Collins, released in 1991 by Virgin Records under the sub-label Pointblank. It was his last studio album before his death from lung cancer, in 1993.

The album received mixed reviews, with Lloyd Bradley in Q writing that "the songs are more interesting than what [Collins] does with them (..) as he operates more like a sideman than the star of the show".

== Track listing ==
All songs written by Albert Collins.

No.	Title	Length
1.	"Mr. Collins, Mr. Collins"	5:11
2.	"Iceman"	5:04
3.	"Don't Mistake Kindness for Weakness"	6:12
4.	"Travellin' South"	3:06
5.	"Put the Shoe on the Other Foot"	5:30
6.	"I'm Beginning to Wonder"	4:12
7.	"Head Rag"	3:54
8.	"The Hawk"	2:38
9.	"Blues for Gabe"	3:43
10.	"Mr. Collins, Mr. Collins (Reprise)"	3:54

== Personnel ==
Musicians

- Albert Collins - guitar, vocals
- Johnny B. Gayden - bass
- Soko Richardson - drums, percussion
- Eddie Harsch - keyboards
- Charles Hodges - organ
- Debbie Davies, Jack Holder, Mabon "Teenie" Hodges - rhythm guitar
- Debbie Jamison, Vicki Loveland - backing vocals
- The Uptown Horns:
  - Crispin Cioe - alto saxophone, baritone saxophone
  - Arno Hecht - tenor saxophone
  - Bob Funk - trombone
  - Paul "Hollywood" Litteral - trumpet

Technical

- Albert Collins, Jim Gaines - co-producers
- The Uptown Horns - horn arrangement
- Ian Taylor - engineering
- Greg Archilla - engineering, mixing
- Hilton Weinberg - executive producer
- Joel Kerr, Tony Noe - mastering
- Dan Pfeifer - assistant mixing
- Icon - design, art direction
- John Stoddart - photography
