= Big Boss Man (Jimmy Reed album) =

Studio album by Jimmy Reed
- Released: 1968
- Recorded: 1968
- Studio: Chicago, IL
- Genre: Blues
- Length: 31:18
- Label: BluesWay; BL/BLS 6015
- Producer: Al Smith

Jimmy Reed chronology
Soulin' (1967)	Big Boss Man (1968)	Down in Virginia (1969)

Big Boss Man is an album by blues musician Jimmy Reed released by the BluesWay label in 1968.

== Reception ==
Professional ratings
Review scores
Source	Rating
AllMusic	2/5 stars

AllMusic reviewer Cub Koda stated: "Reed was in pretty sad shape by this time in his life and the monotonous approach to these songs (tunes constantly fade in and out as if only this much of the performance was salvageable) gives these recordings a real assembly line quality that's most unsettling".

== Track listing ==
All compositions credited to Al Smith except where noted

1. "Give Up and Let Me Go" – 2:48
2. "I'm Leavin'" (Mary Lee Reed) – 2:40
3. "Shame, Shame, Shame" (Jimmy Reed) – 2:41
4. "Run Here to Me Baby" (Mary Lee Reed) – 2:45
5. "Life Is Funny" – 2:40
6. "Two in One Blue" (Al Smith, James Oden) – 2:42
7. "My Baby Told Me" (Mary Lee Reed) – 2:40
8. "Five Years of Good Lovin'" – 2:50
9. "When Two People in Love" – 2:40
10. "I've Got to Keep on Rollin'" – 2:20
11. "When I Woke Up This Morning" – 2:25

== Personnel ==
- Jimmy Reed – guitar, vocals, harmonica
- Wayne Bennett – lead guitar
- William "Lefty" Bates – rhythm guitar
- Eddie Taylor, Phil Upchurch – bass
- Jimmy Tillman – drums
