= Down in Virginia =

Studio album by Jimmy Reed
- Released: 1969
- Recorded: 1967–69
- Studio: Chicago, IL
- Genre: Blues
- Length: 28:29
- Label: BluesWay; BL/BLS 6024
- Producer: Al Smith

Jimmy Reed chronology
Big Boss Man (1968)	Down in Virginia (1969)	As Jimmy Is (1970)

Down in Virginia is an album by blues musician Jimmy Reed released by the BluesWay label in 1969.

== Reception ==
Professional ratings
Review scores
Source	Rating
AllMusic	2/5 stars

AllMusic reviewer Cub Koda stated: "Reed was in pretty sad shape by this time in his life and the monotonous approach to these songs (tunes constantly fade in and out as if only this much of the performance was salvageable) gives these recordings a real assembly line quality that's most unsettling".

Bob Dylan paid homage to the album by integrating its title into a lyric in his tribute song "Goodbye Jimmy Reed" ("Can't you hear me calling from down in Virginia?").

== Track listing ==
All compositions credited to Al Smith except where noted

1. "Sugar, Sugar Woman" (Al Smith, O. D. Robinson) – 2:35
2. "Don't Light My Fire" – 2:35
3. "Slow Walking Mama" (Al Smith, Louis Smith) – 2:40
4. "Jump and Shout" (Mary Lee Reed) – 2:30
5. "Down In Virginia" (Mary Lee Reed) – 2:35
6. "Check Yourself" (Mary Lee Reed) – 2:35
7. "I Shot an Arrow to the Sky" (Mary Lee Reed) – 2:37
8. "Ghetto Woman Blues" – 2:25
9. "Big Boss Lady" – 2:32
10. "I Need You So" (Mary Lee Reed) – 2:40
11. "The Judge Should Know" (Al Smith, Louis Smith) – 2:45

== Personnel ==
- Jimmy Reed – guitar, vocals, harmonica
- Wayne Bennett – guitar
- Eddie Taylor – guitar, bass
- Phil Upchurch – bass
- Al Duncan – drums
