= Back Porch Records =

- Parent company: Universal Music Group
- Founded: 1997
- Founder: Ken Peterson; John Wooler
- Distributor(s): Capitol Music Group
- Genre: Americana, roots rock
- Country of origin: United States
- Location: Milwaukee, Wisconsin

Back Porch Records was an Americana/roots rock label owned by Universal Music Group.

The label was started in 1997 as joint venture between Virgin Records and Milwaukee-based Narada Productions. The label's initial releases, including the I-10 Chronicles compilations, were produced by Virgin Records executives Ken Peterson and John Wooler. Roughly three years after launch, Peterson and Wooler left Virgin Records and the label became a full-time concern for Narada.

The Milwaukee-based label was run by Narada president Wesley Van Linda, who appointed Rich Denhart (VP of A&R) and Mike Bailey (Label Manager/A&R) to head Back Porch. In 2005, David Neidhart succeeded the retiring Van Linda as head of Narada Productions and, along with Denhart and Bailey, oversaw albums by the Subdudes, Alejandro Escovedo, Over the Rhine, The Neville Brothers, John Hammond, Frank Black, Charlie Sexton, Shannon McNally, and Carrie Rodriguez.

In 2006, EMI closed the Narada offices in Milwaukee. Some Back Porch employees remained with EMI and became part of the Blue Note Label Group (Blue Note Records, Manhattan Records, Narada Productions, Higher Octave Music, Back Porch Records) in New York City headed by Bruce Lundvall and Ian Ralfini. Ralfini and Mike Bailey consolidated the rosters of Manhattan and Back Porch and released albums by Emerson Hart, Rosanne Cash, Alejandro Escovedo, Van Morrison, and Carrie Rodriguez.

In 2009, Mike Bailey, who remained the labels one constant throughout its duration, left EMI. Back Porch is a dormant imprint. The catalog is part of EMI Music.
