= Travelin' (John Lee Hooker album) =

Studio album by John Lee Hooker
- Released: 1960
- Recorded: March 1, 1960
- Studio: Chicago
- Genre: Blues
- Length: 30:58
- Label: Vee-Jay

Travelin' is an album by blues musician John Lee Hooker, recorded in 1960, which Vee-Jay Records released in the same year.

== Reception ==
Professional ratings
Review scores
Source	Rating
The Penguin Guide to Blues Recordings	2.5/4 stars
The New Rolling Stone Record Guide	3/5 stars
The Virgin Encyclopedia of The Blues	4/5 stars
DownBeat	4/5 stars

The Penguin Guide to Blues Recordings wrote that "Travelin' "was the first of Hooker's Vee-Jay albums to be recorded at a single session. Cut from the same cloth, the performances have little variety in texture and not much in tempo."

Pete Welding assigned the album 4 stars in his DownBeat review. He wrote,

"He is one of the most powerful blues performers, yet there is not a great deal of originality or real poetry in his lyrics. In the hands of a lesser artist, one feels that they would hardly come across, but the power of Hooker is such that he can invest them with a genuine conviction and seriousness that makes them believable. The dark, brooding, inconsolable quality of his voice and the intensity of his delivery further add to this effect".

== Track listing ==
All compositions credited to John Lee Hooker

1. "No Shoes" – 2:10
2. "I Wanna Walk" – 2:15
3. "Canal Street Blues" – 2:30
4. "Run On" – 2:10
5. "I'm a Stranger" – 2:35
6. "Whiskey and Wimmen" – 2:10
7. "Solid Sender" – 2:30
8. "Sunny Land" – 2:15
9. "Goin' to California" – 2:20
10. "I Can't Believe" – 2:37
11. "I'll Know Tonight" – 2:35
12. "Dusty Road" – 2:09

== Personnel ==
- John Lee Hooker – guitar, vocals
- William "Lefty" Bates – guitar
- Sylvester Hickman – bass
- Jimmy Turner – drums
