= Lefty Bates =

American Chicago blues guitarist

- Born: William H. Bates; March 9, 1920; Leighton, Alabama, United States
- Died: April 7, 2007 (aged 87) Chicago, Illinois, United States
- Genres: Chicago blues
- Instrument: Guitar
- Years active: Mid 1930s – early 1980s
- Labels: RCA, Vee-Jay, various

Lefty Bates (March 9, 1920 – April 7, 2007) was an American Chicago blues guitarist. He led the Lefty Bates Combo and worked with the El Dorados, the Flamingos, Jimmy Reed, John Lee Hooker, Buddy Guy, Etta James, the Aristo-Kats, the Hi-De-Ho Boys, the Moroccos, and the Impressions. A regular on the Chicago blues scene, his major work was as a session musician on numerous recordings in the 1950s and 1960s.

Bates was married to the locally well-known club dancer Mary Cole Bates, who died in 2001.

== Biography ==
He was born William H. Bates in Leighton, Alabama. He acquired his nickname from his left-handed guitar playing. He was raised in St. Louis, Missouri, and attended Vashon High School, where was a founder of the Hi-De-Ho Boys. In 1936, they relocated to Chicago, recorded for Decca Records and played in clubs. After serving in the military in World War II, Bates joined the Aristo-Kats, who recorded for RCA Victor.

Bates formed an ensemble with Quinn Wilson, and they played locally through most of the 1950s. Their few recordings were issued by United, Boxer, Mad and Apex Records, under Bates's name. Most of his paid work came from regular performances in clubs and as a session musician, notably as a rhythm guitarist with Jimmy Reed and Buddy Guy. He undertook other work with Larry Birdsong and Honey Brown. His versatility led to employment as part of the studio band for Vee-Jay Records, with Red Holloway and Vernel Fournier, among others. Most of the musicians there had earlier worked for Chance Records, backing Jimmy Reed and the Spaniels. Vee-Jay's financial strength helped them survive, and the studio band was expected to back diverse musicians on an ad hoc basis, including R&B, blues, jazz and doo-wop artists. In 1955, The El Dorados found national success with "At My Front Door", on which Bates played guitar, and which peaked at number one on the Billboard R&B chart.

From 1955, Bates worked in a similar manner with another Chicago-based record label, Club 51, where he had the luxury of leading the Lefty Bates Orchestra. At Club 51 he backed the Five Buddies and Sunnyland Slim. In 1957, Bates and Earl Hooker backed the singer Arbee Stidham on his recording of "Look Me Straight in the Eye".

In 1959, Bates played with Reed on his recording of "Baby What You Want Me to Do". In March 1960, he was part of the backing trio for John Lee Hooker on his album Travelin'. In 1961, he performed on Hooker's The Folk Lore of John Lee Hooker and with Jimmy Reed on the album Jimmy Reed at Carnegie Hall and played on Reed's recording of "Big Boss Man".

Bates died of arteriosclerosis in Chicago in April 2007, aged 87.

== Discography ==
With John Lee Hooker

- Travelin' (Vee-Jay, 1960)
- The Folk Lore of John Lee Hooker (Vee-Jay, 1961)

'With Jimmy Reed

- Jimmy Reed at Carnegie Hall (Vee-Jay, 1961)
- Jimmy Reed Plays 12 String Guitar Blues (Vee-Jay, 1963)
- The New Jimmy Reed Album (BluesWay, 1967)
- Soulin' (BluesWay, 1967)
- Big Boss Man (BluesWay, 1968)

== See also ==
- List of Chicago blues musicians
