= Bright Lights, Big City (song) =

Song written by Jimmy Reed

Single by Jimmy Reed

from the album Jimmy Reed at Carnegie Hall
- B-side: "I'm Mr. Luck"
- Released: August 1961
- Recorded: Chicago, 1961
- Genre: Blues
- Length: 2:39
- Label: Vee-Jay
- Songwriter: Jimmy Reed

Jimmy Reed singles chronology
"Big Boss Man" (1961)	"Bright Lights, Big City" (1961)	"Baby, What's Wrong" (1961)

"Bright Lights, Big City" is a classic blues song which was written and first recorded by American bluesman Jimmy Reed in 1961. Besides being "an integral part of the standard blues repertoire", "Bright Lights, Big City" has appealed to a variety of artists, including country and rock musicians, who have recorded their interpretations of the song.

== Background and lyrics ==
Called a "textbook Jimmy and Mama Reed duet", "Bright Lights, Big City" was a collaborative writing effort between Reed and his wife, Mary "Mama" Reed. It is a cautionary tale about urban life, with the narrator lamenting the loss of his wife or girlfriend to the nightlife and enticement of an unnamed city:

Bright lights big city, gone to my baby's head
I'd tried to tell the woman, but she don't believe a word I said ...
It's all right pretty baby, gonna need my help some day
You're gonna wish you had a listen, to some of those things I said

The song has a traditional twelve-bar blues form in Reed's signature "steady-rolling style". It was recorded in Chicago in 1961 with Jimmy Reed (vocal and harmonica), Mama Reed (vocal), Jimmy Reed, Jr. (guitar), Lefty Bates (guitar), Earl Phillips (drums), and an unidentified bassist. The song was one of Reed's most popular songs and reached number three in the Billboard R&B chart as well as number fifty-eight in the pop Hot 100. "Bright Lights, Big City" was included on the album Jimmy Reed at Carnegie Hall and appears on many Reed compilations.

=== Chart performance ===
Chart (1961)	Peak position
US Billboard Hot R&B/Hip-Hop Songs	3
US Billboard Hot 100	58

== Notable versions ==
"Bright Lights, Big City"

Single by Sonny James

from the album The Sensational Sonny James
- B-side: "True Love Lasts Forever"
- Released: 1971
- Recorded: 1971
- Genre: Country
- Length: 2:36
- Label: Capitol
- Songwriter: Jimmy Reed

Sonny James singles chronology
"Empty Arms" (1971)	"Bright Lights, Big City" (1971)	"Here Comes Honey Again" (1971)

British bluesman Duster Bennett (1946-1976) issued a version of "Bright Lights, Big City" on a single on Blue Horizon in 1969, recorded live at the Gin Mill Club in Godalming, Surrey. The song formed part of his live performances for the rest of his career and was reissued on the 2006 compilation Complete Blue Horizon Sessions, a collection of his first three albums plus early singles.

American country music singer Sonny James recorded "Bright Lights, Big City" in 1971. An early review included: "Jimmy Reed's blues number serves as strong material for the Southern Gentleman both vocally and for some exceptional guitar work". The song was James' fifteenth number-one hit in a row in the country chart as well as reaching number ninety-one in the pop chart. The song is included on James' 1971 album The Sensational Sonny James and several of his compilation albums.

In 2026, Keith Richards covered the song as a part of Grand Theft Auto VI: The Album.

=== Chart performance ===
Chart (1971)	Peak position
US Billboard Hot Country Singles	1
US Billboard Hot 100	91
Canadian RPM Country Tracks	4

== Recognition and legacy ==
Jimmy Reed's "Bright Lights, Big City" is included in the Rock and Roll Hall of Fame list of "500 Songs That Shaped Rock and Roll".
