= Cold Snap (Albert Collins album) =

Studio album by Albert Collins
- Released: 1986
- Studio: Streeterville, Chicago, Illinois
- Genre: Blues
- Label: Alligator
- Producer: Albert Collins, Bruce Iglauer, Dick Shurman

Albert Collins chronology
Showdown! (1985)	Cold Snap (1986)	Iceman (1991)

Cold Snap is an album by the American blues musician Albert Collins, released in 1986. The album was nominated for a Grammy Award in the "Best Traditional Blues Recording" category. Collins supported the album with a North American tour.

== Production ==
The album was produced by Albert Collins, Bruce Iglauer, and Dick Shurman. Mel Brown, Jimmy McGriff, and the Uptown Horns played on Cold Snap.

== Critical reception ==
Professional ratings
Review scores
Source	Rating
AllMusic	2.5/5 stars
Robert Christgau	B
The Encyclopedia of Popular Music	3/5 stars
The Penguin Guide to Blues Recordings	3/4 stars
The Philadelphia Inquirer	3/4 stars
Record Collector	4/5 stars
The Rolling Stone Album Guide	3/5 stars

Robert Christgau called the album an obvious attempt by Alligator to win for Collins a Grammy. The St. Petersburg Times deemed it "a hefty dose of Texas-style blues, augmented by the sounds of Chicago's south side." The Globe and Mail wrote that "Jimmy McGriff and the Uptown Horns contribute more smooth edges to music that has the usual Collins power but not the usual Collins urgency."

The Chicago Tribune wrote: "The skeptical should head directly to 'Too Many Dirty Dishes', where Collins' riffs seem to be literally scrubbing the pots and pans." The Providence Journal-Bulletin declared that "what really strikes the listener this time is the masterful, ice-blue singing—tasty as a snow cone and brutal as frostbite—and the wry, semi-detached lyrics."

AllMusic opined that Collins is "at his best when he's just playing the blues, not when he's trying to sing."

== Track listing ==
No.	Title	Writer(s)	Length
1.	"Cash Talkin' (The Workingman's Blues)"	Odell McLeod	4:30
2.	"Bending Like a Willow Tree"	Lowell Fulson	4:23
3.	"A Good Fool Is Hard to Find"	Gloria Houston, Nina Shackleford	4:15
4.	"Lights Are On but Nobody's Home"	Albert Collins	5:59
5.	"I Ain't Drunk"	Joe Liggins	4:06
6.	"Hooked on You"	John George Brady	4:23
7.	"Too Many Dirty Dishes"	John Newton	6:52
8.	"Snatchin' It Back"	Clarence Carter, George Jackson	3:33
9.	"Fake I.D."	Albert Collins	3:46

== Personnel ==
- Albert Collins – guitar, vocals
- Mel Brown – rhythm guitar
- Johnny Gayden – bass
- Jimmy McGriff – organ
- Allen Batts – keyboards
- Morris Jennings – drums, percussion
- Uptown Horns – horns
- Arno Hecht – tenor saxophone
- Crispin Cioe – alto and baritone saxophone
- Hollywood Paul Litteral – trumpet
- Bob Funk – trombone
