= The Blue Note Label Group =

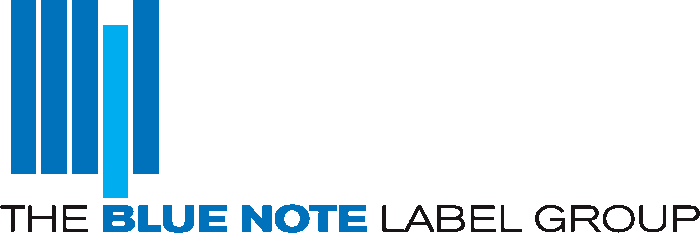

The Blue Note Label Group was formed in late 2006 by the major record company EMI and is currently owned by the Universal Music Group (UMG). It is home to many alternative, classical and jazz artists, and contains the following labels:

== Labels under Blue Note Label Group ==
- Angel Records
- Back Porch Records
- Blue Note Records
- Manhattan Records
- Mosaic Records
- Narada Productions
- Higher Octave
- Real World Records

Following labels were sold to Warner Music Group as part of Parlophone in 2013:

- EMI Classics (absorbed into Warner Classics)
- Virgin Classics (absorbed into Erato Records)
