= I'm in the Wrong Business! =

Studio album by A.C. Reed
- Released: 1987
- Genre: Chicago blues
- Label: Alligator

A.C. Reed chronology
Take These Blues and Shove 'Em (1982)	I'm in the Wrong Business! (1987)	I Want You to Love Me (1995)

I'm in the Wrong Business! is an album by the American musician A.C. Reed, released in 1987. Backed by the Spark Plugs, Reed promoted the album with a North American tour. It sold around 50,000 copies in its first two years of release.

== Production ==
The album was recorded in four studios across the United States. Reed wrote all of the album's songs; his saxophone style was influenced by J. T. Brown. Bonnie Raitt, Maurice John Vaughn, and Stevie Ray Vaughan played on I'm in the Wrong Business! Junior Markham played harmonica on "This Little Voice". The title track is a complaint about the music business; Reed made it a point to use humor in his songs.

== Critical reception ==
Professional ratings
Review scores
Source	Rating
AllMusic	4.5/5 stars
Chicago Tribune	3/4 stars
Robert Christgau	B+
The Encyclopedia of Popular Music	4/5 stars
MusicHound Blues: The Essential Album Guide	3/5 stars
The Penguin Guide to Blues Recordings	2/4 stars
The Philadelphia Inquirer	3/4 stars

Robert Christgau wrote that, "title boast to the contrary, Reed has a commercial knack—he knows how to distinguish himself from competing bluesmen, more gifted ones included." The Boston Globe deemed the album a "red-hot session" by the "definitive Chicago blues sax player." USA Today stated that "Steve Diztell's careening guitar break on the irresistibly funky 'Don't Drive Drunk' is impressive."

The Washington Post noted that, "rhythmically, the album generally has the languid, loping feel of a Jimmy Reed tune." The Philadelphia Inquirer determined that Reed "makes his own blues sound both accessible to the marketplace and gratifyingly raunchy." The Herald American wrote: "By not taking the blues too seriously, Reed has produced one of the genre's most contemporary works."

AllMusic called the album "solid, soulful blues, often with humorous, self-deprecating lyrics."

== Track listing ==
All tracks are written by A.C. Reed.

No.	Title	Length
1.	"I'm in the Wrong Business"
2.	"I Can't Go On This Way"
3.	"Fast Food Annie"
4.	"This Little Voice"
5.	"My Buddy Buddy Friends"
6.	"She's Fine"
7.	"These Blues Is Killing Me"
8.	"Miami Strut"
9.	"The Things I Want You to Do"
10.	"Don't Drive Drunk"
