= Kangaroo Records =

American record label established in 1958

Kangaroo Records was an American record label established in 1958 in Houston, Texas by co-founders Henry Hayes and M.L. Young. It was an independent label and recorded at Gold Star Studio in Houston. The label debuted the work of musical artists Albert Collins and Joe "Guitar" Hughes, including the 1958 hit "The Freeze". Hayes was also a musician and played the alto sax and recorded songs with his own band as well as backing other artists.

== History ==
Henry Hayes, Jr. was born in 1923 in Dallas, Texas. He worked as a public school teacher and lived in Houston's Third Ward. He was recorded on singles for various labels. Hayes and his friend Mel "M. L." Young started the Kangaroo Records record label together in spring of 1958.

Hayes had heard about Albert Collins from Joe "Guitar" Hughes. After seeing him perform live, Hayes encouraged Collins to record a single for Kangaroo Records. Collins recorded his debut single, "Freeze", backed with "Collins Shuffle", for the label at Gold Star Studios in the spring of 1958, with Hayes on saxophone. Texas blues bands of this period incorporated a horn section, and Collins later credited Hayes with teaching him how to arrange for horns. Collins' instrumental song "The Freeze" became a hit.

Joe Hughes first recordings were with Kangaroo Records.

Hayes was part of music groups known as the Four Kings, Rhythm Kings, and Henry Hayes Orchestra. Hayes influenced other musicians, and founded several record labels over the years.

== Discography ==
- "The Freeze", Albert Collins (1958)
- "Collins Shuffle", Albert Collins (1958)
- "I Can't Go On This Way"
- "Make Me Dance Little Ant", Joe Hughes
- "Two Big Feet" and "Call of the Kangaroo"
- "It Takes Money",
- "Stop Smackin' That Wax",
- "I Want a Big White Cadillac for Christmas", Joey Carr
- "Rock 'n' Roll Santa", Joey Carr
- Smackin' That Wax: The Kangaroo Records Story, 1959-1964 (1992), compilation
