= Quinn Wilson =

American jazz bassist and tubist (1908–1978)

- Born: December 26, 1908; Chicago, Illinois, United States
- Died: June 14, 1978 (aged 69) Evanston, Illinois, United States
- Genres: Jazz; R&B; blues
- Occupation: Instrumentalist
- Instruments: Double bass, bass guitar, tuba

Quinn Brown Wilson (December 26, 1908 – June 14, 1978) was an American jazz bassist and tubist.

Wilson played violin as a child, and studied composition and arrangement in his youth. He had his first professional experience in the mid-1920s, playing with Tiny Parham, Walter Barnes, Jelly Roll Morton (1927), Erskine Tate (1928–1931), and Richard M. Jones (1929). In the 1930s he arranged and played bass with Earl Hines from 1931 to 1939, in addition to playing bass on record with Jimmie Noone.

In the 1940s he began playing electric bass and started recording with R&B and blues musicians, including Lefty Bates and John Lee Hooker, with whom he played on several albums. He continued to play jazz as well, working with Bill Reinhardt in the 1960s and Joe Kelly in the 1970s.

== Discography ==
=== As sideman ===
With John Lee Hooker

- I'm John Lee Hooker (Vee-Jay, 1959)
- The Folk Lore of John Lee Hooker (Vee-Jay, 1961)
- Rhythm 'n' Blues (Disques Vogue, 1969)

With others

- Earl Hines, Swinging in Chicago (Ace of Hearts, 1967)
- Ella Jenkins with Franz Jackson and His Original Jass All-Stars, Play Your Instrument and Make a Pretty Sound (Folkways, 1968)
- Jelly Roll Morton, The King of New Orleans Jazz (RCA, 1959)
