= A.C. Reed =

American blues saxophonist (1926–2004)

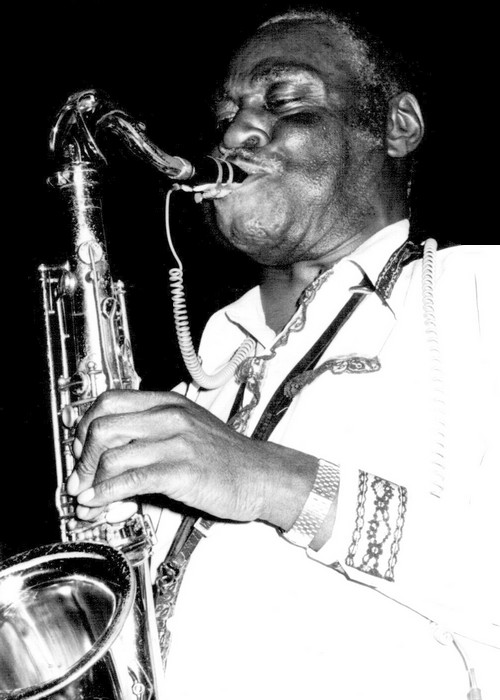
- Reed in 1980

Background information
- Born: Aaron Corthen; May 9, 1926; Wardell, Missouri, U.S.
- Died: February 24, 2004 (aged 77) Chicago, Illinois, U.S.
- Genres: Chicago blues; soul blues
- Occupation: Musician
- Instruments: Saxophone; vocals
- Years active: 1940s–2004

Aaron Corthen (May 9, 1926 – February 24, 2004), known as A.C. Reed, was an American blues saxophonist, closely associated with the Chicago blues scene from the 1940s into the 2000s.

== Biography ==
Reed was born in Wardell, Missouri, and grew up in southern Illinois. He took his stage name from his friend Jimmy Reed. He moved to Chicago during World War II, playing with Earl Hooker and Willie Mabon in the 1940s. He toured with Dennis "Long Man" Binder in 1956, and worked extensively as a sideman for Mel London's blues record labels Chief/Profile/Age in the 1960s, with Lillian Offitt and Ricky Allen, among others. He had a regionally popular single in 1961, "This Little Voice" (Age 29101), and cut several more singles over the course of the decade with Age, USA, Cool, and Nike Records.

He became a member of Buddy Guy's band in 1967, playing with him on his tour of Africa in 1969 and, with Junior Wells, opening for the Rolling Stones in 1970. He remained with Guy until 1977. He then played with Son Seals and Albert Collins in the late 1970s and 1980s. He began recording solo material for Alligator Records in the 1980s. His 1987 album, I'm in the Wrong Business!, includes cameo appearances by Stevie Ray Vaughan and Bonnie Raitt.

Reed toured extensively in the 1980s and 1990s with his band, the Spark Plugs, featuring guitarist Jerry "Hot Rod" DeMink, playing small venues throughout the United States. He and the Sparkplugs performed in Chicago before he died of cancer in 2004.

== Discography ==
- Take These Blues and Shove 'Em (Rooster Blues, 1982)
- I Got Money (Blue Phoenix, 1986) (with Maurice John Vaughn)
- I'm in the Wrong Business! (Alligator Records, 1987)
- Junk Food (Delmark Records, 1998)

With Magic Sam

- Rockin' Wild in Chicago (Delmark, 1964 [2002])

With Albert Collins

- Ice Pickin' (Alligator, 1979)
- Frostbite (Alligator, 1980)
- Don't Lose Your Cool (Alligator, 1983)
- Live in Japan ( Alligator,1984)

== See also ==
- List of Chicago blues musicians
- List of Soul-blues musicians
