= Southern Fried (John Hammond album) =

Studio album by John Hammond
- Released: 1969
- Recorded: 1969
- Studio: Muscle Shoals
- Genre: Blues
- Length: 36:56
- Label: Atlantic
- Producers: Marlin Greene, John Hammond

John Hammond chronology
Sooner or Later (1968)	Southern Fried (1969)	Source Point (1970)

Southern Fried is an album of blues music by John Hammond. It was recorded in 1969 at Muscle Shoals Sound Studio in Alabama, and features several members of the Muscle Shoals Rhythm Section. Duane Allman plays guitar on four of the songs.

== Critical reception ==
On AllMusic, Richie Unterberger wrote, "Where this might have a leg up on some other early Hammond efforts – and a leg up on blues cover albums in general – is in the stellar band, featuring Muscle Shoals stalwarts like Eddie Hinton and Roger Hawkins."

When the album was released, Billboard said, "A fine effort by Hammond whose talents are showcased with superb backgrounds and, of course, expert production."

== Track listing ==
Side one

1. "Shake for Me" (Willie Dixon) – 2:44
2. "Cryin' for My Baby" (Harold Burrage) – 2:42
3. "I'm Tore Down" (Sonny Thompson) – 2:45
4. "Don't Go No Further" (Dixon) – 2:40
5. "I'm Leavin' You" (Chester Burnett) – 3:19
6. "It's Too Late" (Chuck Willis) – 3:02

Side two

1. "Nadine" (Chuck Berry) – 3:41
2. "Mystery Train" (Sam Phillips, Harman Parker) – 2:59
3. "My Time After a While" (Robert L. Geddins, Ronald Dean Badger) – 4:01
4. "I Can't Be Satisfied" (McKinley Morganfield) – 3:12
5. "You'll Be Mine" (Dixon) – 2:35
6. "Riding in the Moonlight" (Burnett) – 2:28

== Personnel ==
Musicians

- John Hammond – guitar, harmonica, vocals
- Barry Beckett – keyboards
- Eddie Hinton – guitar
- David Hood – bass
- Roger Hawkins – drums

Additional musicians

- On "I'm Leavin' You", "Nadine", "My Time After a While", "Riding in the Moonlight":
  - Joe Arnold – tenor saxophone
  - Earl Logan – tenor and baritone saxophones
  - Lewis Collins – tenor saxophone
  - James Mitchell – baritone saxophone
  - Gene "Bowlegs" Miller – trumpet
- On "Shake for Me", "Cryin' for My Baby", "I'm Leavin' You", "You'll Be Mine":
  - Duane Allman – guitar
- On "Nadine", "Mystery Train":
  - Jimmy Johnson – guitar
- On "Cryin' for My Baby", "You'll Be Mine":
  - Marlin Greene – bass

Production

- Produced by Marlin Greene and John Hammond
- Recording engineers: Marlin Greene, Jimmy Johnson
- Photography: Jim Cummings, Joel Brodsky
- Cover design: Heig Adishian
