= Ice Pickin' =

Studio album by Albert Collins
- Released: 1978
- Studios: Curtom (Chicago, Illinois)
- Genre: Blues
- Length: 36:48
- Label: Alligator ALCD 4713
- Producers: Bruce Iglauer, Richard McLeese, Dick Shurman

Albert Collins chronology
Alive & Cool (1972)	Ice Pickin' (1978)	Albert Collins and Barrelhouse live (1979)

Ice Pickin' is a studio album by Albert Collins, released in 1978. It was Collins's breakthrough album. Ice Pickin' was nominated for a 1979 Grammy Award.

== Production ==
The album was recorded at Curtom Studios, in Chicago. The Guardian wrote of Collins's guitar technique: "Collins had developed a highly distinctive approach to the guitar, tuning it to a D minor chord and using a capo high up the neck to achieve a sharp, brilliant effect, his 'ice-cold, sheet-metal sound' that was mirrored in the name of his band, The Icebreakers."

== Critical reception ==
Professional ratings
Review scores
Source	Rating
AllMusic	5/5 stars
Christgau's Record Guide	A−
The Encyclopedia of Popular Music	4/5 stars
The Penguin Guide to Blues Recordings	+ “Crown”
The Rolling Stone Album Guide	4.5/5 stars
DownBeat	4.5/5 stars

The Bay State Banner thought that "when Collins cooks, with fluent riffs and humorous vocals plus innovative tuning and incorporation of minor blues keys, the result is masterful." The Rolling Stone Album Guide wrote that the album "burrows down to the real nitty gritty of urban existence ... it's one of the best '70s blues albums." The Chicago Tribune called the album "a classic." The Iowa City Press-Citizen called it "a cool, invigorating blast across the era's barren blues landscape." The Dayton Daily News wrote that Collins "made several other stellar releases before his untimely demise in '93, but none match the muscle and depth of this certifiable classic."

Melody Maker deemed it the best blues album of 1978, as did the Montreaux Jazz Festival.

In addition to a four stars out of four rating, the authors of The Penguin Guide to Blues Recordings awarded the album a “Crown”, indicating that they considered it to be an exceptional CD, and one that should be part of any blues collection.

DownBeat gave the album 4.5 stars. Reviewer Ben Sandmel wrote, "Ice Pickin’ is definitely Collins’ best album to date, putting across his power and charisma without a hint of his repetition. Albert’s vocals and guitar are both very strong, and he’s consistently pushed by a band that plays everything with skill and feeling . . . Collins is backed here by some of Chicago’s best blues players, most of whom now join him on tour.".

== Liner notes ==
According to the inside cover of the album:

Albert King names Collins as his favorite guitarist, and John Lee Hooker declares, "I'm an Albert Collins freak!"

== Track listing ==
1. "Honey, Hush! (Talking Woman Blues)" (Lowell Fulson, Ferdinand Washington) - 04:28
2. "When the Welfare Turns Its Back on You" (Lucious Porter Weaver, Sonny Thompson) - 05:26
3. "Ice Pick" (Collins) - 03:08
4. "Cold, Cold Feeling" (Jessie Mae Robinson) - 05:19
5. "Too Tired" (Saul Bihari, Maxwell Davis, Johnny "Guitar" Watson) - 03:00
6. "Master Charge" (Gwen Collins) - 05:12
7. "Conversation with Collins" (Collins) - 08:52
8. "Avalanche" (Collins) - 02:39

== Personnel ==
- Albert Collins - guitar, vocals
- Larry Burton - guitar
- Allen Batts - keyboards
- Aron Burton - bass
- Casey Jones - drums
- A.C. Reed - tenor saxophone
- Chuck Smith - baritone saxophone
