= Dan Brodie =

Daniel John Brodie
- Origin: Australia
- Genres: Singer-songwriter, Alt-country, Rock n Roll, Acoustic
- Occupations: Singer, songwriter, musician
- Instruments: Guitar, piano, accordion
- Website: danbrodie.com.au

Dan Brodie is an Australian singer, songwriter and musician from Melbourne, best known for his solo career.

In addition to releasing his own albums, Brodie frequently performs as a sideman with artists including Ben Mastwyk and His Millions, Leroy Macqueen and Katie Brianna

== Discography ==
=== Studio albums ===
Title	Details
Big Black Guitar (as Dan Brodie and The Broken Arrows)	Released: 1999; Label: Laughing Outlaw Records (LORCD-007); Format: CD
Empty Arms Broken Hearts (as Dan Brodie and The Broken Arrows)	Released: 2002; Label: Capitol Records (540636 2); Format: CD
Beautiful Crimes	Released: 2006; Label: Capitol Records (563879 2); Format: CD
My Friend the Murderer (as Dan Brodie & The Grieving Widows)	Released: 2011; Label: Fat Swine; Format: CD, digital
Deep, Deep Love	Released: 2013; Label: Fat Swine; Format: CD, digital
Lost Not Found	Released: 2017; Label: Fat Swine; Format: CD, LP, digital
Funerária Do Vale	Released: 2019; Label: Midnight Baby Recording Co; Format: CD, LP, digital
The Ballad of Cowboy Dan	Released: 2023; Label: Midnight Baby Recording Co; Format: CD, LP, digital

=== Live albums ===
Title	Details
Big Hearted Lovin' Man: A Retrospective:1999-2014	Released: 2015; Label: Fat Swine; Format: CD, digital; Recorded live in Salt Studios, Melbourne, Australia on 31 January 2015.

=== Extended plays ===
Title	Details
I'm Floatin' Mamma	Released: 1998; Label: Big Black Guitar Records; Format: CD
You Make Me Wanna Kill (as Dan Brodie & The Broken Arrows)	Released: 2001; Label: EMI (24355019127); Format: CD
Run Yourself Ragged EP (as Dan Brodie & The Grieving Widows)	Released: 2014; Label: Fat Swine; Format: CD, digital

== Awards and nominations ==
=== ARIA Music Awards ===
The ARIA Music Awards is an annual awards ceremony that recognises excellence, innovation, and achievement across all genres of Australian music. They commenced in 1987.

Year	Nominee / work	Award	Result	Ref.
2002	Empty Arms Broken Hearts	Breakthrough Artist - Album	Nominated	
2002	Empty Arms Broken Hearts	Best Male Artist	Nominated	
