= Jimmy Reed at Carnegie Hall =

Studio album by Jimmy Reed
- Released: 1961
- Recorded: 1954–1961
- Genre: Chicago blues
- Length: 62:47
- Label: Vee-Jay
- Producer: Calvin Carter

Jimmy Reed chronology
Now Appearing (1960)	Jimmy Reed at Carnegie Hall (1961)	Just Jimmy Reed (1962)

Jimmy Reed at Carnegie Hall is a double album by Jimmy Reed, released in 1961.

== Overview ==
Though the title suggests that the record was recorded live, it consists of studio recreations of a Carnegie Hall performance along with additional studio recordings.

"Bright Lights, Big City", which opens the album, was released as a single around the same time. It became one of Reed's most successful and last songs on the Billboard Hot R&B charts. The album includes several other Reed songs that appeared on the charts between 1956 and 1961.

== Critical reception ==
Professional ratings
Review scores
Source	Rating
AllMusic	5/5 stars
The Penguin Guide to Blues Recordings	3.5/4 stars

Writing for AllMusic, critic Richie Unterberger gave the album five out of five stars. He noted "In some ways, it almost does make for a greatest-hits compilation, as it contains most of Reed's most popular tunes".

== Chart performance ==
The album debuted on the US Billboard Top LP's chart for monaural albums on October 22, 1961, peaking at number 46 during a thirty-one week stay on the chart.

Chart (1961)	Peak position
US Billboard Top LP's (Monaural)	46

== Track listing ==
All songs by Jimmy Reed; except where noted.

Record 1, side 1:

1. "Bright Lights, Big City" – 2:50
2. "I'm Mr. Luck" – 3:34
3. "Baby What's Wrong" – 3:24
4. "Found Joy" – 3:41
5. "Kind of Lonesome" – 2:52

Record 1, side 2:

1. "Aw Shucks, Hush Your Mouth" – 2:33
2. "Tell Me You Love Me" (Jimmy Reed, Al Smith) – 2:54
3. "Blue Carnegie" – 2:53
4. "I'm a Love You" – 2:07
5. "Hold Me Close" – 2:38
6. "Blue Blue Water" – 2:45

Record 2, side 1:

1. "Baby What You Want Me to Do" – 2:31
2. "You Don't Have to Go" – 3:10
3. "Hush Hush" – 2:43
4. "Found Love" – 2:24
5. "Honest I Do" (Jimmy Reed, Ewart Abner) – 2:50
6. "You Got Me Dizzy" – 2:58

Record 2, side 2:

1. "Big Boss Man" (Luther Dixon, Al Smith) – 2:54
2. "Take Out Some Insurance" (Jesse Stone) – 2:31
3. "Boogie in the Dark" – 2:41
4. "Going to New York" – 2:26
5. "Ain't That Loving You Baby" – 2:25
6. "The Sun is Shining" (Jimmy Reed, Ewart Abner) – 2:57

== Personnel ==
- Jimmy Reed – guitar, vocals, harmonica
- Eddie Taylor – guitar
- Phil Upchurch – guitar
- Lonnie Brooks – guitar
- William "Lefty" Bates – second guitar
- Willie Dixon – bass guitar
- Earl Phillips – drums
- Mary Lee Reed – backing vocals
