= Jimmy Gresham =

American soul singer and songwriter (born 1934)

- Born: James Henry Gresham; October 14, 1934 (age 92); Selma, Alabama, U.S.
- Genre: Soul
- Occupations: Singer; songwriter
- Label: Tac-Ful
- Formerly of: Rosey Grier
- Military career
- Allegiance: United States
- Branch: United States Navy
- Conflicts: Korean War
- Awards: National Defense Service Medal; China Service Medal

James Henry Gresham (born October 14, 1934, in Selma, Alabama), is a soul singer and songwriter.

He wrote and produced records in Los Angeles in the 1960s, and BMI lists 14 songs to his credit. He also played in Rosey Grier's band and wrote and produced records for Rosey's record label, Tac-Ful. He has appeared on shows with Wilson Pickett, Joe Tex, and many other major soul musicians.

He served in the United States Navy during the Korean War and was awarded the National Defense Service Medal and the China Service Medal.
