= Pointblank Records =

Record company

- Parent company: Virgin Records
- Founded: 1988
- Founder: John Wooler
- Defunct: 2007
- Status: Inactive
- Distributor: EMI
- Country of origin: United Kingdom

Pointblank Records is a record label subsidiary of Virgin Records.

Pointblank Records was founded in 1988 by John Wooler. Wooler served as Deputy Head of A&R at Virgin Records UK from 1984 to 1994 and Senior Vice President of Virgin Records US from 1994 to 2002. He had a passion for blues, Americana and soul. His manager, Simon Draper, granted him a small budget to create the label. The first act signed to the record label was Larry McCray followed by Albert Collins and The Kinsey Report. Artists such as John Lee Hooker, Solomon Burke, Pops Staples, John Hammond, Walter "Wolfman" Washington, Van Morrison, and Johnny Winter were later signed to the label as well. Wooler signed all the musicians on the label and produced many of them.

== See also ==
- Lists of record labels
