= Albert Collins =

American blues guitarist and singer (1932–1993)

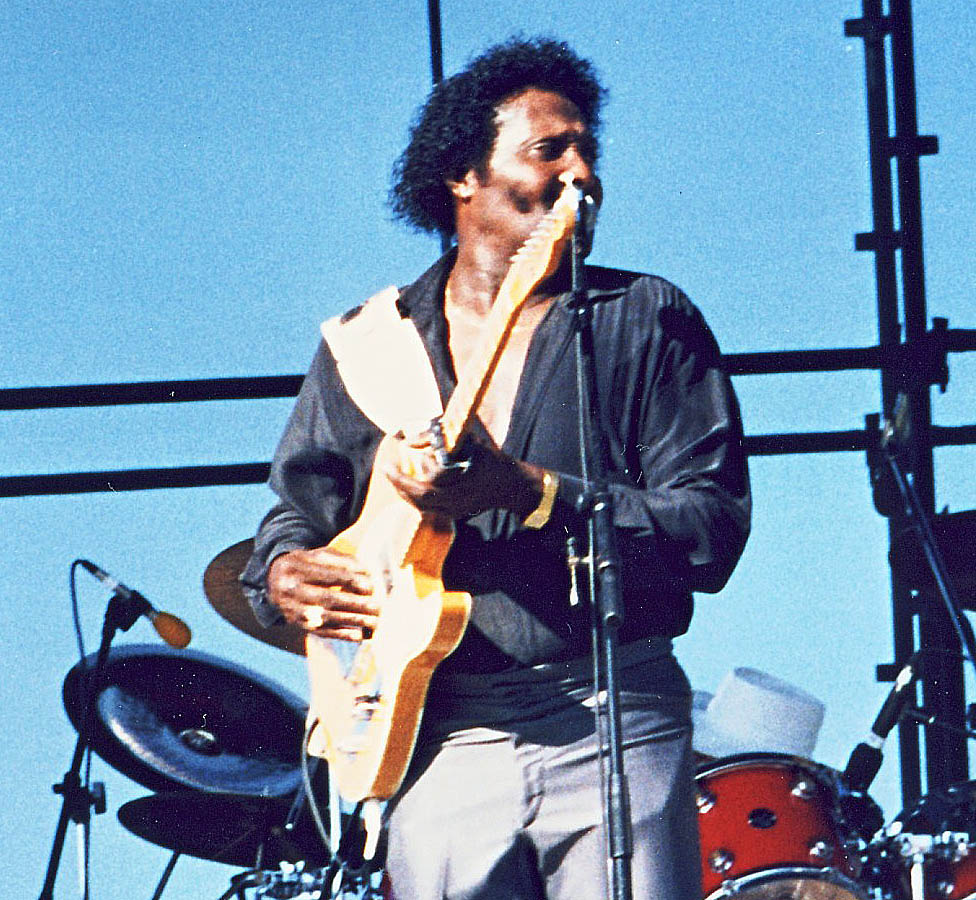
- Collins in 1990

Background information
- Also known as: The Ice Man; Master of the Telecaster
- Born: Albert Gene Collins; October 1, 1932; Leona, Texas, U.S.
- Died: November 24, 1993 (aged 61) Las Vegas, Nevada, U.S.
- Genres: Blues; blues rock; Texas blues; jump blues
- Occupations: Musician; songwriter
- Instruments: Guitar; vocals; harmonica
- Years active: 1950–1993
- Labels: Imperial; Alligator

Albert Gene Collins (October 1, 1932 – November 24, 1993) was an American electric blues guitarist and singer with a distinctive guitar style. He was noted for his powerful playing and his use of altered tunings and a capo. His long association with the Fender Telecaster led to the title "The Master of the Telecaster".

== Early life ==
Collins was born in Leona, Texas, on October 1, 1932. He was introduced to the guitar at an early age by his cousin Lightnin' Hopkins, also a Leona resident, who played at family gatherings. The Collins family relocated to Marquez, Texas, in 1938 and to Houston in 1941, where he attended Jack Yates High School. Collins took piano lessons when he was young, but when his piano tutor was unavailable his cousin Willow Young would lend Albert his guitar and taught him the altered tuning that he used throughout his career. Collins tuned his guitar to an open F-minor chord (FCFA♭CF), with a capo at the 5th, 6th or 7th fret. At the age of sixteen, he decided to concentrate on learning the guitar after hearing "Boogie Chillen' " by John Lee Hooker.

== Career ==
At 18, Collins started his own group, the Rhythm Rockers, in which he honed his craft. During this time he was employed for four years at a ranch in Normangee, Texas; he then worked as a truck driver for various companies for 12 years.

Collins played an Epiphone guitar during his first two years with the Rhythm Rockers, but in 1952, after seeing Clarence "Gatemouth" Brown playing a Fender Esquire, he decided to purchase a Fender. He wanted a Telecaster, but because of the cost he chose to buy an Esquire, which he took to the Parker Music Company in Houston to be fitted with a Telecaster neck pickup. This was his main guitar until he moved to California, and it was the guitar that he used on his earliest recordings, including his signature song, "Frosty". For the rest of his career he played a "maple cap"–necked natural ash body Fender 1966 Custom Telecaster with a Gibson PAF humbucking pickup retrofitted into the neck position, which became the basis for a Fender Custom Artist signature model in 1990.

In 1954, Collins, then aged 22 and without a record release, was joined in the Rhythm Rockers by 17-year-old Johnny Copeland, who had just left the Dukes of Rhythm (a band he had started with the Houston blues musician Joe "Guitar" Hughes).

Collins started to play regularly in Houston, notably at Shady's Playhouse, where James "Widemouth" Brown (brother of Gatemouth Brown) and other well-known Houston blues musicians would meet for "Blue Monday" jams. By the mid-1950s, he had established his reputation as a local guitarist of note and had started to appear regularly at a Fifth Ward club, Walter's Lounge, with the group Big Tiny and the Thunderbirds.

The saxophonist and music teacher Henry Hayes heard about Collins from Hughes. After seeing him perform live, Hayes encouraged Collins to record a single for Kangaroo Records, a label he had started with his friend M. L. Young. Collins recorded his debut single, "Freeze", backed with "Collins Shuffle", for Kangaroo at Gold Star Studios, in Houston, in the spring of 1958, with Hayes on saxophone. Texas blues bands of this period incorporated a horn section, and Collins later credited Hayes with teaching him how to arrange for horns.

=== 1960s ===
In 1964, he recorded "Frosty" at Gulf Coast Recording Studio in Beaumont, Texas for Hall Records, owned by Bill Hall, who had signed Collins on the recommendation of Cowboy Jack Clement, a songwriter and producer who had engineered sessions for Jerry Lee Lewis and Johnny Cash at Sun Records. His debut album, The Cool Sound of Albert Collins, released in 1965 on the TCF Hall label, consisted of previously released instrumentals, including "Thaw-Out", "Sno-Cone", and "Don't Lose Your Cool".

On June 19, 1968, the group Canned Heat was playing at the Music Hall in Houston, and a friend of theirs mentioned that Collins was playing at the Ponderosa Club, which they duly attended. After Collins had finished playing, they introduced themselves and offered to help secure an agent for him as well as an introduction to Imperial Records in California. With the offer of a record deal and regular live work, Collins decided to move, relocating to Kansas City in July 1968, where he played in the organ trio of the keyboardist Lawrence Wright, and then in November moving to Palo Alto, California. For his 1968 Imperial album, Collins chose the title Love Can Be Found Anywhere (Even in a Guitar), from the lyrics of Canned Heat's "Fried Hockey Boogie", in honor of Canned Heat and their lead singer Bob Hite, who wrote the liner notes for the album. In the spring of 1969 Collins was hired by Bob Krasnow to play on the Ike and Tina Turner album The Hunter, which was released by Krasnow's Blue Thumb Records. The move to California was proving to be the right decision, with Collins establishing himself as a regular act on the West Coast circuit, playing at the Fillmore West and the Whisky a Go Go and at the "Newport 69" festival in Northridge, California, in June 1969 and the Gold Rush Festival at Lake Amador, California, in October. In December 1969, his debut album, The Cool Sound of Albert Collins, was reissued as Truckin' with Albert Collins by Blue Thumb. He opened for the Grateful Dead at the Family Dog on the Great Highway in San Francisco in early August, 1969.

=== 1970s ===
In November 1971, the Denver label Tumbleweed Records, which had been newly created by Larry Ray and Bill Szymczyk, released Collins's album There's Gotta Be a Change; it was the label's first official release. The single "Get Your Business Straight", backed with "Frog Jumpin'", was released by Tumbleweed in February 1972. In 1973 Tumbleweed closed because of financial problems, leaving Collins without a record label. He was signed by Bruce Iglauer, the owner of Alligator Records, in 1978 on the recommendation of Dick Shurman, whom Collins had met in Seattle. His first release for the label was Ice Pickin' (1978), which was recorded at Curtom Studios, in Chicago, and produced by Iglauer, Shurman and Richard McLeese. On February 2, 1978, Collins appeared in concert with the Dutch band Barrelhouse, which was his first live appearance outside the United States. The concert was filmed for the Dutch TV show Tros Sesjun and was subsequently released on vinyl in 1979 by Munich Records as Albert Collins with The Barrelhouse Live.

=== 1980s ===
Collins won a W. C. Handy Award in the category Best Contemporary Blues Album in 1983 for his Alligator release Don't Lose Your Cool.

In 1984 Collins did a two-tape instructional lesson for Arlen Roth and his company, Hot Licks.

On July 13, 1985, Collins performed with George Thorogood and the Destroyers at Live Aid, appearing as guest soloist on "Madison Blues"; the US part of the charity concert was held at JFK Stadium in Philadelphia and, with simultaneous broadcasts in other countries, was viewed by over 1.5 billion people. In December 1986, Collins appeared in concert with Etta James and Joe Walsh at the Wiltern Theater, in Los Angeles; the concert was subsequently released on video under the title Jazzvisions: Jump the Blues Away. The backing musicians for the concert were Rick Rosas (bass), Michael Huey (drums), Ed Sanford (Hammond B3 organ), Kip Noble (piano) and Josh Sklar (guitar). Also in 1986, Collins won a Grammy Award with Robert Cray and Johnny Copeland for their album Showdown! Collins finished working on his seventh Alligator album, Cold Snap, by October 1986. It was released shortly afterwards to good reviews and received a Grammy nomination for Best Traditional Blues Recording of 1987. Collins cited the album as personally important to him because of the involvement of the organist Jimmy McGriff, an early musical idol, with whom Collins had played in Kansas City, Missouri, in 1966.

On February 12, 1987, Collins appeared as a musical guest on the NBC talk show Late Night with David Letterman. He made a cameo appearance later that same year in the comedy film Adventures in Babysitting. Also in 1987, the American composer John Zorn and Collins collaborated on a suite, "Two-Lane Highway", which was subsequently released on Zorn's album Spillane. On April 22, 1988, Collins appeared at the New Orleans Jazz and Heritage Festival in a group consisting of B.B. King, Eric Clapton and Stevie Ray Vaughan; the group played on the steamboat President as it cruised along the Mississippi River, in recognition of the musical heritage of New Orleans and artists such as Fate Marable, Louis Armstrong and Red Allen, who had entertained passengers on the fleet of riverboats owned by the Streckfus brothers.

=== 1990s ===
Collins was signed to Pointblank Records, a subsidiary of Virgin Records, in 1991 and released the album Iceman the same year. Iglauer expressed his disappointment at the departure of Collins from Alligator while acknowledging that he had signed Collins on a record-to-record basis. On November 15, 1991, Collins performed with Cray, Steve Cropper and Dave Edmunds at the Guitar Legends event in Seville, a series of five concerts to promote the upcoming Seville Expo '92. The preceding month, on October 28, Collins was filmed in concert for the television program Austin City Limits; the concert was broadcast on February 21, 1992 and released on DVD in April 2008 as Albert Collins: Live From Austin, TX. In 1993, Collins played at the Pointblank Borderline Blues Festival in London, which ran from March 17 to 27; this was his last appearance in the UK.

Collins was performing at the Paléo Festival in Nyon, Switzerland, in July 1993 when he was taken ill. He was diagnosed in mid-August with lung cancer, which had metastasized to his liver, with an expected survival time of four months. Tracks for his last album, Live '92/'93, were recorded at shows that September. Collins died on November 24, 1993 at the age of 61. His final album, Live '92/'93, was posthumously nominated at the 38th Grammy Awards of 1996 in the category Best Blues Contemporary Album.

== Style ==
Collins is remembered for his informal and audience-engaging live performances. He would frequently leave the stage while still playing to mingle with the audience. The use of an extended guitar cord allowed Collins to go outside clubs to the sidewalk; one anecdote stated that he left a club with the audience in tow to visit the store next door to buy a candy bar without once stopping his act.

He is also remembered for his humorous stage presence, which can be seen in the comedy film Adventures in Babysitting. It is also prominent in the documentary Antones: Austin's Home of the Blues: Collins was playing a lengthy solo one night at Antone's and left the building while still playing. He returned to the stage still playing the solo and resumed entertaining the audience in person. Shortly afterwards, a man arrived at the club and gave Collins the pizza he had just ordered.

== Personal life ==
In his early days, Collins worked as a paint mixer and truck driver to make ends meet. In 1971, when he was 39 years old, he worked in construction, since he could not make a proper living from his music. One of his construction jobs was a remodeling project for Neil Diamond. He continued with this type of work until the late 1970s, when his wife, Gwen, talked him into returning to a career in music.

After a three-month battle with cancer, Collins died at his home in Las Vegas, Nevada, on November 24, 1993. He was 61 years old. Surviving him were his wife, Gwendolyn, and his father, Andy Thomas.

Albert Collins is buried at Davis Memorial Park in Las Vegas, Nevada, a cemetery adjacent to Harry Reid International Airport.

== Legacy ==
Collins was an inspiration to a generation of Texas guitar players, including Stevie Ray Vaughan and Jimmie Vaughan. He was among a small group of Texas blues players, along with Johnny "Guitar" Watson and Johnny Copeland, who shaped the legacy of T-Bone Walker into a modern blues template that was to have a major influence on many later players. In an interview with Guitar World magazine, Robert Cray said, "it was seeing Albert Collins at a rock festival in 1969 that really turned my head around." Two years later, Collins played at Cray's high-school graduation party in Tacoma, Washington, and the ice-pick sound sank in deep: "That was it," Cray recalled. "That changed my whole life around. From that moment I started seriously studying the blues." Rolling Stone ranked Collins at number 56 on its list of the 100 greatest guitarists.

== Discography ==
=== Studio albums ===
- 1965: The Cool Sound of Albert Collins (TCF Hall TCF-8002) collection of singles, reissued in 1969 as Truckin' with Albert Collins (Blue Thumb BTS-8)
- 1968: Love Can Be Found Anywhere (Even in a Guitar) (Imperial LP-12428)
- 1969: Trash Talkin' (Imperial LP-12438)
- 1970: The Compleat Albert Collins (Imperial LP-12449)
- 1971: There's Gotta Be a Change (Tumbleweed TWS-103) (His only album to chart, it reached No. 196 on the Billboard Top LPs, in 1972).
- 1978: Ice Pickin' (Alligator AL-4713)
- 1980: Frostbite (Alligator AL-4719)
- 1983: Don't Lose Your Cool (Alligator AL-4730)
- 1986: Cold Snap (Alligator AL-4752) - with Jimmy McGriff
- 1991: Iceman (Pointblank/Virgin VPBCD-3; 91583; 86197; 39194)

=== Collaborations ===
- 1985: Showdown! (Alligator AL-4743) - with Robert Cray, Johnny Copeland

=== Live albums ===
- 1969: Alive & Cool (Red Lightnin' RL-004) - live at the Fillmore West, 1969
- 1976: The Bicentennial Session (Crossed Arrow Music 2008)
- 1978: Albert Collins with The Barrelhouse Live (Munich Records BM-150225)
- 1979: Jammin' with Albert (Blues Tune BT-008) - with Champion Jack Dupree, Rory Gallagher
- 1981: Frozen Alive! (Alligator AL-4725) - live at the Union Bar, Minneapolis, MN
- 1984: Live in Japan (Alligator AL-4733) - live at Kudan Kaikan, Tokyo, 1982
- 1989: Jazzvisions: Jump the Blues Away (Verve 841287) - with Etta James, Joe Walsh
- 1995: Live '92/'93 (Pointblank/Virgin 40658)
- 1995: Cold Tremours (Blues Boulevard 250186, Music Avenue 250186)
- 1995: Charly Blues Legends Live – Vol. 7 (Charly CBL-756)
- 1998: Molten Ice (Cass Records CAS-70108) - live at the El Mocambo Club, 1973; also released as The Things He Used To Do, The Iceman Cometh, and The Hot 'Cool' Sound of Albert Collins
- 2005: The Iceman at Mount Fuji (Fuel 2000/Varese 061457) - live at the Mt. Fuji Jazz Festival, 1992
- 2008: Live at Montreux 1992 (Eagle ER-20124)
- 2014: Funky Blues – Live 1973 (Rockbeat ROC-3275) - live at Joe's Place, Cambridge, MA
- 2016: Live at Rockpalast – Dortmund 1980 (MIG Music 90632, 2-CD + DVD set)
- 2017: At Onkel Pö's Carnegie Hall – Hamburg 1980 (Delta Music N-77040, 2-CD set)

=== Compilations ===
- 1991: The Complete Imperial Recordings (EMI America 96740, 2-CD set)
- 1993: Collins Mix (The Best Of) (Pointblank/Virgin 39097) - re-recordings of his classic tracks
- 1997: Albert Collins: Deluxe Edition (Alligator ALCD-5601)
- 1999: The Ice Axe Cometh (The Collection 1978–1986) (Music Club MCCD-406)

=== Guest work ===
- Gary Moore, "Too Tired" on Still Got the Blues
- Gary Moore, "The Blues is Alright" on After Hours
- Gary Moore, "Too Tired" on Blues Alive
- David Bowie, "Underground" on Labyrinth
- Jack Bruce, "Blues You Can't Lose" on A Question of Time
- Robert Cray, "You're Gonna Need Me" on Shame + A Sin
- John Lee Hooker, "Backstabbers" on Mr. Lucky
- John Lee Hooker, "Boogie at Russian Hill" on Boom Boom
- B.B. King, "Call It Stormy Monday" on Blues Summit
- Ron Levy's Wild Kingdom, "Chillin' Out" and "Defrostin'" on B-3 Blues and Grooves
- Branford Marsalis, Super Models in Deep Conversation
- Buckshot LeFonque, "No Pain, No Gain" on Buckshot LeFonque
- John Mayall, "Light the Fuse" and "I'm a Sucker for Love" on Wake Up Call
- John Zorn, "Two-Lane Highway" on Spillane
- "Blues for Stevie" on Guitar World Presents...'Guitars That Rule The World' (various artists 1991 sampler)

=== Singles ===
- "Freeze" / "Collins Shuffle" (Kangaroo KA-103/KA-104)
- "Defrost" / "Albert's Alley" (Great Scott 0007; Hall-Way 1913; Hall-Way/Smash 1795)
- "Homesick" / "Sippin' Soda" (Hall-Way/Smash 1831)
- "Frosty" / "Tremble" (Hall 1920)
- "Thaw-out" / "Backstroke" (Hall 1925)
- "Sno-Cone, Part I" / "Sno-Cone, Part II" (TCF Hall 104)
- "Hot 'n' Cold" / "Dyin' Flu" (TCF Hall 116)
- "Don't Lose Your Cool" / "Frost Bite" (TCF Hall 127)
- "(What'd You Say) I Don't Know" / "Soulroad" (Tracie 2003)
- "Cookin' Catfish" / "Taking My Time" (20th Century/ABC 6708)
- "Ain't Got Time" / "Got a Good Thing Goin'" (Imperial 66351)
- "Do the Sissy" / "Turnin' On" (Imperial 66391)
- "Conversation with Collins" / "And Then It Started Raining" (Imperial 66412)
- "Coon 'n' Collards" / "Do What You Want to Do" (Liberty 56184)
- "Get Your Business Straight" / "Frog Jumpin'" (Tumbleweed 1002)
- "Eight Days on the Road" / "Stickin'" (Tumbleweed 1007)

== Videography ==
- 1986 Further On Down the Road: Albert Collins, Lonnie Mack, Roy Buchanan – Live at Carnegie Hall (Alligator)
- 2003 The Iceman at Mount Fuji (Fuel 2000/Varese 061299)
- 2003 In Concert: One Filter (Music Video Distributors 6526)
- 2005 Albert Collins: Warner Bros. Classics (Warner Bros. 9086390)
- 2006 Live Has Many Faces (Munich MRDVD-6004)
- 2008 Live From Austin TX (New West NW-8051)
- 2008 Live at Montreux 1992 (Eagle Vision EREDV641)
- 2016 Live at Rockpalast – Dortmund 1980 (MIG Music 90632, 2-CD + DVD set)

== Film and television ==
- 1978 Live Has Many Faces (Barrelhouse featuring Albert Collins, filmed for the Dutch television show Tros Sesjun)
- 1987 Late Night with David Letterman (television show musical guest)
- 1987 Adventures in Babysitting (motion picture film cameo with his band)
- 1992 Austin City Limits [season 17, episode 5] (1991 studio concert)
