= Jimmy Reed =

American blues musician (1925–1976)

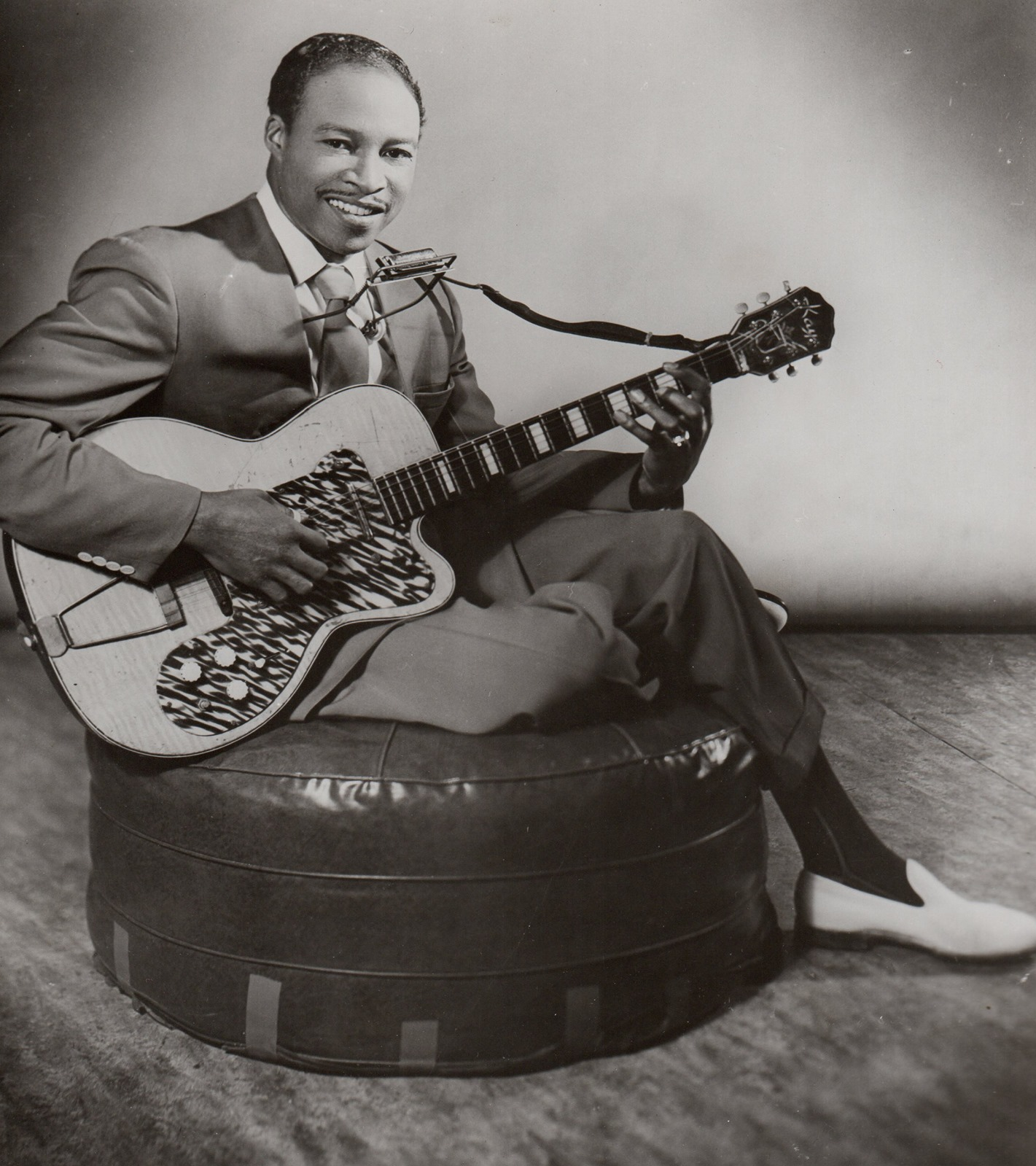

Background information
- Born: Mathis James Reed; September 6, 1925; Dunleith, Mississippi, U.S.
- Died: August 29, 1976 (aged 50) Oakland, California, U.S.
- Genres: Blues, electric blues
- Occupations: Musician; songwriter
- Instruments: Guitar; vocals; harmonica
- Years active: 1940s–1976
- Label: Vee-Jay

Mathis James Reed (September 6, 1925 – August 29, 1976) was an American blues musician and songwriter. His particular style of electric blues was popular with a wide variety of audiences. Reed's songs such as "Honest I Do" (1957), "Baby What You Want Me to Do" (1960), "Big Boss Man" (1961), and "Bright Lights, Big City" (1961) appeared on both Billboard magazine's R&B and Hot 100 singles charts.

Reed influenced many other musicians, including Elvis Presley, Hank Williams Jr., Bob Dylan, Neil Young, and the Rolling Stones, who recorded his songs. Music critic Cub Koda describes him as "perhaps the most influential bluesman of all," due to his easily accessible style.

== Biography ==
Reed was born in Dunleith, Mississippi. He learned the harmonica and guitar from his friend Eddie Taylor. After several years of busking and performing there, he moved to Chicago, Illinois, in 1943. He was then drafted into the U.S. Navy and served in World War II. He was discharged in 1945 and returned briefly to Mississippi, marrying his girlfriend, Mary (henceforth known as Mama Reed). Mama Reed would be an uncredited background singer on many of his recordings, notably the hits "Baby What You Want Me to Do", "Big Boss Man" and "Bright Lights, Big City". He then moved to Gary, Indiana, to work at an Armour meat-packing plant.

"At his best—on Vee-Jay in the '50s—Reed sang with the languid self-assurance of a man who never ran for the bus because he wanted to spend the fare on a glass of wine, and the unindustrious shuffle rhythms of the Vee-Jay band ambled right along behind."

— Christgau's Record Guide: Rock Albums of the Seventies (1981)

By the 1950s, Reed had established himself as a popular musician. He joined the Gary Kings with John Brim and played on the street with Willie Joe Duncan. Reed failed to gain a recording contract with Chess Records, but signed with Vee-Jay Records through Brim's drummer, Albert King. At Vee-Jay, Reed began playing again with Eddie Taylor and soon released "You Don't Have to Go", his first hit record. It was followed by a long string of hit songs.

Reed maintained his reputation despite his rampant alcoholism; his wife sometimes had to help him remember the lyrics to his songs while recording. In 1957, Reed developed epilepsy, though the condition was not correctly diagnosed for a long time, as Reed and doctors assumed it was delirium tremens. When Vee-Jay Records closed, his manager signed a contract with the fledgling ABC-Bluesway label, but Reed never produced another hit. In 1968, he toured Europe with the American Folk Blues Festival.

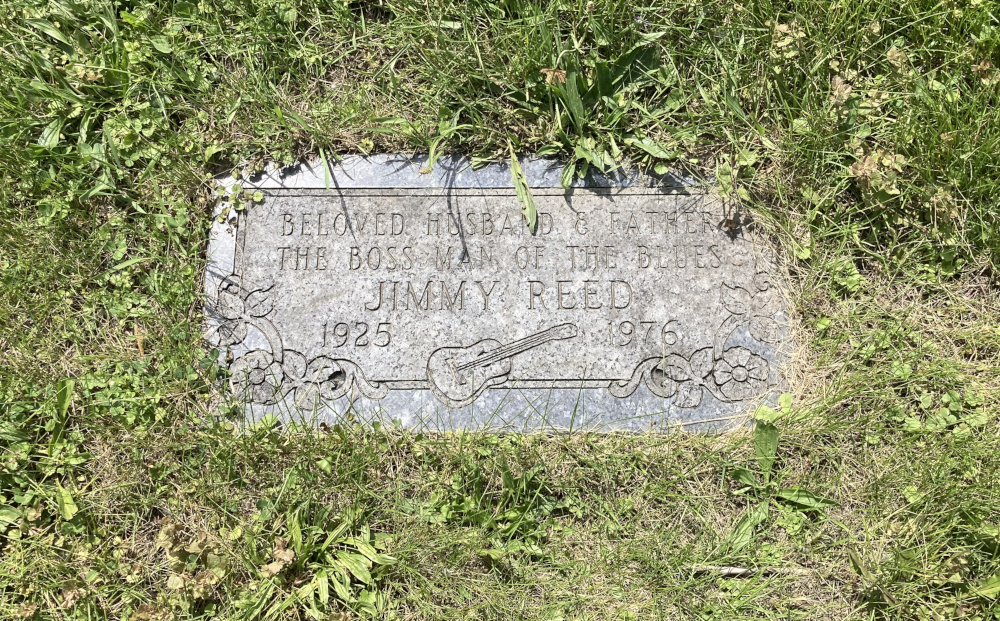
Reed's grave at Lincoln Cemetery

Reed died of respiratory failure in 1976, in Oakland, California, eight days short of his 51st birthday. He is interred in the Lincoln Cemetery, in Blue Island, Illinois. Reed was posthumously inducted into the Blues Hall of Fame in 1980, and the Rock and Roll Hall of Fame in 1991.

== Influence ==
The Rolling Stones have cited Reed as a major influence on their sound, and their early set lists included Reed's songs "Ain't That Lovin' You Baby", "The Sun Is Shining" (played by the Stones at the 1969 Altamont concert), "Bright Lights, Big City", and "Shame, Shame, Shame". "Little by Little", the B-side of their February 1964 UK hit single "Not Fade Away" was a pastiche of "Shame, Shame, Shame". "Honest I Do" was included on their first album, The Rolling Stones (subtitled England's Newest Hit Makers in America), in 1964 (the U.S. edition also included "Little by Little"). For their 2016 release, Blue & Lonesome, they recorded a version of Reed's "Little Rain".

The Yardbirds recorded "I Ain't Got You" for the B-side of their second single "Good Morning Little Schoolgirl" with guitarist Eric Clapton. With Jeff Beck, they recorded the Reed-inspired instrumental "Like Jimmy Reed Again", which was released on a reissue of their album Having a Rave Up. The Animals considered Reed one of their main sources of inspiration and recorded versions of "I Ain't Got You" and "Bright Lights, Big City". Van Morrison's group Them covered "Bright Lights, Big City" and "Baby, What You Want Me to Do", both of which are on the album The Story of Them Featuring Van Morrison. "Big Boss Man", sung by Ron "Pigpen" McKernan, was regularly performed by the Grateful Dead in the 1960s and early 1970s and appears on their live album Grateful Dead.

Elvis Presley recorded several of Reed's songs, having a hit with "Big Boss Man" in 1967 and recording several performances of "Baby, What You Want Me to Do" for his 1968 TV program. (Presley's 1964 hit "Ain't That Lovin' You Baby" is a different song from that recorded by Reed.) "Baby, What You Want Me to Do" was also covered by Wishbone Ash on their 1973 album Live Dates. Johnny and Edgar Winter performed it live in 1975 and included it on their album Together. Omar Kent Dykes and Jimmie Vaughan released the album On the Jimmy Reed Highway as a tribute to Reed. Bill Cosby covered four of Reed's songs, "Bright Lights, Big City", "Big Boss Man", "Hush Hush" and "Aw Shucks, Hush Your Mouth", for his 1967 album, Silver Throat: Bill Cosby Sings.

The Steve Miller Band covered five of Reed's songs: "You're So Fine" (originally recorded by Reed as "Honey, Where You Going?"), on the 1968 album Sailor, and "I Wanna Be Loved (But by Only You)", "Big Boss Man", "Caress Me Baby" and "Ain't That Lovin' You Baby", on the 1986 album Living in the 20th Century.

Bob Dylan paid tribute to Reed with the song "Goodbye Jimmy Reed" on his 2020 album Rough and Rowdy Ways.

== Discography ==
=== Singles ===
| Year | Single (A-side, B-side) Both sides from same album except where indicated | U.S. R&B | U.S. | Album |
|---|---|---|---|---|
| 1953 | "High and Lonesome" b/w "Roll and Rhumba" (from I'm Jimmy Reed) | — | — | The Legend – The Man |
| 1954 | "Jimmie's Boogie" b/w "I Found My Baby" | — | — | Non-album tracks |
| 1955 | "You Don't Have to Go" b/w "Boogie in the Dark" | 5 | — | I'm Jimmy Reed |
| 1955 | "I'm Gonna Ruin You" b/w "Pretty Thing" | — | — | Non-album tracks |
| 1955 | "I Don't Go for That" b/w "She Don't Want Me No More" | 12 | — | Non-album tracks |
| 1956 | "Ain't That Lovin' You Baby" b/w "Baby, Don't Say That No More" (from History of Jimmy Reed) | 3 | — | I'm Jimmy Reed |
| 1956 | "Can't Stand to See You Go" b/w "Rockin' with Reed" (from Rockin' with Reed) | 10 | — | I'm Jimmy Reed |
| 1956 | "I Love You Baby" b/w "My First Plea" (from I'm Jimmy Reed) | 13 | — | Non-album track |
| 1956 | "You've Got Me Dizzy" b/w "Honey Don't Let Me Go" (non-album track) | 3 | — | I'm Jimmy Reed |
| 1957 | "Little Rain" / | 7 | — | I'm Jimmy Reed |
| 1957 | "Honey, Where You Going?" | 10 | — | Non-album track |
| 1957 | "The Sun Is Shining" b/w "Baby, What's on Your Mind" (from Rockin' with Reed) | 12 | 65 | The Best of Jimmy Reed |
| 1957 | "Honest I Do" b/w "Signals of Love" (non-album track) | 4 | 32 | I'm Jimmy Reed |
| 1958 | "You're Something Else" b/w "A String to Your Heart" (from Rockin' with Reed) | — | — | I'm Jimmy Reed |
| 1958 | "You Got Me Crying" b/w "Go On to School" | — | — | I'm Jimmy Reed |
| 1958 | "I'm Gonna Get My Baby" b/w "Odds and Ends" (from Jimmy Reed with More of the Best) | 5 | — | Non-album track |
| 1958 | "Down in Virginia" b/w "I Know It's a Sin" | — | 93 | Rockin' with Reed |
| 1959 | "I Told You Baby" b/w "Ends and Odds" (from Rockin' with Reed) | 19 | — | Blues Is My Business |
| 1959 | "Take Out Some Insurance" b/w "You Know I Love You" (from History of Jimmy Reed) | — | — | Rockin' with Reed |
| 1959 | "Going to New York" b/w "I Wanna Be Loved" | — | — | Rockin' with Reed |
| 1960 | "Baby What You Want Me to Do" b/w "Caress Me Baby" (from Rockin' with Reed) | 10 | 37 | Found Love |
| 1960 | "Found Love" b/w "Where Can You Be" | 16 | 88 | Found Love |
| 1960 | "Hush-Hush" b/w "Going by the River", Part 2 | 18 | 75 | Found Love |
| 1961 | "Close Together" b/w "Laughing At the Blues" | 12 | 68 | Now Appearing |
| 1961 | "Big Boss Man" b/w "I'm a Love You" (from Jimmy Reed at Carnegie Hall) | 13 | 78 | Found Love |
| 1961 | "Bright Lights, Big City" b/w "I'm Mr. Luck" | 3 | 58 | Jimmy Reed at Carnegie Hall |
| 1962 | "Aw Shucks, Hush Your Mouth" b/w "Baby What's Wrong" | — | 93 | Jimmy Reed at Carnegie Hall |
| 1962 | "Good Lover" b/w "Tell Me You Love Me" (from Jimmy Reed At Carnegie Hall) | — | 77 | Just Jimmy Reed |
| 1962 | "Too Much" b/w "I'll Change My Style" (non-album track) | — | — | Just Jimmy Reed |
| 1962 | "Oh John" b/w "Let's Get Together" | — | — | Just Jimmy Reed |
| 1963 | "Shame, Shame, Shame" b/w "There'll Be a Day" | — | 52 | T'aint No Big Thing but He Is... |
| 1963 | "Mary Mary" b/w "I'm Gonna Help You" | — | — | T'aint No Big Thing but He Is... |
| 1963 | "Outskirts of Town" b/w "St. Louis Blues" | — | — | Jimmy Reed Sings the Best of the Blues |
| 1964 | "Help Yourself" b/w "Heading for a Fall" (non-album track) | — | — | Jimmy Reed at Soul City |
| 1964 | "Down in Mississippi" b/w "Oh John" (from Just Jimmy Reed) | — | — | Jimmy Reed with More of the Best |
| 1964 | "I'm Going Upside Your Head" b/w "The Devil's Shoestring", Part 2 | — | — | Jimmy Reed at Soul City |
| 1964 | "I Wanna Be Loved" b/w "A New Leaf" | — | — | Jimmy Reed at Soul City |
| 1965 | "Left Handed Woman" b/w "I'm The Man Down There" (from History of Jimmy Reed) | — | — | Jimmy Reed at Soul City |
| 1965 | "When Girls Do It" b/w "Don't Think I'm Through" | — | — | Non-album tracks |
| 1966 | "Knockin' at Your Door" b/w "Dedication to Sonny Boy Williamson" | 39 | — | Soulin' |
| 1966 | "Cousin Peaches" b/w "Crazy 'Bout Oklahoma" | — | — | Soulin' |
| 1966 | "Got Nowhere to Go" b/w "Two Ways to Skin (A Cat)" | — | — | The New Jimmy Reed Album |
| 1967 | "I Wanna Know" b/w "Two Heads Better Than One" | — | — | The New Jimmy Reed Album |
| 1967 | "Don't Press Your Luck Woman" b/w "Feel Like I Want to Ramble" | — | — | Soulin' |
| 1967 | "Crazy About Oklahoma" b/w "Buy Me a Hound Dog" | — | — | Soulin' |
| 1968 | "My Baby Told Me" b/w "Peepin 'n Hidin" (from Soulin') | — | — | Big Boss Man |
| 1969 | "Don't Light My Fire" b/w "The Judge Should Know" | — | — | Down in Virginia |
| 1970 | "Hard Walkin' Hanna", Part 1 b/w "Hard Walkin' Hanna", Part 2 | — | — | As Jimmy Is |
| 1970 | "Crying Blind" b/w "Christmas Present Blues" | — | — | As Jimmy Is |
| 1971 | "Big Legged Woman" b/w "Funky Funky Soul" | — | — | As Jimmy Is |
| 1971 | "Cold Chills" b/w "You're Just a Womper Stomper" | — | — | Let the Bossman Speak! |

=== Albums ===
| Year | Album | Peak chart positions |
| Year | Album | US 200 |
|---|---|---|
| 1958 | I'm Jimmy Reed | — |
| 1959 | 'Rockin' with Reed | — |
| 1960 | Found Love | — |
| 1960 | Now Appearing | — |
| 1961 | Jimmy Reed at Carnegie Hall [2LP] | 46 |
| 1962 | Just Jimmy Reed | 100 |
| 1963 | T'ain't No Big Thing but He Is...Jimmy Reed | — |
| 1963 | Jimmy Reed Sings the Best of the Blues | — |
| 1963 | Jimmy Reed Plays 12 String Guitar Blues | — |
| 1964 | Jimmy Reed with More of the Best | — |
| 1967 | The New Jimmy Reed Album | — |
| 1967 | Soulin' | — |
| 1968 | Big Boss Man | — |
| 1969 | Down in Virginia | — |
| 1970 | As Jimmy Is (AKA Hard Walking Hanna) | — |
| 1971 | Let the Bossman Speak! (AKA Cold Chills) | — |
| 1973 | I Ain't from Chicago | — |
| 1974 | Blues is My Business | — |

==== Compilation albums ====
| Year | Album |
|---|---|
| 1962 | The Best of Jimmy Reed |
| 1964 | Jimmy Reed at Soul City |
| 1965 | The Legend – The Man |
| 1972 | History of Jimmy Reed [2LP] |
| 1976 | Jimmy Reed is Back |
| 1980 | Upside Your Head (Charly CRB-1003) |
| 1981 | High and Lonesome (Charly CRB-1013) |
| 1981 | Got Me Dizzy (Charly CRB-1028) |
| 1983 | Shame Shame Shame (Krazy Kat KK 781) |
| 1984 | Cold Chills (Krazy Kat KK 786) |
| 1985 | I'm the Man Down There (Charly CRB-1082) |
| 1993 | Speak the Lyrics to Me, Mama Reed (Vee Jay NVD2-705) |

== See also ==
- Blues harp
- List of blues musicians
- List of people from Mississippi
- List of people with epilepsy
