= Son of Gutbucket =

Compilation album by Various artists
- Released: 1969
- Genre: Rock, blues
- Label: Liberty LBX/4
- Producer: Various

Series chronology
Gutbucket (1969)	Son of Gutbucket (1969)

Son of Gutbucket is a 1969 sampler album released to promote artists on the Liberty Records label. It followed the earlier release in 1969 of Gutbucket (subtitled An Underworld Eruption). The album was listed on the Top 30 Album charts.

== Track listing ==
=== Side 1 ===
1. "Bootleg" - Creedence Clearwater Revival - from the LP Bayou Country
2. "My Babe She Ain't Nothing but a Doggone Crazy Fool Mumble" - Ian Anderson's Country Blues Band - from the LP Stereo Death Breakdown
3. "I Got Love If You Want It" - Johnny Winter - from the LP The Progressive Blues Experiment
4. "Preparation G" - T.I.M.E. - from the LP Smooth Ball
5. "Walking Down Their Outlook" - High Tide - from the LP Sea Shanties
6. "Oh Death" - Jo-Ann Kelly & Tony McPhee - from the LP I Asked for Water, She Gave Me Gasoline
7. "Don't Mean a Thing" - Floating Bridge - from the LP Floating Bridge
8. "Sergeant Sunshine" - Roy Harper - from the LP Folkjokeopus
9. "Mistreated" - The Groundhogs - from the LP Blues Obituary

=== Side 2 ===
1. "Sic 'Em Pigs" - Canned Heat - from the LP Hallelujah
2. "Hard Headed Woman" - Andy Fernbach - from the LP If You Miss Your Connexion
3. "T.B. Blues" - McKenna Mendelson Mainline - from the LP Stink
4. "Sunshine Possibilities" - Famous Jug Band - from the LP Sunshine Possibilities
5. "Hurry Up John" - Idle Race - from the LP Idle Race
6. "I'm So Tired" - Brett Marvin and the Thunderbolts - from the LP I Asked for Water, She Gave Me Gasoline
7. "Leavin' My Home" - T.I.M.E. - from the LP Smooth Ball
8. "Sugar on the Line" - Aynsley Dunbar Retaliation - from the LP To Mum - From Aynsley & The Boys
