= Live at Leeds '71 =

- Cover art of the 2002 EMI CD release

Live album by The Groundhogs
- Released: 1971 (Promo LP); August 1998 (Akarma); 2002 (EMI)
- Recorded: April 13, 1971
- Venue: Leeds University
- Genre: Blues rock
- Length: 36:38
- Label: Akarma, EMI

Professional ratings
Review scores
Source	Rating
AllMusic	4.5/5 stars

Live at Leeds '71 is a live album by The Groundhogs. It records the show at The Rolling Stones UK Tour 1971. It started as a promo release in 1971. 100 copies were sent out to US radio stations. The live set was documented and pressed in a very limited edition at the behest of Mick Jagger. It was reissued as a part of 1984's "Hogging the Stage" album and reissued separately in Italy in 1998 and got EU release by EMI in 2002.

== Track listing ==
No.	Title	Writer(s)	Length
1.	"Cherry Red" (from ‘’Split‘’, 1971)	Tony McPhee	6:23
2.	"Garden" (from ‘’Thank Christ for the Bomb‘’, 1970)	McPhee	6:14
3.	"Split, Pt. One" (from ‘‘Split’’, 1971)	McPhee	7:26
4.	"Groundhog Blues" (from ‘‘Split’’, 1971)	Trad. arr. by McPhee	5:10
5.	"Eccentric Man" (from ‘‘Thank Christ for the Bomb’’, 1970)	McPhee	11:25

== Personnel ==
The Groundhogs

- Tony McPhee – guitars, vocals
- Peter Cruickshank – bass
- Ken Pustelnik – drums

Production

- Engineer – Glyn Johns
- Liner notes – Tony McPhee
