= Who Will Save the World? =

Who Will Save the World? The Mighty Groundhogs

Studio album by The Groundhogs
- Released: 3 March 1972
- Recorded: January 1972
- Studio: De Lane Lea Studios, Wembley
- Genre: Blues rock; progressive rock
- Length: 36:40
- Label: United Artists
- Producer: Tony (T.S.) McPhee

The Groundhogs chronology
Split (1971)	Who Will Save the World? The Mighty Groundhogs (1972)	Hogwash (1972)

Who Will Save the World? The Mighty Groundhogs is a 1972 album recorded by The Groundhogs, originally released by United Artists Records in 1972, catalogue number UAS-5570. The most recent CD reissue is that of 2003 by EMI Records, catalogue number 07243-584815-2-5.

The sleeve artwork takes the form of a comic book featuring the Groundhogs depicted as superheroes, drawn by comic book artist Neal Adams. In the story they fight the personified evils of Over-Population, Pollution, War, "Pig Business" and "Sacred Cow" (Religion), and the Junkie Monkey. Each of the band members takes on a different evil thwarting them to begin with only to have them spin off and wreak havoc on another portion of the globe. The lyrics of each song deal with these themes and despite the comic-book nature of the cover, the lyrics are quite serious being politically and socially motivated.

This was the first Groundhogs album to venture beyond guitar/bass/drums instrumentation, with McPhee utilising keyboards (mellotron and harmonium) on a number of the tracks.

== Track listing ==
All tracks composed by Tony McPhee; except where indicated

1. "Earth Is Not Room Enough" - 4:45
2. "Wages of Peace" - 4:33
3. "Body in Mind" - 3:45
4. "Music is the Food of Thought" - 4:30
5. "Bog Roll Blues" - 3:02
6. "Death of the Sun" - 3:40
7. "Amazing Grace" (Traditional) - 2:20
8. "The Grey Maze" - 10:05

== Personnel ==
The Groundhogs

- Tony McPhee – guitars, mellotron, harmonium, vocals
- Peter Cruikshank – bass
- Ken Pustelnik – drums

Technical

- Martin Birch, Louis Austin – engineer
- Neal Adams – artwork
