= Blues Anytime =

- Vol. 1 British cover (2006 reissue)

Compilation album by Various Artists
- Released: 1968–1969
- Genre: British blues
- Label: Immediate Records
- Producer: Mike Vernon

Alternate cover
- Vol. 1 American cover (2006 reissue)

Blues Anytime: An Anthology of British Blues is a series of compilation albums featuring tracks from various British blues artists. Three volumes were released by Immediate Records in 1968, followed by Blues Leftovers in 1969.

The albums feature various tracks from such artists as John Mayall, Tony McPhee, Savoy Brown Blues Band, Jo Ann Kelly, Jeremy Spencer, Cyril Davies, Stuff Smith, Albert Lee, Dave Kelly and Rod Stewart and were also the first release of several exclusive tracks recorded for Immediate between 1965 and '67. These include recordings by Jimmy Page with Jeff Beck, Nicky Hopkins and the All-Stars, plus seven instrumentals recorded by Page and Eric Clapton, backed by members of The Rolling Stones (Bill Wyman, bass, Mick Jagger, harmonica and Ian Stewart, keyboard) and the only recorded output by Santa Barbara Machine Head.

== Reissues ==
When Immediate initially released the original Blues Anytime albums in the USA, the first two volumes were simply titled An Anthology of British Blues, with the third volume renamed as The Beginning: British Blues.

The Blues Anytime tracks were released again by Immediate in 1969 as two double albums titled Anthology of British Blues, albeit presented in a different running order. The first was made up of Vol. 1 side A, Leftovers side A, Vol. 3 side A and Vol. 2 side B, with the second being Vol. 1 side B, Leftovers side B, Vol. 2 side A and Vol. 3 side B.

In 1970, after the dissolution of Immediate Records, RCA Victor reissued the original Blues Anytime albums under the name British Archive Series: Blues for Collectors Vol. 1–4,. A compilation of tracks from this series was released by RCA as Eric Clapton, Jeff Beck, Jimmy Page: Guitar Boogie (1971)

In 1986, Line Records in Germany released the complete four-album-series as box set

1986's White Boy Blues, Volumes 1 and 2 (Castle Communications), is largely made up of Blues Anytime.

In 1996, Charly Records released a 3CD box set titled The Immediate Blues Anthology; the first two discs covering the tracks from Blues Anytime Vol. 1, Vol. 2, Vol. 3 and Leftovers presented in their original running order, with the third disc made up of other assorted tracks from the Immediate archives.

The original series was reissued again in 2006 by JVC in Japan, released across two CDs presented in mini LP sleeve replicas with obi strips. The first, titled Blues Anytime I, combined the tracks from the original Blues Anytime Vol.1 and Vol. 2, using the original British artwork from Vol. 1 as its cover art. The second, Blues Anytime II, combined the tracks from the original Blues Anytime Vol. 3 and Blues Leftovers, but used the original American cover art from Vol. 1 on the front and the cover from Leftovers on the back.

== Track listings ==
=== Blues Anytime Vol. 1 ===
Immediate IMLP 014
No.	Title	Artist(s)	Length
1.	"I'm Your Witchdoctor"	John Mayall and the Bluesbreakers	2:11
2.	"Snake Drive"	Eric Clapton	2:29
3.	"Ain't Gonna Cry No More"	T.S. McPhee	3:06
4.	"I Tried"	Savoy Brown Blues Band	3:03
5.	"Tribute to Elmore"	Eric Clapton and Jimmy Page	2:09
6.	"I Feel So Good"	Jo Ann Kelly	2:53
7.	"Telephone Blues"	John Mayall and the Bluesbreakers	3:57
8.	"You Don't Love Me"	T.S. McPhee	2:24
9.	"West Coast Idea"	Eric Clapton	2:19
10.	"Ain't Seen No Whisky"	Jo Ann Kelly	2:58
11.	"Flapjacks"	Stone's Masonry	2:43
12.	"Cold Blooded Woman"	Savoy Brown Blues Band	3:50
Total length:			34:06

=== Blues Anytime Vol. 2 ===
Immediate IMCP 015
No.	Title	Artist(s)	Length
1.	"On Top of the World"	John Mayall and the Bluesbreakers	2:49
2.	"Someone to Love Me"	T.S. McPhee	2:21
3.	"Can't Quit You Baby"	Savoy Brown Blues Band	3:38
4.	"Draggin' My Tail"	Eric Clapton and Jimmy Page	3:08
5.	"Dealing with the Devil"	Dharma Blues Band	3:16
6.	"Who's Knocking"	Jeremy Spencer	2:35
7.	"Freight Loader"	Eric Clapton and Jimmy Page	2:48
8.	"Look Down at My Woman"	Jeremy Spencer	3:04
9.	"Roll 'Em Pete"	Dharma Blues Band	2:09
10.	"Choker"	Eric Clapton and Jimmy Page	1:26
11.	"True Blue"	Savoy Brown Blues Band	4:03
12.	"When You Got a Good Friend"	T.S. McPhee	2:32
Total length:			33:49

=== Blues Anytime Vol. 3 ===
Immediate IMLP 019
No.	Title	Artist(s)	Length
1.	"Someday Baby"	Cyril Davies and the All-Stars	2:50
2.	"Steelin'"	The All-Stars featuring Jeff Beck	2:39
3.	"L.A. Breakdown"	The All-Stars featuring Jimmy Page	2:06
4.	"Chuckles"	The All-Stars featuring Jeff Beck	2:24
5.	"Down in the Boots"	The All-Stars featuring Jimmy Page	3:26
6.	"Piano Shuffle"	The All-Stars featuring Nicky Hopkins	3:00
7.	"Miles Road"	Eric Clapton and Jimmy Page	2:26
8.	"Porcupine Juice"	Santa Barbara Machine Head	3:15
9.	"Albert"	Santa Barbara Machine Head	3:21
10.	"Rubber Monkey"	Santa Barbara Machine Head	2:39
11.	"Howlin' for My Darling"	Stuff Smith	3:25
Total length:			31:31

=== Blues Leftovers ===
Immediate IMLP 024
No.	Title	Artist(s)	Length
1.	"The Next Milestone"	Albert Lee	3:55
2.	"Somebody's Gonna Get Their Head Kicked In Tonight"	Earl Vince and the Valiants	2:49
3.	"New Death Matter"	Dave Kelly	3:31
4.	"Back Water Blues"	Jo Ann Kelly	3:16
5.	"So Much to Say"	Rod Stewart	3:15
6.	"Married Woman Blues"	Dave Kelly	3:41
7.	"Water on My Fire"	Albert Lee	3:30
8.	"Keep Your Hands Out of My Pockets"	Jo Ann Kelly	2:47
9.	"Alabama Woman"	Dave Kelly	3:49
10.	"Crosstown Link"	Albert Lee	3:50
11.	"All Night Long"	Dave Kelly	2:05
12.	"Down and Dirty"	Simon and Steve	2:43
Total length:			39:11
