= Back to the Story =

Compilation album by The Idle Race
- Released: 1996; Re-released 2007 & 2013
- Recorded: 1968–1971
- Genre: Psychedelic rock, rock music
- Label: EMI
- Producer: Eddie Offord & Gerald Chevin; Jeff Lynne; Noel Walker; The Idle Race & Kenneth Young

The Idle Race chronology
Time Is (1971)	Back to the Story (1996)

Professional ratings
Review scores
Source	Rating
Allmusic	4.5/5 stars

Back to the Story is a 2-CD compilation set by Sixties/Seventies band The Idle Race released in 1996 on EMI's short-lived Premier series. It contains all three official studio albums, non-album singles and B-sides. The original edition's second CD included the earliest known tracks featuring Jeff Lynne in The Nightriders. In 2007, the set was re-released on EMI's newly reconstituted Zonophone label minus the Nightriders tracks. In 2013 the compilation was again re-released, this time on Warner Music Group's Parlophone label, also without the Nightriders tracks.

== Tracks ==
- CD One

(The Birthday Party)

1. The Skeleton And The Roundabout
2. Happy Birthday
3. The Birthday
4. I Like My Toys
5. Morning Sunshine
6. Follow Me Follow
7. Sitting In My Tree (mono)
8. On With The Show
9. Lucky Man
10. (Don't Put Your Boys In The Army) Mrs. Ward
11. Pie In The Sky
12. The Lady who Said She Could Fly
13. End Of The Road

(Idle Race)

1. Come With Me (rechanneled to simulate stereo)
2. Sea Of Dreams
3. Going Home
4. Reminds Me Of You
5. Mr. Crow and Sir Norman
6. Please No More Sad Songs
7. Girl At The Window
8. Big Chief Woolley Bosher
9. Someone Knocking
10. A Better Life (The Weather Man Knows)
11. Hurry Up John

Alternative Versions

1. Lucky Man (mono)
2. Follow Me Follow (mono)
3. Days Of Broken Arrows (mono)
- CD Two

(Non-album tracks)

1. (Here We Go 'Round) The Lemon Tree (mono)
2. My Father's Son (mono)
3. Imposters Of Life's Magazine (mono)
4. Knocking Nails Into My House (mono)
5. Days Of The Broken Arrows (mono)
6. Worn Red Carpet (mono)
7. In The Summertime
8. Told You Twice
9. Neanderthal Man (rechanneled to simulate stereo)
10. Victim Of Circumstance (rechanneled to simulate stereo)

(Time Is)

1. Dancing Flower
2. Sad O'Sad
3. The Clock
4. I Will See You
5. By The Sun
6. Alcatraz
7. And The Rain
8. She Sang Hymns Out Of Tune
9. Bitter Green
10. We Want It All
- 21. It's Only the Dog (mono)
- 22. Your Friend (mono)
- These last two tracks by The Nightriders appear only on the original 1996 release
