= Gutbucket (album) =

Compilation album by Various Artists
- Released: 1969
- Genre: Rock, blues
- Label: Liberty LBX/3
- Producer: Various

Series chronology
Gutbucket (1969)	Son of Gutbucket (1969)

Gutbucket (An Underworld Eruption) is a 1969 sampler album released to promote artists on the Liberty Records label. It was followed later in 1969 by Son of Gutbucket. Both albums were reissued on a single EMI CD in 1994, with an informative booklet, but with 6 of the original 31 tracks (from the combined albums) missing.

== Track listing ==
=== Side 1 ===
1. "Gimme Dat Harp Boy" - Captain Beefheart and His Magic Band - from the LP Strictly Personal
2. "The Wall" - Hapshash and the Coloured Coat - from the LP The Western Flier
3. "You’re Gonna Miss Me" - Lightnin' Hopkins - from the LP Earth Blues
4. "I’m Tore Down" - Alexis Korner - from the LP A New Generation of Blues
5. "Still a Fool" - Groundhogs - from the LP Scratching the Surface
6. "Dismal Swamp" - Nitty Gritty Dirt Band - from the LP Pure Dirt
7. "Wine, Women & Whisky" - Papa Lightfoot - from the LP Rural Blues Vol 2

=== Side two ===
1. "Pony Blues" - Canned Heat - from the LP Living the Blues
2. "Down in Texas" - The Hour Glass - from the LP The Hour Glass
3. "No More Doggin’" - Tony McPhee - from the LP Me And The Devil
4. "Can Blue Men Sing the Whites" - The Bonzo Dog Band - from the LP The Doughnut in Granny's Greenhouse
5. "Mamma Don’t Like Me Runnin Around" - Big Joe Williams - from the LP Hand Me Down My Old Walking Stick
6. "Rollin’ And Tumblin’" - Jo-Anne Kelly - from the LP Me And The Devil
7. "Call My Woman" - Aynsley Dunbar Retaliation - from the LP Dr. Dunbar’s Prescription
