= Solid (Groundhogs album) =

Studio album by the Groundhogs
- Released: June 1974
- Studio: Tony McPhee's home studio, Haverhill, Suffolk
- Genre: Blues rock; hard rock; progressive rock; psychedelic
- Length: 40.39
- Label: WWA Records/Vertigo
- Producer: Tony McPhee

The Groundhogs chronology
Hogwash (1972)	Solid (1974)	Crosscut Saw (1976)

Solid is a 1974 album recorded by the Groundhogs, originally released by WWA Records. It was arranged, composed, engineered and produced by band member Tony McPhee. It entered the UK album charts in July 1974 reaching number 31 but remained in the charts for only one week.

== Track listing ==
All tracks composed by Tony McPhee

1. "Light My Light" – 6:23
2. "Free from All Alarm" – 5:14
3. "Sins of the Father" – 5:29
4. "Sad Go Round" – 2:55
5. "Corn Cob" – 5:36
6. "Plea Sing, Plea Song" – 3:00
7. "Snow Storm" – 3:28
8. "Joker's Grave" – 8:41

== Personnel ==
The Groundhogs

- Tony McPhee – guitars, vocals
- Peter Cruikshank – bass
- Ken Pustelnik, Clive Brooks – drums

Technical

- Martin Birch – engineer
- Gered Mankowitz – photography

== Reception ==
- Allmusic
