= Scratching the Surface =

Scratching the Surface may refer to:

- Scratching the Surface (Groundhogs album), 1968
- Scratching the Surface (Rob Brown and Lou Grassi album), 1998
- Scratchin' the Surface, an album by Sav Killz, 2009
- "Scratchin' the Surface", a composition by Mitchell Ayres
- "Scratching the Surface", a song by Saga from Heads or Tales, 1983
- "Scratching the Surface" (Mayday), a 2009 television episode
