= Guitar Boogie =

Guitar Boogie may refer to:

- Arthur "Guitar Boogie" Smith (1921-2014), American guitarist and songwriter
- Guitar Boogie (album), by Eric Clapton, Jeff Beck, and Jimmy Page
- "Guitar Boogie" (song), by Arthur Smith, covered as "Guitar Boogie Shuffle" by The Virtues
