= B.D.D. =

Single by Groundhogs

from the album Blues Obituary
- B-side: "Gasoline"
- Released: 1969
- Genre: Blues, blues rock
- Length: 3.50
- Label: Liberty Records
- Songwriter: Tony McPhee
- Producer: Tony McPhee

"B.D.D." is a hit single by British group Groundhogs. Standing for "Blind, Deaf, Dumb" and taken from their 1969 album Blues Obituary, it was a commercial failure in the UK but made number one in Lebanon.
