= Scratching the Surface (Groundhogs album) =

Studio album by Groundhogs
- Released: December 1968
- Recorded: 5–13 October 1968
- Studio: Marquee Studios, London
- Genre: Blues, blues rock
- Length: 44:03
- Label: Liberty Records (original UK release); World Pacific (original US release); BGO (1990 & 2006 UK reissues); Akarma (1998 Italian reissue); Sundazed (2009 US reissue); Pure Pleasure (2015 UK reissue); Fire (2018 UK reissue)
- Producer: Mike Batt

Groundhogs chronology
Scratching the Surface (1968)	Blues Obituary (1969)

Scratching the Surface is the debut album by English band Groundhogs, released in 1968 by Liberty Records.

Dave Thompson at AllMusic commented "... if you want to hear the blues sluicing straight out of the Southern England Delta, there are precious few better introductions".

== Track listing ==
All tracks composed by Tony McPhee, except where indicated.

1. "Rocking Chair" – 4:07
2. "Early in the Morning" (John Lee Williamson) – 4:47
3. "Waking Blues" – 2:29
4. "Married Men" – 4:40
5. "No More Doggin'" (Rosco Gordon) – 4:57
6. "Man Trouble" – 6:27
7. "Come Back Baby" – 3:54
8. "You Don't Love Me" (Willie Cobbs) – 4:11
9. "Still a Fool" (McKinley Morganfield) – 6:35

1990 bonus tracks - Taken from I Asked for Water, She Gave Me… Gasoline compilation

1. "Oh Death" – 3:14 (credited to Jo Ann Kelly and Tony McPhee)
2. "Gasoline" – 4:49 (credited to Tony McPhee)
3. "Rock Me" – 2:46 (credited to Jo Ann Kelly and The Groundhogs)
4. "Don't Pass the Hat Around" – 3:43 (credited to Tony McPhee)

== Personnel ==
Groundhogs

- Tony McPhee – guitar, vocals
- Steve Rye – harmonica, vocals, lead vocals on tracks 2 and 8
- Peter Cruickshank – bass
- Ken Pustelnik – drums

Technical

- Gerry Collins – engineer
- Andrew Lauder, Roy Fisher, Tony McPhee – coordination
- Michael Hasted – design and cover photography
