= McKenna Mendelson Mainline =

Canadian blues band

- Origin: Toronto, Ontario, Canada
- Genre: Blues
- Years active: 1968–1975
- Labels: Liberty, GRT
- Past members: Mike McKenna; Joe Mendelson; Tony Nolasco; Timothy O'Leary; Denny Gerrard; Mike Harrison; Frank H. "Zeke" Sheppard; Edward "Ted" Wiliam Purdy; Rick James; Adam Mitchell; Bob Adams

McKenna Mendelson Mainline was a Canadian blues band that released four albums. In the spring of 1969, the band was signed to Liberty Records (United Artists).

== History ==
In the summer of 1968, in May, Toronto, Ontario, Canada blues guitarist Mike McKenna (born April 15, 1946, in Toronto), formerly of Luke & The Apostles, placed an ad in The Toronto Star seeking musicians for a new project. In replying to the ad, acoustic blues artist Joe Mendelson (born July 30, 1944, in Toronto, died February 7, 2023, in Toronto) suggested to McKenna that the idea of searching for blues musicians through the want ad milieu was an exercise in naïveté. Nevertheless, the two worked well creatively and the basis of McKenna Mendelson Mainline's dynasty was formed.

=== Original band members ===
The Spassticks' Tony Nolasco (born July 9, 1950, in Sudbury, Ontario) was also recruited, along with American bass player Timothy O'Leary, who was dumped in the first month. Former The Paupers bassist Denny Gerrard (born February 27, 1948, in Scarborough, Ontario) was invited to join, completing the quartet. The band debuted at the Night Owl club in Toronto's Yorkville Village from August 5–10 and the following month recorded demos which later became the basis of a bootleg album, McKenna Mendelson Blues. Gerrard left the band in early October immediately after a show at Massey Hall supporting The Fugs because of artistic differences and was replaced by Mike Harrison (born November 1, 1948, in Brampton, Ontario), bassist from popular Canadian R&B band Grant Smith & The Power

In November 1968, MMM opened for The Jeff Beck Group at the Grande Ballroom in Detroit, Michigan, and garnered several standing ovations.

=== Early success in the UK ===
In December 1968, MMM reversed the trend of English bands coming to North America, and proceeded to England to gig and hopefully to pursue a major record deal. The band hit the stage almost immediately, their first show being at the Utrecht Pop Festival on December 27/28, 1968, filling a prime timeslot just vacated by Jimi Hendrix and his duo (Noel Redding and Mitch Mitchell). MMM started soon thereafter gigging on an English club circuit which included such notables as The Bonzo Dog Doo-Dah Band, Family, The Keef Hartley Band, Gun, and the newly formed Led Zeppelin.

After several false starts, they signed with Liberty/United Artists in the spring of 1969, and in April 1969 recorded a best-selling album, Stink. It was subsequently reissued on CD.

=== Back to Canada ===
Homesickness, dissension in the ranks, and the vagaries of youth facilitated a return to Canada in June 1969. Shortly after the July 1969 release of Stink, Allied Records released the demos recorded in September 1968 as McKenna Mendelson Blues. MMM thus became Canada's first "major label" act to be the victim of a bootlegged album. However, while in Europe and England selections from the Stink album appeared on various blues samplers and compilations, notably Liberty's Gutbucket (1969), subtitled 'An Underworld Eruption', and Son of Gutbucket (1969).

=== GRT signing and 1971 album ===
Following Stink, and a brief hiatus resulting from the internal dissension, the band reformed with Zeke Sheppard on bass and was signed in Canada by GRT Records. In 1971, Mainline recorded a second studio album, Canada Our Home and Native Land in San Francisco. The album featured horn arrangements on some tracks and was engineered by Fred Catero, who worked on many albums by top artists, including Bob Dylan, Al Kooper, and Santana. The album had more of a production sheen than the Stink album, owing perhaps to the California influence and that of its producer Adam Mitchell, formerly of the Paupers. The subsequent supporting tour included dates in Australia.

=== The Mainline Bump 'n Grind Revue ===
In late 1971, Zeke Sheppard moved on to other things and the band, again by newspaper advertisement, hired Ted Purdy to take over the mantle of bass player for the otherwise intact band. In February 1972, the band recorded a live album featuring striptease artists at the run-down Victory Theatre, a vintage Toronto burlesque venue. The resulting album, The Mainline Bump 'n Grind Revue was mixed at Moses Znaimer's Thunder Sound studios, long before Znaimer gained notoriety as the founder of CITY-TV. The album was recorded by Jay Messina and Jack Douglas on the Record Plant mobile studio out of New York City. Messina and Douglas later engineered the likes of John Lennon, Aerosmith, and Lou Reed. The Record Plant mobile encountered difficulties crossing the border due to customs officers' unfamiliarity with high-tech equipment of such nature being packed into a truck, with the result that there were only a couple of hours to do a complete sound check prior to the performance. This difficulty was compounded by the fact that the band was in an advanced state of inebriation from drugs and alcohol, and consequently played at much higher volume during the performance than they had during the sound check. As a result, most of the individual instrument and vocal tracks were too distorted to be useful, which left only the house stereo pair for mixing. The mixing sessions at Thunder Sound were therefore quite protracted, and studio back-up vocal and horn tracks were added to buttress the live tracks. Despite the technical shortcomings of the recording, the concert became the stuff of minor legend with its combination of hard-driving covers of blues classics and the estimable performances of talented striptease performers. The tribute to vaudevillian burlesque form was completed by the use of a comedian as opening act and MC and the formal dinner-jacketed, tuxedoed attire of the band members. The 1972 Bump n Grind Revue is sometimes confused with a later burlesque show that the band performed at the Victory Theatre on New Year's Eve, 1974. That concert was recorded on video by TV Ontario, a public broadcaster, but was not the subject of a major label album release.

=== Breakups and reunions ===
By June 1972, Mendelson's continuing differences with McKenna led to his departure from the band. The band continued without him, typically billed as "The Mainline". Mendelson's place was taken by the up-and-coming talent of Rick James, who would go on to great fame with multiple platinum albums for Motown and singles such as "Super Freak". The funk/R&B stage presence of James seemed a mismatch for the sitting down heavy blues signature of the band, but the formula worked, with large receptive crowds in venues such as Carleton and Dalhousie Universities. Eventually, however, the reconstituted band fell apart when James left the band and Nolasco pursued a record deal for what he viewed as a super-talented performer in Rick James—a goal that Nolasco would ultimately achieve in 1978 with the release of James' debut album, Come Get It!.

After Mendelson left the band he pursued a solo career. In 1975, Mendelson was signed by Taurus Records to record a studio album with producer Adam Mitchell (of The Paupers). Released as Sophisto, the album was not a commercial success, so the label instead pursued a project in which Mendelson and McKenna, joined by Mitchell, would reunite and record a Mainline reunion album. This led to the album No Substitute released the same year credited to "Mainline Featuring Joe Mendelson and Michael McKenna." The sessions were rancorous with Mendelson at his dictatorial best and the album was, unsurprisingly, a failure. This was to be the last recording featuring Mendelson and McKenna as bandmates.

Changing his name to Mendelson Joe, Mendelson returned to his solo career, joined by former MMM bandmate Ted Purdy, who worked with Joe on several of his early solo albums as musician and co-producer.

=== Mainline today ===
The Mainline reunited in the 1990s without Mendelson, but with Mike McKenna (guitar, slide guitar, vocals), Tony Nolasco (drums, lead vocals), Mike Harrison (bass, vocals), Ted Purdy (acoustic guitar, vocals), and Bob Adams (harmonica). This group played regularly into the 2000s, including to a sold-out crowd at the last ever show at the El Mocambo Tavern, later released by Bullseye Records as the album Last Show @ The Elmo. To date, their final show was at the Black Swan Tavern On April 25, 2009, celebrating McKenna's 45 years on the Toronto music scene.

Mainline's albums today remain available on music streaming services such as Apple Music and Spotify.

Frank "Zeke" Sheppard died of lung cancer on October 10, 1997, at the age of 56.

Mike Harrison died on January 7, 2022, at the age of 74, after suffering a stroke in late 2021.

Mendelson Joe, after five years suffering from Parkinsons Disease, chose an assisted death on February 7, 2023, at the age of 78.

== Discography ==
=== Albums ===
- 1969 Stink (Liberty/United Artists)
- 1969 McKenna Mendelson Mainline Blues (Paragon/Allied); 1996 CD re-issue (Pacemaker Entertainment)
- 1971 Canada Our Home & Native Land (GRT Records) 1996 CD re-issue (Pacemaker Entertainment)
- 1972 Mainline Bump 'n Grind Revue - Live at the Victory Theatre (GRT Records) 1996 CD re-issue (Pacemaker Entertainment)
- 1975 No Substitute (Taurus Records) 2017 CD re-issue (Pacemaker Entertainment)
- 2001 Last Show @ The Elmo (Bullseye Record)

=== Singles ===
- A: One Way Ticket / B: Beltmaker Liberty 1969
- A: Better Watch Out / B: She's Alright Liberty 5 Jul 1969
- A: She's Alright / B: Mainline Liberty 1969
- A: Don't Give Me No Goose For Christmas Grandma / B: Beltmaker Liberty Dec 1969
- A: Think I'm Losing My Marbles / B: Drive You Liberty May 1970
- A: Get Down To / B: Pedalictus Rag GRT 1971
- A: Ezmeralda / B: Game of Love GRT 1972
