= Hogwash =

Hogwash or hog wash may refer to:

- Pig swill, food for pigs in liquid or partly liquid form
- Slang for "nonsense", communication that lacks any coherent meaning

== Albums, songs, and books ==
- Hogwash (album), 1972 blues-rock album by UK band the Groundhogs
- "Hog Wash", 1953 song by American musician Louis Jordan
- "Hogwash", song on 1994 album The Tussler – Original Motion Picture Soundtrack by Norwegian band Motorpsycho
- "Hogwash", song on 1997 album The Action Is Go by American band Fu Manchu
- The Hog's Wholey Wash, 2002 book by Mal Mitchell
- Hog Wash, 2010 book by American musician Bryan Duncan
