= ...And Seven Nights =

Studio album by John Lee Hooker
- Released: 1965
- Recorded: November 1964
- Studio: IBC Studios, London
- Genre: Blues
- Length: 40:50
- Label: Verve Folkways
- Producer: Jerry Schoenbaum

John Lee Hooker chronology
| Concert at Newport (1964) | ...And Seven Nights (1965) | It Serve You Right to Suffer (1966) |

...And Seven Nights is an album by the blues musician John Lee Hooker. It was recorded in London in 1964 and released by the Verve Folkways label the following year. Hooker plays with the British band the Groundhogs. The album was re-released with the title Hooker and the Hogs and with overdubbed horns as On the Waterfront.

== Reception ==
Professional ratings
Review scores
| Source | Rating |
|---|---|
| AllMusic | 4.5/5 stars |
| The Encyclopedia of Popular Music | 3/5 stars |

AllMusic's reviewer, Bruce Eder, wrote, "The sound is raw, tight, and raunchy, some of the best band-backed recordings of Hooker's career. He's notoriously difficult to play support for because of the spontaneity of his work, but these guys keep up and then some, adding engaging flourishes and grace notes. Hooker is in excellent voice, and his material is as strong as any album in his output, rough, dark, and moody."

The editors of Billboard listed the album in the "Blues Special Merit" category, and a reviewer stated: "Hooker is one of the greatest blues singers extant, and the sound of the delta and swamp are in his sides. Devotees will want this one."

Fraser Lewry of Classic Rock called the album "a rough and ready collection," with the Groundhogs "handling Hooker's spontaneity with relaxed aplomb."

== Track listing ==
All compositions credited to John Lee Hooker

1. "Bad Luck and Trouble" – 4:05
2. "Waterfront" – 4:20
3. "No One Pleases Me But You" – 2:20
4. "It's Raining Here" – 3:55
5. "It's a Crazy Mixed Up World" – 4:10
6. "Seven Days And Seven Nights" – 3:55
7. "Mai Lee" – 3:36
8. "I'm Losin' You" – 3:50
9. "Little Girl Go Back to School" – 3:55
10. "Little Dreamer" – 4:10
11. "Don't Be Messin' with My Bread" – 3:24

== Personnel ==
- John Lee Hooker – guitar, vocals
- Tom Parker – piano, organ
- Tony McPhee – guitar
- Pete Cruickshank – electric bass
- Dave Boorman – drums
