= Andrew Lauder (music executive) =

British music industry executive (1947–2025)

- Born: Andrew Justus Lauder; 22 May 1947; Hartlepool, County Durham, England
- Died: 26 November 2025 (aged 78) Seillans, France
- Genres: Pop, hard rock krautrock
- Occupations: A&R executive Record executive Record producer
- Years active: 1967–2025
- Labels: Liberty Records, United Artists Records, Radar Records, F-Beat Records, Demon Music Group, Silvertone Records

Andrew Justus Lauder (22 May 1947 – 26 November 2025) was a British record company executive and A&R manager. He was noted for his adventurous signings of bands as diverse as Bonzo Dog Doo-Dah Band, Can, Hawkwind and Brinsley Schwarz to Liberty Records and United Artists Records in the 1960s and 1970s. He later formed numerous independent labels including Radar Records, F-Beat Records, Demon Music Group and Silvertone Records.

== Early life ==
Lauder was born in Hartlepool, County Durham, England on 22 May 1947, the son of a timber yard owner. He attended Wellingborough School in Northamptonshire. He moved to London around 1965 to look for work and joined Southern Music as an accounts clerk.

== Liberty and United Artists Records ==
In 1967, a friend introduced Lauder to Bob Reisdorf, who was launching Liberty Records in the UK. Lauder was initially "label manager" and oversaw the reissuing of back catalogues including Eddie Cochran and Fats Domino, before making himself Liberty's Artists and Repertoire (A&R) manager and quickly signing The Idle Race, Family and the Bonzo Dog Doo-Dah Band. Also, in 1968 Tony McPhee & The Groundhogs for £50. On the Liberty sampler Gutbucket (1969) Lauder placed The Bonzo's spoof 'Can Blue Men Sing The Whites' directly after Tony McPhee's 'No More Doggin'. In 1971, The Groundhog's 'Split' LP was the best-selling record on the Liberty / UA label. Liberty primarily signed hippie or underground "album bands", and also licensed a number of US acts such as Captain Beefheart. Lauder largely ignored the pop market, although the label had a few UK hit singles such as Creedence Clearwater Revival's "Proud Mary".

In 1968, Liberty was bought by Transamerica Corporation and then absorbed by their existing label United Artists Records, Lauder becoming head of A&R for United Artists in the UK. In 1969, United Artists rebuffed Chrysalis Records’ attempt to poach Lauder, and gave him greater control. During Lauder's tenure at Liberty Records (based in Mortimer Street, London) he organised the Liberty Records Football team made up of various young industry luminaries and occasional guests who played regular friendly matches at Colliers Wood, South London. Among the players were Leapy Lee, Dave Margerrison, Dick Leahy and Daily Mirror editor Richard Stott.

Lauder's personal music preferences were West Coast hippie bands such as Quicksilver Messenger Service and the Grateful Dead, which was reflected in his signing bands like Man and Help Yourself; but Lauder became known for releasing an extremely diverse range of bands; from Krautrock:- Can, Amon Düül II and Neu! via Underground music:- Hawkwind and Motörhead to Pub rock:- Brinsley Schwarz, Dr Feelgood and The Inmates and then Punk rock, signing The Stranglers and Buzzcocks shortly before leaving United Artists.

Lauder commissioned a number of notable artists, including Barney Bubbles, Rick Griffin and Hapshash and the Coloured Coat and used a wide variety of promotional techniques: coloured vinyl, elaborate album covers, limited edition budget albums and charity concerts.

Lauder brought the Flamin' Groovies to Britain even though they had been turned down by United Artists in the US. He would also stick with artists who left bands in his roster, e.g. signing Motorhead, Michael Moorcock and Robert Calvert from Hawkwind, and Deke Leonard, Clive John and The Neutrons when they left Man. His personal interests were reflected in events such as the "United Artists 'Save Hartlepool Football Club' weekend".

== Independent record companies ==
In 1977, Lauder was offered major role at Arista Records, but instead, he co-founded Radar Records with Martin Davis. Radar took on several Stiff Records acts, including Nick Lowe, Elvis Costello and the Attractions and Yachts. Lauder and Jake Riviera opened F-Beat Records in 1979, and several acts, notably Elvis Costello and the Attractions and Nick Lowe, transferred from Radar Records. Lauder and Riviera also started Demon Music Group in 1980, to concentrate on the singles market, early signings including Department S and Bananarama.

Lauder was briefly with Island Records, signing U2 in March 1980 and offering Buzzcocks frontman Pete Shelley a solo record deal. In 1988, he formed the UK based Silvertone Records under the Zomba Group of Companies. Initially focusing on indie bands such as The Stone Roses, he expanded their roster to include Peter "Sonic Boom" Kember John Lee Hooker, J.J. Cale and The Men They Couldn't Hang.

In 1993, Lauder started "This Way Up" label whose signings included Ian McNabb, The Warm Jets, Tindersticks, Redd Kross and Pal Shazar. By 2002, he was living in Knowstone, Devon, where he ran Acadia and Evangeline (not to be confused with the US Evangeline Records label) releasing albums by Ronnie Lane, Spirit, Gov't Mule, Loudon Wainwright III and The Steepwater Band and employed local schoolgirl Joss Stone on work experience. These labels later became part of Floating World Records.

Happy Trails: Andrew Lauder's Charmed Life and High Times in the Record Business (ISBN 147462359X), a memoir co-written by Lauder and Mick Houghton, was released in 2023.

== Death ==
Lauder died in Seillans, France on 26 November 2025, at the age of 78.

== Bibliography ==
- Lauder, Andrew (2023). Happy trails : Andrew Lauder's charmed life and high times in the record business. London: White Rabbit. ISBN 9781474623599.
