= Dave Kelly (musician) =

British blues singer, guitarist, and composer (born 1947)

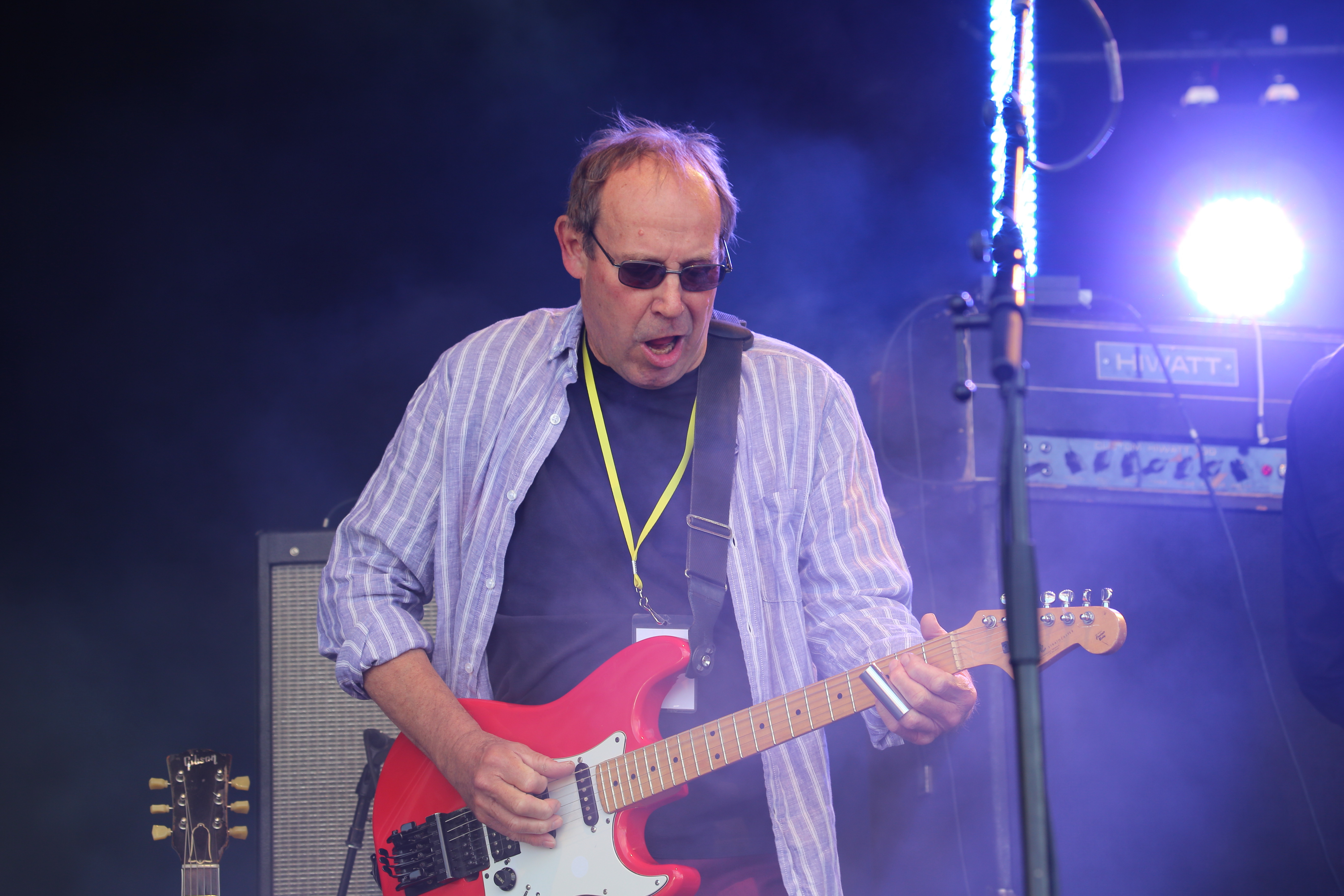
- Kelly with the Blues Band in 2013

Background information
- Birth name: David William Kelly
- Born: 13 March 1947 (age 78)
- Genres: British blues
- Occupations: Singer; guitarist; composer

David William Kelly (born 13 March 1947) is a British blues singer, guitarist and composer, who has been active on the British blues music scene since the 1960s. He has performed with the John Dummer Blues Band, Tramp, the Blues Band, and his own Dave Kelly Band. He is a disciple of Mississippi Fred McDowell.

== Family ==
His sister Jo Ann Kelly was also a blues singer, and she and Dave participated in many musical projects together.

== Discography ==
Albums

- Blues Leftovers (various artists) (1969 – Immediate)
- Keeps It in the Family (1969 – Mercury)
- Dave Kelly (1971 – Mercury)
- Survivors (1979 – Appaloosa)
- Willing (1979 – Appaloosa)
- Feels Right (1981 – Cool King)
- Dave Kelly Band: Live (1983 – Appaloosa)
- Dave Kelly Band: Mind in a Glass (1985 Metronome)
- Dave Kelly Band: Heart of the City (1987 – Thunderbolt UK/Line Germany)
- Standing at the Crossroads (1988 – Inakustik / Inak Records)
- When the Blues Come To Call (1994 – Hypertension Music)
- Resting My Bones (2004 – Hypertension Music)
- We Had It All (2013 – Hypertension Music)

== Bibliography ==
- Bane, M., (1982) White boy singin' the blues, London: Penguin, 1982, ISBN 0-14-006045-6.
- Bob Brunning, Blues: The British Connection, Helter Skelter Publishing, London 2002, ISBN 1-900924-41-2 – First edition 1986 – Second edition 1995 Blues in Britain
- Bob Brunning, The Fleetwood Mac Story: Rumours and Lies, Omnibus Press London, 1990 and 1998, ISBN 0-7119-6907-8
- Martin Celmins, Peter Green – Founder of Fleetwood Mac, Sanctuary London, 1995, foreword by B. B. King, ISBN 1-86074-233-5
- Fancourt, L., (1989) British blues on record (1957–1970), Retrack Books.
- Dick Heckstall-Smith, The safest place in the world: A personal history of British Rhythm and blues, 1989 Quartet Books Limited, ISBN 0-7043-2696-5 – Second Edition : Blowing The Blues – Fifty Years Playing The British Blues, 2004, Clear Books, ISBN 1-904555-04-7
- Christopher Hjort, Strange brew: Eric Clapton and the British blues boom, 1965-1970, foreword by John Mayall, Jawbone 2007, ISBN 1-906002-00-2
- Paul Myers, Long John Baldry and the Birth of the British Blues, Vancouver 2007, GreyStone Books, ISBN 1-55365-200-2
- Harry Shapiro, Alexis Korner: The Biography, Bloomsbury Publishing PLC, London 1997, Discography by Mark Troster, ISBN 0-7475-3163-3
- Schwartz, R. F., (2007) How Britain got the blues : The transmission and reception of American blues style in the United Kingdom Ashgate, ISBN 0-7546-5580-6.
- Mike Vernon, The Blue Horizon story 1965-1970 vol.1, notes of the booklet of the Box Set (60 pages)
- Paul Freestone, 'Eccentric Man: A Biography & Discography of Tony (TS) McPhee'. Incompetent Publishing. ISBN 978-0-9568652-0-5
