= Time Is =

Studio album by The Idle Race
- Released: May 1971
- Recorded: 1970
- Genre: Rock, folk
- Label: Regal Zonophone
- Producer: The Idle Race & Kenneth Young

The Idle Race chronology
Idle Race (1969)	Time Is (1971)	Back to the Story (1996)

Professional ratings
Review scores
Source	Rating
Allmusic	link

Time Is is the third and final studio album recorded by The Idle Race. It was recorded in 1970 after Jeff Lynne had left the band. He was replaced by vocalist Dave Walker and guitarist Mike Hopkins.

== Track listing ==
1. "Dancing Flower" (Dave Pritchard) – 2:14
2. "Sad O'Sad" (Pritchard) – 3:28
3. "The Clock" (Pritchard) – 3:22
4. "I Will See You" (Dave Walker) – 3:11
5. "By the Sun" (Roger Spencer) – 6:42
6. "Alcatraz" (Pritchard, Spencer, Walker) – 4:02
7. "And the Rain" (Walker, Pritchard) – 2:52
8. "She Sang Hymns Out of Tune" (Jesse Lee Kincaid) – 3:07
9. "Bitter Green" (Gordon Lightfoot) – 3:45
10. "We Want It All" (Walker, Spencer) – 4:10

== Personnel ==
The Idle Race

- Dave Pritchard - vocals, rhythm guitar, flute
- Dave Walker - vocals, harmonica, piano
- Mike Hopkins - lead guitar, acoustic guitar, vocals
- Greg Masters - bass guitar, vocals, electric cello
- Roger Spencer - drums, percussion, vocals

Technical

- Management - Don Arden
- Producer - Idle Race, Kenneth Young
- Assistant producer - David Arden
- Design, art direction - Joe McGillicuddy
- Photography - Tim Fulford-Brown
