= Tramp (band) =

British blues band

Tramp were a British blues band, active during the late 1960s and early 1970s on an intermittent basis. This on/off activity and the loose, transient nature of the band's line-up were reflected in the group's name.

The line-up centred on the brother–sister pairing of Dave Kelly and Jo Ann Kelly, and included various members of Fleetwood Mac, plus various session musicians. The band released two albums, Tramp in 1969, and Put A Record On in 1974. All members participated in many other projects before, after and even during their time with Tramp.

== Members ==
- Dave Kelly – vocals, guitar
- Jo Ann Kelly – vocals
- Bob Brunning – bass guitar
- Mick Fleetwood – drums
- Danny Kirwan – guitar
- Bob Hall – piano
- Dave Brooks – saxophone
- Ian Morton – percussion
