= Mike McKenna (musician) =

Musical artist (born 1946)

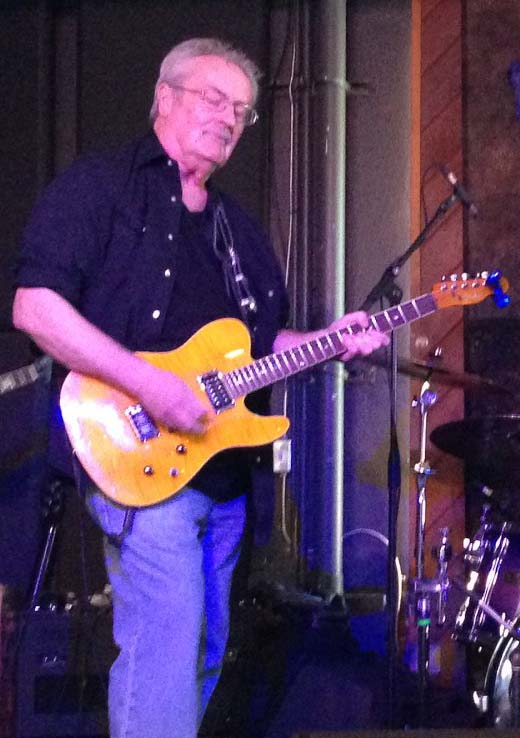
- Mike McKenna performs at The Boathouse in Kitchener, Ontario on April 29th, 2018

Background information
- Born: April 15, 1946 (age 80); Toronto, Ontario, Canada
- Genres: Rock, blues
- Instrument: Guitar
- Years active: 1960's – present
- Member of: Luke & The Apostles; Mike McKenna's Slidewinder Blues Band
- Formerly of: McKenna Mendelson Mainline; The Ugly Ducklings; Diamondback; Downchild Blues Band; The Guess Who
- Website: http://mikemckenna.ca

Mike McKenna (born April 15, 1946) is a professional Canadian rock / blues guitarist noted primarily for his electric slide playing.

== History ==
Born in Toronto, Ontario, Canada, McKenna began playing professionally in the early 1960s in Yorkville where he formed the group Mike's Trio. Luke Gibson saw them and asked to sit in as a singer and Luke and The Apostles were later formed. McKenna got a particularly rich guitar sound by playing through 200 watt Marshall Plexi stacks and using banjo strings on the high end to make note bending easier (a trick he supposedly learned from Robbie Robertson - then playing with The Hawks and backing Ronnie Hawkins).

Luke and the Apostles were asked to open for Jefferson Airplane and The Grateful Dead by Bill Graham (of Fillmore East / Fillmore West fame) for a week-long stint at Toronto's O'Keefe Centre in 1967. Graham realized that a strong local band was necessary to attract a Toronto audience since at that time, the San Francisco sound was relatively unknown outside of the US. Jerry Garcia apparently liked the sound of McKenna's Les Paul so much he bought it (reportedly it's the black Les Paul Garcia once posed with when he was being photographed for Rolling Stone magazine). An invitation to visit New York to open with the Dead followed and the Apostles recorded a single for Elektra Records (produced by The Doors' Paul Rothchild). Unfortunately inconclusive contract negotiations and conflicting priorities, (including Rothchilds' bust on a possession charge) saw the band returning to Canada and eventually disbanding.

Returning to Toronto, McKenna briefly joined The Ugly Ducklings. In July 2011, Pacemaker Recordsreleased "Thump & Twang", a demo of the group from early 1968 featuring McKenna on lead guitar.

Interested in forming a new blues band, McKenna took out a newspaper ad seeking musicians which put him in touch with Joe Mendelson. This ultimately led to the formation of the McKenna Mendelson Mainline (later known simply as Mainline), and the recording of the album McKenna Mendelson Blues - a demo recorded in Canada but unreleased until after the band had gone to England (at John Lee Hooker's suggestion) and had great success with the landmark (and seminal McKenna Mendelson Mainline) album Stink (recorded in 1969 in the UK). "Stink" garnered considerable success in England and throughout Europe and the band returned to Canada to critical and popular acclaim. However, personality clashes and musical differences led to MMM disbanding in the early 1970s . There were a couple of posthumous reunions as "Mainline", including two very successful tours of Australia, and the notorious "Bump and Grind Review" which yielded a live album "The Mainline Bump and Grind Review Live at the Victory" (recorded at Toronto's famous Victory Burlesque Theatre) in 1972. A final album with Joe Mendelson entitled "No Substitute" was released in 1975 to a poor reception, after which McKenna and Mendelson never played together again.

McKenna has been with a number of notable groups throughout the years since Mainline called it quits, including tenure with Downchild Blues Band, Diamondback, and The Guess Who (in an early 1980s post-Burton Cummings lineup). After a hiatus of some years, he formed Slidewinder with saxophonist Ronnie Jacobs (a Mainline alumnus and a founding member of the Downchild Blues Band) in the early - mid 1990s and released a self-titled CD "Mike McKenna and Slidewinder" in 1997, with Denny Gerrard on bass, Rob McPhearson on keyboards, and Bruce Brooker on drums.

When Toronto's internationally known El Mocambo Tavern closed down in November 2001, the alumni Mainline members (but without Joe Mendelson) were invited to perform and McKenna along with Tony Nolasco (drums, vocals), Ted Purdy (acoustic guitar, vocals), Mike Harrison (bass), and Bob Adams (harp) entered Toronto's rock history as the last band to grace the El Mo's famous upstairs stage.

In later years, McKenna reformed with Luke Gibson (of Luke and the Apostles) as lead guitarist for The Luke Gibson Band - the house band for the ill-fated Blues on Belair Club in Toronto in the late 1990s. He also played briefly with the original Mainline members (sans Mendelson) at the same venue.

McKenna was rehearsing and recording with the original members of Diamondback in late 2007/early 2008. The Diamondback album originally recorded in 1974 (but never released) came out as CD on Pacemaker in the fall of 2008

On April 25, 2009, McKenna celebrated both his birthday and his 45 years on the Toronto music scene by hosting an all-day event at the Black Swan Tavern in Toronto. The event featured a who's who of Toronto's rock and roll / blues / Yorkville Sound scene including the original members of Mainlne - Tony Nolasco, Mike Harrison, Ted Purdy (who replaced Mendelson) and Bob Adams (sitting in on harmonica); Luke Gibson (of Luke and the Apostles); Dave Bingham (of the Ugly Ducklings); Kensington Market; various members of DiamondBack; and Scott "Professor Piano" Cushnie, among others.

In the fall of 2009, McKenna began rehearsing once again with Luke Gibson (of Luke & the Apostles). David Martin / drums, percussion; William (Bill) Miller / bass; and Michael Keys / keyboards, McKenna (on lead guitar, slide guitar, vocals) and Gibson (doing the honours on lead vocals and guitar) showcased the now defunct McKenna Gibson Band at the Black Swan Tavern in Toronto on December 12, 2009.

McKenna continued playing and performing occasionally with Gibson (as Luke and the Apostles) but with different lineups that sometimes included original member Peter Jermyn on keyboards and playing predominantly old late 1960s/early 1970s Mainline and Apostles' material to predominantly a "nostalgia" crowd. In 2017, the self-titled album Luke & The Apostles was released on True North Records, the band's first full-length release.

As of 2019, McKenna was playing regularly in and around Toronto with three bands: Luke and the Apostles, a new version of Slidewinder focused on Mainline and other blues-rock material, and Mike McKenna's Rockin' Redcoats (which includes former Blue Rodeo, The Viletones, and Battered Wives drummer Cleave Anderson), playing rockabilly, surf-rock, country and blues.

In 2023, McKenna was nominated for the Maple Blues Awards "Blues With a Feeling" Lifetime Achievement honor.

In 2026, McKenna self-published a memoir "Goin' To Toronto" with FriesenPress.

== Discography ==
=== Singles ===
with LUKE & THE APOSTLES

- 1967 Been Burnt c/w Don't Know Why (Bounty 45105)
- 1967 Been Burnt c/w Don't Know Why (Elektra 45105)
- 1970 You Make Me High c/w Not Far Off (TN 101)
- 1970 You Make Me High c/w You Make Me High (TN 102)

as MCKENNA MENDELSON MAINLINE
Better Watch Out/ She's Alright (Liberty/United Artists - UK)

- 1969 Don't Give Me No Goose For Christmas/Beltmaker (Liberty/United Artists - UK)

as MAINLINE

- 1971 Get Down To/Pedalictus Rag (GRT)

=== Albums ===
as MCKENNA MENDELSON MAINLINE

- 1969 Stink (Liberty/United Artists)
- 1969 McKenna Mendelson Mainline Blues (Paragon/Allied, CD reissue Pacemaker)
- 1994 Stink (Capitol-EMI / re-issue)
- 1996 McKenna Mendelson Mainline Blues [CD re-issue] (Pacemaker)

as MAINLINE

- 1971 Canada Our Home & Native Land (GRT)
- 1972 The Mainline Bump 'n' Grind Revue
- 1973 No Substitute
- 2002 Last Show @ The Elmo (Bullseye)

as MIKE McKENNA

- 1996 Mike McKenna and Slidewinder (Pacemaker)
- 2007 Live Bootleg (Indie)

with LUKE & THE APOSTLES

- 2017 Luke & The Apostles (True North)

with DIAMONDBACK

- 2008 Original cd (recorded 1974) (Pacemaker Entertainment)

with DOWNCHILD BLUES BAND

- 1987 It's Been So Long (Stony Plain)

with VARIOUS ARTISTS (COMPILATIONS)

- 1998 North Of Watford Volume 3: 24 RARE POP & SOUL CLASSICS 1966 - 1992 (KRL) - track - "She's Alright"
- 197-? Steps ... From Anywhere (LIBERTY) - track - "Better Watch Out"
