= Mendelson Joe =

Canadian artist (1944–2023)

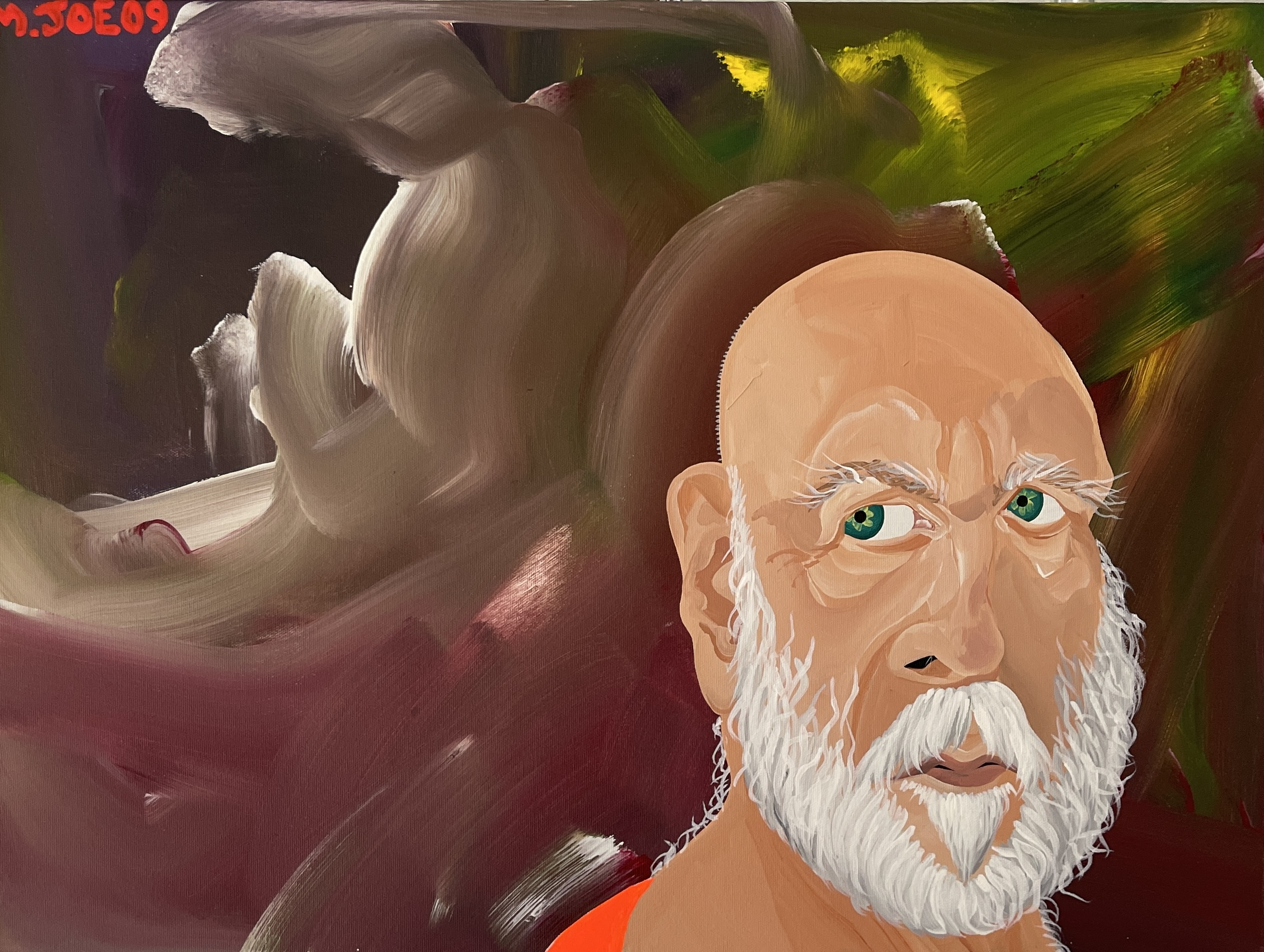
- Self-portrait, "Live At Sixty-Five"
- Born: Birrell Josef Mendelson; July 30, 1944; Maple, Ontario, Canada
- Died: February 7, 2023 (aged 78); Emsdale, Ontario, Canada
- Education: BA University of Toronto
- Known for: Singer-songwriter, guitarist, painter, political and social activist
- Spouse: Karen Robinson
- Website: mendelsonjoe.ca

Birrell Josef Mendelson (July 30, 1944 – February 7, 2023), known as Mendelson Joe, was a Canadian singer-songwriter, guitarist, painter, and political activist, who was known for his art's political themes. Born and raised in Toronto, Ontario, and then moving to Maple, Ontario, at age 13. He attended University of Toronto, graduating with a B.A. in arts, 1966.

Joe was the nephew of Ruth Eisenberg, "Ivory" of Ebony and Ivory. He died through medical assistance in dying on February 7, 2023, at the age of 78.

== Music career ==
He began performing as a blues musician under the name Joe Mendelson in 1964. Four years later, he joined with guitarist Mike McKenna to form the band McKenna Mendelson Mainline. Despite achieving some success, he was dissatisfied with being in the group, and left in 1972 to pursue a solo career. The group reformed briefly in 1975.

In 1975, after releasing two albums as "Joe Mendelson", he adopted his current name, "Mendelson Joe". On his earlier albums, he worked closely with other artists as co-producers, including former McKenna Mendelson Mainline bandmate Edward "Ted" William Purdy and Colin Linden. His later works were mostly self-produced. Likewise, his early albums mostly appeared on a series of independent labels (including Taurus Records, Boot Records, and Anthem Records), but his later self-produced albums were released independently. In total, Joe recorded more than 30 solo albums, although only about half were officially released.

In 1988, he appeared in an episode of Sharon, Lois & Bram's Elephant Show titled "Sunday in the Park". Around this period, a music video for a novelty song he recorded, "Dance with Joe", received extensive airplay on MuchMusic.

== Painting career ==
First putting brush to canvas in 1975, Joe would also make a name for himself as a contemporary artist, pursuing painting, often portraits of famous Canadians. In 1980, he had a show of his work at the Canadian Cultural Centre, Paris in which his art style was described as "Dauntless Evidentiam". In 1985, he had a show of 25 portraits at the Robert McLaughlin Gallery in Oshawa titled "Working Women", curated by Joan Murray. His most famous painting depicted Prime Minister Brian Mulroney with his face superimposed on a pair of human buttocks. He published a book of his portraits, Joe's Toronto, in 2005.

Joe appeared in Derek May's 1981 documentary film on the Toronto art scene, Off the Wall.

== Discography ==
=== McKenna Mendelson Mainline ===
- McKenna Mendelson Blues (Paragon, 1969) 'bootlegged demo tape'
- Stink (Liberty Records, 1969)
- Canada - Our Home and Native Land (GRT Records, 1971)
- The Bump 'n' Grind Review (GRT Records, 1972)
- Mainline: No Substitute - The Grand Reunion of Mainline (Taurus Records, 1975)

=== Solo ===
- Mr. Middle Of The Road (Nobody Records, distributed by GRT Records, 1972) 'as Joe Mendelson'
- Sophisto (Taurus Records, 1975) 'as Joe Mendelson'
- Not Homogenized (Boot Records, 1979)
- Jack Frost (Boot Records, 1980)
- Let's Party (Boot Records, 1981)
- Not Safe (1982) *
- The Name of The Game Ain't Schmaltz: Some of the Best of Mendelson Joe (Stony Plain Records, 1984)
- Fragile Man (Health Records, 1986) *
- Born To Cuddle (Anthem Records, 1988) 'recorded with the Shuffle Demons'
- Addicted (Anthem Records, 1991)
- Women Are the Only Hope (1992) *
- Humans Bug Me (1997) *
- Spoiled Bratland (1998) *
- Everybody Needs a Pimp (1999) *
- Humans (Old Bold Records, 1999) *
- Live At Sixty-Five (Old Bold Records, 2010) *
- Buried Treasure (2014) *

* Independently released
