= Thank Christ for the Bomb =

Studio album by The Groundhogs
- Released: May 1970
- Recorded: February 1970
- Genre: Blues rock; progressive rock; psychedelic
- Length: 39.41
- Label: Liberty Records (original release); BGO (1989 UK reissue); Akarma (1998 Italian reissue); Elemental Music (2014 reissue); Fire (2018 UK reissue)
- Producer: Tony (T.S.) McPhee

The Groundhogs chronology
Blues Obituary (1969)	Thank Christ for the Bomb (1970)	Split (1971)

Professional ratings
Review scores
Source	Rating
Allmusic	4.5/5 stars

Thank Christ for the Bomb is the third studio album recorded by The Groundhogs, originally released by Liberty Records in 1970. It was engineered by Martin Birch, who had previously worked on albums by Deep Purple, Jeff Beck, Fleetwood Mac and Peter Green. It entered the UK Melody Maker album charts at number 27 on 20 June 1970, and had a total of 3 entries in that chart.

The album is a concept album, or to be exact, has two concepts. Side 1 (tracks 1–4) addresses what McPhee termed "alienness" while side 2 is, according to the sleeve notes, "the story of a man who lived in Chelsea all his life; first in a mansion then on the benches of the embankment".

== Artwork ==
The image of Pete Cruickshank on the left of the cover is adapted from photograph Q 1 in the Imperial War Museum's photograph archive.

== Track listing ==
All tracks composed by Tony McPhee

1. "Strange Town" – 4:16
2. "Darkness Is No Friend" – 3:48
3. "Soldier" – 4:51
4. "Thank Christ for the Bomb" – 7:15
5. "Ship on the Ocean" – 3:27
6. "Garden" – 5:19
7. "Status People" – 3:32
8. "Rich Man, Poor Man" – 3:25
9. "Eccentric Man" – 4:53

2003 CD reissue bonus tracks (live versions)

1. "Garden" – 3:35
2. "Eccentric Man" – 5:01
3. "Soldier" – 15:03

== Personnel ==
The Groundhogs

- Tony McPhee – guitars, vocals
- Peter Cruickshank – bass
- Ken Pustelnik – drums

Technical

- Martin Birch – engineer
- Alan Tanner – artwork
