= Split (Groundhogs album) =

Studio album by Groundhogs
- Released: March 1971
- Recorded: November 1970
- Studio: De Lane Lea Studios, London
- Genre: Blues rock; progressive rock
- Length: 39:52
- Label: Liberty (original UK release); United Artists (original US release); BGO (1989 & 1997 UK reissues); Akarma (2003 Italian reissue); Fire (2020 UK reissue)
- Producer: Tony (T.S.) McPhee

Groundhogs chronology
Thank Christ for the Bomb (1970)	Split (1971)	Who Will Save the World? The Mighty Groundhogs (1972)

Split is a studio album recorded by English blues and rock band Groundhogs in November 1970 and released in March 1971.

It was originally released by Liberty Records with catalogue number LBG 83401. It was reissued on CD reissue in 2003 by Liberty / EMI Records, with catalogue number 07243-584819-2-1. In September 2020, it was released on limited-edition red vinyl (as well as CD) from Fire Records, including a second disc containing a number of outtakes and new sleeve notes by Dave Henderson of Mojo magazine.

According to Tony McPhee's sleeve notes for the 2003 CD reissue, the lyrics for Split were inspired by a panic attack he experienced in May 1970, and the studio version of "Cherry Red" was recorded live in a single take.

== Track listing ==
All tracks composed by Tony McPhee

1. "Split - Part One" – 4:25
2. "Split - Part Two" – 5:10
3. "Split - Part Three" – 4:25
4. "Split - Part Four" – 5:38
5. "Cherry Red" – 5:40
6. "A Year in the Life" – 3:07
7. "Junkman" – 4:52
8. "Groundhog" – 5:35

"Groundhog" is based on "Ground Hog Blues" by John Lee Hooker.

=== Bonus tracks on 2003 CD reissue ===
(recorded live in 1972 for a BBC In Concert programme)

1. "Split - Part One" – 9:42
2. "Split - Part Two" – 6:13
3. "Split - Part Four" – 4:27
4. "Cherry Red" – 4:06

=== Bonus tracks on 2020 red vinyl reissue ===
(Fire Records, FIRELP508)

1. "Split - Part One (instrumental)" – 5:14
2. "Split - Part Two (take three)" – 5:18
3. "Split - Part Three (unlisted take with overdubbed guitar)" – 6:52
4. "Cherry Red (take six)" – 6:07
5. "A Year in the Life (instrumental)" – 3:13
6. "Split - Part Three (no intro)" – 4:02
7. "Split - Part Four (instrumental)" – 6:54

== Personnel ==
Groundhogs

- Tony McPhee – guitars, vocals
- Peter Cruikshank – bass guitar
- Ken Pustelnik – drums

Technical

- Martin Birch – engineer
- Chris Richardson – sleeve design, photography

== Split Up - An Exhumation by Andrew Liles ==
In 2015, Andrew Liles and Tony McPhee remixed the album, in a "reconstruction, reordering and rearrangement", using modern effects. McPhee said Liles had "done what I would have if I'd had the modern pedals. Andrew has done me a great service by bringing my recordings into the 21st Century."
