= Santa Barbara Machine Head =

British electric blues combo

- Genres: Electric blues
- Years active: 1966
- Label: Immediate Records
- Past members: John "Twink" Alder; Kim Gardner; Jon Lord; Ronnie Wood

Santa Barbara Machine Head were a short-lived British electric blues combo that formed and disbanded in late 1966. At the time they formed, Jon Lord was the organist of The Artwoods, Ronnie Wood and Kim Gardner were members of The Birds, and John "Twink" Alder was the drummer for The In Crowd (soon to change their name to Tomorrow). They recorded three instrumental songs together for Immediate Records; "Albert", "Porcupine Juice" and "Rubber Monkey", written by Jon Lord and session producer Gus Dudgeon, released in 1968 on the compilation album Blues Anytime Vol. 3. All four members later went on to achieve success and notoriety with other bands.

== Members ==
- John "Twink" Alder - drums
- Kim Gardner - bass
- Jon Lord - keyboards
- Ronnie Wood - guitar
