= It Serve You Right to Suffer =

Studio album by John Lee Hooker
- Released: 1966
- Recorded: New York City
- Genre: Blues
- Length: 33:10
- Label: Impulse!
- Producer: Bob Thiele

John Lee Hooker chronology
...And Seven Nights (1965)	It Serve You Right to Suffer (1966)	The Real Folk Blues (1966)

Professional ratings
Review scores
Source	Rating
AllMusic	3/5 stars
DownBeat	4/5 stars
The Encyclopedia of Popular Music	3/5 stars
The Penguin Guide to Blues Recordings	2.5/4 stars
Pitchfork	8.6/10

It Serve You Right to Suffer (later retitled It Serves You Right To Suffer on some reissues) is an album by blues singer, songwriter, and guitarist John Lee Hooker, released on the Impulse Records label in early 1966 (catalogue no. 9103). It was part of the short-lived Impulse folk music division, with the slogan adapted from their jazz promotion, "the new wave of folk is on Impulse!"

Signed to Impulse's parent label ABC Records, it is the only album Hooker made for the jazz label. Producer Bob Thiele partnered Hooker with session musicians all possessing jazz pedigree, presenting a unique setting for his music. The released songs are a mix of new compositions and re-working of ones Hooker had previously recorded, and includes a cover of the Barrett Strong 1959 Motown hit "Money (That's What I Want)."

The album was reissued for compact disc by MCA Records on July 27, 1999.

== Track listing ==
All songs by John Lee Hooker except "Money" by Berry Gordy and Janie Bradford.

=== Side one ===
1. "Shake It Baby" – 4:23
2. "Country Boy" – 5:42
3. "Bottle Up & Go" – 2:27
4. "You're Wrong" – 4:22

=== Side two ===
1. "Sugar Mama" – 3:15
2. "Decoration Day" – 5:11
3. "Money" – 2:26
4. "It Serves You Right to Suffer" – 5:15

== Personnel ==
- John Lee Hooker - vocals, guitar
- Barry Galbraith - guitar
- Milt Hinton - bass guitar
- Panama Francis - drums
- William Wells - trombone on "Money"
