= Concert at Newport =

Live album by John Lee Hooker
- Released: 1964
- Recorded: July 27, 1963
- Venue: Newport Folk Festival, Newport, Rhode Island
- Genre: Blues
- Label: Vee-Jay

John Lee Hooker chronology
Live at Sugar Hill (1963)	Concert at Newport (1964)	...And Seven Nights (1965)

Concert at Newport is a live album by the blues musician John Lee Hooker, recorded at the Newport Folk Festival and released by the Vee-Jay label in 1963.

== Reception ==
Professional ratings
Review scores
Source	Rating
AllMusic	4.5/5 stars
The Penguin Guide to Blues Recordings	1.5/4 stars
(The New) Rolling Stone Album Guide	4/5 stars
The Virgin Encyclopedia of The Blues	4/5 stars

AllMusic reviewer Ron Wynn stated: "Arguably his finest live date, this was John Lee Hooker minus the self-congratulatory mugging now an almost mandatory part of his sets. Instead, there's just lean, straight, defiant Hooker vocals and minimal, but effective backing".

== Track listing ==
All compositions credited to John Lee Hooker

1. "I Can't Quit You Now Blues" – 2:51
2. "Stop Baby Don't Hold Me That Way" – 1:44
3. "Tupelo" – 5:17
4. "Bus Station Blues" – 3:38
5. "Freight Train Be My Friend" – 3:25
6. "Boom Boom Boom" – 2:29
7. "Talk That Talk Baby" – 1:26
8. "Sometimes Baby, You Make Me Feel So Bad" – 3:27
9. "You've Got to Walk Yourself" – 4:52
10. "Let's Make It" – 2:23
11. "The Mighty Fire" – 4:42

== Personnel ==
- John Lee Hooker – guitar, vocals
- Unidentified musician – bass (tracks 9–11)
