= Idle Race (album) =

Studio album by the Idle Race
- Released: September 1969
- Recorded: 1969
- Studio: Trident Studios, London
- Genre: Psychedelic pop
- Label: Liberty Sleeve photography and design by Michael Hasted
- Producer: Jeff Lynne

The Idle Race chronology
The Birthday Party (1968)	Idle Race (1969)	Time Is (1971)

Professional ratings
Review scores
Source	Rating
Allmusic	link

Idle Race is the second album by the Idle Race, the follow-up to the band's debut, The Birthday Party.

Released in 1969, this record was the first to be produced by Jeff Lynne. After this album failed to chart, Lynne accepted Roy Wood's invitation to join fellow Birmingham band the Move.

== Track listing ==
All tracks composed by Jeff Lynne; except where indicated.

Side 1

1. "Come with Me" - 2:45 (rechanneled to simulate stereo)
2. "Sea of Dreams" - 3:13
3. "Going Home" - 3:44
4. "Reminds Me of You" (Dave Pritchard) - 2:54
5. "Mr. Crow and Sir Norman" - 3:17
6. "Please No More Sad Songs" - 3:20

Side 2

1. "Girl at the Window" - 3:44
2. "Big Chief Woolly Bosher" - 5:15
3. "Someone Knocking" (Dave Pritchard) - 2:56
4. "A Better Life (The Weatherman Knows)" - 2:45
5. "Hurry Up John" - 3:33

== Personnel ==
Idle Race

- Jeff Lynne - vocals, guitar, piano
- Dave Pritchard - guitar, vocals
- Greg Masters - bass guitar, vocals
- Roger Spencer - drums, vocals
