= Hogwash (album) =

Studio album by The Groundhogs
- Released: October 1972
- Recorded: September – October 1972
- Studios: Advision Studios, London
- Genres: Progressive rock; psychedelic; space rock; blues
- Length: 39:04
- Labels: United Artists, BGO
- Producer: Tony McPhee

The Groundhogs chronology
Who Will Save the World? The Mighty Groundhogs (1972)	Hogwash (1972)	Solid (1974)

Hogwash is an album recorded by The Groundhogs, originally released by United Artists Records in 1972, catalogue number UAG 29419. The most recent CD reissue is that of 2008 by BGO Records, catalogue number BGOCD787.

== Music ==
The sound of Hogwash has been classified as progressive rock, and it draws from elements of psychedelic music, space rock and blues.

Tony McPhee was one of the earliest rock guitarists to experiment with guitar-controlled synthesis and Oberheim/Maestro ring modulators. On this album he used a Hagström guitar synthesizer, a simple controller for an ARP 2600 to create unusual guitar sounds.

The album closes with a tribute to John Lee Hooker.

== Track listing ==
All tracks composed by Tony McPhee

1. "I Love Miss Ogyny" – 5:20
2. "You Had a Lesson" – 5:45
3. "The Ringmaster" – 1:25
4. "3744 James Road" – 7:15
5. "Sad is the Hunter" – 5:15
6. "S'One Song" – 3:40
7. "Earth Shanty" – 6:50
8. "Mr Hooker, Sir John" – 3:34

== Personnel ==
- Tony McPhee – guitars, guitar synth, keyboards, vocals
- Peter Cruikshank – bass
- Clive Brooks – drums
- Martin Rushent – engineer
