= The Birthday Party (The Idle Race album) =

Studio album by The Idle Race
- Released: October 1968; Re-Issues 1976, 2014
- Recorded: 1967–68
- Studio: Advision Studios, London
- Genre: Psychedelic pop; pop rock
- Length: 31:36
- Label: Liberty; Sunset (Re-Issue); Parlophone (Re-Issue)
- Producer: Eddy Offord, Gerald Chevin

The Idle Race chronology
The Birthday Party (1968)	Idle Race (1969)

Professional ratings
Review scores
Source	Rating
Allmusic	link

The Birthday Party is the debut album by psychedelic pop band The Idle Race, released in 1968.

This quasi-concept album was the first to be composed almost entirely of songs by a young Birmingham guitarist/singer named Jeff Lynne. The LP came in a gatefold sleeve. The inside sleeve art included a mock birthday feast attended by many British celebrities, including most of the Radio 1 disc jockeys, the Beatles, the Duke of Windsor, actor Warren Mitchell in his role as Alf Garnett, and group leader Jeff Lynne as an eight-year-old schoolboy. In the U.S. the cover art was different with a rather psychedelic-styled paisley pattern behind the band. 18-year-old Liberty Records label-mate Mike Batt contributed string arrangements for "Follow Me, Follow" and "The Lady Who Said She Could Fly", and played accordion on "The Skeleton and the Roundabout" and "Don't Put Your Boys In The Army Mrs Ward".

While warmly received by critics, the record failed to chart in the U.K. or the U.S.

The album was re-issued in 1976 by Liberty on their budget-price label Sunset, although in a non-gatefold sleeve with different design, to capitalise on Lynne's success with Electric Light Orchestra. A further re-issue came in 2014 by Parlophone, as the Liberty back catalogue had long since been acquired by EMI Records, for Record Store Day, in a limited edition on gold vinyl.

== Track listing ==
All tracks composed by Jeff Lynne, except where indicated.

Side 1

1. "Skeleton and the Roundabout" – 2:26
2. "Happy Birthday" (Patty Hill, Mildred J. Hill) – 0:23
3. "The Birthday" – 3:00
4. "I Like My Toys" – 2:12
5. "Morning Sunshine" – 1:48
6. "Follow Me, Follow" – 2:48
7. "Sitting in My Tree" – 1:59 (mono)

Side 2

1. "On With the Show" – 2:22
2. "Lucky Man" – 2:38
3. "(Don't Put Your Boys in the Army) Mrs. Ward" – 2:14
4. "Pie in the Sky" (Dave Pritchard) – 2:23
5. "The Lady Who Said She Could Fly" – 2:22
6. "End of the Road" – 2:09

== Personnel ==
Idle Race

- Jeff Lynne - vocals, guitar, piano
- Dave Pritchard - guitar, vocals
- Greg Masters - bass guitar, vocals
- Roger Spencer - drums, vocals
