= Michael Hasted =

British artist (born 1945)

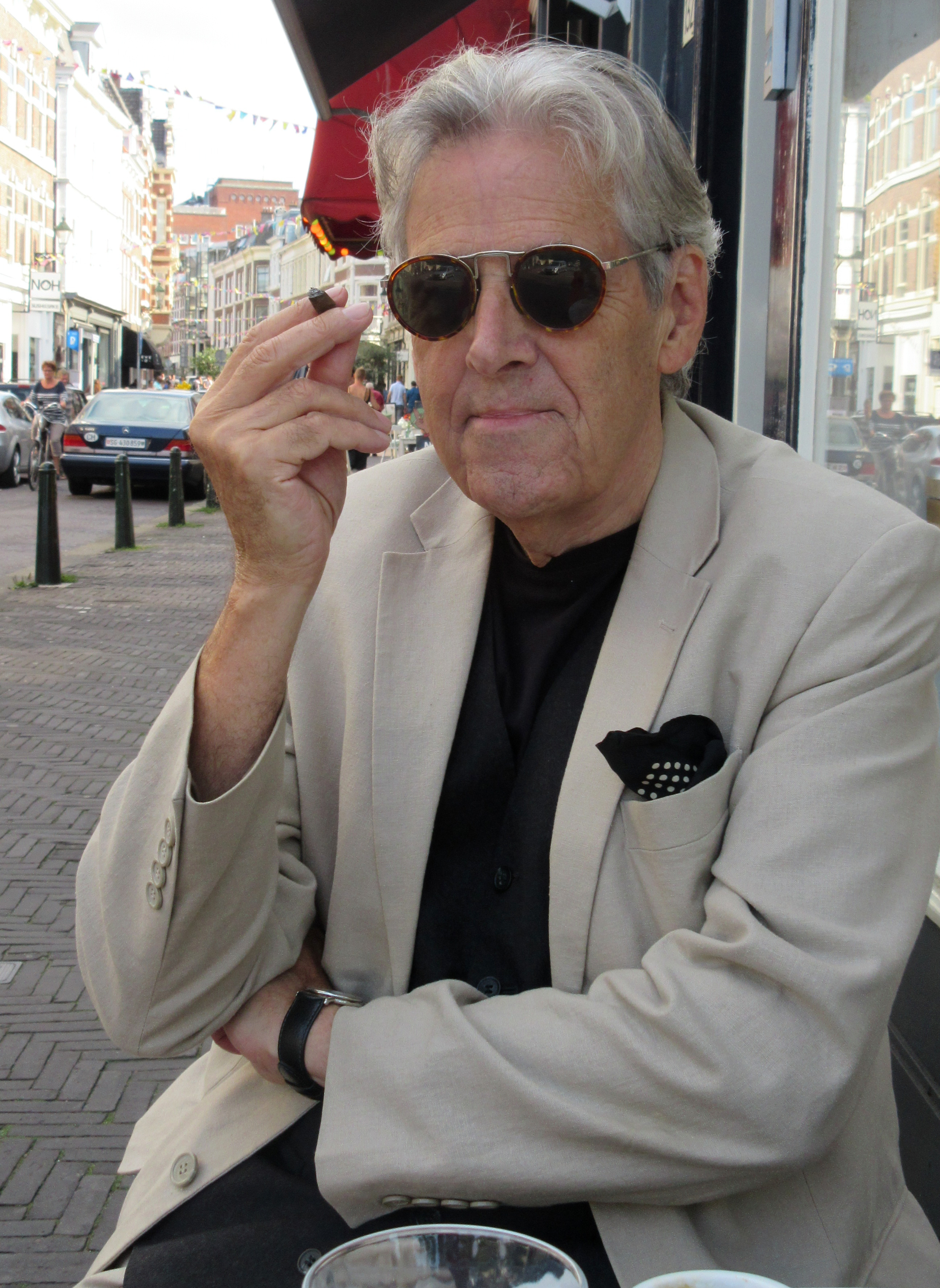
- Born: Bristol, England
- Occupations: Artist, theatre writer, director, and photographer

Michael Hasted (born 1945) is a British artist, writer, director for the theatre, and photographer. He began his career working in repertory theatre and appearing on BBC TV, and later worked in the record industry as a photographer and sleeve designer.

== Early life ==
Michael Hasted was expelled from school at the age of 16 for spending more time backstage at his local repertory theatre, The Everyman in Cheltenham, than on his studies. Unable to accept the place he had been offered at the Bristol Old Vic Theatre School because he was too young to receive a grant, he spent the next few years working in rep all over Great Britain, notably The Everyman, Theatre Royal Lincoln, Queens Theatre, Horncurch and The Dundee Rep. He appeared in various productions with Steven Berkoff, Penelope Keith, James Bolam and John Savident. He was in the controversial You'll Come to Love Your Sperm Test by (and with) John Antrobus at the Traverse Theatre in Edinburgh in 1964. He also appeared in Z CARS on BBC TV.

== Music career ==
He became involved in the music business in the mid 60s and was one of the in-crowd at Les Cousins in London's Soho from 1965-1968 and supplied some of the decor. In April 1966 he hosted a solo gig by Van Morrison there. He also designed their daily event poster and occasionally performed. He collaborated with Cat Stevens on a couple of songs which were not recorded or published, had a demo produced by Al Stewart and was backing singer on a couple of tracks of a Jeff Lynne album.

== Artistic career ==
He continued working in the record industry as a photographer and sleeve designer photographing Hawkwind, Creedence Clearwater Revival, Ravi Shankar, Tiny Tim, Canned Heat, Free, Robert Palmer and did sleeves for The Groundhogs "Scratchin the Surface", Mike Batt Schizophonia and classical guitarist John Williams "The Height Below".

In the early 1970s, he also took up illustration and painting. He produced book jackets and magazine illustrations including for Playboy with whom he worked for 20 years.

His paintings have been exhibited in Europe, Japan and America and are in public collections in England, France, Greece and the United States.

In the mid-1980s, he went to live in France and from 1996 until his return to England in 2003, ran The English Bookshop in Montolieu, the book village in the south of France. He now works as a writer and theatre director, journalist and photographer. In 2011 he wrote a history of the Everyman Theatre in Cheltenham and wrote, produced and directed a revue in the theatre's Studio – 'Final Daze', featuring Robert Whelan, Wendy Abrahams and Steven Rayworth.

In October 2014, he produced and directed John Mortimer's play The Dock Brief at the Everyman starring Tweedy the Clown and Mark Hyde. Also in 2014 He created the on-line theatre magazine StageTalk Magazine.

His book THESPIANS, actors' reminiscences of the 1940s to the 1970s with a foreword by Penelope Keith was published in December 2014.

Since 2017 he has lived in Holland where he created ArtsTalk Magazine.

== Public collections owning pictorial works ==
- Arkansas Arts Centre Foundation, Little Rock, Arkansas, US
- Nora Eccles Harrison Museum of Art, Utah State University, Logan, US
- Macedonian Museum of Contemporary Art, Thessaloniki, Greece
- Westmoreland Museum of American Art, Greensburg, PA, US
- Museé d'Art Moderne, Strasbourg, France
- Polaroid (UK) Ltd.,

== Selected bibliography ==
- THESPIANS by Michael Hasted, FeedARead, December 2014
- A THEATRE FOR ALL SEASONS by Michael Hasted, Jeremy Mills Publishing Ltd., England. September 2011
- The Cheltenham Book of Days by Michael Hasted. The History Press, England. March 2013
- Novum Gebrauchsgraphik (Munich) November 1973 pp. 28–33
- Munchner Merkur (Munich) 19 December 1975
- Graphis (Zürich) Spring 1978 p. 539
- Stern (Hamburg) 30 November 1978 p. 162
- Novum Gebrauchsgraphik (Munich) April 1979 pp. 41–50
- Munchner Merkur (Munich) 11 April 1979 p. 9
- Graphik (Munich) August 1979 pp. 24–25
- Leonardo (Paris) Summer 1980 pp. 186–191
- Graphis Annual 83/84 (Zürich) p. 222
- ART SYNECTICS by Nicholas Roukes. Davis Publications Inc. 1984 p. 26
- Novum Gebrauchsgraphik January 1993 pp. 44–47
- Hoggin' the Page by Martyn Hanson. Northdown Publishing 2005 pp 46–51
- Front Cover by Allan Powers, Mitchell Beazley 2006 p. 97
