= Guitar Boogie (album) =

Compilation album by Eric Clapton, Jeff Beck, Jimmy Page
- Released: 1971
- Genre: Blues rock, rock and roll
- Length: 25:24
- Label: RCA Records

Professional ratings
Review scores
Source	Rating
AllMusic	2/5 stars

Guitar Boogie is a blues rock compilation album featuring Eric Clapton, Jeff Beck and Jimmy Page together with the Allstars and members of The Rolling Stones.

The album was released in the US in 1971 by RCA Records; in the mid 1970s, Pickwick Records leased the rights to reissue several recordings in the RCA catalog and Guitar Boogie was briefly re-issued on the Pickwick label in 1977; RCA soon reclaimed the rights to its Pickwick-leased recordings and reissued the album in 1980. The album was compiled by Richard Robinson and originally included a piece by rock critic Richard Meltzer on the back cover. The tracks were collected from Immediate Records' 1968 series of compilation albums Blues Anytime, which were released in the US as An Anthology of British Blues and later under the title British Archives Series: Blues for Collectors.

Most songs on this album were written by Eric Clapton, Jeff Beck or Jimmy Page, and of the three guitarists, only Jimmy Page appears on every track, though not always in a lead role. Clapton was not present for the tracks featuring Jeff Beck, which were recorded with members of Cyril Davies' band the Allstars. Likewise, Beck was not at the session with Clapton, the tracks from which were later overdubbed by Ian Stewart, Mick Jagger, Bill Wyman and Charlie Watts of the Rolling Stones.

"That (Blues Anthology Immediate LP) was a real tragedy for me. I got involved with Immediate, producing various things, including John Mayall's "Witchdoctor", "Telephone Blues" and a couple of others (around late 1965) and Eric and I got friendly and he came down and we did some recording at home, and Immediate found out that I had tapes of it and said they belonged to them, because I was employed by them. I argued that they couldn't put them out because they were just variations of blues structures, and in the end we dubbed some other instruments over some of them and they came out- with liner notes attributed to me (on earlier copies) though I didn't have anything to do with writing them. I didn't get a penny out of it anyway... Stu from the Stones was on piano, Mick Jagger did some harp, Bill Wyman played bass and Charlie Watts was on drums". (Referring to the "Allstars" tracks with Page, Jeff Beck and Nicky Hopkins): "They were tapes Immediate had from a long time before. It was in fact the Cyril Davies All Stars without their guitarist, and they were just tracks we had done for fun after the real session was over."

— Jimmy Page talking to Pete Frame, The Road to Rock: A ZigZag Book of Interviews, p.105, Charisma Books, 1974. (ISBN 0 85947 014 8)

== Track listing ==
Side A

No.	Title	Artist(s)	Length
1.	"Choker"	Eric Clapton with Jimmy Page	1:21
2.	"Snake Drive"	Eric Clapton	2:30
3.	"Draggin' My Tail"	Eric Clapton with Jimmy Page	3:56
4.	"Steelin'"	The Allstars featuring Jeff Beck	2:33
5.	"Freight Loader"	Eric Clapton with Jimmy Page	2:43

Side B

No.	Title	Artist(s)	Length
6.	"West Coast Idea"	Eric Clapton	2:15
7.	"L.A. Breakdown"	The Allstars featuring Jimmy Page	2:02
8.	"Down in the Boots"	The Allstars featuring Jimmy Page	3:22
9.	"Chuckles"	The Allstars featuring Jeff Beck	2:20
10.	"Tribute to Elmore"	Eric Clapton	2:05

=== 1973 German release ===
Side A

No.	Title	Artist(s)	Length
1.	"Tribute to Elmore"	Eric Clapton	2:05
2.	"Steelin'"	The Allstars featuring Jeff Beck	2:33
3.	"Draggin' My Tail"	Eric Clapton with Jimmy Page	3:56
4.	"Freight Loader"	Eric Clapton with Jimmy Page	2:43
5.	"Chuckles"	The Allstars featuring Jeff Beck	2:20

Side B

No.	Title	Artist(s)	Length
6.	"Choker"	Eric Clapton with Jimmy Page	1:21
7.	"L.A. Breakdown"	The Allstars featuring Jimmy Page	2:02
8.	"Snake Drive"	Eric Clapton	2:30
9.	"Down in the Boots"	The Allstars featuring Jimmy Page	3:22
10.	"Miles Road"	Eric Clapton with Jimmy Page	2:26
11.	"West Coast Idea"	Eric Clapton	2:15
