= The Idle Race =

British rock band (1959–1972)

- Also known as: The Nightriders (1959–1966); The Idyll Race (1966)
- Origin: Birmingham, Warwickshire, England
- Genres: Psychedelic rock; psychedelic pop; freakbeat
- Years active: 1959–1972
- Labels: Liberty, Sunset
- Past members: Dave Pritchard; Roger Spencer; Al Johnson; Brian Cope; Billy King; Mike Sheridan; Greg Masters; Roy Wood; Johnny Mann; Jeff Lynne; Mike Hopkins; Dave Walker; Dave Carroll; Bob Lamb; Bob Wilson; Steve Gibbons; Bob Griffin; Trevor Burton

The Idle Race were a British rock group from Birmingham who in the late 1960s and early 1970s had a cult following but never enjoyed mass commercial success. In addition to being the springboard for Jeff Lynne, the band holds a place of significance in British Midlands' pop-rock history as a link between the Move, Electric Light Orchestra, the Steve Gibbons Band and Mike Sheridan & The Nightriders. The group has been retrospectively described as freakbeat.

== Band history ==
=== The Nightriders (1959–1966) ===
The band was initially formed in 1959, under the name Billy King and the Nightriders, and consisted of the core members Dave Pritchard on rhythm guitar and Roger Spencer on drums, along with vocalist Billy King, bass guitarist Brian Cope, and lead guitarist Al Johnson. In 1962, King departed the band and was replaced by Mike Tyler, who changed his surname to Sheridan for performance purposes. This change coincided with the band's rise (as Mike Sheridan and the Nightriders), culminating with a record deal with EMI in 1964. By this time Cope had been replaced by Greg Masters, and Johnson by lead guitarist and composer Roy Wood, in 1963 and 1964, respectively. Wood, who went on to find greater success in his subsequent bands, had his first commercially released composition with The Nightriders, "Make Them Understand", which appeared as the B-side of a 1965 single.

By December 1965, Wood had joined forces with other musicians to form the Move, leading to his departure from the Nightriders in January 1966, when the Move started touring. Wood's place in the Nightriders was filled by Johnny Mann, who had previously performed with Wood's new bandmate in the Move, Carl Wayne, in Wayne's previous band the Vikings. Sheridan, feeling that the band had come full circle, decided to depart the group shortly thereafter—although Sheridan later toured with various musicians using the Nightriders' moniker. The losses of Sheridan and Wood led the band to change direction. The band shortened their name to the Nightriders (dropping Sheridan's name), reflecting the fact that the band was now going to lack a dedicated frontman and would feature various members performing lead vocals. Shortly after signing a new recording contract with Polydor Records, Mann departed and was replaced by Jeff Lynne, who at the time was an unknown guitar prodigy from the Birmingham district of Shard End. Their time at Polydor was short, and they recorded only one single, "It's Only The Dog"/"Your Friend", released in November 1966, with Lynne on lead guitar. Spencer sang lead on the A-side while the B-side was written and sung by Pritchard.

=== The Idle Race (1966–1972) ===
Eager to showcase Lynne's vocal and guitar skills as well as his growing cache of catchy Beatlesque songs, and wishing to embrace the new psychedelic movement, the group changed its name again, first to the Idyll Race and then to the Idle Race. Wood, now a major star as the Move became a successful chart act, helped arrange a partnership with pop producers Eddie Offord and Gerald Chevin for the Idle Race. In 1967, the band were the first major signing by the new British arm of Liberty Records. Only their first single (not issued in the UK) and their first album got released in the US on Liberty.

The group were well received by the music press for their melodies, whimsical lyrics, and inventive production. They often appeared on the same bill with such bands as the Spencer Davis Group, the Who, Small Faces, Pink Floyd, the Moody Blues, Status Quo, Tyrannosaurus Rex, Yes, Free, and the Move. In addition to original material, their set list included extended covers of Steppenwolf's "Born to Be Wild", the Jimi Hendrix Experience's "Purple Haze", Moby Grape's "Hey Grandma," The Lemon Pipers' "Blueberry Blue," The Doors' "Love Me Two Times", and an electric version of "Debora" by Tyrannosaurus Rex.

BBC disc jockeys such as John Peel and Kenny Everett were big boosters of the group. But despite critical respect and famous admirers such as The Beatles and Marc Bolan, Idle Race failed to catch on with the public.

Bad luck sabotaged efforts from the start. Their debut single on Liberty, a cover of Wood's "Here We Go 'Round the Lemon Tree", was scheduled for release and heavily promoted in September 1967. When the Move's version began getting national airplay around the UK as the B-side of the hit "Flowers In The Rain," Liberty abruptly pulled the single in the UK. It was, however, released by Liberty in the US. The record company replaced it in the UK with Lynne's "Impostors of Life's Magazine" in October.

"The Skeleton and the Roundabout" (February 1968) and "The End of the Road" (June 1968) suffered similar fates. Work continued throughout the year on the Idle Race's debut album, the group commuting in from Birmingham to London on Sundays, when they were granted free studio time at Advision. The resulting album, The Birthday Party, was released in October of that year.

Lynne and Wood's mutual respect and friendship deepened. The demo for the Move hit "Blackberry Way" was recorded in Lynne's front room and borrowed motifs from the Idle Race; the chorus of Lynne's 1969 song "Days of the Broken Arrows" lifted part of a riff from the Move's "Wild Tiger Woman".

Lynne received an offer to replace Trevor Burton in the Move in February 1969 but declined with hopes of steering The Idle Race to commercial success — and producing the band's second LP for Liberty.

The self-titled Idle Race was released in September 1969 in the UK with sleeve photography and design by Michael Hasted. The two Lynne-penned and produced singles that preceded the LP, "Days of the Broken Arrows" (April 1969) and "Come With Me" (July 1969) also failed to chart. Idle Race, the first album to be produced by Lynne, flopped.

In January 1970, Lynne accepted a second offer by Wood to join the Move, on condition that they would eventually retire that band and concentrate on a new venture, Electric Light Orchestra.

Lynne made two albums, Looking On and Message from the Country, and a handful of singles with the Move, including the first version of "Do Ya", as work on the first ELO album continued in the studio throughout 1970 and 1971. The Move, now comprising just Wood, Lynne and drummer Bev Bevan, ceased touring in 1970, and adopted the name ELO permanently in 1972.

Meanwhile, Mike Hopkins (guitar) and Dave Walker (vocals) were hired to replace Lynne in the Idle Race. A cover of Mungo Jerry's "In the Summertime" on Liberty in 1970 finally got them into the top 10 in Argentina. A cover of Hotlegs' "Neanderthal Man" did not fare as well. In 1971 the band produced their final album, Time Is, for Regal Zonophone (UK only); despite this, the band collapsed shortly thereafter with the departures of remaining founding members Pritchard and Spencer (who later became comic "Ollie Spencer"), along with Hopkins and Walker. Sole remaining member Greg Masters built another version of the band with guitarists Dave Carroll and Bob Wilson and drummer Bob Lamb, with Steve Gibbons being recruited later as front-man. Ultimately, this lineup was short-lived: Masters himself departed in February 1972 and was replaced by Bob Griffin, whose tenure in the band was brief and who was replaced by former the Move member Trevor Burton. The Idle Race then, finally, disbanded, with the final lineup becoming the founding lineup of the Steve Gibbons Band.

== Personnel ==
=== Members ===
- Dave Pritchard – rhythm guitar, vocals, flute (1959–1971)
- Roger Spencer – drums, vocals (1959–1971)
- Al Johnson – lead guitar (1959–1964)
- Brian Cope – bass guitar (1959–1963)
- Billy King – vocals (1959–1962)
- Mike Sheridan – vocals (1962–1966)
- Greg Masters – bass guitar, vocals (1963–1972; died 2025)
- Roy Wood – lead guitar, vocals (1964–1966)
- Johnny Mann – lead guitar (1966)
- Jeff Lynne – lead guitar, piano, vocals (1966–1970)
- Mike Hopkins – lead guitar, vocals (1970–1971)
- Dave Walker – vocals, harmonica, piano (1970–1971)
- Dave Carroll – guitar (1971–1972)
- Bob Lamb – drums (1971–1972)
- Bob Wilson – guitar (1971–1972)
- Steve Gibbons – vocals (1971–1972)
- Bob Griffin – bass guitar (1972)
- Trevor Burton – bass guitar (1972)

=== Line-ups ===
1959–1962 (Billy King and the Nightriders)	1962–1963 (Mike Sheridan and the Nightriders)	1963–1964	1964–1966
Brian Cope – bass guitar; Al Johnson – lead guitar; Billy King – vocals; Dave Pritchard – rhythm guitar; Roger Spencer – drums	Brian Cope – bass guitar; Al Johnson – lead guitar; Dave Pritchard – rhythm guitar; Roger Spencer – drums; Mike Sheridan – vocals	Al Johnson – lead guitar; Dave Pritchard – rhythm guitar; Roger Spencer – drums; Mike Sheridan – vocals; Greg Masters – bass guitar	Dave Pritchard – rhythm guitar; Roger Spencer – drums; Mike Sheridan – vocals; Greg Masters – bass guitar; Roy Wood – lead guitar, vocals
1966	1966 (The Nightriders)	1966–1970 (The Nightriders / The Idyll Race / The Idle Race)	1970–1971
Dave Pritchard – rhythm guitar; Roger Spencer – drums; Mike Sheridan – vocals; Greg Masters – bass guitar; Johnny Mann – lead guitar	Dave Pritchard – rhythm guitar, vocals; Roger Spencer – drums, vocals; Greg Masters – bass guitar, vocals; Johnny Mann – lead guitar	Dave Pritchard – rhythm guitar, vocals; Roger Spencer – drums, vocals; Greg Masters – bass guitar, vocals; Jeff Lynne – lead guitar, keyboards, vocals	Dave Pritchard – rhythm guitar, vocals; Roger Spencer – drums, vocals; Greg Masters – bass guitar, vocals; Mike Hopkins – lead guitar, vocals; Dave Walker – vocals
1971	1971–1972	1972	1972
Greg Masters – bass guitar, vocals; Dave Carroll – guitar; Bob Lamb – drums; Bob Wilson – guitar	Greg Masters – bass guitar, vocals; Dave Carroll – guitar; Bob Lamb – drums; Bob Wilson – guitar; Steve Gibbons – vocals	Dave Carroll – guitar; Bob Lamb – drums; Bob Wilson – guitar; Steve Gibbons – vocals; Bob Griffin – bass guitar	Dave Carroll – guitar; Bob Lamb – drums; Bob Wilson – guitar; Steve Gibbons – vocals; Trevor Burton – bass guitar

== Discography ==
=== Albums ===
- The Birthday Party (October 1968) (issued in UK and US)
- Idle Race (September 1969) (UK Only) Sleeve by Michael Hasted
- Time Is (May 1971) (UK only)

=== Singles ===
- "Here We Go 'Round the Lemon Tree"/"My Father's Son" (not issued in UK but issued in Europe and US) 1967
- "Imposters of Life's Magazine"/"Sitting in My Tree" (Liberty LBF 15026) October 1967 (UK only)
  - "Imposters of Life's Magazine" was erroneously credited to "G. Lynn"
- "The Skeleton and the Roundabout"/"Knocking Nails Into My House" (Liberty LBF 15054) February 1968 (UK only)
- "The End of the Road"/"Morning Sunshine" (Liberty LBF 15101) June 1968 (UK only)
- "I Like My Toys"/"Birthday" (Liberty LBF 15129) 1968 *Unissued*
- "Days of Broken Arrows"/"Worn Red Carpet" (Liberty LBF 15218) April 1969 (UK only)
  - "Worn Red Carpet" was erroneously issued as "Warm Red Carpet" on the UK Liberty single
- "Come With Me"/"Reminds Me of You" (Liberty LBF 15242) July 1969 (UK only)
- "In the Summertime"/"Told You Twice" (not issued in UK or US but issued in other countries) 1970
- "Neanderthal Man"/"Victim of Circumstance" (not issued in UK or US but issued in Canada) 1970
- "Dancing Flower"/"Bitter Green" (Regal Zonophone RZ 3036) 1971 (UK only)

=== Compilation albums ===
- Impostors of Life's Magazine (Daffodil DDAF10046) 1974 (2-record set, Canada)
- Best of Idle Race Featuring Jeff Lynne 1990 (1 CD, UK only)
- Jeff Lynne - A Message From The Country 1968-1973 1990 (1 CD) Also features tracks by the Move and the Electric Light Orchestra. A companion disc, You Can Dance the Rock and Roll, focuses on Lynne's Move and ELO bandmate Roy Wood.
- Back to the Story 1996 (Re-issued 2007, 2 CDs)
- A 5-disc Idle Race box (with Nightriders tracks) has supposedly been in the works since 2007, although a release date has yet to be determined.

== Cover versions of the Idle Race songs ==
- "The Birthday" was recorded by The Fall with vocals by then-band member Lucy Rimmer and no apparent contributions from bandleader Mark E. Smith; it was released as "Birthday" on their 1996 compilation album Sinister Waltz. (The Idle Race are also mentioned in the lyrics of The Fall's 1978 song "No Xmas for John Quays".)
- Ambrose Slade (pre-Slade) covered "Knocking Nails Into My House" on their 1969 Beginnings.
- Tinkerbells Fairydust covered "Follow Me Follow" as the B-side to their January 1969 Decca Records release (Decca – F12865) "Sheila's Back In Town".
- Finnish band Spider covered "Follow Me Follow" on their second album, 1980.
- "Morning Sunshine" was covered by Jeremy as part of the Lynne Me Your Ears tribute collection to Jeff Lynne in 2001.
- "I Like My Toys" was covered by radio DJ Ed Stewart (under the name Stewpot) and the Save the Children Fund Choir.
- "End of the Road", "I Like My Toys", "The Skeleton and the Roundabout" and "Sitting in My Tree" were covered by Norwegian pop group The Tables on their 7-inch EP The Tables play The Idle Race (Kippers Records, 2000).
- "Days Of Broken Arrows" was covered by The Liquor Giants on the album Something Special For The Kids in 1998.
- "On With The Show" was covered by Pugwash as a double-A-side with "At the Sea" released in 2010. The chorus vocals are provided by Neil Hannon of The Divine Comedy.
- The Move recorded a BBC session in which they covered "The Birthday" with Roy Wood singing lead.
- Mauri Martínez from Old Future Crash covered "Please No More Sad Songs" on 2021. Available on YouTube.
- Sheridan & Price included “Please No More Sad Songs” on the album This is to Certify.
- The Tremeloes recorded “Please No More Sad Songs” with an alternative middle 8.
