= The Groundhogs =

British blues and rock band

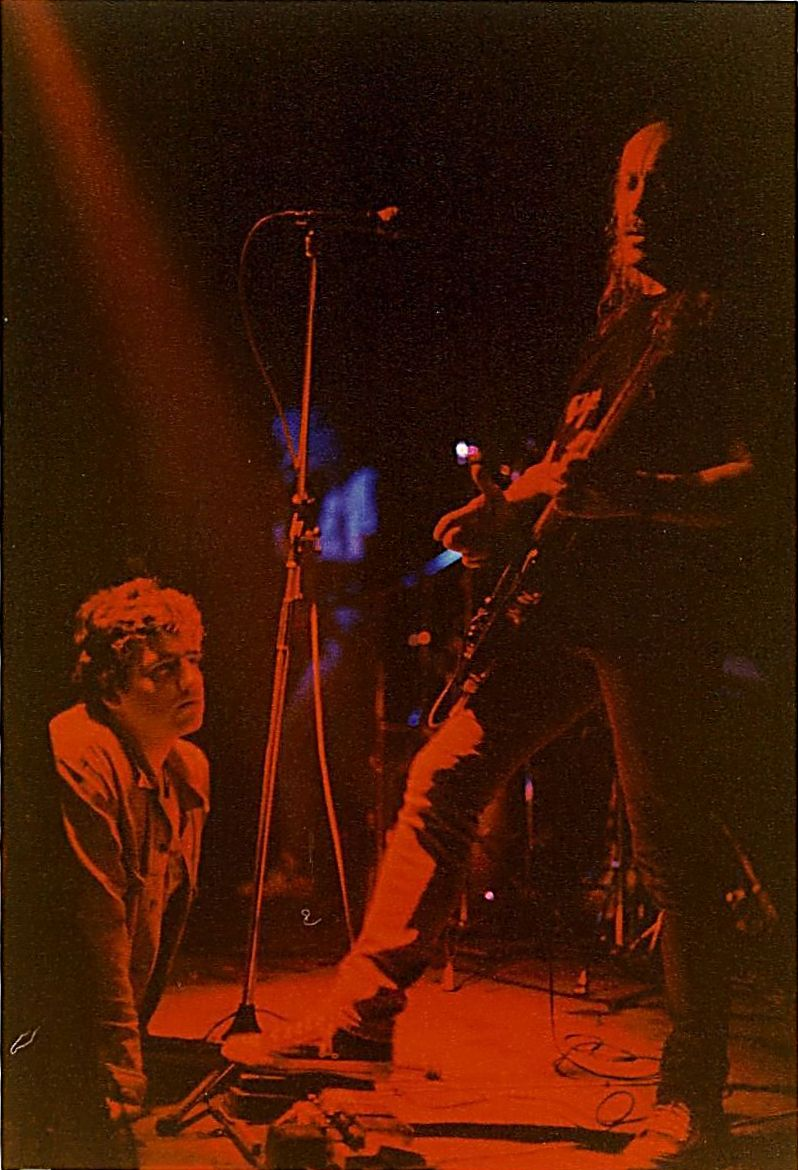
- Tony McPhee playing in the Groundhogs at the Sir George Robey, London, 1991

Background information
- Origin: England
- Genres: Blues; blues rock; acid rock; progressive rock
- Years active: 1963–2014
- Labels: Fire; Liberty; United Artists
- Past members: Tony McPhee; Dave Anderson; Joanna Deacon; Carl Stokes

The Groundhogs were an English blues and rock band founded in late 1963 in London. Named after John Lee Hooker's song "Ground Hog Blues", they were part of the burgeoning British rhythm and blues scene, backing Hooker on his album ...And Seven Nights.

They were predominantly a power trio of Tony McPhee (singer, guitarist, song-writer), Peter Cruickshank (bass) and Ken Pustelnik (drums), with Clive Brooks replacing Pustelnik in 1972 until the band split in 1974. They issued seven albums via Liberty/UA, including the UK Top 10 Thank Christ for the Bomb (1970, #9), Split (1971, #5) and Who Will Save the World? (1972, #8). These albums were rooted in blues rock, but occasionally showed touches of progressive and psychedelic rock.

McPhee resurrected the name with a different rhythm section in 1975 for two more studio albums, and again from 1982 to 2003 for a further two studio albums. A reunion of the early 1970s trio in 2003 featured McPhee, with Cruickshank and Pustelnik continuing afterwards as The Groundhogs Rhythm Section.

McPhee resurrected the name again in 2007 through to 2014, although only for live performances.

== Career ==
=== Early years, 1962–1967 ===
The band was originally formed as the Dollar Bills in New Cross, London, in 1962 by brothers John and Peter Cruickshank (born in 1943 and 2 July 1945 respectively in Calcutta, West Bengal, India). Tony McPhee (born 23 March 1944, died 6 June 2023), the lead guitarist in the instrumental group the Seneschals, joined the group later that year. McPhee steered them towards the blues and renamed them after the John Lee Hooker song "Ground Hog Blues".

At John Cruickshank's suggestion, they became John Lee's Groundhogs when they backed Hooker on his 1964 UK tour. They later supported Little Walter, Jimmy Reed and Champion Jack Dupree when they toured the UK. McPhee featured on Dupree's From New Orleans to Chicago (1966) alongside Eric Clapton. Groundhogs issued "Shake It" backed with "Rock Me" on the Interphon record label in January 1965.

=== Success with Liberty Records, 1968–1974 ===
The line-up on their first album, Scratchin' the Surface, produced by the 19-year-old head of A&R for Liberty Records, Mike Batt, and released in November 1968, consisted of McPhee as singer and guitarist, bassist Peter Cruickshank, Ken Pustelnik (born 13 March 1946 on a farm near Blairgowrie, Angus, Scotland) on drums and Steve Rye (born 8 March 1946 in London – died 19 July 1992, in London) on harmonica.

Rye left the band leaving them as a power trio to record Blues Obituary (September 1969), titled after McPhee "realised that the audience for 12-bar blues was dwindling". A single from the album, "B.D.D." (Blind Deaf Dumb), flopped in the UK but peaked at number one in Lebanon.

The group's next three studio albums, Thank Christ for the Bomb (May 1970), Split (March 1971) and Who Will Save the World? The Mighty Groundhogs (March 1972) were commercial and critical successes, reaching the Top 10 in the UK Albums Chart. Thank Christ for the Bomb, titled by manager Roy Fisher who was hoping for some post-Lennon controversy, was promoted with BBC Radio 1 appearances on the In Concert programme from Paris Cinema on 14 May, and a radio session for Mike Harding on 21 July.

Split peaked at number 5 and spent 27 weeks on the UK Albums Chart and achieved gold record status. The first side of the album was a four part suite inspired by McPhee having "a mental aberration ... a panic attack that lasted a few months". They supported the Rolling Stones on their The Rolling Stones UK Tour 1971 in March at the request of Mick Jagger and their performance at Leeds University was recorded and later released in 1984 as part of the Hoggin' the Stage double album and subsequently re-released as Live at Leeds in 1998. The single "Cherry Red" released from the album was featured on BBC Television's Top of the Pops programme on 15 April, and the group performed studio sessions for BBC Radio 1's Mike Raven's R&B show on 17 February, John Peel programme on 29 April, and Mike Harding show on 29 March and 26 July.

Who Will Save the World? The Mighty Groundhogs was promoted in 1972 with BBC Radio In Concert broadcast on 24 February, and a session on 29 February at Maida Vale 4 for John Peel.

Pustelnik left during 1972 and Clive Brooks from the band Egg joined on drums for Hogwash, released in November. The group made their first tour of North America, but a horse riding accident suffered by McPhee ended their visit early. They made another appearance on the In Concert programme from Paris Theatre on 7 December.

The Solid album of 1974 saw a last return to the charts. A further live concert from Playhouse Theatre on 23 May was broadcast on the BBC Radio 1 In Concert programme .

The group broke up later in 1974, although the trio of McPhee, Cruickshank and Pustelnick recorded one final session for BBC Radio 1's John Peel show on 6 March 1975 at Maida Vale studios.

=== New line-up, 1975–1976 ===
McPhee resurrected the name in 1975 with a new line-up of Martin Kent and Mick Cook on bass and drums respectively, and a second guitarist of either Dave Wellbelove or Rick Adams. Two albums, Crosscut Saw and Black Diamond, were released in 1976 by UA.

=== New line-up, 1982–2003 ===
McPhee put together a new trio with Alan Fish on bass and Wilgar Campbell on drums, and after Mick Kirton had replaced Campbell issued the studio album Razor's Edge (1985), and the live album No Surrender recorded during the tour of the album was given a belated release in 1988.

A new rhythm section of bassist Dave Anderson and drummer Mick Jones recorded Back Against the Wall (1986) at Anderson's Foel Studio and released on his Demi Monde label, and this trio also issued the live album Hogs On The Road recorded during a tour of Germany in December 1987.

The group's personnel continued to be changed; a live album Who Said Cherry Red? was recorded with Pete Chymon (bass) and Dale Iviss (drums) at a "secret location" in 1996, and two studio albums with Eric Chipulina and Pete Correa, Hogs in Wolf's Clothing (1998) in tribute to Howlin' Wolf and The Muddy Waters Song Book (1999) in tribute to Muddy Waters were released, being the last studio recordings issued as The Groundhogs.

In 2003, original manager Roy Fisher put together a short-lived 'original line-up' to celebrate their fortieth anniversary. McPhee left the band to pursue an acoustic career, embarking on a major tour in 2004 with Edgar Winter and Alvin Lee and issued an acoustic blues album Blues at Ten.

=== The Groundhogs Rhythm Section, 2004–2014 ===
After McPhee's departure from the 2003 re-union, Cruickshank and Pustelnik continued forming The Groundhogs Rhythm Section with invited frontmen, latterly with Eddie Martin. The Groundhogs Rhythm Section's last recruits, Bob Bowles (guitar, vocals) and Jon Buckett (guitars, keyboards, vocals), joined Pustelnik and Cruickshank in February 2011.

=== Final line-up, 2007–2014 ===
McPhee put together a new band in 2007, with long-time Groundhogs bassist Dave Anderson (ex-Hawkwind) and Marco Anderson on drums. This trio toured the UK in 2008 with Focus and Martin Turner's Wishbone Ash. The 2009 line-up of Tony McPhee's Groundhogs comprised McPhee, Anderson and previous long-term drummer Mick Jones. As of 2011, the new Groundhogs' line-up consisted of McPhee, Anderson, Joanna Deacon (vocals), and Carl Stokes (drums) from the death rock band Cancer.

Due to McPhee's ongoing health issues relating to a stroke in 2009, Tony McPhee & Groundhogs retired in January 2014, although McPhee and Stokes have since worked with David Tibet's Current 93. McPhee died on 6 June 2023.

== Musical style ==
Groundhogs initially formed as a blues band, but subsequently began incorporating elements of rock, psychedelic, progressive music and space rock into their sound. Prog magazine wrote, "the four albums they recorded between 1970 and 1972 – Thank Christ for the Bomb, Split, Who Will Save The World? and Hogwash – saw the band become increasingly ambitious, both compositionally and conceptually, with the deployment of Mellotron and synth helping to create an exciting progressive/blues rock hybrid". The band was also described as a "shapeshifting blues/acid-rock power trio".

== Personnel ==
=== Members ===
Former members

- Joanna Deacon – vocals (2001–2003, 2011–2014)
- Tony McPhee – guitars, vocals (1963–1974, 1976, 1982–2004, 2007–2014; died 2023)
- Dave Anderson – bass (1986–1988, 2001–2003, 2007–2014)
- Carl Stokes – drums (2011–2014)
- Peter Cruickshank – bass (1963–1974, 2003–2004)
- Dave Boorman – drums (1963–1965)
- Bob Hall – keyboards (1963–1965)
- John Cruickshank – harmonica, vocals (1963–1964)
- Ken Pustelnik – drums (1965–1972, 2003–2004)
- Tom Parker – keyboards (1965)
- Steve Rye – harmonica (1969; died 1992)
- Clive Brooks – drums (1972–1974; died 2017)
- Dave Thompson – bass (1972)
- Mick Cook – drums (1976; died 1997)
- Martin Kent – bass (1976)
- Dave Wellbelove – guitars (1976)
- Rick Adams – guitars (1976)
- Alan Fish – bass (1982–1994)
- Wilgar Campbell – drums (1982–1984; died 1989)
- "Mighty" Joe Young – guitars (1982–1983)
- Mick Kirton – drums (1984–1989)
- Mick Jones – drums (1989–1994, 1999–2003, 2009–2011)
- Chris Bennett – drums (1990–1991)
- Jon Camp – bass (1989)
- Eric Chipulina – bass, live guitars (1994–1996, 1996–1999)
- Pete Correa – drums (1994–1996, 1996–1999)
- Pete Chymon – bass (1996)
- Dale Iviss – drums (1996)
- Brian Jones – bass (1999–2001)
- Marco Anderson – drums (2007–2009)

=== Lineups ===
1963–1964	1964–1965	1965	1965–1969
John Cruickshank – harmonica, vocals; Tony McPhee – guitars, vocals; Bob Hall – keyboards; Peter Cruickshank – bass; Dave Boorman – drums	Tony McPhee – guitars, vocals; Bob Hall – keyboards; Peter Cruickshank – bass; Dave Boorman – drums	Tony McPhee – guitars, vocals; Tom Parker – keyboards; Peter Cruickshank – bass; Ken Pustelnik – drums	Tony McPhee – guitars, vocals; Peter Cruickshank – bass; Ken Pustelnik – drums
1969	1969–1972	1972	1972–1974
Tony McPhee – guitars, vocals; Steve Rye – harmonica; Peter Cruickshank – bass; Ken Pustelnik – drums	Tony McPhee – guitars, vocals; Peter Cruickshank – bass; Ken Pustelnik – drums	Tony McPhee – guitars, vocals; Peter Cruickshank – bass; Dave Thompson – bass; Clive Brooks – drums	Tony McPhee – guitars, vocals; Peter Cruickshank – bass; Clive Brooks – drums
1974–1975	1975–1976	1976	1976–1982
Disbanded	Tony McPhee – guitars, vocals; Dave Wellbelove – guitars; Martin Kent – bass; Mick Cook – drums	Tony McPhee – guitars, vocals; Rick Adams – guitars; Martin Kent – bass; Mick Cook – drums	Disbanded
1982–1983	1983–1984	1984–1987	1987–1988
Tony McPhee – guitars, vocals; "Mighty" Joe Young – guitars; Alan Fish – bass; Wilgar Campbell – drums	Tony McPhee – guitars, vocals; Alan Fish – bass; Wilgar Campbell – drums	Tony McPhee – guitars, vocals; Alan Fish – bass; Mick Kirton – drums	Tony McPhee – guitars, vocals; Alan Fish – bass; Dave Anderson – bass; Mick Kirton – drums
1988–1989	1989	1989–1994	1994–1996
Tony McPhee – guitars, vocals; Alan Fish – bass; Mick Kirton – drums	Tony McPhee – guitars, vocals; Alan Fish – bass; Jon Camp – bass; Mick Jones – drums; Chris Bennett – drums	Tony McPhee – guitars, vocals; Alan Fish – bass; Mick Jones – drums	Tony McPhee – guitars, vocals; Eric Chipulina – bass, live guitars; Pete Correa – drums
1996	1996–2000	2000–2001	2001
Tony McPhee – guitars, vocals; Pete Chymon – bass; Dale Iviss – drums	Tony McPhee – guitars, vocals; Eric Chipulina – bass, live guitars; Pete Correa – drums	Tony McPhee – guitars, vocals; Brian Jones – bass; Mick Jones – drums	Tony McPhee – guitars, vocals; Mick Jones – drums; Jon Camp – bass
2001–2003	2003–2004	2004–2007	2007–2009
Joanna Deacon – vocals; Tony McPhee – guitars, vocals; Dave Anderson – bass; Mick Jones – drums	Tony McPhee – guitars, vocals; Peter Cruickshank – bass; Ken Pustelnik – drums	Disbanded	Tony McPhee – guitars, vocals; Dave Anderson – bass; Marco Anderson – drums
2009–2011	2011–2014
Tony McPhee – guitars, vocals; Dave Anderson – bass; Mick Jones – drums	Joanna Deacon – vocals; Tony McPhee – guitars, vocals; Dave Anderson – bass; Carl Stokes – drums

=== The Groundhogs rhythm section ===
Current members

- Bob Bowles – guitars, vocals (2011–2014)
- Jon Buckett – guitars, keyboards, vocals (2011–2014)
- Peter Cruickshank – bass (2004–2014)
- Ken Pustelnik – drums (2004–2014)

Former members

- Chas Depaolo – guitars, vocals (2004–2006)
- Dave Weld – guitars, vocals (2004–2006)
- Eddie Martin – guitars, vocals (2006–2011)

== Discography ==
=== Albums ===
as Groundhogs:

=== Studio albums ===
- Scratching the Surface (December 1968)
- Blues Obituary (September 1969)
- Thank Christ for the Bomb (May 1970) – UK Number 9
- Split (March 1971) – UK Number 5
- Who Will Save the World? The Mighty Groundhogs (March 1972) – UK Number 8, US Number 202
- Hogwash (October 1972)
- Solid (June 1974) – UK Number 31
- Crosscut Saw (February 1976)
- Black Diamond (October 1976)
- Razor's Edge (May 1985)
- Back Against the Wall (July 1987)
- Hogs in Wolf's Clothing (January 1998)
- Muddy Waters Songbook (April 1999)

=== Live ===
- Hoggin' the Stage (April 1984) – Recorded in Leeds and London in 1971 and Stockholm in 1976.
- Extremely Live (July 1988)
- Hogs on the Road (June 1988) – Recorded in Germany in December 1987
- No Surrender (August 1989)
- Groundhog Night (July 1993)
- Who Said Cherry Red? (October 1996)
- Live at Leeds '71 (August 1998) – Featuring the five tracks recorded in Leeds previously released on "Hoggin' The Stage"
- No Surrender – Razors Edge Tour 1985 (1998) – Recorded in Northfleet, Kent, in 1985
- UK Tour '76 (1999)
- U.S. Tour '72 (1999) (Akarma Records)
- Live at the Astoria (September 2001) – Recorded at the Astoria, London, on 20 February 1998.
- Live at the New York Club, Switzerland 1991 (2007)
- Live at Anti WAA Festival 1989 (CD, 2014; Nibelung Records)
- Christmas Marketing in Weiden (Download 2017) (Nibelung Records)
- Road Hogs: Live from Richmond to Pocono (3LP/2CD, 2021) (Fire Records) – Live at Richmond Athletic Ground, London, England, 7 November 1969 & at Pocono Raceway, Pennsylvania, USA, on 8 July 1972

=== Radio sessions and in concert ===
- BBC Radio One Live In Concert (1994, Windsong International) from 24 February 1972 and 23 May 1974
- Groundhogs On Air 1970–72 (1998, Strange Fruit) from 21 July 1970, 29 March 1971, 26 July 1971 and 7 December 1972
- The Radio 1 Sessions (2002, Strange Fruit) from 21 July 1970, 17 February 1971, 29 March 1971 and 26 July 1971
- BBC Live In Concert (2002, Strange Fruit) from 24 February 1972, 7 December 1972 and 23 May 1974

=== Compilations ===
- Groundhogs Best 1969–1972 (March 1974)
- Moving Fast, Standing Still (May 1986) – compilation of Razor's Edge and The Two Sides of T.S. McPhee plus four mid-1960s tracks
- The Best Of (May 1997) – compilation from the first six studio albums
- 54146 (October 2001) – compilation of Back Against The Wall and Hogs On The Road
- Thank Christ For The Groundhogs: The Liberty Years (1968–1972) (2010)
- The United Artists Years (1972–1976) (2013)

Tony McPhee (solo):

- The Two Sides of T.S. McPhee (1973)
- The Blues and the Beast (1991) (Nibelung Records)
- Foolish Pride (February 1993)
- Slide, T.S., Slide (1996)
- Bleaching the Blues (April 1997)

With John Lee Hooker:

- ...And Seven Nights with John Lee Hooker (Verve Folkways, 1965)

=== DVDs and videos ===
- Live at the Astoria (1999) [video]
- 60/40 Split (2005) [DVD]
- Live at Anti WAA Festival 1989 (DVD, 2014; Nibelung Records)

== Bibliography ==
- Hanson, Martyn (2005). Hoggin' The Page: Groundhogs: The Classic Years. Northdown Publishing. ISBN 978-1-900711-16-6.
