= Jo Ann Kelly =

English blues singer and guitarist

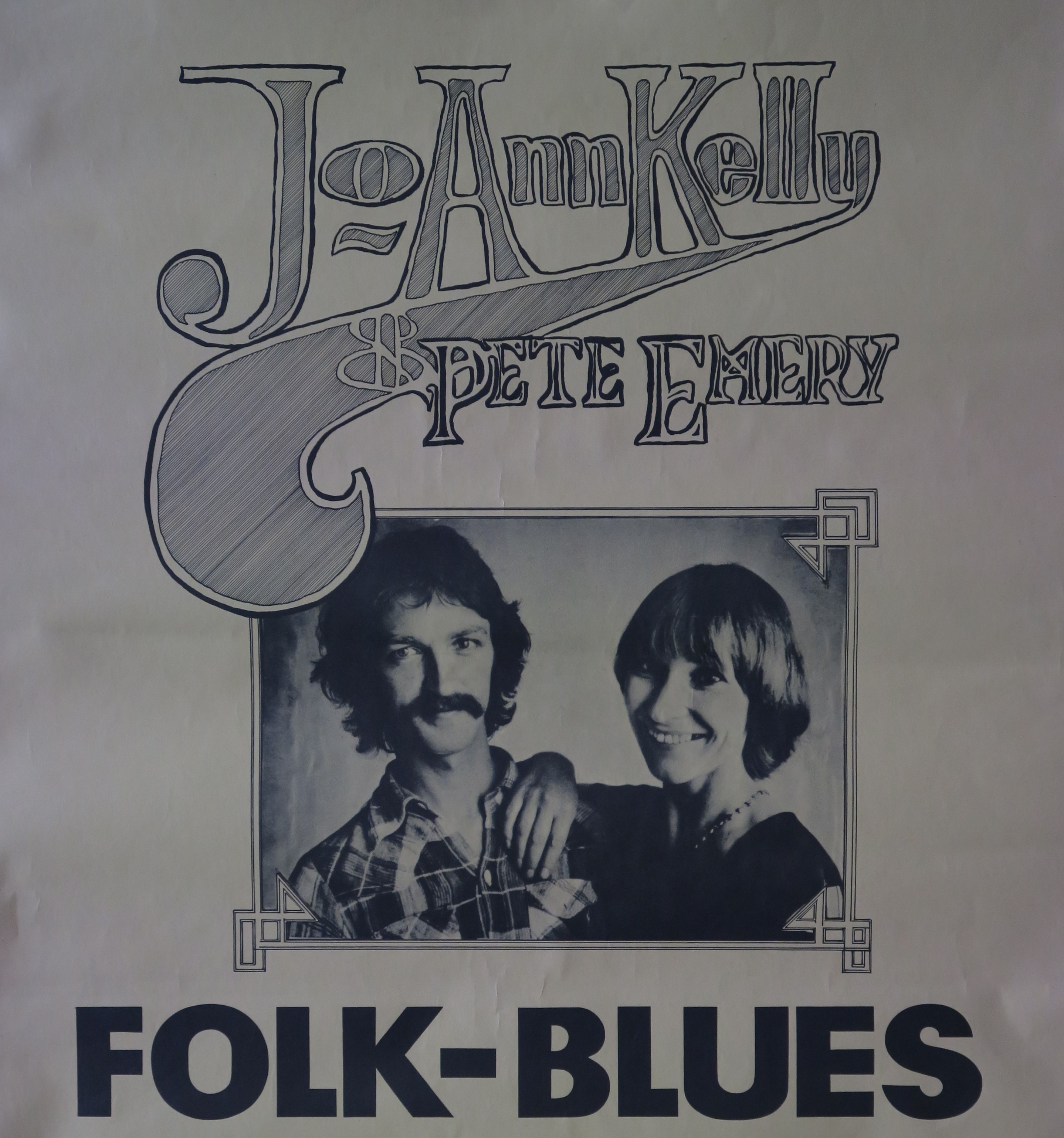
- Jo-Ann Kelly and Pete Emery on a record for Folk-Blues

Background information
- Born: 5 January 1944; Streatham, South London, England
- Died: 21 October 1990 (aged 46)
- Genre: Blues
- Instruments: Singer, Six and 12-string guitar, bottleneck guitar
- Years active: 1962–1990
- Labels: Blue Goose; Columbia; Epic; Immediate; Red Rag

Jo Ann Kelly (5 January 1944 – 21 October 1990) was an English blues singer and guitarist. She is respected for her strong blues vocal style and for playing country blues guitar.

== Early life ==
Kelly was born in Streatham, South London, England on 5 January 1944. She had two younger siblings, Susan and Dave. Her early interest in performing music grew out of hearing the Everly Brothers, Elvis Presley, Little Richard and skiffle in the late 1950s. She learned three or four guitar chords from her brother, Dave Kelly.

== Career ==
She appeared on several compilation albums with her first in 1966 being New Sounds In Folk and then two years later on Blues Anytime Vol. 1: An Anthology Of British Blues (1968) Immediate Records before releasing her first solo album titled Jo-Ann Kelly (1969), this was issued on CBS in the UK and Epic Records in the US. She was also a core member of the band Tramp along with her brother Dave Kelly.

Jo-Ann and Dave Kelly helped raise donations for Memphis Minnie in the 1960s.

Canned Heat and Johnny Winter both tried to recruit Kelly, but she preferred to stay in the United Kingdom. She expanded to the European club circuit, where she worked with guitarist Pete Emery and other bands. In the early 1980s, she was a member of the Terry Smith Blues Band.

== Death ==
In 1988, Kelly began to suffer from headaches. In 1989 she had an operation to remove a malignant brain tumour. She died on 21 October 1990 in England, aged 46.

Obituaries for Kelly appeared in major UK newspapers, including The Independent, The Times, and The Guardian. Remembrances and obituaries also appeared in contemporary Blues magazines such as Blues & Rhythm and the British Blues Review

The obituary in The Independent remarked, "To many American performers Jo Ann Kelly was the only British singer to earn their respect for her development of what they would be justified in thinking as 'their' genre".

== Discography ==
=== Primary releases ===
- Jo-Ann Kelly: Blues & Gospel (No label, 1968) – EP with four songs, pressing limited to 99 copies. All original recordings are included on Retrospect 1964-72.
- Jo-Ann Kelly (Epic, 1969)
- Same Thing on Their Minds (Sunset, 1969) – With Tony McPhee.
- Jo Ann Kelly With John Fahey, Woody Mann, John Miller, Alan Seidler (Blue Goose, 1972)
- Do It (Red Rag, 1976) – With Peter Emery.
- Just Restless, The Jo Ann Kelly Band (Appaloosa, 1984)
- Jo Ann (Open, 1988)
- Woman in (E)Motion Festival (Tradition & Moderne, 1995) – Recorded in Germany, 1988.

=== Compilations ===
- Retrospect 1964-72 (Connoisseur Collection Document, 1990)
- Key To The Highway: Rare And Unissued Recordings 1968-1974 (Mooncrest, 1999)
- Talkin' Low: Rare And Unissued Recordings 1966-1988, volume 2 (Mooncrest, 2000)
- Tramp 1974: Rare And Unissued Recordings, volume 3 (Mooncrest, 2001)
- Black Rat Swing: The Collectors' Jo Ann Kelly (Castle, 2003)
- Blues & Gospel: Rare and Unreleased Recordings (Blues Matters!, 2004)
- Do It & more (Manhaton, 2008) – Songs from Do It (1976) plus additional songs.
- I Asked For Water, She Gave Me Gasoline (Imperial – LP-12455 1969)

=== Featured ===
- Standing At The Burying Ground, Mississippi Fred McDowell (Red Lightnin', 1984) – Recorded live at the Mayfair Hotel, London, UK, 8 March 1969, featuring Jo Ann Kelly, liner notes by Jo Ann Kelly.
- Hard Cash, (1990)
- Been Here And Gone, Woody Mann, Jo Ann Kelly and Son House (Acoustic Music Records, 1999) – Recorded 1971–72, Kelly plays on eight songs.
- Memphis 69': The 1969 Memphis Country Blues Festival. Concert film. Kelly played one song accompanied by guitarist "Backwards" Sam Firk. Directed by Joe LaMatting, Produced by Bruce Watson and Lisa LaMattina. Executive Producers: Mathew Johnson, Bruce Watson, Gene Rosenthal. Fat Possum Records, 2019.

== See also ==
- List of British blues musicians
- British blues
- Tony McPhee
- John Dummer Band
- Tramp (band)
