= Tony McPhee =

English musician (1944–2023)

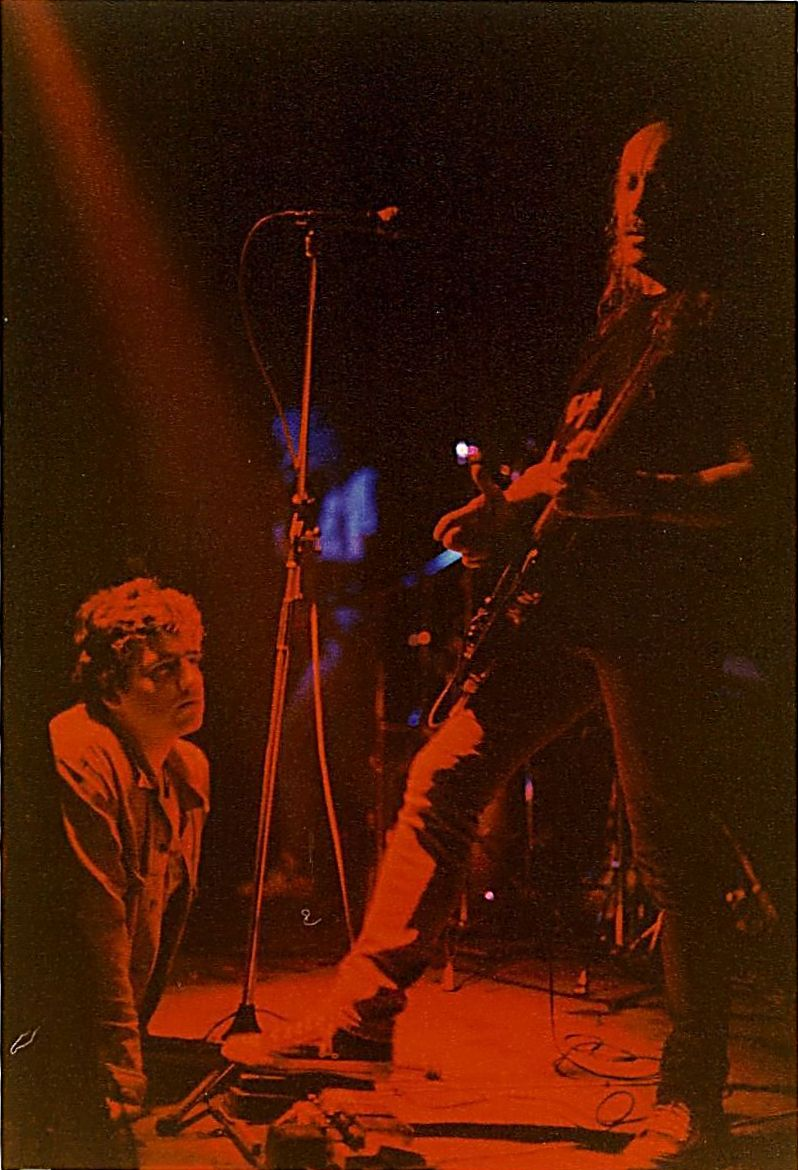
- McPhee with The Groundhogs, London, September 1991

Background information
- Also known as: "T.S." McPhee
- Born: Anthony Charles McPhee; 23 March 1944; Humberston, Lincolnshire, England
- Died: 6 June 2023 (aged 79)
- Genres: Blues; avant-garde; psychedelia; blues rock; R&B
- Occupation: Musician
- Instruments: Guitar; vocals
- Formerly of: Groundhogs
- Website: http://www.thegroundhogs.co.uk/

Anthony Charles McPhee (23 March 1944 – 6 June 2023) was an English guitarist and singer. He was the founder of the British blues and rock band the Groundhogs.

== Career ==
McPhee was given the name "T.S." — standing for "Tough Shit" — when he released a duet single with Champion Jack Dupree — titled "Get Your Head Happy!" — in 1966. Producer Mike Vernon suggested adding to McPhee's last name in order to make it look more like an official blues name.

The Groundhogs backed Dupree and John Lee Hooker on UK concerts in the mid-1960s. The band evolved into a blues-rock trio that produced three UK Top 10 albums in the UK in the early 1970s.

In 1973, McPhee released a solo album titled The Two Sides of Tony (T.S.) McPhee. Side A of this record is blues rock, and Side B is a single psychedelic art rock electronic composition in four movements, featuring Arp 2600 synthesizers, electric piano, and The Rhythm Ace drum synthesizer. Entitled The Hunt, it explores McPhee's strong stance against fox and stag hunting. McPhee also released many other solo acoustic blues records, as well as duets with Jo Ann Kelly.

Apart from the Groundhogs, McPhee played with Herbal Mixture, the John Dummer Band, Hapshash and the Coloured Coat, Tony McPhee's Terraplane, Tony McPhee's Turbo, the Tony McPhee Band, and Current 93.

McPhee's definitive biography, written by Paul Freestone, was published in 2012.

== Health issues and death ==
In 2009, McPhee suffered a stroke, which affected his speech and ability to sing.

McPhee died on 6 June 2023 of complications from a fall that occurred the previous year. He was 79.

== Solo discography ==
- 1966 Ain't Gonna Cry No More – Someone to Love Me
- 1966 You Don't Love Me When You Gotta Good Friend
- 1968 Me and the Devil – various artists
- 1969 I Asked for Water – various artists
- 1971 Same Thing on Their Minds
- 1973 When You Got A Good Friend - various artists
- 1973 Two Sides of Tony McPhee
- 1991 The Blues and the Beast
- 1993 Foolish Pride
- 1996 Slide, T.S., Slide
- 1997 Bleachin' the Blues
- 2000 Live in Poland at Blues Express
- 2004 Blues at Ten
