= Legacy: The Absolute Best =

Greatest hits album by the Doors
- Released: August 12, 2003
- Recorded: 1966–1971
- Genre: Rock
- Length: 155:49
- Labels: Elektra; Rhino
- Compilers: The Doors; David McLees

The Doors chronology
Live in Hollywood (2002)	Legacy: The Absolute Best (2003)	Boot Yer Butt: The Doors Bootlegs (2003)

Legacy: The Absolute Best is a two-disc compilation album by American rock band the Doors. Released in 2003, it includes the uncensored versions of both "Break On Through (To the Other Side)" and "The End". Also included is a previously unreleased studio version of Morrison's epic poetry piece "Celebration of the Lizard," a rehearsal outtake from the band's Waiting for the Sun sessions.

== Critical reception ==
Professional ratings
Review scores
Source	Rating
AllMusic	5/5 stars
The New Rolling Stone Album Guide	5/5 stars
The Encyclopedia of Popular Music	4/5 stars

Legacy: The Absolute Best has received perfect ratings in scales from both The New Rolling Stone Album Guide, and AllMusic. The latter's critic, Stephen Thomas Erlewine, notes in his review:

This [album] winds up giving a thorough overview of the band's peak, whether it's on the familiar hits or on strong album cuts ... There are a couple of omissions ... but there's little question that Legacy is the best Doors compilation yet [as of 2003] assembled.

== Track listing ==
All tracks are written by the Doors (John Densmore, Robby Krieger, Ray Manzarek, Jim Morrison), except where noted. Details are taken from the 2003 U.S. Elektra/Rhino CD with discographical annotation by Gary Peterson, except running times, which are taken from the AllMusic review. Other releases may show different information.

=== Disc one ===
1. "Break On Through (To the Other Side)" – 2:29
2. "Back Door Man" (Willie Dixon, Chester Burnett) – 3:34
3. "Light My Fire" – 7:08
4. "Twentieth Century Fox" – 2:33
5. "The Crystal Ship" – 2:34
6. "Alabama Song (Whisky Bar)" (Bertolt Brecht, Kurt Weill) – 3:19
7. "Soul Kitchen" – 3:35
8. "The End" – 11:46
9. "Love Me Two Times" – 3:16
10. "People Are Strange" – 2:12
11. "When the Music's Over" – 11:02
12. "My Eyes Have Seen You" – 2:29
13. "Moonlight Drive" – 3:04
14. "Strange Days" – 3:09
15. "Hello, I Love You" – 2:16
16. "The Unknown Soldier" – 3:25
17. "Spanish Caravan" – 3:01
18. "Five to One" – 4:27
19. "Not to Touch the Earth" – 3:54

Original releases

- Tracks 1–8 from The Doors (1967)
- Tracks 9–14 from Strange Days (1967)
- Tracks 15–19 from Waiting for the Sun (1968)

=== Disc two ===
1. "Touch Me" (Krieger) – 3:12
2. "Wild Child" (Morrison) – 2:38
3. "Tell All the People" (Krieger) – 3:21
4. "Wishful Sinful" (Krieger) – 2:58
5. "Roadhouse Blues" (Morrison, the Doors) – 4:04
6. "Waiting for the Sun" (Morrison) – 4:00
7. "You Make Me Real" (Morrison) – 2:53
8. "Peace Frog" (Krieger, Morrison) – 2:58
9. "Love Her Madly" – 3:18
10. "L.A. Woman" – 7:51
11. "Riders on the Storm" – 7:10
12. "The WASP (Texas Radio and the Big Beat)" – 4:15
13. "The Changeling" – 4:21
14. "Gloria" (Van Morrison) – 6:18
15. "Celebration of the Lizard" (Morrison) – 17:01

Original releases

- Tracks 1–4 from The Soft Parade (1969)
- Tracks 5–8 from Morrison Hotel (1970)
- Tracks 9–13 from L.A. Woman (1971)
- Track 14 from Alive, She Cried (1983)
- Track 15 previously unreleased (2003)

== Personnel ==
Per liner notes:

The Doors

- Jim Morrison – vocals
- Ray Manzarek – keyboards
- Robby Krieger – guitar
- John Densmore – drums

Technical

- Bruce Botnick – remastering, engineering
- Jac Holzman – production supervisor

== Certifications ==
Region	Certification	Certified units/sales
United States (RIAA)	Gold	500,000^{^}
^{^} Shipments figures based on certification alone.
