= Greatest Hits (The Doors album) =

Greatest hits album by the Doors
- Released: October 1980
- Recorded: 1966–1971
- Genre: Rock
- Length: 52:56
- Label: Elektra
- Producers: Paul A. Rothchild; Bruce Botnick; the Doors

The Doors chronology
An American Prayer (1978)	Greatest Hits (1980)	Alive, She Cried (1983)

Greatest Hits is a compilation album by American rock band the Doors, released in 1980. The album, along with the film Apocalypse Now, released the previous year, created for the band an entirely new audience of the generation that did not grow up with the Doors. The album went on to become one of the highest-selling compilations of all time, with combined CD and vinyl sales of 7,000,000 in the United States alone.

The album was re-released in October 1996 as an enhanced CD with a different track listing and cover art. The songs "The Ghost Song", "The End" and "Love Her Madly" were added, whereas "Not to Touch the Earth" was omitted.

== Critical reception ==
Professional ratings
Review scores
Source	Rating
AllMusic	3.5/5 stars

Critic Andy Kellman of AllMusic, reviewing the 1996 reissue, rated Greatest Hits with three-and-a-half out of five stars, and praised that it compiled "some of the band's most enduring songs", such as "Light My Fire," "Break on Through", "Touch Me", "Hello, I Love You" and "Riders on the Storm". His only complaints were on "Not to Touch the Earth" and "The Ghost Song" as "poor choices" and that it could "have been replaced with any number of more significant songs in the band's catalog".

== Track listing ==
All songs written by all members of the Doors (Jim Morrison, Ray Manzarek, Robby Krieger, John Densmore), except "Light My Fire" which some sources identify Krieger and Morrison to be the lone songwriters. Details are taken from the 1980 Elektra Records release and may differ from other sources.

Side one
No.	Title	Original album	Length
1.	"Hello, I Love You"	Waiting for the Sun (1968)	2:14
2.	"Light My Fire"	The Doors (1967)	7:05
3.	"People Are Strange"	Strange Days (1967)	2:11
4.	"Love Me Two Times"	Strange Days	3:16
5.	"Riders on the Storm"	L.A. Woman (1971)	7:15

Side two
No.	Title	Original album	Length
1.	"Break On Through (To the Other Side)"	The Doors	2:28
2.	"Roadhouse Blues"	Morrison Hotel (1970)	4:04
3.	"Not to Touch the Earth"	Waiting for the Sun	3:55
4.	"Touch Me"	The Soft Parade (1969)	3:11
5.	"L.A. Woman"	L.A. Woman	7:52

1996 CD track listing
No.	Title	Original album	Length
1.	"Hello, I Love You"	Waiting for the Sun (1968)	2:14
2.	"Light My Fire"	The Doors (1967)	7:05
3.	"People Are Strange"	Strange Days (1967)	2:11
4.	"Love Me Two Times"	Strange Days	3:16
5.	"Riders on the Storm"	L.A. Woman (1971)	7:15
6.	"Break On Through (To the Other Side)"	The Doors	2:28
7.	"Roadhouse Blues (live 1970)"	An American Prayer (1978)	6:15
8.	"Touch Me"	The Soft Parade (1969)	3:11
9.	"L.A. Woman"	L.A. Woman	7:52
10.	"Love Her Madly"	L.A. Woman	3:19
11.	"The Ghost Song" (1995 Single Edit)	An American Prayer	4:04
12.	"The End" (1979 edited version from Apocalypse Now)	The Doors	6:28
13.	"Wintertime Love" (Japanese CD only)	Waiting for the Sun	1:54

== Personnel ==
Per album notes as shown at the Back cover:

The Doors

- Jim Morrison – vocals
- Robby Krieger – guitar
- John Densmore – drums
- Ray Manzarek – keyboards

Additional musicians

- Lonnie Mack - bass guitar
- Doug Lubahn – bass guitar
- Jerry Scheff – bass guitar
- Harvey Brooks – bass guitar
- John Sebastian – harmonica
- Curtis Amy – saxophone
- Marc Benno – rhythm guitar

Technical

- Paul A. Rothchild – production, re-mastering
- Bruce Botnick – production (as well as the Doors)
- William Gazecki – re-mastering engineer
- Joel Brodsky – photography
- Ron Coro – original art direction
- Ray and Dorothy Manzarek, Ron Coro, Denise Minobe – album design

== Charts ==
=== Weekly charts ===
Chart (1980)	Peak position
US Billboard 200	17

Chart (2026)	Peak position
Croatian International Albums (HDU)	27
Greek Albums (IFPI)	83
Hungarian Physical Albums (MAHASZ)	11
Hungarian Vinyl Albums (MAHASZ)	3

=== Year-end charts ===
Chart (1981)	Position
US Billboard 200	16

== Certifications ==
Region	Certification	Certified units/sales
Argentina (CAPIF)	Gold	30,000^{^}
Australia (ARIA)	2× Platinum	140,000^{^}
Canada (Music Canada) CD edition	5× Platinum	500,000^{^}
Canada (Music Canada) LP edition	2× Platinum	200,000^{^}
France (SNEP)	Gold	100,000^{*}
United Kingdom (BPI)	Silver	60,000^{*}
United States (RIAA) CD edition	4× Platinum	4,000,000^{‡}
United States (RIAA) LP edition	3× Platinum	3,000,000^{^}
^{*} Sales figures based on certification alone.^{^} Shipments figures based on certification alone.^{‡} Sales+streaming figures based on certification alone.
