= The Doors (soundtrack) =

The Doors: Original Soundtrack Recording

Soundtrack album by the Doors
- Released: March 1991
- Recorded: 1966–1971, 1978
- Genre: Rock
- Length: 72:34
- Label: Elektra
- Producer: Paul A. Rothchild; Bruce Botnick; The Doors

The Doors chronology
Live at the Hollywood Bowl (1987)	The Doors: Original Soundtrack Recording (1991)	In Concert (1991)

Professional ratings
Review scores
Source	Rating
AllMusic	2/5 stars

The Doors: Original Soundtrack Recording is the soundtrack to Oliver Stone's 1991 film The Doors. It contains several studio recordings by the Doors, as well as the Velvet Underground's "Heroin" and the introduction to Carl Orff's Carmina Burana. None of Val Kilmer's performances of the Doors' songs that are featured in the movie are included in the soundtrack.

== Cover ==
The cover for the album is of Jim Morrison as portrayed by Val Kilmer. It is a photo of Kilmer looking straight in the camera's lens. His face is in black and white and his hair has the color of burning flames, it is the same effect created on the movie's posters and advertising material.

The French release of the soundtrack features Jim Morrison walking in a hallway towards the viewer; he's also portrayed by Kilmer, and the photograph was also part of the advertising material especially in France.

== Track listing ==
All songs are performed by The Doors and written by Jim Morrison, Robby Krieger, Ray Manzarek, and John Densmore, except where noted.

The Doors: Original Soundtrack Recording track listing
No.	Title	Writer(s)	Original album	Length
1.	"The Movie"	Jim Morrison	An American Prayer (1978)	1:06
2.	"Riders on the Storm"		L.A. Woman (1971)	7:01
3.	"Love Street"	Morrison	Waiting for the Sun (1968)	2:48
4.	"Break On Through (To the Other Side)"		The Doors (1967)	2:26
5.	"The End"		The Doors	11:42
6.	"Light My Fire"		The Doors	7:06
7.	"Ghost Song"	Morrison	An American Prayer	2:55
8.	"Roadhouse Blues"" (Live)	Morrison	An American Prayer; originally from Morrison Hotel (1970)	5:20
9.	"Heroin" (performed by the Velvet Underground and Nico)	Lou Reed	The Velvet Underground & Nico (1967)	7:08
10.	"Carmina Burana" (Introduction; performed by Atlanta Symphony Orchestra & Chorus)	Carl Orff	Carl Orff: Carmina Burana (1981)	2:32
11.	"Stoned Immaculate"	Morrison	An American Prayer	1:34
12.	"When the Music's Over"		Strange Days (1967)	10:56
13.	"The Severed Garden (Adagio)"	Giazotto/Albinoni	An American Prayer	2:11
14.	"L.A. Woman"	Morrison	L.A. Woman	7:49

== Personnel ==
The Doors:

- Jim Morrison – vocals
- Robby Krieger – guitar
- Ray Manzarek – piano and organ
- John Densmore – drums

Note: Played on all tracks except tracks 9 & 10

- Paul A. Rothchild – producer of all tracks except for tracks 2, 9, 10 & 14
- Bruce Botnick – co-producer of the L.A. Woman tracks; engineer for all tracks except tracks 9 & 10
- Budd Carr – executive producer
- Oliver Stone – album director

The Velvet Underground:

- Lou Reed - lead guitar, lead vocals
- John Cale - electric viola
- Sterling Morrison - rhythm guitar
- Maureen Tucker - percussion

Note: The personnel for track 10

- Jerry Scheff – bass guitar on tracks 2, 7 & 14
- Douglass Lubahn – bass guitar on track 3
- Larry Knechtel (uncredited) – bass guitar on track 6

== Charts ==
Chart performance for The Doors: Original Soundtrack Recording
Chart (1991)	Peak position
Australian Albums (ARIA)	11
Austrian Albums (Ö3 Austria)	4
Dutch Albums (Album Top 100)	36
German Albums (Offizielle Top 100)	6
Hungarian Albums (MAHASZ)	8
New Zealand Albums (RMNZ)	4
Norwegian Albums (VG-lista)	4
Swiss Albums (Schweizer Hitparade)	3

== Certifications ==
Certifications for The Doors: Original Soundtrack Recording
Region	Certification	Certified units/sales
Australia (ARIA)	Gold	35,000^{^}
Brazil (Pro-Música Brasil)	Gold	100,000^{*}
Canada (Music Canada)	Platinum	100,000^{^}
France (SNEP)	Platinum	300,000^{*}
Germany (BVMI)	Gold	250,000^{^}
Spain (PROMUSICAE)	Gold	50,000^{^}
Switzerland (IFPI Switzerland)	Gold	25,000^{^}
United Kingdom (BPI)	Gold	100,000^{^}
United States (RIAA)	Platinum	1,000,000^{^}
^{*} Sales figures based on certification alone.^{^} Shipments figures based on certification alone.
