= In Concert (The Doors album) =

Live album by the Doors
- Released: May 21, 1991
- Recorded: 1968–1970
- Venue: Los Angeles, New York, Boston, Philadelphia, Pittsburgh, Detroit, Copenhagen
- Genre: Rock
- Length: 140:43
- Label: Elektra
- Producer: Paul A. Rothchild

The Doors chronology
The Doors: Original Soundtrack Recording (1991)	In Concert (1991)	The Doors: Box Set (1997)

In Concert is a live compilation album by the American rock band the Doors, released in 1991 by Elektra Records. The songs were recorded at several concerts between 1968 and 1970 in Los Angeles, New York City, Boston, Philadelphia, Pittsburgh, Detroit, and Copenhagen.

In Concert includes tracks previously released on Absolutely Live (1970), Alive, She Cried (1983), and Live at the Hollywood Bowl (1987) plus a recording of "The End".

Professional ratings
Review scores
Source	Rating
AllMusic	3.5/5 stars
MusicHound	3/5
The Rolling Stone Album Guide	3.5/5 stars

== Track listing ==
All songs are written by the Doors (Jim Morrison, Ray Manzarek, Robby Krieger and John Densmore), except where noted. Details are taken from the 1991 Elektra Records album and may differ from other sources.

Disc one
No.	Title	Length
1.	"House Announcer"	2:42
2.	"Who Do You Love?" (Ellas McDaniel)	6:03
3.	"Alabama Song (Whiskey Bar)" (Kurt Weill, Bertolt Brecht)	1:51
4.	"Back Door Man" (Willie Dixon, Chester Burnett)	2:22
5.	"Love Hides"	1:49
6.	"Five to One"	4:35
7.	"Build Me a Woman"	3:33
8.	"When the Music's Over"	14:50
9.	"Universal Mind"	4:55
10.	"Petition the Lord with Prayer"	0:53
11.	"Dead Cats, Dead Rats"	1:53
12.	"Break On Through, #2"	4:42
13.	"The Celebration of the Lizard": 13. "Lions in the Street" – 1:14; 14. "Wake Up!" – 1:24; 15. "A Little Game" – 1:10; 16. "The Hill Dwellers" – 2:40; 17. "Not to Touch the Earth" – 4:14; 18. "Names of the Kingdom" – 1:25; 19. "The Palace of Exile" – 2:21"
20.	"Soul Kitchen"	7:16

- All tracks originally released on Absolutely Live (1970).

Disc two
No.	Title	Original release	Length
1.	"Roadhouse Blues"	An American Prayer (1978)	6:13
2.	"Gloria" (Van Morrison)	Alive, She Cried (1983)	6:18
3.	"Light My Fire" including "Graveyard Poem" (Jim Morrison)	Alive, She Cried	9:51
4.	"You Make Me Real"	Alive, She Cried	3:04
5.	"Texas Radio & The Big Beat"	Alive, She Cried	1:52
6.	"Love Me Two Times"	Alive, She Cried	3:16
7.	"Little Red Rooster" (Dixon)	Alive, She Cried	7:06
8.	"Moonlight Drive" including "Horse Latitudes"	Alive, She Cried	5:33
9.	"Close to You" (Dixon)	Absolutely Live	5:26
10.	"The Unknown Soldier"	Live at the Hollywood Bowl (1987)	4:25
11.	"The End"	Previously unreleased	15:42

== Personnel ==
The Doors

- Jim Morrison – vocals
- Ray Manzarek – organ, keyboard bass, lead vocal ("Close to You")
- Robby Krieger – guitar
- John Densmore – drums

Additional musician

- John Sebastian – harmonica ("Little Red Rooster")

Technical

- Paul A. Rothchild – producer, mastering
- Bruce Botnick – engineer, mixing, mastering
- William J. Gazecki – mixing
- Rick Hart – mixing
- The Doors – mastering; co-producer ("Roadhouse Blues")
- John Haeny – mixing; co-producer ("Roadhouse Blues")
- Joel Brodsky – photography
- Ed Caraeff – photography
- Paul Ferrara – photography
- Nick Egan – art direction
- Tom Bouman – art direction, design

== Charts and certifications ==
1991 album charts
Chart	Peak	Ref(s)
Finnish Albums (Suomen Virallinen)	30	
Billboard 200	50	

Region	Certification	Certified units/sales
Argentina (CAPIF)	Gold	30,000^{^}
Australia (ARIA)	Gold	35,000^{^}
Canada (Music Canada)	Gold	50,000^{^}
France (SNEP)	Gold	100,000^{*}
Italy (FIMI) sales since 2009	Gold	25,000^{‡}
United Kingdom (BPI)	Silver	60,000^{^}
United States (RIAA)	Platinum	1,000,000^{^}
^{*} Sales figures based on certification alone.^{^} Shipments figures based on certification alone.^{‡} Sales+streaming figures based on certification alone.
