= Summer's Almost Gone =

1968 song by the Doors

Song by the Doors

from the album Waiting for the Sun
- Released: July 3, 1968
- Recorded: 1967
- Length: 3:20
- Label: Elektra
- Songwriter: The Doors
- Producer: Paul A. Rothchild

"Summer's Almost Gone" is a song originally written by Jim Morrison and credited to Morrison, Ray Manzarek, John Densmore and Robby Krieger that was released on the Doors' 1968 album Waiting for the Sun.

== Writing and recording ==
"Summer's Almost Gone" was one of the first songs Morrison wrote. It was one of the songs that he played for Manzarek when they met at Venice Beach in July 1965, a meeting that ultimately led to the formation of the Doors. On September 2, 1965, an early version of the Doors, before Krieger joined, recorded the song for a demo at World Pacific Studios in Los Angeles. This version was later released on the 1997 album The Doors: Box Set.

The Doors originally intended to include a lengthy song "Celebration of the Lizard" on Waiting for the Sun, but eventually decided against it. As a result, they needed additional songs to fill out the album, and included two songs from the 1965 demo, "Summer's Almost Gone" and "Hello, I Love You" to help fill the gap. The version ultimately used on the album was initially recorded in 1967 for the band's second album Strange Days but unused at the time.

== Music and lyrics ==
Classic Rock contributor Rob Hughes described the song as "ephemeral", and as a "woozy folk blues with a balmy seasonal air. The song has a 12-bar blues structure. Hughes described the instrumentation as being "happily lopsided, as if time's axis has slipped into a fanciful psychedelic dream" and said that "Morrison sings like he's immersed in a vision." Pop culture writer Tony Thompson felt that the song sounded like "a psychedelic version" of Brian Hyland's 1962 song "Sealed With a Kiss". He described Kreiger's slide guitar as "eerie" and Manzarek's piano chords as "plaintive". Doug Sundling described the playing in the introduction as having a "gentle, grinning guitar", "soft and slightly inebriated piano" and "softly stroked cymbals."

According to Hughes, lyrics such as "Where will we be when the summer's gone" generate a "bittersweet note" reflecting the waning of youthful optimism and suggesting that the future will not be as good. The line "Morning found us calmly unaware," according to Thompson, "captures the lazy mood of summer." Thompson also considered the image of the "laughing sea" appealing and felt that the lyrics overall evoke "the poetic idea of summer as youth."

Manzarek referred to "Summer's Almost Gone" as "a cool Latino-Bolero kind of thing with a Bach-like bridge. It's about the ephemeral nature of life. A season of joy and light and laughter is coming to an end."

== Reception ==
Hughes considered "Summer's Almost Gone" to be one of the Doors' most underrated songs. Music journalist Harvey Kubernik described "Summer's Almost Gone" as being "beautifully melancholy". Rolling Stone critic Jim Miller felt that the song was "evocative" despite "lame" lyrics. Thompson called it a "trippy little sleeper that will grow on the listener with repeated listens." Classic Rock critic Max Bell described it as "wistful". Allmusic critic Richie Unterberger described it as "fine melodic ballad rock." The Doors FAQ author Rich Weidman described "Summer's Almost Gone" and the song that follows it on Waiting for the Sun, Kreiger's "Wintertime Love", as being perfect compliments.

== Live performances ==
"Summer's Almost Gone" was part of the Doors' early live repertoire. After Morrison's death, Manzarek and Kreiger played "Summer's Almost Gone", with Ian Astbury as the lead singer and Stewart Copeland replacing an injured Densmore on drums, at a September 6, 2002 concert at the California Speedway in Fontana, California. This concert was the genesis of the group The Doors of the 21st Century, later renamed Manzarek–Krieger.

== Personnel ==
Details are taken from the 2019 Rhino Records reissue liner notes.

The Doors

- Jim Morrison – vocals
- Ray Manzarek – keyboards
- Robby Krieger – guitar
- John Densmore – drums

Additional musicians

- Douglas Lubahn - electric bass

Technical

- Paul A. Rothchild – production
- Bruce Botnick – engineering
