= Rick & the Ravens =

American surf rock band (1961–1965)

- Origin: Los Angeles, California, United States
- Genres: Surf rock; frat rock
- Years active: 1961–1965
- Labels: Aura; Posae
- Spinoffs: The Doors
- Past members: Patrick Stonier; Roland Biscaluz; Vince Thomas; Ray Manzarek; Jim Morrison; John Densmore; Jim Manzarek; Rick Manzarek

Rick & the Ravens was an American surf rock and frat rock band founded in 1961, known as the forerunner of the Doors. Members Ray Manzarek, John Densmore, and Jim Morrison renamed the group in the latter half of 1965 after joining forces with Robby Krieger.

Rick & the Ravens recorded three singles on Aura Records and a demo acetate containing six songs that were later re-recorded on The Doors' albums.

== History ==
=== Line-ups ===
The band initially consisted of Rick Manzarek on guitar, Jim Manzarek on organ and harmonica, Patrick Stonier on saxophone, Roland Biscaluz on bass, and Vince Thomas on drums. The drummer and bass player were initially not permanent members, but asked to join whenever a gig was upcoming. The name of the band partly stems from guitarist & Manzarek brother Rick.

In 1962, Ray Manzarek, having moved to Los Angeles from Chicago, joined on vocals and occasional piano. The family's name was spelt Manczarek, with an additional letter 'c'; but, Ray alone changed the spelling to "Manzarek" later on upon joining The Doors.

=== Performances ===
The band performed on weekends for college crowds, mostly from UCLA Film School, at a bar called the Turkey Joint West on Santa Monica Boulevard, a British pub operated by the Santa Monica Soccer and Social Club, since 1974 known as Ye Olde King's Head. Their concert setlist consisted of their own original songs, padded with covered versions of blues standards such as "I'm Your Doctor, I Know What You Need" by Muddy Waters, "Louie Louie" by Richard Berry, Barrett Strong's "Money", and Willie Dixon's "Hoochie Coochie Man."

In an interview conducted by Rainer Moddemann, Manzarek stated the first song Jim Morrison performed with Rick & the Ravens was Richard Berry's "Louie Louie". Morrison was not officially part of the band at that time; Manzarek simply invited his former college colleague on stage, much to everyone's surprise. Morrison was reportedly not prepared for this, his first public performance, and sang himself hoarse. Morrison and Manzarek had met previously and found they shared a lot of musical and artistic interests. Later Manzarek asked Morrison to join the band and he accepted.

=== The 1965 World Pacific Demo ===
On September 2, 1965 the band entered World Pacific Studios in Los Angeles and recorded six songs that would eventually become Doors songs: "Moonlight Drive", "My Eyes Have Seen You", "Hello, I Love You", "Go Insane" (known simply as "Insane" on the acetate), "End of the Night", and "Summer's Almost Gone". The recording session was a relatively quick affair, only lasting three hours in total. Singer Morrison was reportedly delighted to hear his voice on a record for the first time. The demo was released in its entirety on The Doors: Box Set in 1997. The tracks on the box set were mastered from Rick Manzarek's original acetate which was one of only five made.

=== Transformation to the Doors ===
The 1965 Rick & the Ravens demo features Jim Morrison on vocals, Ray Manzarek on piano and background vocals, John Densmore on drums, Rick Manzarek on guitar, Jim Manzarek on harmonica, and Patricia "Pat" Hansen (née Sullivan, from Patty and the Esquires, the band she had with Chuck Oakes whom she later married) on bass guitar. The only future Doors member who was not featured on the demo is guitarist Robby Krieger.

Both Jim and Rick Manzarek were disappointed by the response the demo received after attempting to promote it, and they, along with Sullivan, were additionally not impressed with Morrison's songs. Subsequently, Rick and Jim Manzarek quit the band, stating they felt it was "going nowhere fast".

At Morrison's suggestion, the band changed its name to the Doors a month after they had recorded the demo. Robby Krieger joined on guitar in October 1965, having earlier performed with Densmore in the Psychedelic Rangers. The Doors were initially a quintet, but when Manzarek decided to handle the bass duties with the newly introduced Fender Rhodes Piano Bass, Pat Sullivan was dropped from the line-up in December 1965, ultimately ending up with the "classic" Doors line-up of Morrison, Manzarek, Krieger, and Densmore.

All songs from the Rick & the Ravens demo appear, in re-recorded and sometimes amended form, on later Doors releases. "End of the Night" appeared on the Doors' 1967 self-titled debut album, "Moonlight Drive" and "My Eyes Have Seen You" appeared on the band's second album Strange Days, and "Hello, I Love You" and "Summer's Almost Gone" appeared on 1968's Waiting for the Sun, both included as a result of Morrison's struggles with alcoholism and lack of new songs at that time. The verse section of "Go Insane" became part of the "Celebration of the Lizard" suite under the title "A Little Game"; a live version of "Celebration of the Lizard" was released on 1970s Absolutely Live, with a rough studio attempt featuring on 2003's Legacy: The Absolute Best. Rick Manczarek died in 2021, 8 years after Ray in May 2013.

== Former members ==
- Rick Manzarek – guitar (1961–1965) (died 2021)
- Jim Manzarek – organ, harmonica (1961–1965)
- Patrick Stonier – saxophone (1961–1965)
- Roland Biscailuz – bass (1961–1965)
- Vince Thomas – drums (1961–1965)
- Ray Manzarek – piano, vocals (1962–1965) (died 2013)
- Jim Morrison – vocals (1965) (died 1971)
- John Densmore – drums (1965)
- Patty Sullivan – bass (1965)

== Discography ==
Release year	Name	Publisher	Release Number
1965	Soul Train / Geraldine	Aura Records	Aura Records 4511
1965	Henrietta / Just For You	Aura Records	Aura Records 4506
1965	Big Bucket "T" / Rampage	Posae Records	Posae Records 101

The singles were meant as promotional material only. They were never in wide circulation, nor were they even meant to be published outside the promotional circuits. On the "Soul Train / Geraldine" single, the artist is labeled "Ray Daniels feat. Rick & the Ravens", with "Ray Daniels" double billed. The last singles were initially meant as vehicles to promote Ray Manzarek (billed as "Ray Daniels") as lead artist, with the Ravens merely a backing band. Promotional material presented the artist as "Rick & the Ravens featuring the Voice of Ray Daniels". These plans were discarded when Morrison joined the line-up.

=== Mislabels ===
All of these promo tracks have later ended up on various Doors bootlegs, erroneously labelling the tracks as songs by the Doors.

== See also ==
- Outline of the Doors
