= You Make Me Real =

Single by the Doors

from the album Morrison Hotel
- B-side: "Roadhouse Blues"; "Peace Frog"
- Released: March 1970
- Recorded: 1969–1970
- Studio: Elektra Sound Recorders, Los Angeles
- Genre: Hard rock; blues rock; garage blues
- Length: 2:50 (album version)
- Label: Elektra
- Composer: Jim Morrison
- Producer: Paul A. Rothchild

The Doors singles chronology
| "Runnin' Blue" (1969) | "You Make Me Real" (1970) | "Love Her Madly" (1971) |

"You Make Me Real" is a song written by Jim Morrison that was first released on the Doors 1970 album Morrison Hotel. It was also released as the only single from the album, reaching No. 50 on the Billboard Hot 100, but was ultimately surpassed in popularity by its B-side, "Roadhouse Blues". In France the single was issued with "Peace Frog" as the B-side.

== Music and lyrics ==
"You Make Me Real" is one of several hard rock songs on Morrison Hotel. Rock critic David Fricke called it a "three-minute preview of the garage-blues napalm the Doors would take into arenas throughout 1970." Tony Thompson compared it to the "ragged frat rock" of Rick & the Ravens and to the "'keep 'em dancing' rock 'n' roll" of Billy Lee Riley. The song's composition had started in 1966 and the group performed it regularly when they were the house band at the Whisky a Go Go. The track begins with Ray Manzarek's keyboards, followed by Krieger's guitar, before Morrison's vocals begin. Krieger plays a guitar solo in the middle of the song.

Like parts of "Roadhouse Blues" and several other Doors songs, "You Make Me Real" was inspired by Morrison's girlfriend Pamela Courson. The lyrics incorporate sexual innuendo such as the line "So let me slide in your tender sunken sea." In the refrain Morrison sings "You make me real, you make me feel, like lovers feel, you make me throw away mistaken misery, make me free, love, make me free" and the song ends with Morrison loudly exclaiming "Make me free."

== Reception ==
Cash Box described "You Make Me Real" as "a sampling of rowdy rock in the manner of old fashioned material but with an instrumental refinement" and as a "rousing rhythm side with flashy Morrison vocal." Billboard called it "a rousing rocker" on which the Doors "really [let] loose," saying that it is a "perfect discotheque item that's loaded with sales appeal." Record World called it "a rocking one just like old times." Nonetheless, the single release only reached No. 40 on the Cash Box Top 100 and No. 50 on the Billboard Hot 100. In Canada the song reached No. 41.

AllMusic critic Thom Jurek said that the song "underscores the blues-rock motif [of Morrison Hotel], with roiling electric piano, stinging guitar vamps, and Densmore's swaggering shuffle." Chicago Tribune critic Lew Harris said that it represents "the group's contribution to the Rock Revival, if only in basic structure" and particularly praised Manzarek's "Jerry Lee Lewis piano." Robb Baker said in the Chicago Tribune that "You Make Me Real" is free-wheeling, bluesy rock ... where Jim [sic] Densmore's drums fight with Robby Krieger's old time rock and roll guitar until both suddenly stop and Manzarak's piano absolutely tinkles across the room," calling the song "really, really beautiful." The New Rolling Stone Album Guide stated that the strain of Morrison's voice lends grit to the song. Rolling Stone critic Narendra Kusnur considered it among Morrison's most underrated songs, particularly praising his vocal performance. Classic Rock critic Max Bell praised the chord breaks as being "insane".

On the other hand, music journalist Gillian G. Gaar considered "You Make Me Real" to be weaker than its B-side, "Roadhouse Blues". Tony Thompson said that is not one of the Doors' great songs and wonders why it was chosen over "Roadhouse Blues" and other Morrison Hotel tracks to be the lead single from the album.

== Personnel ==
According to Heinz Gerstenmeyer:

The Doors

- Jim Morrison – vocals
- Robby Krieger – guitar
- Ray Manzarek – Wurlitzer piano, tack piano
- John Densmore – drums

Additional musicians

- Ray Neapolitan – bass

== Other releases ==
"You Make Me Real" was included on the Doors' 2003 compilation album Legacy: The Absolute Best. A live version from a 1969 show was included on the Doors' 1983 live album Alive, She Cried. An early version of the song was released on the Doors' live album London Fog 1966. The Guardian critic Dave Simpson called this version "tightly wound" and "thrillingly focused."
