= Waco: The Rules of Engagement =

- Directed by: William Gazecki
- Written by: William Gazecki; Dan Gifford; Michael McNulty
- Starring: Dan Gifford (narration)
- Distributed by: Somford Entertainment
- Release date: September 19, 1997
- Running time: 136 minutes
- Country: United States
- Language: English

Waco: The Rules of Engagement is a 1997 documentary directed by William Gazecki about the 1993 Waco siege, a 51-day standoff beginning with the February 28 Bureau of Alcohol, Tobacco and Firearms assault on the Branch Davidian church and home outside of Waco, Texas, and ending with the April 19 Federal Bureau of Investigation assault on the building. Following the assault, the building caught fire, killing the remaining inhabitants.

== Production ==
The film was spearheaded by gun rights activist turned filmmaker Michael McNulty, who spent twenty-eight months and $400,000 developing the film. Later former CNN business news reporter Dan Gifford and his wife Amy Sommer Gifford came in as co-producers, supplying almost another one million dollars. Director William Gazecki joined McNulty in traveling the country to interview and film participants for the film.

== Summary ==
The resultant film, with Dan Gifford narrating, combined FBI negotiation tapes, Davidian home videos, footage from Congressional hearings on Waco, and extensive interviews with Davidian survivors, representatives of law enforcement, independent investigators, scholars and scientists. The film painted a dark picture of law enforcement actions, accusing FBI agents of shooting into the building at Davidians on April 19.

== Reception and legacy ==
The film was unveiled at the Sundance Film Festival on January 25, 1997.

It won a News & Documentary Emmy Award for Outstanding Investigative Journalism and was nominated for an Academy Award for Best Documentary Feature.

Because of a falling out between Michael McNulty and Dan and Amy Gifford, different cuts of this documentary have been produced. The version available today on video is a 135-minute cut. Michael McNulty would go on to make Waco: A New Revelation released in 1999 and The F.L.I.R. Project released in 2001.

The film was released on DVD by New Yorker Video on December 9, 2003.
