= Alive, She Cried =

Live album by the Doors
- Released: October 1983
- Recorded: 1968–1970
- Venues: Los Angeles, New York City, Detroit, Boston, Copenhagen
- Genre: Rock
- Length: 36:59
- Label: Elektra
- Producer: Paul A. Rothchild

The Doors chronology
Greatest Hits (1980)	Alive, She Cried (1983)	The Doors Classics (1985)

Alive, She Cried is the second official live album by the American rock band the Doors, released in October 1983 by Elektra Records. It is the follow-up to 1970's Absolutely Live, produced by Paul A. Rothchild. The album's title was taken from a line in the song "When the Music's Over".

== Background ==
Following a resurgence in the band's popularity due to the 1979 film, Apocalypse Now featuring "The End", and the 1980 release of the first Doors compilation album in seven years, Greatest Hits, the push was on to release more Doors' music.

The recordings are from various concerts during the period of 1968 to 1970 including shows in Los Angeles, New York, Detroit, Boston and Copenhagen. Songs include "Gloria", originally a hit for Them, and an extended version of the Doors' best known song "Light My Fire". John Sebastian of the Lovin' Spoonful joined the band on stage to play harmonica on Willie Dixon's "Little Red Rooster". The album was discontinued following the 1991 release of In Concert, a double-album which included all of the songs from Alive, She Cried and Absolutely Live, as well as a few other additional live tracks.

== Reception ==
Professional ratings
Review scores
Source	Rating
AllMusic	3/5 stars
Robert Christgau	B−
Rolling Stone	4/5 stars
The Rolling Stone Album Guide	2/5 stars

In a contemporary review for The Village Voice, music critic Robert Christgau wrote that the tapes are "of some quality" and Morrison is effective when he focuses on singing, but the album is marred by moments "when he emits his poetry" and "narcissistic" come-ons.

Rolling Stone's Parke Puterbaugh rated it four out of five stars, explaining that it "brings ... the Doors' impossibly strange and wonderful music, Morrison's drunken loutishness and his stabbingly sober poetics, and the brilliant, vivid sparking of a machine too mercurial to last." He concluded by stating that "'Light My Fire' ... flares upward into an intensifying bolt of passion that crescendos with ... a scream signifying the communal orgasm of a generation and a decade and a band that would flame out and fall silent all too quickly."

In a retrospective review, AllMusic's Bruce Eder said that Alive, She Cried "helped solve [Absolutely Live's] problem [of leaving] more casual fans rather cold, owing to the absence of any of their biggest hits". However, he pointed out that "it also revealed the reason why 'Light My Fire' had not made it onto the prior live album".

== Track listing ==
All songs written by the Doors, except where noted. Songwriters and track lengths are taken from the 1983 Elektra Records album and may differ from other sources.

Side one
No.	Title	Date / venue	Length
1.	"Gloria" (Van Morrison)	7/22/69 Aquarius Theatre rehearsal, Los Angeles	6:17
2.	"Light My Fire"	1/18/70 Felt Forum, New York City; 4/10/70 Boston Arena	9:51
3.	"You Make Me Real"	7/21/69 Aquarius Theatre (2nd. show)	3:06

Side two
No.	Title	Date / venue	Length
1.	"Texas Radio & the Big Beat"	9/18/68 television studio, Copenhagen, Denmark	1:52
2.	"Love Me Two Times"	9/18/68 television studio, Copenhagen	3:17
3.	"Little Red Rooster" (Willie Dixon)	1/17/70 Felt Forum (1st show)	7:05
4.	"Moonlight Drive" (including "Horse Latitudes")	1/18/70 Felt Forum (1st show)	5:34

== Personnel ==
Per liner notes:

The Doors

- Jim Morrison – vocals
- Robby Krieger – guitar
- Ray Manzarek – organ, keyboard bass
- John Densmore – drums

Additional musicians

- John Sebastian – harmonica on "Little Red Rooster"

Technical

- Bill Gazecki – engineer
- Jim Marshall – photo
- Jeff Lancaster – design

== Charts ==
Date	Chart	Position
November 1983	Finnish Albums (Soumen Virallinen)	26
December 1983	Billboard 200	23

== Certifications ==
Region	Certification	Certified units/sales
Canada (Music Canada)	Gold	50,000^{^}
United States (RIAA)	Gold	500,000^{^}
^{^} Shipments figures based on certification alone.
