= Love Street (song) =

Single by the Doors

from the album Waiting for the Sun
- A-side: "Hello, I Love You"
- Released: June 1968
- Genre: Baroque rock
- Length: 2:49
- Label: Elektra
- Songwriter: Jim Morrison
- Producer: Paul A. Rothchild

The Doors singles chronology
"The Unknown Soldier" (1968)	"Love Street" (1968)	"Touch Me" (1968)

"Love Street" is a song by the American rock band the Doors. Released as the second track on their 1968 album Waiting for the Sun, its lyrics were written by lead singer Jim Morrison and as with other songs, it was dedicated to his girlfriend Pamela Courson.

The song marked a departure from the Doors' usual psychedelic style. It is a love ballad with an acoustic instrumentation. Incorporating elements from classical music, it is described by critics as having a baroque pop feel. Lyrically, "Love Street" is generally considered a simple love song to Morrison's companion, Pamela Courson.

"Love Street" was rarely played in live concerts by the group; however, one performance can be found in a concert in Stockholm, Sweden during their 1968 European tour.

== Background ==
The song was originally a poem written by singer Jim Morrison about the street in the Laurel Canyon section of Los Angeles, California, where he lived with his girlfriend Pamela Courson and watched hippies pass by.

The song is noted for Morrison's spoken narration, which occurs in the middle of the composition:

I see you live on Love Street
There's this store where the creatures meet
I wonder what they do in there?
Summer Sunday and a year
I guess I like it fine, so far

The verse end on an ambiguous note (with the line "I guess I like it fine so far"). Morrison refers to the Canyon Country Store across the street from his house. Morrison also wrote the majority of Waiting for the Sun album and much of The Soft Parade at the residence. The house was partially damaged during a spate of arson fires on December 30, 2011; the balcony was destroyed.

== Critical reception ==
Upon release, Morrison reported that he preferred "Love Street" over its A-side, "Hello, I Love You", which he said was surely not "one of our best". "Love Street" has been praised by many critics for its conventional style, with The Guardian ranking it as the 27th greatest Doors song. Rolling Stone critic Narendra Kusnur considered it one of Morrison's 10 most underrated songs, particularly praising his vocal performance. In an AllMusic review, critic Lindsay Planer called it a "spry and melodic ballad", while Crawdaddy music critic Paul Williams described it as "edgy, even visionary music." Some singled out its "baroque pop feel".

Doors' drummer John Densmore described Ray Manzarek's solo during the bridge as "not flashy", but he expressed that it "gets me off every time because the phrasing is so strong, precise, and simultaneously relaxed." Planer also praised Ray Manzarek's keyboard playing as being "intricate and melodic" in the bridges but complains that Robby Krieger's "painfully understated and jazzy" guitar playing sometimes gets buried beneath the drums and keyboards. English musician David Bowie had cited "Love Street" as one of his all-time favorite songs.

In Canada it charted just one week at #88 before it was replaced by "Hello, I Love You".

== Personnel ==
Taken from the liner notes of the Waiting for the Sun deluxe edition

The Doors

- Jim Morrison – vocals
- Ray Manzarek – keyboards
- Robby Krieger – guitar
- John Densmore – drums

Additional musicians

- Douglas Lubahn - electric bass

Technical

- Paul A. Rothchild – production
- Bruce Botnick – engineering

== Charts ==
=== Weekly charts ===
Chart (1968)	Peak position
Canadian RPM Top Singles	88
