= William Gazecki =

American film director (1956–2026)

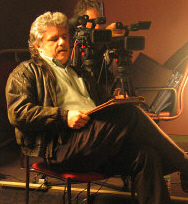
- Gazecki in 2008
- Born: January 14, 1956
- Died: January 11, 2026 (aged 69)
- Occupation: Filmmaker
- Known for: Film director, sound mixer
- Notable work: Waco: The Rules of Engagement

William Gazecki (January 14, 1956 – January 11, 2026) was an American film director and sound mixer best known for his documentary Waco: The Rules of Engagement (1997), which earned a News & Documentary Emmy Award and was nominated for an Academy Award for Best Documentary Feature. The film premiered at the Sundance Film Festival, was awarded the International Documentary Association's Distinguished Documentary Achievement Award, and won awards at both the Melbourne International Film Festival and the Vancouver International Film Festival. Gazecki was nominated another three times for an Emmy award (1986, 1987, 1988), and for an Academy Award in 1998.

== Record production and sound mixing ==
Gazecki started as a recording engineer in the music industry but in 1979, Gazecki along with Paul A. Rothchild produced the song "The Rose" by Bette Midler. The single was certified Gold by the RIAA for over a half million copies sold in the United States. Gazecki went on to Associate Produce with Paul Rothchild (Producer) two record albums by The Doors, "Alive, She Cried" and "The Doors' Greatest Hits Vol. 2", the first going Gold, and the latter going Platinum.

Much of Gazecki's career was in post-production sound mixing for film and television productions including St. Elsewhere (for which he was a co-recipient of an Emmy Award for sound mixing in 1986). Gazecki received awards for sound mixing from both the Cinema Audio Society (CAS) and the Motion Picture Sound Editors society (MPSE), and several gold and platinum albums.

== Director ==
Gazecki directed The Natural Solutions, produced with Susan Stafford for PBS broadcast in 1993 related to FDA attempts to regulate vitamins and health food supplements. In 1997, Waco: The Rules of Engagement premiered at the Sundance Film Festival and was awarded the International Documentary Association's Distinguished Documentary Achievement Award, and won awards at both the Melbourne International Film Festival and the Vancouver International Film Festival as well as an Emmy.

In 2000, he followed Waco with the documentary Reckless Indifference about the murder of Jimmy Farris and the group of American teenagers sentenced to life in prison without parole under the felony murder rule. Gazecki directed 2002's Crop Circles: Quest for Truth.

In 2004, he co-produced campaign advertisements for Aaron Russo's Nevada gubernatorial campaign.

In 2014, Gazecki directed The Outrageous Sophie Tucker, showcased at the New York Jewish Film Festival. The New York Times reviewed it as not "especially well made", yet "because Tucker is such a gloriously rich figure...she renders its formal and aesthetic shortcomings (mostly) irrelevant". The Hollywood Reporter called it a "loving documentary", yet having "its share of missteps".

Gazecki was a member of the Directors Guild of America and the Academy of Motion Picture Arts and Sciences.

== Death ==
Gazecki died on January 11, 2026, at the age of 69.

== Filmography ==
=== As sound mixer ===
Year	Title	Notes
1986	St. Elsewhere	Emmy award for Outstanding Sound Mixing for a Drama Series

=== As director ===
Year	Title	Notes
1997	Waco: The Rules of Engagement	Documentary; News & Documentary Emmy Award for Outstanding Investigative Journalism; Nominated - Academy Award for Best Documentary Feature
2000	Reckless Indifference	Documentary; Golden Satellite Award
2002	Crop Circles: Quest for Truth	Documentary
2004	Invisible Ballots	Documentary
2006	Future by Design	Documentary
2009	Show Me the Way	Documentary
2014	The Outrageous Sophie Tucker	Documentary
