= Not to Touch the Earth =

- Single release in 1980 as B-side of "People Are Strange" from Greatest Hits

Song by the Doors

from the album Waiting for the Sun
- Released: July 3, 1968
- Recorded: February–May 1968
- Genre: Progressive rock; acid rock; avant-rock; art rock
- Length: 3:54
- Label: Elektra
- Songwriter: The Doors
- Producer: Paul A. Rothchild

"Not to Touch the Earth" is a 1968 song by the Doors from their third album Waiting for the Sun. It is part of an extended performance piece called "Celebration of the Lizard" that the band played live multiple times. A 17-minute studio recording of the complete piece was attempted during the sessions for Waiting for the Sun, and the lyrics were printed in their entirety on the gatefold LP sleeve, but only the musical passage "Not to Touch the Earth" was included on the LP.

The full 1968 studio recording of "Celebration of the Lizard" was released in 2003 on the Legacy: The Absolute Best compilation and the 40th Anniversary Edition CD re-issue of Waiting for the Sun.

== Lyrics ==
In the 2020 book Listen to Classic Rock! Exploring a Musical Genre, author Melissa Ursula Dawn Goldsmith compares "Not to Touch the Earth" to "Shaman's Blues" (from the 1969 The Soft Parade), since both songs lyrically seem to indicate that "Morrison was fascinated by shamanism". A portion of the lyrics refer apparently to John F. Kennedy's assassination: "dead president's corpse in the driver's car". Music journalist Greil Marcus on the other hand, elaborates that the line may not be "necessarily about JFK," but "an image floating over the tableau of everyday life."

The song begins with the line, "Not to touch the earth, not to see the sun", these are subchapters of the 60th chapter of The Golden Bough by James Frazer. The chapter is called "Between Heaven and Earth", with subchapter 1, "Not to Touch the Earth", and subchapter 2, "Not to See the Sun". These subchapters detail taboos against certain people (generally royalty or priests) walking upon the ground or having the sun shine directly upon them. Frazer had noted that these superstitions were recurring throughout many primitive cultures, and appeared to be related to traditions and taboos concerning menarche and the following female initiation rites. Frazer's work had an influence on Morrison, according to the Doors biography No One Here Gets Out Alive (1980).

== Personnel ==
Details are taken from the 2019 Rhino Records reissue liner notes.

The Doors

- Jim Morrison – vocals
- Ray Manzarek – keyboards
- Robby Krieger – guitar
- John Densmore – drums

Additional musicians

- Douglas Lubahn - electric bass

Technical

- Paul A. Rothchild – production
- Bruce Botnick – engineering
