= Celebration of the Lizard =

Composition by the Doors

from the album Absolutely Live
- Published: 1970
- Released: 1970 (live version); 2003 (studio version)
- Genre: Psychedelic rock; art rock; proto-prog; spoken word; avant-garde
- Length: 14:28 (live version); 17:01 (studio version)
- Label: Elektra
- Composer: The Doors
- Lyricist: Jim Morrison
- Producer: Paul A. Rothchild

"Celebration of the Lizard" is a performance piece by American rock band the Doors, featuring lyrics written by lead singer Jim Morrison and music by the Doors. Composed as a series of poems, the piece includes both spoken verse and sung lyrics, musical sections, interpretive dance, audience reaction (triggered by performing the piece after telling the audience that they were going to perform "Light My Fire" instead), and passages of allegorical storytelling, though the Doors often performed abridged renditions which omitted some or even most of these elements.

"Celebration of the Lizard" was performed in its entirety at several Doors concerts, with a complete live performance of the piece appearing on the band's 1970 live album Absolutely Live and on the 1991 live compilation album In Concert. A complete studio-recorded version appeared on the compilation album Legacy: The Absolute Best in 2003, and as a bonus track on Rhino's 40th Anniversary edition of Waiting for the Sun (2007).

== Background ==
That piece "Celebration of the Lizard" was kind of an invitation to the dark forces.

— Lead singer Jim Morrison

According to Morrison, "Celebration of the Lizard" was "pieced together on different occasions out of already existing elements rather than having any generative core from which it grew." The first performances of the full work were during late 1967 Doors concerts. Morrison wanted the entire piece to be recorded and released as one full side of the band's third studio album, Waiting for the Sun, in 1968. However, record producer Paul A. Rothchild and the members of the band thought that the extended poetic sections and overall length of the piece made a complete recording impossible. The band did attempt to record the full piece but abandoned the idea, as they were dissatisfied with the results.

The musical passage "Not to Touch the Earth" was recorded separately and released on the Waiting for the Sun album, while the lyrics for the rest of the piece were published inside the gatefold jacket of the original vinyl LP, with the footnote, "Lyrics to a theatre composition by The Doors." In a 1970 interview with Salli Stevenson, Morrison reported that he was pleased with the live version of "Celebration of the Lizard" that appeared on the band's 1970 live album Absolutely Live, although he noted, "I think it's not a great version of that piece, but I'm glad we went ahead and put it out, because I doubt if we would have ever done it on a record otherwise." In the band's later concerts, only the "Wake Up!" section was ever performed.

== Sections ==
According to author Richie Weidman, "Celebration of the Lizard" is divided into seven sections:

1. "Lions in the Street"
2. "Wake Up!"
3. "A Little Game”
4. "The Hill Dwellers"
5. "Not to Touch the Earth"
6. "Names of the Kingdom"
7. "The Palace of Exile"

== Legacy ==
Writing in The Village Voice, Simon Reynolds describes "Celebration of the Lizard" as a "gloriously portentous and pretentious song-cycle". In Melody Maker, he had dubbed it a "17-minute song-cycle of mystico-Freudian tosh that still prickles my flesh as it did when I was an impressionable 16-year-old". David Cavanagh of Uncut calls it "a brutal phantasmagoria", whereas Mitchell Cohen of Fusion describes it as "a bizarre mixture of Marat/Sade theatricality, erotic rock and neo-beat poetics." Noting that the "full libretto" of the piece was printed in the Waiting for the Sun liner notes, New Musical Express writer Max Bell calls it "a diffuse narrative poem based on the beliefs of The Shaman and some of the obliquer fertility rites prevalent in the East." Commenting on live versions, writer Mick Farren recalls how "the long song cycle that takes up a whole side on the Absolutely Live album became a vehicle of increasingly over-the-edge excesses." One section of the piece, in which Morrison ominously sings "Forget your name, go insane", was sampled by rave producer Acen on his darkside single "Close Your Eyes" (1992), in a manner compared to a "helium nursery voice".
