= Roadhouse Blues =

1970 song by the Doors

Single by the Doors

from the album Morrison Hotel
- A-side: "You Make Me Real"
- Released: March 1970
- Recorded: November 4–5, 1969
- Studio: Elektra, Los Angeles
- Genre: Blues rock
- Length: 4:04 (album version); 3:49 (single version)
- Label: Elektra
- Composer: The Doors
- Lyricist: Jim Morrison
- Producer: Paul A. Rothchild

The Doors singles chronology
"Runnin' Blue" (1969)	"Roadhouse Blues" (1970)	"Love Her Madly" (1971)

Audio sample
- file; help

"Roadhouse Blues" is a song by the American rock band the Doors from their 1970 album Morrison Hotel. It was released as the B-side of "You Make Me Real", which peaked at No. 50 on the U.S. Billboard Hot 100 and No. 41 in Canada. "Roadhouse Blues" charted in its own right on the Cash Box Top 100, peaking at No. 76. The song became a concert staple for the group and it has been covered by numerous artists.

Hailed by sound engineer Bruce Botnick as "the all-time American bar band song," "Roadhouse Blues"–despite its relatively unsuccessful chart peak–received strong airplay on rock radio stations. The song's title was considered for the name of the album, but it was eventually changed. It was ranked the 153rd top classic-rock song by Q104.3, and the 12th best rock song of all time by Time Out.

== Recording ==
The song was recorded over two days, from November 4 to 5, 1969. Producer Paul A. Rothchild insisted on several takes, some of which were included on the 2006 reissue. Jim Morrison, who was apparently intoxicated during the sessions, flubbed several lyrics and kept repeating the phrase "Money beats soul every time".

There was more progress on the second day when resident guitarist Lonnie Mack (then employed as an Elektra Records A&R representative) joined in to play bass. Ray Neapolitan, the regular bassist during the Morrison Hotel sessions, was stuck in traffic. Although there has been speculation Mack also contributed the guitar solo, he confirmed he had played bass and nothing else. While Mack had stopped working as a professional musician at the time, he decided to return to his career following the session.

Guitarist Robby Krieger is responsible for all guitar parts on "Roadhouse Blues"; Morrison shouts "do it, Robby, do it!" at the start of the guitar solo. Ray Manzarek switched from a Wurlitzer electric piano to a tack piano. Ex–Lovin' Spoonful frontman John Sebastian contributed harmonica (listed as "G. Puglese" for contractual reasons).

Alice Cooper claimed he was the inspiration for the line "woke up this morning and I got myself a beer", as stated on his Planet Rock morning show: "We were sitting there drinking and Jim comes in and he flops down ... I said that I had got up this morning and got myself a beer and while we're talking he just writes that down. So they go in and they're doing the song and the next thing I hear is 'Woke up this morning and I got myself a beer' and I went 'I just said that a second ago!'"

== Other versions ==
A live version appeared on the album An American Prayer, released several years after Morrison died, and that version can be heard again on In Concert. In this version, Morrison talks for a short while to a female audience member about his Zodiac sign and, with a sudden, ironic twist that causes the audience to erupt in laughter, denounces his belief in it. The song was also featured twice in the movie The Doors; the studio version in the film, and the aforementioned live one over the end credits.

A studio version of the song with John Lee Hooker sharing vocals with Morrison can be found on the 2000 tribute album Stoned Immaculate: The Music of The Doors. A studio rehearsal of the song with Ray Manzarek on lead vocals was recorded on May 6, 1969. This version was finally released on The Soft Parade: 50th Anniversary Edition in 2019. "Roadhouse Blues" was also performed by the surviving members and Eddie Vedder at the Doors' Rock and Roll Hall of Fame induction in 1993.

== Personnel ==
The Doors

- Jim Morrison – vocals
- Robby Krieger – guitar
- Ray Manzarek – tack piano
- John Densmore – drums

Additional musicians

- Lonnie Mack – bass
- John Sebastian – harmonica

== Certifications ==
Region	Certification	Certified units/sales
Italy (FIMI) sales since 2009	Gold	35,000^{‡}
New Zealand (RMNZ)	Platinum	30,000^{‡}
United Kingdom (BPI)	Silver	250,000^{‡}
United States (RIAA)	Platinum	1,000,000^{‡}
^{‡} Sales+streaming figures based on certification alone.

== Charts ==
Chart (1970)	Peak position
Australia (Kent Music Report)	38
Belgium (Ultratop 50 Wallonia)	44
Canada (RPM)	41
US Billboard Hot 100	50
US Cash Box Top 100	76

== Status Quo version ==
"Roadhouse Blues"

Promotional single by Status Quo

from the album Piledriver
- Released: 1972
- Genre: Hard rock
- Length: 7:26
- Label: Vertigo
- Composer: The Doors
- Lyricist: Jim Morrison

Status Quo, while touring in Bielefeld, Germany, in 1970, heard the Doors' recording shortly after it was released. They were looking for a change of direction, away from their original psychedelic pop style, and were unsure about what to do; after hearing the song in a club, they enjoyed its 12-bar shuffle and thought it would be a good template for future original material. The group recorded a studio version on the 1972 album Piledriver, with bassist Alan Lancaster taking the lead vocal and featuring an extra verse with three-part harmonies, which the Doors' recording did not have. The lyrics differed from the original; for instance, "I should have made you" instead of "Ashen lady". The track was released as a promotional single, with Black Sabbath's "Children of the Grave" on the B-side.

The song was a regular feature of Quo's live setlist throughout the 1970s, its performance coming towards the end of the show. It was extended to allow a jam session in the middle, featuring snippets of other songs, including the traditional "The Irish Washerwoman" and "Jarabe Tapatío" (known as the "Mexican hat dance") as well as "Shakin' All Over". A 14-minute version appears as the final track on 1977's Live. In 1992, the live album Live Alive Quo featured "Roadhouse Medley", which blended other songs into the main "Roadhouse Blues" riff and consumed over a third of their entire set at 20:35 in duration.

"Roadhouse Blues" was revived for the "Frantic Four" tours in 2013. In 2014, a deluxe reissue of Piledriver included a 15-minute live version, recorded in 1973.

=== Personnel ===
- Alan Lancaster – lead vocals, bass
- Francis Rossi – lead guitar, backing vocals
- Rick Parfitt – rhythm guitar, backing vocals
- John Coghlan – drums

Additional musicians

- Bob Young – harmonica
- Jimmy Horowitz – piano
