= The End (The Doors song) =

Song by the Doors

Song by the Doors

from the album The Doors
- Released: January 4, 1967
- Recorded: September 16, 1966
- Studio: Sunset Sound, Hollywood, California
- Genre: Psychedelic rock; raga rock; hard rock; spoken word
- Length: 11:41
- Label: Elektra
- Songwriters: Jim Morrison; Ray Manzarek; Robby Krieger; John Densmore
- Producers: The Doors; Paul A. Rothchild

"The End" is an epic song by the American rock band the Doors. Lead singer Jim Morrison initially wrote the lyrics about his breakup with an ex-girlfriend, Mary Werbelow, but it evolved through months of performances at the Whisky a Go Go into a much longer song. The Doors recorded a nearly 12-minute version for their self-titled debut album, which was released on January 4, 1967 and in which it was its closing track.

"The End" was ranked at number 336 on 2010 Rolling Stone magazine's list of The 500 Greatest Songs of All Time. The song's guitar solo was ranked number 93 on Guitar World's "100 Greatest Guitar Solos of All Time".

== Lyrics and recording ==
In a 1969 interview with Jerry Hopkins, Morrison said about the lyrics:

[E]very time I hear that song, it means something else to me. I really don't know what I was trying to say. It just started out as a simple goodbye song ... Probably just to a girl, but I could see how it could be goodbye to a kind of childhood. I really don't know. I think it's sufficiently complex and universal in its imagery that it could be almost anything you want it to be.

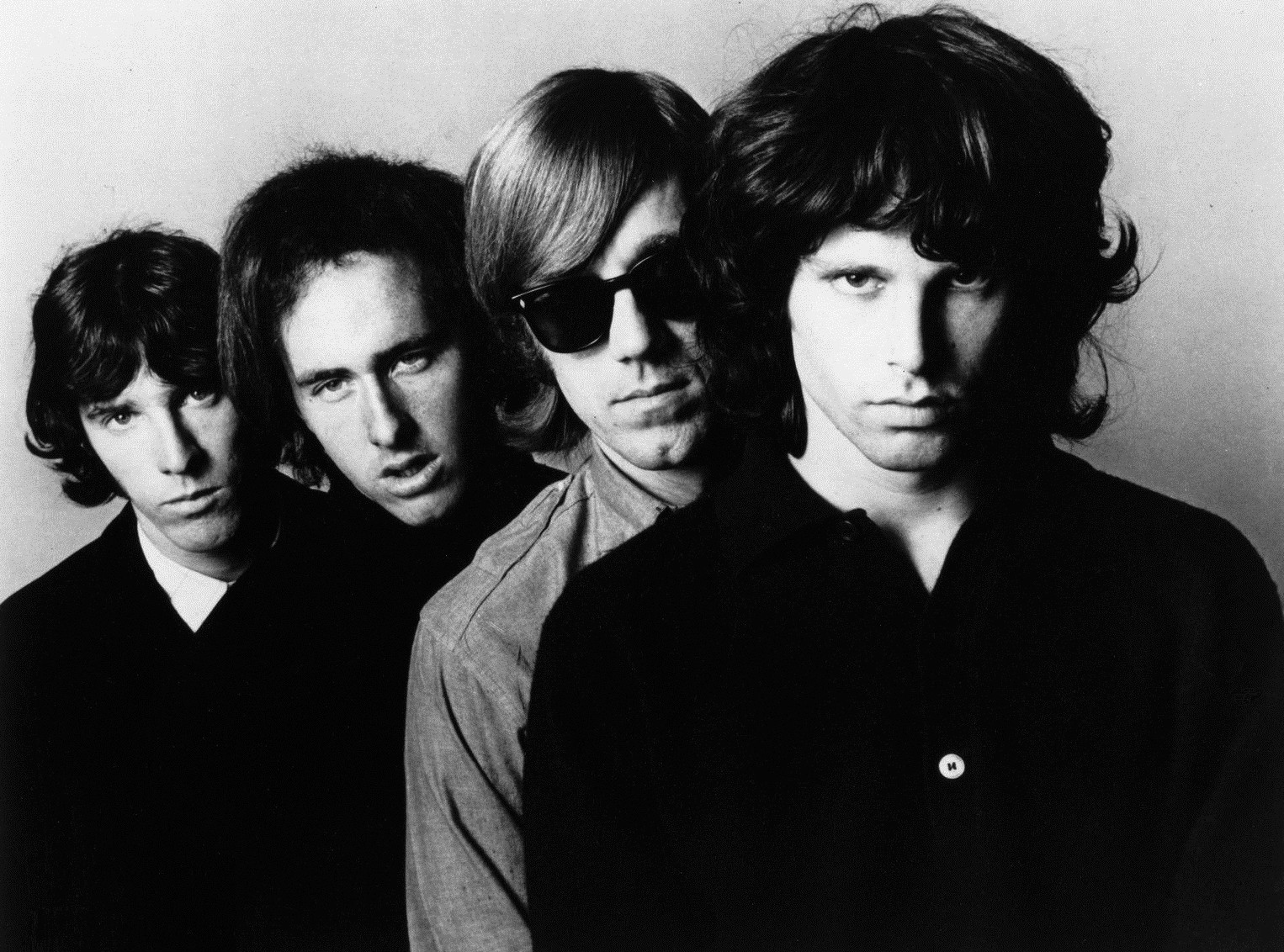
Promotional photo of the Doors in late 1966, a few months after recording "The End" in August

When interviewed by Lizze James, he pointed out the meaning of the verse "My only friend, the End":

Sometimes the pain is too much to examine, or even tolerate ... That doesn't make it evil, though – or necessarily dangerous. But people fear death even more than pain. It's strange that they fear death. Life hurts a lot more than death. At the point of death, the pain is over. Yeah – I guess it is a friend.

Shortly past the midpoint of the nearly 12-minute-long album version, the song enters a spoken word section with the words, "The killer awoke before dawn / he put his boots on". That section of the song reaches a dramatic climax with the lines, "Father / Yes son? / I want to kill you / Mother, I want to ..." (with the next words screamed out unintelligibly). Morrison had worked on a student production of Oedipus Rex at Florida State University. Ray Manzarek, the former keyboard player of the Doors, explained:

He was giving voice in a rock 'n' roll setting to the Oedipus complex, at the time a widely discussed tendency in Freudian psychology. He wasn't saying he wanted to do that to his own mom and dad. He was re-enacting a bit of Greek drama. It was theatre!

When asked whether the lyrics of the Oedipal section actually resonated with his own parents, Morrison defensively replied, "I don't want to talk about it. I don't want to involve anyone unless they want it." On the other hand, Doors' guitarist Robby Krieger believed that Morrison indeed suffered "from an apparent Oedipus complex". However, in John Densmore's autobiography Riders on the Storm, he recalls when Morrison explained the literal meaning of the song:

At one point Jim said to me during the recording session, and he was tearful, and he shouted in the studio, 'Does anybody understand me?' And I said yes, I do, and right then and there we got into a long discussion and Jim just kept saying over and over kill the father, fuck the mother, and essentially boils down to this, kill all those things in yourself which are instilled in you and are not of yourself, they are alien concepts which are not yours, they must die. Fuck the mother is very basic, and it means get back to essence, what is reality, what is, fuck the mother is very basically mother, mother-birth, real, you can touch it, it's nature, it can't lie to you. So what Jim says at the end of the Oedipus section, which is essentially the same thing that the classic says, kill the alien concepts, get back reality, the end of alien concepts, the beginning of personal concepts.

According to Mojo magazine, during the recording sessions, Morrison was obsessed and skeptical of the words, "Fuck the mother, kill the father", as Krieger recalled, "He was on this Oedipus complex trip." Then he accidentally threw a TV, which was brought in by sound engineer Bruce Botnick, at the control room window. After the incident, he was sent home by producer Paul A. Rothchild. However, Morrison, who had taken LSD, returned in the middle of the night, broke into the studio and hosed it with a fire extinguisher. The extinguishing agent marked only the instruments that were mounted in the recording place. Rothchild came back and advised the studio owner to charge the damage to Elektra.

The genesis and the use of the word "fuck" is described by Michael Hicks as follows:

During this period, Morrison brought vocal ideas into the instrumental solo section. Between the organ and guitar solos he approached the microphone and intoned two brief lines from the middle of the song "When the Music's Over": "Persian night, babe / See the light, babe." More strikingly, when the retransition motive began, he held the microphone against his mouth and screamed the word "fuck" repeatedly, in rhythm, for three measures or more (the barking sound that one hears during this passage on most live recordings). This was probably not a spontaneous vulgarism, but rather, a kind of quotation from another Doors song, "The End." Paul Rothchild explains that in the Oedipal section of the studio recording of "The End," Morrison shouted the word "fuck" over and over "as a rhythm instrument, which is what we intended it to be." That "rhythm instrument" was buried in the studio mix of "The End." Now, forcefully superimposed on "Light My Fire", it shocked many a fan who had come to hear the group's most famous song.

The Pop Chronicles documentary reports that critics found the song "Sophoclean and Joycean."

"The End" was recorded live in the studio with no overdubbing. The Doors attempted to record the song on September 15, 1966, during an evening recording session at Sunset Sound Recorders. The next day, two additional takes were recorded, with the second reportedly being used for the album. It was one of the last songs performed by the original group at their last concert on December 12, 1970, at The Warehouse in New Orleans.

== Musical style and composition ==
"The End" has been characterized as a precursor of the gothic rock genre. In a live review published in The Williams Record in October 1967, critic John Stickney described the Doors' music as "gothic rock", which was one of the first uses of the term in print. In 2017, Pitchfork included it on their list of "The Story of Goth in 33 Songs". In his column, Rusty Pipes described the track as one of the early examples of art rock music. Sean Murphy of PopMatters considered it one of the 1967 songs that shaped prog rock. Additionally, in their book Pop Goes the Decade: The Sixties, Aaron Barlow and Martin Kich said the song had influenced most of the acid rock genre.

The track has also been classified as a psychedelic rock and hard rock piece. Em Casalena of American Songwriter credited the track as one of the songs that signified the birth of the former genre, saying "the [musical] talents of the band, coupled with Morrison’s irresistible charisma, turned this extra-long track into a dark, almost sinister anthem that contrasted the hippie-love energy of popular music at the time."

"The End" employs the Mixolydian mode in the key of D, and incorporates aspects from Indian music. Krieger used an open guitar tuning, which he had learned from Ravi Shankar's music lessons at the Kinnara School of Music in Los Angeles, to create a sitar or veena sound; this enhances the raga rock mood. In his book, The Dawn of Indian Music, author Peter Lavezzoli writes that Krieger also developed with his tuning an "Indian jhala style" by rapidly strumming and alternating with the melody line.

== Other versions ==
=== Studio ===
While the 1967 release of the song is the best-known version, there are other, slightly different versions available.

- A significantly shorter edit, sometimes erroneously referred to as a "single version", was released on the CD version of the Greatest Hits album. The edited version is almost half the length of the original.
- The version used in Francis Ford Coppola's film Apocalypse Now is different from the 1967 release, being a remix specifically made for the movie. The remixed version emphasizes the vocal track at the final crescendo, highlighting Morrison's liberal use of scat and expletives. The vocal track can partly be heard in the 1967 release, although the expletives are effectively buried in the mix (and the scat-singing only faintly audible), and Morrison can only be heard clearly at the end of the crescendo with his repeated line of "Kill! Kill!". This version originated with the original master copy from Elektra's tape vaults; when Walter Murch, the film's sound designer, requested copies of the song from Elektra Records for use in the film, the studio unknowingly sent him the original master tracks to use, which explains the different sonic quality of the song used in the film.
- A 5.1 mix was issued with the 2006 box set Perception.
- While it is officially recognized that the 1967 version is an edit consisting of two different takes recorded on two straight days—the splice being right before the line "The killer awoke before dawn", and easily pinpointed by cut cymbals—the full takes, or the edited parts, have yet to surface.

=== Live ===
- March 1967 (13:54), released on Live at the Matrix
- July 5, 1968, Hollywood Bowl (15:42), released on In Concert
- January 17, 1970, New York City, Show 2 (17:46), released on Live in New York
- May 8, 1970, Cobo Arena, Detroit (17:35), released on Live in Detroit
- June 6, 1970, Pacific Coliseum, Vancouver, Canada (17:58), released on Live in Vancouver 1970

==== Unreleased ====
- In the version recorded live in Madison Square Garden on January 17, 1970, the lyric "Woman ... I wanna ... fuck you mama all night long!" can be heard clearly, instead of the unintelligible screaming of the studio version.

== Certifications ==
Region	Certification	Certified units/sales
United States (RIAA)	Gold	500,000^{‡}
^{‡} Sales+streaming figures based on certification alone.

== Personnel ==
- Jim Morrison – vocals
- Ray Manzarek – Vox Continental organ, Fender Rhodes piano bass
- Robby Krieger – guitar
- John Densmore – drums

== Marilyn Manson cover ==
"The End"

Single by Marilyn Manson
- Released: November 22, 2019
- Length: 8:29
- Label: Loma Vista
- Songwriters: Morrison; Manzarek; Krieger; Densmore
- Producer: Shooter Jennings

Marilyn Manson singles chronology
"God's Gonna Cut You Down" (2019)	"The End" (2019)	"We Are Chaos" (2020)

Marilyn Manson recorded a cover of "The End" for use on the soundtrack to the miniseries The Stand. The recording was produced by country musician Shooter Jennings, who also produced Manson's eleventh studio album, We Are Chaos. The song was released for digital download and streaming on November 22, 2019, with a 12-inch picture disc scheduled to be released via Loma Vista Recordings on March 6, 2020. The vinyl would have been limited to 2,000 copies worldwide, and all pre-orders were accompanied by an immediate download of the track. The vinyl artwork consisted of an original watercolor piece painted by the vocalist. A music video based on the single's artwork was created by Zev Deans, which utilized watercolor self-portraits created by Manson.

The vinyl release was canceled, however, and the song and its music video were removed from all download, streaming and video hosting services shortly after release. An interviewer with Guitar World later said the vinyl release was "nixed" by the Doors, with Jennings saying the band claimed the pair were "taking liberties" with its release. The Stand director Josh Boone also confirmed the cover would not appear in the miniseries, saying the recording "ultimately proved too expensive to use. The show was made on a very tight budget and some of the dreams we had went to the wayside."

Manson had previously released a version of the Doors song "Five to One" as a b-side on their 2000 single "Disposable Teens". He later performed "Five to One" – as well as "Love Me Two Times" and "People Are Strange" – alongside Ray Manzarek and Robby Krieger at the 2012 Sunset Strip Music Festival. In 2016, he performed "Not to Touch the Earth" with actor Johnny Depp on the guitar during an event at Amoeba Music.

=== Charts ===
Chart (2019)	Peak position
US Alternative Digital Songs (Billboard)	20
US Hard Rock Digital Songs (Billboard)	9
US Rock Digital Songs (Billboard)	17
