= Waiting for the Sun =

Studio album by the Doors
- Released: July 3, 1968
- Recorded: November 1967 – May 1968
- Studios: Sunset Sound & TTG, Hollywood
- Genres: Psychedelic rock; Psychedelia
- Length: 33:05
- Label: Elektra
- Producer: Paul A. Rothchild

The Doors chronology
Strange Days (1967)	Waiting for the Sun (1968)	The Soft Parade (1969)

Singles from Waiting for the Sun
- 1. "The Unknown Soldier" Released: March 1968; 2. "Hello, I Love You" Released: June 1968

Waiting for the Sun is the third studio album by the American rock band the Doors, released by Elektra Records on July 3, 1968. The album's 11 tracks were recorded between late 1967 and May 1968 mostly at TTG Studios in Los Angeles. It became the band's only number one album, topping the Billboard 200 for four weeks, while also including their second US number one single, "Hello, I Love You". It also became the band's first hit album in the UK, where it reached number 16. The first single released off the record was "The Unknown Soldier", which peaked at number 39 on the Billboard Hot 100.

Having released two records that drew from a large pool of previously composed songs, the Doors began to improvise for their third album in late 1967. Due to the shortage of original material, the group suffered what drummer John Densmore described as the "third album syndrome", struggling to compose sufficient good material to fill the album. The recording sessions also proved difficult for the group due to lead singer Jim Morrison's worsening alcoholism.

The album provoked mixed reactions upon release, with many deriding its diversity and songwriting quality as detriments and inconsistent. However, it has attracted more sympathetic appraisal for its mellower sound and experimentation with other genres. To coincide with the 50th anniversary of the album's release in 2018, a 1-LP/2-CD deluxe version of the album was released by Rhino Records. This was overseen by long-time Doors sound engineer Bruce Botnick.

== Background and recording ==
The Doors started recording Waiting for the Sun in late 1967 at Sunset Sound Studios, (Note: According to music journalist Gillian G. Gaar, the album's recording started in January 1968, but engineer Bruce Botnick confirmed the date as being in late 1967.) with early versions of "The Unknown Soldier" and "Spanish Caravan". The group soon moved to TTG Studios in Hollywood, California, where the majority of the album's recording took place. The band had used up most of frontman Jim Morrison's original songbook, a collection of lyrics and ideas, for their first two records. Consequently, following months of touring, interviews and television appearances, they had little new material. The band attempted to record a lengthy suite titled "Celebration of the Lizard", which was planned to occupy the second side of the album, but the concept was shelved. However, a recording of the "Not to Touch the Earth" segment was included and the full lyrics to "Celebration of the Lizard" were printed inside the album's gatefold sleeve.

The removal of "Celebration of the Lizard" compelled the band to compose new songs in the studio. They also reconsidered older songs they had previously decided against recording, such as "Hello, I Love You". The growing perfectionism of producer Paul A. Rothchild led to innumerable studio re-takes, which became an issue for the group. Morrison's increasing alcohol consumption also caused tension and difficulties, and at one point drummer John Densmore walked out of a session frustrated at Morrison's behavior. Alice Cooper was present during the recording sessions and was reportedly worried about Morrison's health. During the recording of "Five to One", Morrison was heavily intoxicated, to a degree that the studio assistants needed to support him to complete his vocal parts. Each song on the album required at least 20 takes, with "The Unknown Soldier", recorded in two parts, requiring 130 takes.

Two of the album's songs, "Summer's Almost Gone" and "We Could Be So Good Together" are recordings initially made in 1967 for the band's previous album Strange Days, but were not used at the time.

In her 1979 essay "The White Album," Joan Didion described a day at Sunset Sound during the recording of the album. The mood is highly desultory, as Manzarek, Krieger, and Densmore wait for the absent Morrison to arrive to add his vocals.

== Composition ==
Waiting for the Sun includes the band's second chart topper, "Hello, I Love You", one of the last remaining songs from Morrison's 1965 batch of tunes. It had been demoed by the group for Aura Records in 1965 before guitarist Robby Krieger had joined the group, as had "Summer's Almost Gone". In the liner notes to The Doors: Box Set, Krieger denied the allegations that the song's main riff and vocal melody were stolen from Ray Davies, with a similar riff having been featured in the Kinks' "All Day and All of the Night". Instead, he said the song's vibe was taken from Cream's song "Sunshine of Your Love". Densmore said that when recording the song, Krieger had advised him to imitate Ginger Baker's drumming on "Sunshine of Your Love", and he followed that advice. The courts in the UK determined in favor of Davies and any UK-based royalties for the song were paid to him.

Waiting for the Sun contains two songs with military themes: "Five to One" and "The Unknown Soldier". Journalists Nathan Brackett and Christian Hoard speculate that "Five to One" seems to be a revolutionary anthem, spouted by the "hippie/ flower child" hordes Morrison saw in growing numbers. Regardless of this interpretation, Morrison confirmed that the lyrics were not political. Danny Sugarman wrote in his classic biography of the Doors, “No One Here Gets Out Alive,” also a line from “Five to One,” that the title is a reference to the ratio of whites to blacks in the US at that time. The lines "Night is drawing near/ Shadows of the evening/ crawl across the years" may have been lifted by Morrison from the 19th-century hymnal and bedtime rhyme "Now the Day is Over" ("Now the day is over/ Night is drawing nigh/ Shadows of the evening/ Steal across the sky").

"The Unknown Soldier" exemplified the group's cinematic approach to their music. In the beginning, as well as after the middle of the song, the mysterious sounds of the organ are heard, depicting the mystery of the "Unknown Soldier". In the bridge, the Doors produced the sounds of a marching cadence. It begins with military drums, plus the sound of the sergeant counting off in 4 seconds ("HUP, HUP, HUP, 2, 3, 4"), until he shouts "COMPANY! HALT! PRESENT! ARMS!", followed by the sounds of loading rifles and a long military drum roll, a pause and then rifle shots. After this middle section, the verses return, with Morrison, singing in a sadder tone to "make a grave for the Unknown Soldier". The song ends with sounds of crowds cheering and bells tolling. The lyrics are generally viewed as Morrison's reaction to the Vietnam War and the way that conflict was portrayed in American media at the time, with lines such as "Breakfast where the news is read/ Television children fed/ Unborn living, living dead/ Bullets strike the helmet's head" reflecting how news of the war was being presented in the living rooms of ordinary people. The band also shot a promotional film for the single.

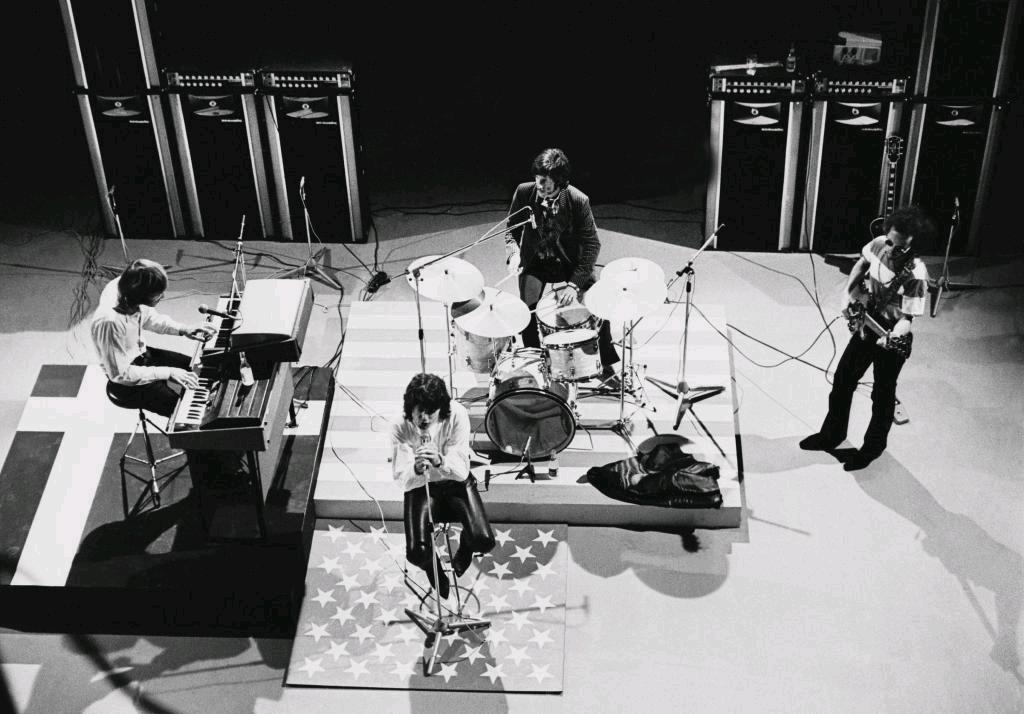
The Doors performing for Danish television in 1968

The centerpiece of the album was supposed to be the lengthy theatrical piece "Celebration of the Lizard", but in the end only the "Not to Touch the Earth" section was used. In a 1969 interview with Jerry Hopkins for Rolling Stone, Morrison said of the epic, "It was pieced together on different occasions out of already existing elements rather than having any generative core from which it grew. I still think there's hope for it." At the conclusion of "Not to Touch the Earth", Morrison utters his iconic personal maxim, "I am the Lizard King/ I can do anything." The opening lines of the song, "Not to touch the earth/ not to see the sun" were taken from the table of contents of The Golden Bough. Krieger's skills with the flamenco guitar can be found on "Spanish Caravan", with Granainas intro and a reworking of the melody from the classical piece Asturias (Leyenda) composed by Isaac Albéniz. The optimistic "We Could Be So Good Together" had been recorded during the sessions for Strange Days, even appearing on an early track listing. A review in Slant Magazine described the song as "categorically pre-fame Morrison," pointing out that the line "The time you wait subtracts from joy" is the kind of hippie idealism the singer had long abandoned. It was issued as the B-side of the single "The Unknown Soldier" which peaked at number 39 on the Billboard Hot 100 chart. The single version quotes the opening theme from Thelonious Monk's "Straight, No Chaser".

The whimsical "Wintertime Love" and the mournful "Summer's Almost Gone" address seasonal themes, while the gentle "Yes, the River Knows" was written by Krieger. In the liner notes to the 1997 Doors retrospective Box Set, Manzarek praises the latter: "The piano and guitar interplay is absolutely beautiful. I don't think Robby and I ever played so sensitively together. It was the closest we ever came to being Bill Evans and Jim Hall." In the same essay, Manzarek refers to "Summer's Almost Gone" as "a cool Latino-Bolero kind of thing with a Bach-like bridge. It's about the ephemeral nature of life. A season of joy and light and laughter is coming to an end." While recording "My Wild Love", the band eventually gave up on the music and turned it into a work song by getting everyone in the studio to clap their hands, stamp their feet and chant in unison. Robby Krieger has cited "My Wild Love" as his least favorite Doors song, recalling that when a bodyguard said to him that his most-liked tune of the band is "My Wild Love", Krieger responded: "Oh shit, man, I hate that song". Morrison wrote "Love Street" for his girlfriend Pamela Courson and like all of his other songs about or dedicated to her, there was a hesitancy or biting refusal at the end ("I guess I like it fine, so far").

== Releases ==
Waiting for the Sun was released on July 3, 1968, although some sources note on the day of 12. As of 2015, the album has sold over 7 million copies since its 1968 original release. Although "Celebration of the Lizard" was not included on the original release of the album, a recording of the long piece was later included along with two early takes of "Not to Touch the Earth" as bonus tracks on the 40th anniversary expanded edition release of the album (subtitled "An Experiment/Work in Progress").

=== Reissues ===
In 1988, Waiting for the Sun was digitally remastered by sound engineer Bruce Botnick and Paul A. Rothchild at Digital Magnetics using the original master tapes. DCC Compact Classics reissued the album on 24kt gold CD in 1993 and on 180g vinyl in 1998, both versions were mastered by Steve Hoffman. It was remastered again in 1999 by Bernie Grundman and Botnick at Bernie Grundman Mastering for The Complete Studio Recordings box set, using 96khz/24bit technology; it was also released as a standalone CD release. In 2006, the album was reissued on a CD/DVD set featuring both stereo and 5.1 remixes created by Botnick for the Perception box set. The 2006 stereo remix was also released on a standalone CD release in 2007 including five bonus tracks, mastered by Botnick at Uniteye. In 2009, it was reissued on 180g vinyl featuring the original mix; this edition was cut by Grundman. Analogue Productions also reissued the album on SACD and double 45 RPM vinyl, both editions were mastered by Doug Sax and Sangwook Nam at the Mastering Lab; the CD layer of the Super Audio CD contains the original stereo mix while the SACD layer contains Botnick's 2006 5.1 surround mix.

In 2018, Rhino Records released a 1-LP/2-CD deluxe edition to commemorate the album's 50th anniversary release, which was remastered by Botnick utilizing the Plangent Process. The CDs are encoded with MQA technology. The LP and first CD feature remastered versions of the same 11 tracks from the original 1968 release. The second CD features 14 previously unreleased tracks. The 50th anniversary edition omits the bonus tracks featured on the 40th anniversary edition and also features rough mixes of all the album's tracks. Botnick recommended some of these versions, saying, "I prefer some of these mixes as they represent all of the elements and additional background vocals and some intangible roughness, all quite attractive and refreshing."

== Critical reception ==
Professional ratings
Review scores
Source	Rating
AllMusic	3.5/5 stars
American Songwriter	(Note: Although American Songwriter critic Hal Horowitz rated the original album four out of five stars, he gave the 2018 reissue only two.)
Classic Rock	4/5 stars
MusicHound Rock	3.5/5
Rolling Stone	(mixed)
The Rolling Stone Album Guide	3.5/5 stars
Slant Magazine	4/5 stars
Virgin Encyclopedia of Popular Music	3/5 stars

Despite its commercial success, Waiting for the Sun was derided by many critics as being pretentious and over-arranged. Journalist Mikal Gilmore noted that one criticism was centered to the "transparent commercial appeal" of the album's opener "Hello, I Love You", with The Rolling Stone Album Guide dismissing it as a "jagged Kinks ripoff on which Morrison comes out like a rapist". (Note: Praising though other songs such as "Five to One", "My Wild Love", "Spanish Caravan", and "Summer's Almost Gone".) Jim Miller of Rolling Stone wrote, "After a year and a half of Jim Morrison's posturing, one might logically hope for some sort of musical growth and if the new record isn't really terrible, it isn't particularly exciting either." On the other hand, Pete Johnson of The Philadelphia Inquirer felt that Waiting for the Sun contains "the smallest amount self-indulgent" songs compared to the Doors' previous albums. The New Musical Express declared "The Unknown Soldier" as the standout of side one and "all on side two are gems, notably 'My Wild Love' and the long finale 'Five to One'."

Retrospective reviews to the album have been generally positive. In his review of the 2007 reissue, Sal Cinquemani of Slant Magazine praised the album, writing that "Despite the fact that Morrison was becoming a self-destructing mess, Krieger, Ray Manzarek and John Densmore were never more lucid – perhaps to compensate. This was a band at its most dexterous, creative and musically diverse." Classic Rock critic Max Bell overviewing the 50th Anniversary Deluxe Edition, gave Waiting for the Sun a rating of four stars out of five, arguing that it is "more observational in tone" than the Doors' previous albums. Richie Unterberger of AllMusic wrote, "The Doors' 1967 albums had raised expectations so high that their third effort was greeted as a major disappointment. With a few exceptions, the material was much mellower and while this yielded some fine melodic ballad rock ... there was no denying that the songwriting was not as impressive as it had been on the first two records." Nevertheless, he concluded that "time's been fairly kind to the record, which is quite enjoyable and diverse, just not as powerful a full-length statement as the group's best albums."

Stereogum ranked it the third best Doors album behind L.A. Woman and The Doors, concluding: "This is the Doors at their strangest, their most exploratory, their most stylistically expansive. Waiting for the Sun has examples of everything the Doors did well, and it has them doing it at, occasionally, their highest level."

== Track listing ==
=== Original album ===
All tracks are written by the Doors (Jim Morrison, Ray Manzarek, Robby Krieger and John Densmore individually). Details are taken from the original 1968 Elektra Records release.

Side one
No.	Title	Length
1.	"Hello, I Love You"	2:22
2.	"Love Street"	3:06
3.	"Not to Touch the Earth"	3:54
4.	"Summer's Almost Gone"	3:20
5.	"Wintertime Love"	1:52
6.	"The Unknown Soldier"	3:10

Side two
No.	Title	Length
1.	"Spanish Caravan"	2:58
2.	"My Wild Love"	2:50
3.	"We Could Be So Good Together"	2:20
4.	"Yes, the River Knows"	2:35
5.	"Five to One"	4:22
Total length:		32:49

=== Reissues ===
40th Anniversary Edition

CD bonus tracks
No.	Title	Writer(s)	Length
12.	"Albinoni's Adagio in G minor"	Remo Giazotto	4:32
13.	"Not to Touch the Earth" (Dialogue)		0:38
14.	"Not to Touch the Earth" (Take 1)		4:05
15.	"Not to Touch the Earth" (Take 2)		4:18
16.	"Celebration of the Lizard" (An Experiment/Work in Progress)		17:09

50th Anniversary Edition second CD bonus tracks

Rough mixes
No.	Title	Length
1.	"Hello, I Love You"	2:23
2.	"Summer's Almost Gone"	3:23
3.	"Yes, the River Knows"	2:38
4.	"Spanish Caravan"	2:57
5.	"Love Street"	3:05
6.	"Wintertime Love"	1:56
7.	"Not to Touch the Earth"	3:57
8.	"Five to One"	4:23
9.	"My Wild Love"	3:00

Live at Falkoner Centeret, Copenhagen 9/17/68
No.	Title	Length
10.	"Texas Radio & the Big Beat"	1:33
11.	"Hello, I Love You"	2:27
12.	"Back Door Man"	2:06
13.	"Five to One"	4:38
14.	"The Unknown Soldier"	4:53

== Personnel ==
Details are taken from the 2019 Rhino Records reissue liner notes with accompanying essay by Bruce Botnick and may differ from other sources.

The Doors

- Jim Morrison – vocals
- Ray Manzarek – keyboards
- Robby Krieger – guitar
- John Densmore – drums

Additional musicians

- Douglas Lubahn – occasional bass, electric bass on "Spanish Caravan"
- Kerry Magness – bass guitar on "The Unknown Soldier"
- Leroy Vinnegar – acoustic bass on "Spanish Caravan"

Technical

- Paul A. Rothchild – production
- Bruce Botnick – engineering
- William S. Harvey – art direction and design
- Paul Ferrara – front cover photograph
- Guy Webster – back cover photography

== Charts ==
Album

Chart (1968–69)	Peak
Canada Top Albums/CDs (RPM)	3
Finnish Albums (Suomen Virallinen)	8
UK Albums (Official Charts)	16
US Billboard 200	1

Chart (2018)	Peak
Belgian Albums (Ultratop Flanders)	166
German Albums (Offizielle Top 100)	20

Singles

Year	Single (A-side / B-side)	Chart	Peak
1968	"The Unknown Soldier" / "We Could Be So Good Together"	Billboard Hot 100	39
1968	"Hello, I Love You" / "Love Street"	Hot 100	1

== Certifications ==
Certifications for Waiting for the Sun
Region	Certification	Certified units/sales
Canada (Music Canada)	Platinum	100,000^{^}
France (SNEP)	2× Gold	200,000^{*}
Germany (BVMI)	Gold	250,000^{^}
United Kingdom (BPI)	Gold	100,000^{^}
United States (RIAA)	Platinum	1,000,000^{^}
^{*} Sales figures based on certification alone.^{^} Shipments figures based on certification alone.

== See also ==
- Outline of the Doors

== Sources ==
- Botnick, Bruce (2007). "Introduction by original Doors engineer-producer". Waiting for the Sun (CD booklet). Rhino Records.
- Brackett, Nathan; Hoard, Christian (January 2008). "The Doors". The New Rolling Stone Album Guide. Simon & Schuster. ISBN 978-1439109397.
- Densmore, John (1991). Riders on the Storm: My Life with Jim Morrison and the Doors. New York: Delta. ISBN 978-0385304474.
- Gaar, Gillian G. (July 8, 2015). The Doors: The Illustrated History. Voyageur Press. ISBN 978-0760346907.
- Gerstenmeyer, Heinz (2001). The Doors – Sounds for Your Soul – Die Musik Der Doors (in German). BoD – Books on Demand. ISBN 978-3-8311-2057-4.
- Gilmore, Mikal (2008). Stories Done: Writings on the 1960s and Its Discontents. New York: Free Press. ISBN 978-0743287456.
- Hopkins, Jerry; Sugerman, Danny (1980). No One Here Gets Out Alive. Grand Central. ISBN 978-0-446-69733-0.
- Luhrssen, David; Larson, Michael (2017). Encyclopedia of Classic Rock. ABC-CLIO. ISBN 978-1440835148.
- Phull, Hardeep (2008). Story Behind the Protest Song: A Reference Guide to the 50 Songs that Changed the 20th Century. ABC-CLIO. ISBN 978-0313341410.
- Schinder, S.; Schwartz, A. (2008). Icons of Rock. ABC-CLIO. ISBN 978-0313338465.
- Taylor, Steve (2006). The A to X of Alternative Music. Bloomsbury Publishing. ISBN 978-0826473967.
- Goldsmith, Melissa Ursula Dawn (2019). Listen to Classic Rock! Exploring a Musical Genre. ABC-CLIO. ISBN 978-1440865787.
- Manzarek, Ray (1998). Light My Fire: My Life With the Doors. New York: Putnam. ISBN 978-0-399-14399-1.
- Wall, Mick (October 30, 2014). Love Becomes a Funeral Pyre. UK: Hachette Books. ISBN 978-1409151258.
- Weidman, Richie (2011). The Doors FAQ: All That's Left to Know About the Kings of Acid Rock. Backbeat Books. ISBN 978-0-446-69733-0.
- Moskowitz, David (2015). The 100 Greatest Bands of All Time: A Guide to the Legends Who Rocked the World. Santa Barbara, California: Greenwood. ISBN 978-1440803390.
