= Break On Through (To the Other Side) =

Single by the Doors

Single by the Doors

from the album The Doors
- B-side: "End of the Night"
- Released: January 1, 1967
- Recorded: September 12, 1966
- Genre: Psychedelic rock; hard rock
- Length: 2:26
- Label: Elektra
- Songwriter: The Doors
- Producer: Paul A. Rothchild

The Doors singles chronology
| "Break On Through (To the Other Side)" (1967) | "Light My Fire" (1967) |

Music video
- "Break On Through (To The Other Side)" on YouTube

"Break On Through (To the Other Side)" is a song by the American rock band the Doors. It is the opening track of their debut album, The Doors (1967). Elektra Records issued the song as the group's first single, which reached number 126 in the United States. Despite the single's failure to impact the record sales charts, the song became a concert staple for the band.

Twenty-four years after its original release, and after it was released as a single from the soundtrack album The Doors, "Break On Through" became a minor hit in the UK, peaking at number 64 in the UK Singles Chart.

== Musical structure and composition ==
"Break On Through" is an uptempo song in 4/4 time employing the Aeolian mode. It begins with a bossa nova drum groove in which a clave pattern is played as a rim click underneath a driving ride cymbal pattern. John Densmore appreciated the new bossa nova craze coming from Brazil at the time, and decided to combine bossa nova and rock elements. The track's musical style features influences from mambo music. The bass line, similar to a typical bass line used in bossa nova, continues almost all of the way through the song.

Robby Krieger has stated that the guitar riff he played was inspired by the one in the Paul Butterfield Blues Band's version of the song "Shake Your Moneymaker" (originally by blues guitarist Elmore James). In his autobiography, Ray Manzarek commented that his keyboard part was inspired by Stan Getz and João Gilberto's bossa nova album Getz/Gilberto. Other sources have been identified as Ray Charles's "What'd I Say" (bassline) and Them's "One Two Brown Eyes". In a review of the latter, Richie Unterberger elaborated:

[Them's "One Two Brown Eyes"] starts off with a bossa nova-like drum pattern very much like the drum beats that kick off the Doors' own first single (released at the beginning of 1967), "Break on Through." The drums are joined by a descending, circular bass pattern that, again, is similar to the bass keyboard riff that anchors "Break on Through" (though the riffs are not identical).

The song originally featured the refrain, "She gets high". But due to the drug connections and related controversy about the word "high", producer Paul A. Rothchild decided to remove the word while mixing the tracks, leaving repeated phrase "She get!" John Densmore noted, "We reluctantly agreed." The band's engineer Bruce Botnick restored the missing "high" with a new mix for the release of the 1999 box set, The Complete Studio Recordings.

The song was recorded in one afternoon session on September 12, 1966 at Sunset Sound Recorders, and mixed sometime the next month in October.

== Critical reception ==
In a song review for AllMusic, critic Lindsay Planer comments that Morrison's lyrics "reveal a literacy that had rarely been incorporated into rock music":

Immediately the lyrics indicate that something is different ... "Break on Through" is structured like a love song. However, Morrison's phraseology cleverly juxtaposes romantic lyrics such as "I found an island in your arms/A country in your eyes" with the almost sinister lines "arms that chain[ed us]/Eyes that lie[d]".

"Break On Through (To the Other Side)" was described by Billboard as an "excitement filled rocker" that represents a "powerful debut." Cash Box said the single is a "driving pulsating track that should see plenty of spins." It has also been widely considered one of the band's greatest songs. In 2021, The Guardian ranked the song number two on their list of the 30 greatest Doors songs, and Louder Sound ranked it number five on their list of the 20 greatest Doors songs. In 2012, the song was selected to be played on Mars during a NASA mission.

== Appearances in media ==
- In the Oliver Stone film, The Doors, the song is performed three times; first in Ray Manzarek's home, then performed live during the band's early days at the London Fog, and later in the film at the infamous Miami concert, immediately after Jim exposes himself to the audience and is parading through the crowd to evade the police. The third and final performance is paired with "Dead Cats, Dead Rats", which was often coupled with the song when the band performed it live.
- The song is heard in the 1994 film Forrest Gump (along with "Hello, I Love You" and "People Are Strange") as Forrest takes up ping pong during his tour in Vietnam. "Love Her Madly" and "Soul Kitchen" are also featured in the movie.
- Appears in the video game Tony Hawk's Underground 2.
- Featured on one of the trailers for Disney/Pixar's film Monsters, Inc.
- Featured in the trailer for the 2008 film 21.
- A remixed version of the song is featured in the video game Burnout Revenge. It was remixed by BT and it is 7:08 long.
- Featured in the 2005 film Jarhead.
- Featured on The Simpsons during a 4th Season episode when Krusty sings during a flashback to 1973.
- The song is used in the music/rhythm game Rock Band 3, with the song being featured in the opening cinematic.
- Performed by artist Travis Meeks in November 2002. He had performed with The Doors on Stoned Immaculate: The Music of the Doors (contributing vocals to "L.A. Woman" and "The End").
- The song was used in a mashup as a runway soundtrack for the 2012 Victoria's Secret Fashion Show.
- In the 2014 horror film Deliver Us from Evil, a women begins singing the song repeatedly after killing her child.

== Personnel ==
- Jim Morrison – vocals
- Ray Manzarek – Vox Continental organ, keyboard bass
- Robby Krieger – guitar
- John Densmore – drums

== Certifications ==
| Region | Certification | Certified units/sales |
|---|---|---|
| Germany (BVMI) | Gold | 250,000^{^} |
| Italy (FIMI) | Gold | 50,000^{‡} |
| New Zealand (RMNZ) | Platinum | 30,000^{‡} |
| Spain (Promusicae) | Gold | 30,000^{‡} |
| United Kingdom (BPI) | Silver | 200,000^{‡} |
| United States (RIAA) | 2× Platinum | 2,000,000^{‡} |
^{^} Shipments figures based on certification alone.^{‡} Sales+streaming figures based on certification alone.
