= The Doors (album) =

Studio album by the Doors
- Released: January 4, 1967
- Recorded: August 29 – September 23, 1966
- Studios: Sunset Sound, Hollywood
- Genres: Psychedelic rock; art rock; psychedelia; acid rock
- Length: 43:34
- Label: Elektra
- Producer: Paul A. Rothchild

The Doors chronology
| The Doors (1967) | Strange Days (1967) |

Singles from The Doors
- 1. "Break On Through (To the Other Side)" Released: January 1, 1967; 2. "Light My Fire" Released: April 24, 1967

The Doors is the debut studio album by the American rock band the Doors, released on January 4, 1967, by Elektra Records. Recorded in August and September 1966 at Sunset Sound Recorders in Hollywood, California, the album was produced by Paul A. Rothchild. It contains the full-length version of the group's breakthrough single "Light My Fire" and concludes with "The End", noted for its improvised Oedipal spoken-word section.

The Doors developed much of the material for their debut during live performances in 1966, particularly at the Whisky a Go Go in Los Angeles. After being dismissed from the venue, they signed with Elektra and began recording sessions. Musically, the album incorporates a wide range of styles, including jazz, blues, classical, pop, and R&B, all anchored in a rock foundation. The Doors has since been recognized as a landmark of psychedelic rock and one of the most influential albums of the 1960s, inspiring numerous subsequent artists and recordings.

The album was a commercial and critical success, establishing the Doors as a leading rock act of their era. Both The Doors and "Light My Fire" have been inducted into the Grammy Hall of Fame. In 2015, the Library of Congress selected The Doors for preservation in the National Recording Registry for being "culturally, historically, or aesthetically significant". As of 2015, the album has sold over 13 million copies worldwide, making it the Doors’ best-selling record.

Widely considered one of the greatest albums in rock history, The Doors has been consistently ranked among the greatest albums of all time by various publications, including the BBC and Rolling Stone. The latter placed it at number 42 on its 2003 and 2012 lists of the "500 Greatest Albums of All Time", and at number 86 in the 2020 update.

== Background ==
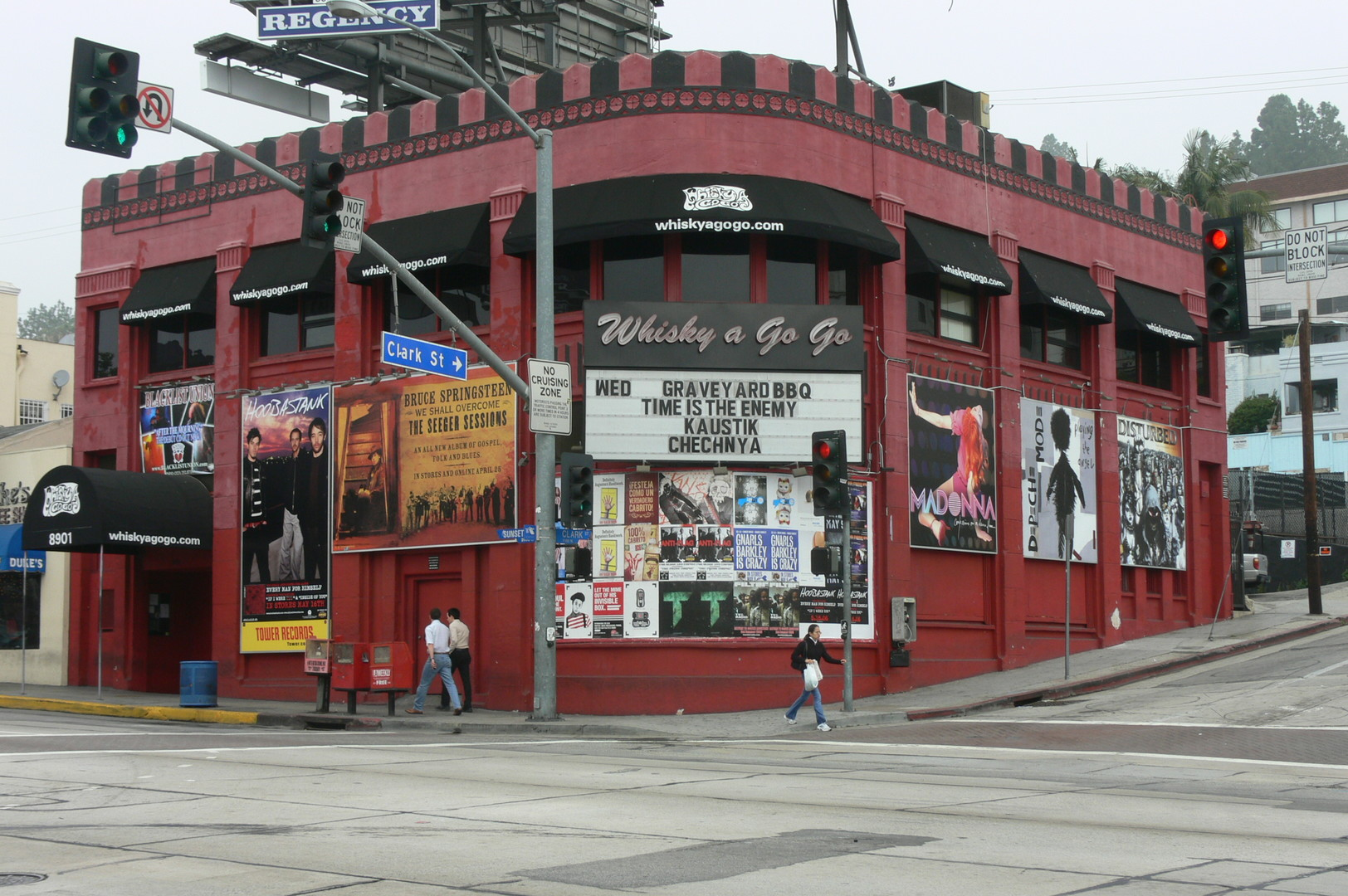
The Whisky a Go Go, where the Doors played frequently in 1966

The Doors' final lineup was formed in mid-1965 after keyboardist Ray Manzarek's two brothers Rick and Jim 'Manczarek' left Rick & the Ravens, whose members included besides Manzarek, jazz-influenced drummer John Densmore and then-novice vocalist Jim Morrison. The group's four-man membership was established when guitarist Robby Krieger agreed to join. Though he had previous experience playing folk and flamenco, Krieger had only been playing the electric guitar for a few months when he was invited to become a member of the band, soon renamed the Doors. They were initially signed to Columbia Records under a six-month contract, but they asked for an early release after the record company failed to secure a producer for the album and placed them on a drop list.

Following their release from the label, the Doors played residencies in mid-1966 at two historic Sunset Strip club venues, the London Fog and Whisky a Go Go. They were spotted at the Whisky a Go Go by Elektra Records president Jac Holzman, who was present at the suggestion of Love singer Arthur Lee. After he saw two sets, Holzman called producer Paul A. Rothchild to see the group. On August 18, after attending several appearances of the band, Holzman and Rothchild ultimately signed them to Elektra Records.

The Doors continued performing at the Whisky until August 21, when they were fired due to their performance of "The End" on which Morrison improvised retelling a section of Oedipus Rex.

== Recording ==
The Doors was recorded by producer Paul A. Rothchild and audio engineer Bruce Botnick at Sunset Sound Studios in Hollywood, California, over about a month between August 29 and September 23, 1966. "Indian Summer" (Note: "Indian Summer" was the first recording session, occurred on August 19, 1966.) and "Moonlight Drive" were the first rehearsal outtakes of the album, while the first recorded songs that appeared on the album were "I Looked at You" and "Take It as It Comes". A four-track tape machine was used at the cost of approximately $10,000. Three of the tracks were utilized as: bass and drums on one, guitar and organ on another, and Morrison's vocals on the third. The fourth track was used for overdubbing.

The album's instrumentation includes keyboards, electric guitar, occasional bass guitar, drums, and marxophone (on "Alabama Song"). Rothchild had forbidden Krieger from using any of his guitar effects (particularly the wah wah pedal) on the record in order to avoid what Rothchild thought was the overuse of these devices. However, the studio was equipped with an echo chamber which gave that specific effect to the sound.

Ray Manzarek, explaining the bass-overdubs, said:

... on some of the songs we brought in an actual bass player, one of the Los Angeles cats, Larry Knechtel, who played the same bass line that I played on "Light My Fire." He doubled my bass line.

According to Botnick, "What you hear on the first album is what they did live. It wasn't just playing the song–it transcended that." Session musician Larry Knechtel and Krieger overdubbed bass guitar on several tracks in order to give some "punch" to the sound of Manzarek's keyboard bass. (Note: Despite their contributions, both Robby Krieger and Larry Knechtel were not credited in the album's liner notes as bass players.) Morrison explained in 1969, "We started almost immediately, and some of the songs took only a few takes. We'd do several takes just to make sure we couldn't do a better one." For "The End" and "Light My Fire", two takes were edited together to achieve the final recording. The album was mixed and completed in October 1966. Although "Indian Summer" was recorded during the sessions and thought was given to including it as the final track, it was eventually replaced with "The End". "Light My Fire" was the last song recorded during these sessions.

== Composition ==
The Doors features many of the group's notable compositions, including "Light My Fire", "Break On Through (To the Other Side)", and "The End". In 1969, Morrison stated:

Every time I hear ["The End"], it means something else to me. It started out as a simple good-bye song ... Probably just to a girl, but I see how it could be a goodbye to a kind of childhood. I really don't know. I think it's sufficiently complex and universal in its imagery that it could be almost anything you want it to be.

Interviewed by Lizze James, he pointed out the meaning of the verse "My only friend, the end":

Sometimes the pain is too much to examine, or even tolerate ... That doesn't make it evil, though – or necessarily dangerous. But people fear death even more than pain. It's strange that they fear death. Life hurts a lot more than death. At the point of death, the pain is over. Yeah – I guess it is a friend.

"Break On Through (To the Other Side)" was released as the group's first single but it was relatively unsuccessful, peaking at No. 104 in Cash Box and No. 126 in Billboard. Elektra Records edited the line "she gets high", knowing a drug reference would discourage airplay (many releases have the original portions of both "Break On Through" and "The End" edited). The song is in 4/4 time and quite fast-paced, starting with Densmore's bossa nova drum groove in which a clave pattern is played as a rim click underneath a driving ride cymbal pattern. Densmore appreciated the new bossa nova craze coming from Brazil, so he decided to use it in the song. Robby Krieger has stated that he took the idea for the guitar riff from Paul Butterfield's version of the song "Shake Your Moneymaker" (originally by blues guitarist Elmore James). Later, a disjointed quirky organ solo is played quite similar to the introduction of Ray Charles' "What'd I Say".

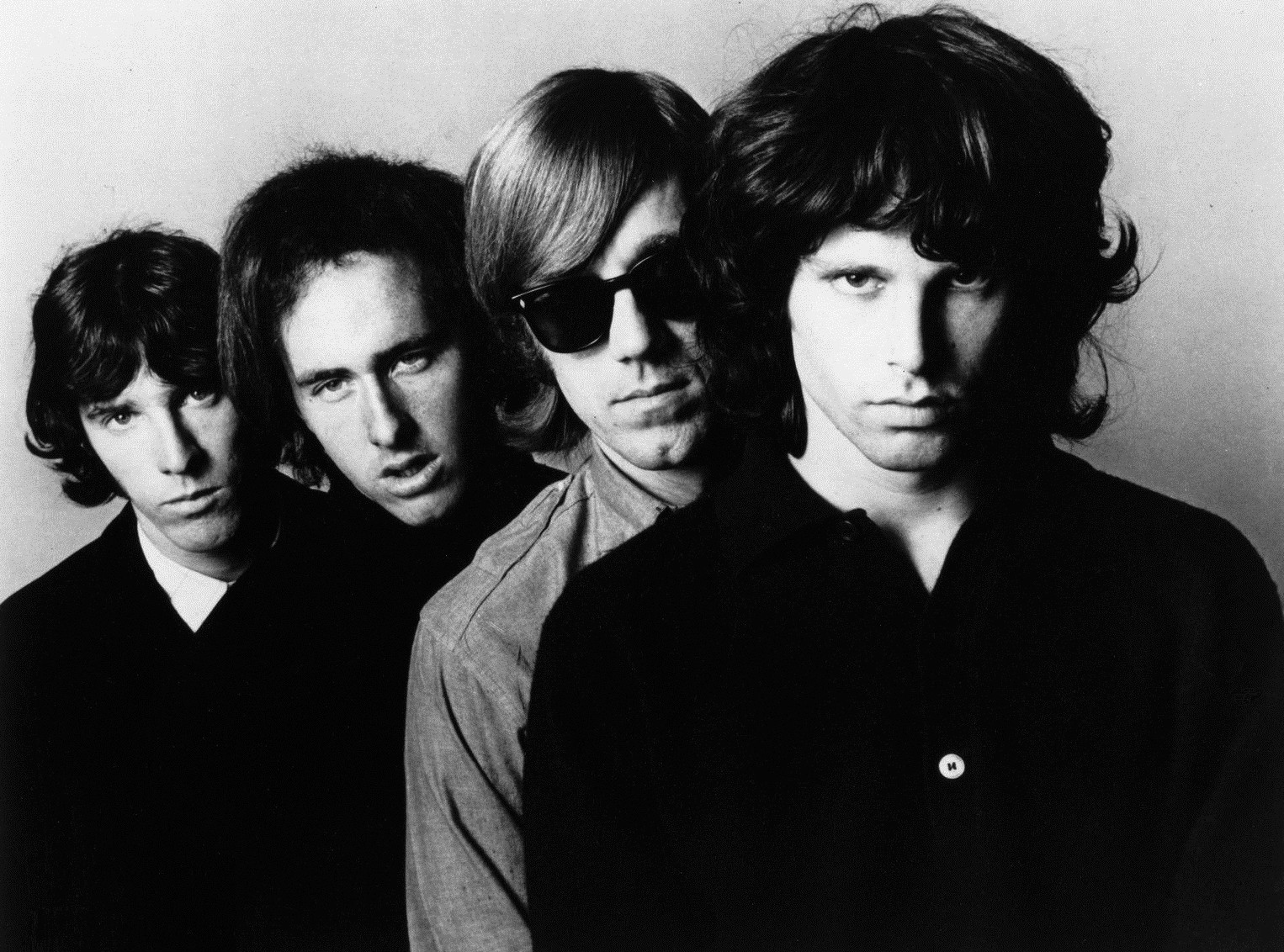
Promotional photo of the Doors in late 1966. From left to right: Densmore, Krieger, Manzarek and Morrison.

The Doors' breakout hit "Light My Fire" was primarily composed by Krieger. Although the album version was just over seven minutes long, it was widely requested for radio play, so a single version was edited to under three minutes with nearly all the instrumental break removed for airplay on AM radio. Krieger has said that it was Morrison who encouraged the others to write songs when they realized they did not have enough original material. He recalled that Morrison had suggested to him to write "about something universal."

Additionally, Morrison wrote "Take It as It Comes", which is thought to be a "tribute to Maharishi Mahesh Yogi". It came from one of his observations on Maharishi's meditation classes, which Morrison wasn't initially studying contrary to the other group members, but was later convinced by them to attend. Manzarek's organ solo on the song was inspired by Johann Sebastian Bach. The lyrics to "Twentieth Century Fox" refer to either Manzarek's wife Dorothy Fujikawa or Morrison's girlfriend Pamela Courson.

The Doors also contains two cover songs: "Alabama Song" and "Back Door Man". "Alabama Song" was written and composed by Bertolt Brecht and Kurt Weill in 1927, for their opera Aufstieg und Fall der Stadt Mahagonny (Rise and Fall of the City of Mahagonny). The melody is changed and the verse beginning "Show me the way to the next little dollar" is omitted. On the album version, Morrison altered the second verse from "Show us the way to the next pretty boy" to "Show me the way to the next little girl", but on the 1967 Live at the Matrix recording, he sings the original "next pretty boy". A notable peculiarity of the band's version is the unusual use of the marxophone. The Chicago blues "Back Door Man" was written by Willie Dixon and originally recorded by Howlin' Wolf.

== Releases ==
The Doors was released on January 4, 1967, by Elektra Records. Jac Holzman originally intended to release the record in November 1966, but after a negotiation with the band, he decided to postpone the release to the new year, as he felt it was the appropriate time for better album sales. For the album's cover, Joel Brodsky was hired to provide a photo of the group, which later received a Grammy nomination. Holzman also suggested an association with Billboard magazine for the album's advertisement by promoting the record with "hoarding", a novel concept which was made popular later on. It was promoted with the slogan "Break On Through With An Electrifying Album". The Doors were the first rock band to use this advertising medium.

The Doors made a steady climb up the Billboard 200, ultimately becoming a huge success in the US once the edited single version of "Light My Fire" scaled the charts to become No. 1, with the album peaking at No. 2 on the chart in September 1967 (kept off the top spot by the Beatles' Sgt. Pepper's Lonely Hearts Club Band) and going on to achieve multi-platinum status. In Europe the band would have to wait slightly longer for similar recognition, with "Light My Fire" originally stalling at No. 49 in the UK singles chart and the album failing to chart at all; however, in 1991, buoyed by the high-profile Oliver Stone film The Doors, a reissue of "Light My Fire" reached No. 7 in the singles chart, and the album reached No. 43.

The mono LP was withdrawn not long after its original release and remained unavailable until 2009, when it was reissued as a limited edition 180 gram audiophile LP by Rhino Records. The 40th anniversary mix of the debut album presents a stereo version of "Light My Fire" in speed-corrected form for the first time. Previously, only the original 45 RPM singles ("Light My Fire" and "Break On Through") were produced at the correct speed.

=== Reissues ===
Professional ratings
50th Anniversary Deluxe Edition
Review scores
| Source | Rating |
|---|---|
| American Songwriter | 5/5 stars |
| Classic Rock | 4.5/5 stars |
| The Independent | 5/5 stars |
| Record Collector | 5/5 stars |
| Rolling Stone Germany | 4.5/5 stars |

The Doors has been reissued several times since the 1980s. In 1981, Mobile Fidelity Sound Lab released a half speed mastered version of the album on vinyl, cut by Stan Ricker with the Ortofon Cutting System. In 1988, it was digitally remastered by Bruce Botnick and Paul A. Rothchild at Digital Magnetics, using the original master tapes. In 1992, DCC Compact Classics reissued the album on 24kt gold CD and 180g vinyl; the gold CD was remastered by Steve Hoffman while the vinyl was cut by Kevin Gray and Hoffman at Future Disc. It was remastered again in 1999 for The Complete Studio Recordings box set by Bernie Grundman and Botnick at Bernie Grundman Mastering using 96khz/24bit technology; it was also released as a standalone CD release. In 2006, the record was released in multichannel DVD-Audio as part of the Perception box set. The next year, a 40th anniversary edition was released featuring the 2006 stereo remix and three bonus tracks, which was mastered by Botnick at Uniteye. In 2009, the original mono mix was released on 180g vinyl, cut by Grundman.

On September 14, 2011, The Doors was released on hybrid stereo-multichannel Super Audio CD by Warner Japan in their Warner Premium Sound series. Analogue Productions reissued the album on hybrid SACD and double 45 RPM vinyl, both editions were mastered by Doug Sax and Sangwook Nam at The Mastering Lab; the CD layer of the Super Audio CD contains the original stereo mix while the SACD layer contains Botnick's 2006 5.1 surround mix. In 2017, a deluxe edition was released in commemoration of the album's 50th anniversary, and includes the original stereo and mono mixes, as well as a compilation of songs recorded live at The Matrix in San Francisco on March 7, 1967. This edition was remastered by Botnick from "recently discovered original master tapes".

== Reception and legacy ==
=== Early reception ===
In a contemporary review for Crawdaddy! magazine, founder and critic Paul Williams hailed The Doors as "an album of magnitude" and described the band as creators of "modern music", with which "contemporary 'jazz' and 'classical' composers must try to measure up". Williams added: "The birth of the group is in this album, and it's as good as anything in rock. The awesome fact about the Doors is that they will improve." Record Mirror wrote: "[The Doors] for Elektra is wild, rough and although it's subtle in places, the overall sound is torrid. They're blues-based and get quite an effective sound." The Beatles had reportedly bought ten copies of the album, and Paul McCartney cited the Doors as an influence on the Beatles' 1967 album Sgt. Pepper's Lonely Hearts Club Band. (Note: Paul McCartney didn't refer specifically to the Doors' self-titled debut album, but only The Doors was officially released during the period of Sgt. Pepper's Lonely Hearts Club Band's making.)

Robert Christgau was less enthusiastic in his column for Esquire, recommending the album but with reservations: he approved of Manzarek's organ playing and Morrison's "flexible though sometimes faint" singing while highlighting the presence of a "great original hard rock" in "Break on Through" and clever songs such as "Twentieth Century Fox" but was critical of more "esoteric" material such as the "long, obscure dirge" "The End". He also found Morrison's lyrics often self-indulgent, particularly lines like "our love becomes a funeral pyre", which he said spoiled "Light My Fire" and "the nebulousness that passes for depth among so many lovers of rock poetry" on "The End".

=== Retrospective reception ===
Professional ratings
Retrospective reviews
Review scores
| Source | Rating |
|---|---|
| AllMusic | 5/5 stars |
| The Encyclopedia of Popular Music | 5/5 stars |
| The Great Rock Discography | 9/10 |
| MusicHound Rock | 4/5 stars |
| Music Story | 5/5 stars |
| Rolling Stone | 5/5 stars |
| The Rolling Stone Album Guide | (Note: The Rolling Stone Record Guide (1979, 1st ed.).) (Note: The New Rolling Stone Record Guide (1983, 2nd ed.).) (Note: The Rolling Stone Album Guide (1992, 3rd ed.) and (The New) Rolling Stone Album Guide (2004, 4th ed.).) |
| Slant Magazine | 4/5 stars |
| Tom Hull – on the Web | A− |
| The Village Voice | B− |

The Doors has since been ranked by critics as one of the greatest albums of all time. In 1985, Sounds magazine ranked it the ninth greatest album of all time. In 1993, New Musical Express writers cited The Doors the 25th greatest album of all time, while in 1998, it was named the 70th in a "Music of the Millennium" poll conducted in the UK by HMV, Channel 4, The Guardian and Classic FM. In 2003, Parke Puterbaugh of Rolling Stone called the record "the L.A. foursome's most successful marriage of rock poetics with classically tempered hard rock – a stoned, immaculate classic." Sean Egan of BBC Music opines, "The eponymous debut of the Doors took popular music into areas previously thought impossible: the incitement to expand one's consciousness of opener 'Break on Through' was just the beginning of its incendiary agenda." AllMusic critic Richie Unterberger lauded The Doors as a "tremendous debut album" and "one of the best first-time outings in rock history", whose "nonstop melodicism and dynamic tension would never be equaled by the group again, let alone bettered."

The Doors has been often cited as the group's finest record. In 2000, the album was voted number 46 in Colin Larkin's All Time Top 1000 Albums. The Doors was ranked No. 42 on Rolling Stone's list of "The 500 Greatest Albums of All Time". When the list was revised in 2020, the album was repositioned at No. 86. Two of the album's songs, "Light My Fire" and "The End", also appeared on Rolling Stone's 2004 list "The 500 Greatest Songs of All Time". Q magazine readers ranked the album at No. 75 on its list of the "100 Greatest Albums Ever", while NME magazine at No. 226 on their respective list "500 Greatest Albums of All Time". In 2007, Rolling Stone included it on their list of The 40 Essential Albums of 1967. More recently, online media magazine Loudwire considers The Doors one of the "25 Legendary Rock Albums With No Weak Songs". Ultimate Classic Rock cited it as the fourth-top psychedelic rock album of all time.

== Track listing ==
=== Original album ===
All tracks are written by the Doors (Jim Morrison, Ray Manzarek, Robby Krieger and John Densmore) except where noted. Details are taken from the 1967 U.S. Elektra release while other releases may show different information.

Side one
| No. | Title | Writer(s) | Length |
|---|---|---|---|
| 1. | "Break On Through (To the Other Side)" | | 2:25 |
| 2. | "Soul Kitchen" | | 3:30 |
| 3. | "The Crystal Ship" | | 2:30 |
| 4. | "Twentieth Century Fox" | | 2:30 |
| 5. | "Alabama Song (Whisky Bar)" | Bertolt Brecht; Kurt Weill | 3:15 |
| 6. | "Light My Fire" | | 7:06 |
| Total length: | | | 21:16 |

Side two
| No. | Title | Writer(s) | Length |
|---|---|---|---|
| 1. | "Back Door Man" | Willie Dixon | 3:30 |
| 2. | "I Looked at You" | | 2:18 |
| 3. | "End of the Night" | | 2:49 |
| 4. | "Take It as It Comes" | | 2:13 |
| 5. | "The End" | | 11:35 |
| Total length: | | | 22:25 43:34 |

=== Reissues ===
40th Anniversary Edition Bonus Tracks
| No. | Title | Length |
|---|---|---|
| 12. | "Moonlight Drive" (August '66 version 1) | 2:43 |
| 13. | "Moonlight Drive" (August '66 version 2) | 2:31 |
| 14. | "Indian Summer" (8/19/66 vocal) | 2:37 |

50th Anniversary Edition Second CD/Fourth LP: Original Mono Album Mix
| No. | Title | Length |
|---|---|---|
| 1. | "Break On Through (To the Other Side)" | 2:29 |
| 2. | "Soul Kitchen" | 3:35 |
| 3. | "The Crystal Ship" | 2:34 |
| 4. | "Twentieth Century Fox" | 2:33 |
| 5. | "Alabama Song (Whisky Bar)" | 3:21 |
| 6. | "Light My Fire" | 7:01 |
| 7. | "Back Door Man" | 3:35 |
| 8. | "I Looked at You" | 2:24 |
| 9. | "End of the Night" | 2:54 |
| 10. | "Take It as It Comes" | 2:18 |
| 11. | "The End" | 11:46 |

50th Anniversary Edition Third CD: Live at the Matrix 3/7/67
| No. | Title | Length |
|---|---|---|
| 1. | "Break On Through (To the Other Side)" | 3:35 |
| 2. | "Soul Kitchen" | 4:05 |
| 3. | "The Crystal Ship" | 3:07 |
| 4. | "Twentieth Century Fox" | 2:54 |
| 5. | "Alabama Song (Whisky Bar)" | 4:03 |
| 6. | "Light My Fire" | 8:52 |
| 7. | "Back Door Man" | 5:44 |
| 8. | "The End" | 14:14 |

== Personnel ==
Personnel adapted from the 50th Anniversary edition album liner notes:

The Doors

- Jim Morrison – vocals
- Ray Manzarek – organ, piano, keyboard bass; backing vocals and marxophone on "Alabama Song (Whisky Bar)"
- Robby Krieger – guitar; bass guitar on "Soul Kitchen" (Note: Engineer Bruce Botnick has claimed that the song's bass guitar was provided by session musician Larry Knechtel, but Krieger argues that he played the bass part.) and "Back Door Man"; backing vocals on "Alabama Song (Whisky Bar)"
- John Densmore – drums, backing vocals on "Alabama Song (Whisky Bar)"

Additional musicians

- Larry Knechtel – bass guitar on "Soul Kitchen" (Note: Engineer Bruce Botnick has claimed that the song's bass guitar was provided by session musician Larry Knechtel, but Krieger argues that he played the bass part.), "Twentieth Century Fox", "Light My Fire", "I Looked at You" and "Take It as It Comes"

Production

- Paul A. Rothchild – production; backing vocals on "Alabama Song (Whisky Bar)" (Note: Bruce Botnick stated on the documentary Classic Albums: The Doors, while hearing the song's final verse: "It's possible that Paul Rothchild was singing in there too.")
- Bruce Botnick – engineering
- Joel Brodsky – back cover photography
- Guy Webster – front cover photography
- William S. Harvey – art direction and design

== Charts ==
Album

| Chart (1967–69) | Peak |
|---|---|
| Canada Top Albums/CDs (RPM) | 15 |
| US Billboard 200 | 2 |
| Chart (2021) | Peak |
| Portuguese Albums (AFP) | 4 |

Singles

| Year | Single (A-side / B-side) | Chart | Position |
|---|---|---|---|
| 1967 | "Break On Through (To the Other Side)" / "End of the Night" | Billboard Hot 100 | 126 (Note: Although some sources incorrectly state this record peaked at 106, the actual chart published in Billboard verifies the position was 126.) |
| 1967 | "Light My Fire" / "The Crystal Ship" | Hot 100 | 1 |

== Certifications ==
| Region | Certification | Certified units/sales |
|---|---|---|
| Argentina (CAPIF) | Platinum | 60,000^{^} |
| Austria (IFPI Austria) | Platinum | 50,000^{*} |
| Canada (Music Canada) | 4× Platinum | 400,000^{^} |
| France (SNEP) | 3× Platinum | 900,000^{*} |
| Germany (BVMI) | Platinum | 500,000^{^} |
| Italy (FIMI) sales since 2009 | Platinum | 50,000^{‡} |
| Spain (Promusicae) | Gold | 50,000^{^} |
| Sweden (GLF) | Gold | 50,000^{^} |
| Switzerland (IFPI Switzerland) | Platinum | 50,000^{^} |
| United Kingdom (BPI) | 2× Platinum | 600,000^{^} |
| United States (RIAA) | 5× Platinum | 5,000,000^{‡} |
^{*} Sales figures based on certification alone.^{^} Shipments figures based on certification alone.^{‡} Sales+streaming figures based on certification alone.

== See also ==
- Outline of the Doors

== Sources ==
- Cherry, Jim (March 25, 2013). The Doors Examined. Bennion/Kearny. ISBN 978-1909125124.
- Davis, Stephen (2004). Jim Morrison: Life, Death, Legend. Penguin Books. ISBN 1-59240-064-7.
- Densmore, John (1990). Riders on the Storm: My Life with Jim Morrison and the Doors. Delacorte Press. ISBN 978-0-385-30033-9.
- Dixon, Willie; Snowden, Don (1989). I Am the Blues. Boston, Massachusetts: Da Capo Press. ISBN 0-306-80415-8.
- The Doors (2008). Classic Albums: The Doors (DVD). Eagle Rock Entertainment. & The Doors (2008). Classic Albums: The Doors Extras (DVD). Eagle Rock Entertainment.
- Fong-Torres, Ben; The Doors (2006). The Doors. Hyperion. ISBN 1-4013-0303-X.
- Fong-Torres, Ben (2007). The Doors (CD booklet). The Doors. Rhino Records. R2-101184.
- Gaar, Gillian G. (2015). The Doors: The Illustrated History. Voyageur Press. ISBN 978-1627887052.
- Gerstenmeyer, Heinz (2001). The Doors – Sounds for Your Soul – Die Musik Der Doors (in German). ISBN 978-3-8311-2057-4.
- Greene, Doyle (2016). Rock, Counterculture and the Avant-Garde, 1966–1970: How the Beatles, Frank Zappa and the Velvet Underground Defined an Era. Jefferson, New York City: McFarland. ISBN 978-1-4766-6214-5.
- Krieger, Robby (2021). Set the Night on Fire: Living, Dying, and Playing Guitar with the Doors. Ebook. ISBN 978-0316243544.
- Lenhoff, Alan; Robertson, David (2019). Classic Keys: Keyboard Sounds that Launched Rock Music. University of North Texas Press. ISBN 978-1-57441-776-0.
- Manzarek, Ray (1998). Light My Fire: My Life With the Doors. New York: Putnam. ISBN 978-0-399-14399-1.
- Moskowitz, David (2015). The 100 Greatest Bands of All Time: A Guide to the Legends Who Rocked the World. Santa Barbara, California: Greenwood. ISBN 978-1440803390.
- Goldsmith, Melissa Ursula Dawn (2019). Listen to Classic Rock! Exploring a Musical Genre. ABC-CLIO. ISBN 978-1440865787.
- Wall, Mick (October 30, 2014). Love Becomes a Funeral Pyre. UK: Hachette. ISBN 978-1409151258.
- Weidman, Richie (October 1, 2011). The Doors FAQ: All That's Left to Know About the Kings of Acid Rock. Rowman & Littlefield. ISBN 978-1-61713-017-5.
- Weiss, Jeff (2021). The Doors (Liner Notes). The Doors. Elektra Records. RCV1-653797.
