= Hello, I Love You =

Single by the Doors

from the album Waiting for the Sun
- B-side: "Love Street"
- Released: June 11, 1968 by Nipper Music Co., Inc.
- Recorded: February–May 1968
- Genre: Rock; pop; pop rock
- Length: 2:13
- Label: Elektra
- Songwriter: The Doors
- Producer: Paul A. Rothchild

The Doors singles chronology
"The Unknown Soldier" (1968)	"Hello, I Love You" (1968)	"Touch Me" (1968)

Official lyric video
- "Hello, I Love You" on YouTube

"Hello, I Love You" is a song recorded by American rock band the Doors for their 1968 album Waiting for the Sun. Elektra Records released it as a single that same year, which topped the charts in the U.S. and Canada. Although the Doors are credited as the songwriters, songs by other artists have been identified as likely sources.

Apart from the single's success, a portion of the band's fans have dismissed the tune, arguing that it does not represent the Doors sound, due to its commercial nature and shallow lyrics. The Doors themselves strongly objected when Elektra Records pressured them to record the song for their third album, since it was one of the first songs they played together and they felt it represented a shallow pop approach that they had long since evolved beyond.

== Composition ==
"Hello, I Love You" was written and first recorded in 1965. It was one of six songs recorded by Rick & the Ravens (a forerunner of the Doors) at World Pacific Jazz studios that the group used to try to secure a record deal. The lyrics were inspired by a young black girl whom Jim Morrison saw at Venice Beach: "Do you hope to pluck this dusky jewel?".

Both the single and Waiting for the Sun liner notes list the song as a group composition; the performance rights organization ASCAP shows the writers as each of the individual Doors members. The majority of the track's structure is notated in the key of A major.

== Plagiarism controversy ==
In the liner notes to The Doors: Box Set, Robby Krieger denied allegations that the song's musical structure was stolen from Ray Davies, where a riff similar to it is featured in the Kinks' "All Day and All of the Night". Instead, Krieger said the song's drum beat was taken from Cream's song "Sunshine of Your Love". But Davies commented in a 2012 interview with Mojo magazine:

The funniest thing was when my publisher came to me on tour and said the Doors had used the riff for "All Day and All of the Night" for "Hello, I Love You". I said rather than sue them, can we just get them to own up? My publisher said, "They have, that’s why we should sue them!" (laughs) Jim Morrison admitted it, which to me was the most important thing. The most important thing, actually, is to take (the idea) somewhere else.

In a 2014 interview with Rolling Stone, Davies suggested that an out-of-court settlement had been reached with the Doors. Doors keyboardist Ray Manzarek admitted in an interview with Musician magazine that it was "a lot like a Kinks song."

== Release and charts ==
=== Stereo single ===
At the time the single was released, stereo 45 rpm records were generally unknown – especially in the Top 40 format. This recording by the Doors was promoted as one of the first rock 45 rpm records in stereo. It includes a long musical sweep about 1:20 into the song, starting at the left channel and panning across into the right channel, in a very ostentatious demonstration of stereo effect. This release, along with the Rascals' hit song, "A Beautiful Morning", are credited with initiating the industry changeover to stereo recordings as the norm for 45 rpm singles. Early American pressings of the single used the title "Hello I Love You Won’t You Tell Me Your Name".

=== Reception ===
In a 1968 interview, Morrison said, "Sure, 'Hello, I Love You' isn't one of our best songs, but I am not ashamed of it. Really I like the other side ["Love Street"] better. I was hoping they would flip it and play that, but they haven't.” The single was declared by Billboard as a "solid dance beat throughout." Cash Box said that it is "a steady paced blues track with explosive close (and a stereo gimmick)." Record World said that "The Doors have fun with [the song] and so will their teen following."

=== Charts ===
The song spent two weeks at No. 1 and was also in the Top 5 at the same time as Jose Feliciano's version of "Light My Fire". This put two of the Doors' tunes simultaneously in the Top 5. On its first appearance on the Canadian charts it was listed under the B-side title.

==== Weekly charts ====
Chart (1968)	Peak position
Canada RPM Top Singles	1
Finland (Soumen Virallinen)	25
Germany	33
Netherlands	14
New Zealand	12
South Africa (Springbok)	11
Switzerland	10
UK	15
US Billboard Hot 100	1
US Cash Box Top 100	1

==== Year-end charts ====
Chart (1968)	Rank
Canada	13
US Billboard Hot 100	14
US Cash Box Top 100	15

== Certifications ==
Region	Certification	Certified units/sales
United States (RIAA)	Gold	1,000,000^{^}
^{^} Shipments figures based on certification alone.

== Personnel ==
Details are taken from the 2019 Rhino Records reissue liner notes.

The Doors

- Jim Morrison – vocals
- Ray Manzarek – keyboards
- Robby Krieger – guitar
- John Densmore – drums

Additional musicians

- Douglas Lubahn - electric bass

Technical

- Paul A. Rothchild – production
- Bruce Botnick – engineering
