= John Densmore =

American drummer (born 1944)

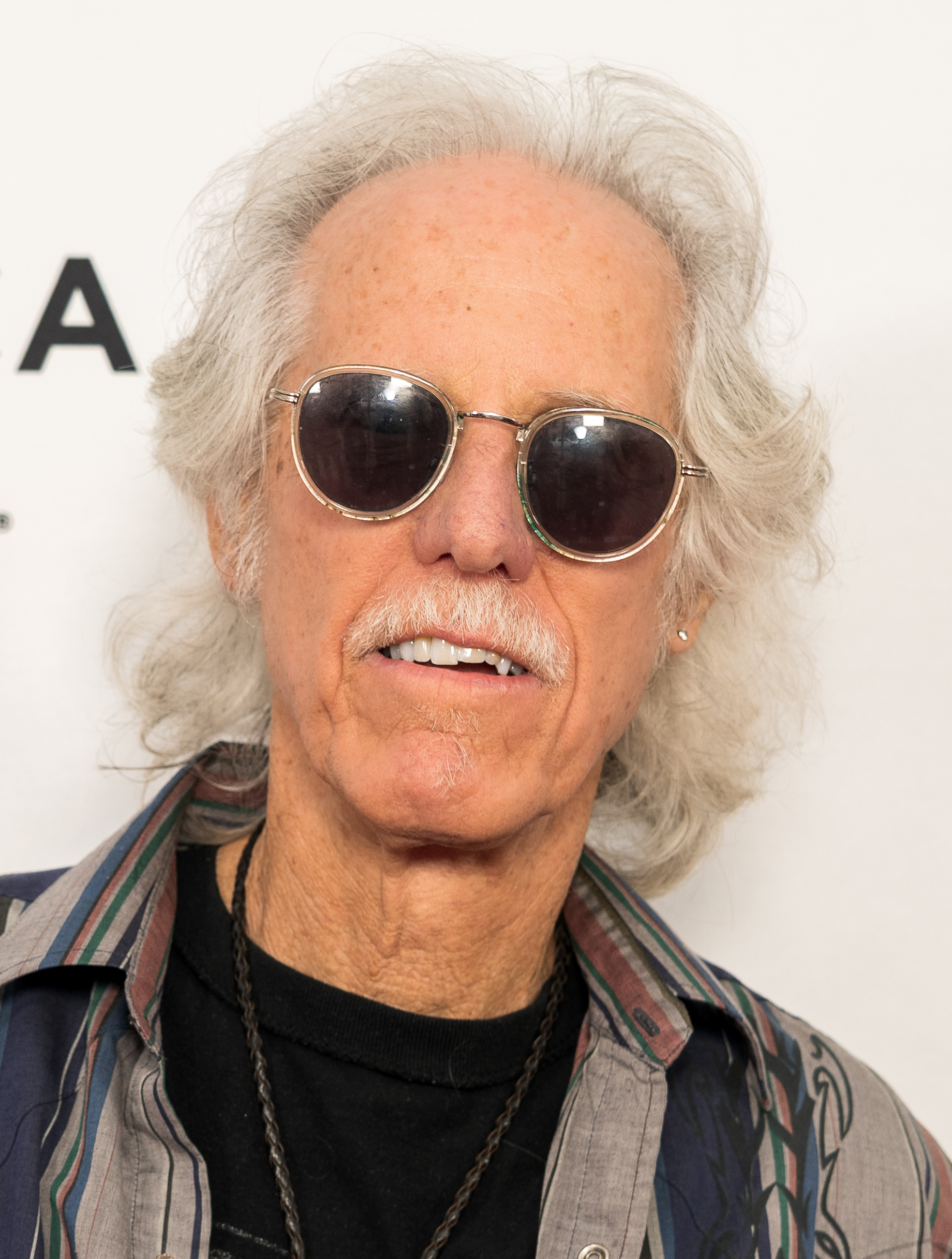
- Densmore in 2025

Background information
- Born: John Paul Densmore; December 1, 1944 (age 81); Los Angeles, California, U.S.
- Genres: Rock; psychedelia; jazz fusion
- Occupations: Musician; songwriter; author; actor
- Instrument: Drums
- Years active: 1964–present
- Formerly of: The Doors
- Website: johndensmore.com

John Paul Densmore (born December 1, 1944) is an American musician. He is best known as the drummer of the rock band the Doors and as such is a member of the Rock and Roll Hall of Fame. He appeared on every recording made by the band, with drumming inspired by jazz and world music as much as by rock and roll. The many honors he shares with the other Doors include a Grammy Award for lifetime achievement and a star on the Hollywood Walk of Fame.

Densmore is also noted for his veto of attempts by the other two Doors members, in the wake of singer Jim Morrison's 1971 death, to accept offers to license the rights to various Doors songs for commercial purposes as well as his objections to their use in the 21st century of the Doors name and logo. Densmore's lengthy court battles to gain compliance with his veto, based on a 1960s contract requiring unanimity among Doors members to use the band's name or music, ended with victory for him and his allies in the Morrison estate.

Densmore has also worked in the performing arts as a dancer and actor and written successfully as both a playwright and the author of two books on the topic of the Doors and a third book, The Seekers (2020), about a selection of notable people he has worked with and encountered.

== Early life ==
Densmore was born in Los Angeles on December 1, 1944. He grew up playing piano and later took up drums/percussion for the marching band at his school. He also played timpani in orchestra. Densmore attended Santa Monica City College and California State University, Northridge; at the latter he studied ethnic music under jazz cellist Fred Katz.

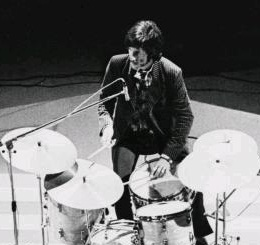
Densmore at a live concert with the Doors in Copenhagen, Denmark in 1968

Densmore's drumming influences included hard jazz figures Elvin Jones (drummer for John Coltrane), whom he referred to as his idol, and Art Blakey.

== The Doors ==
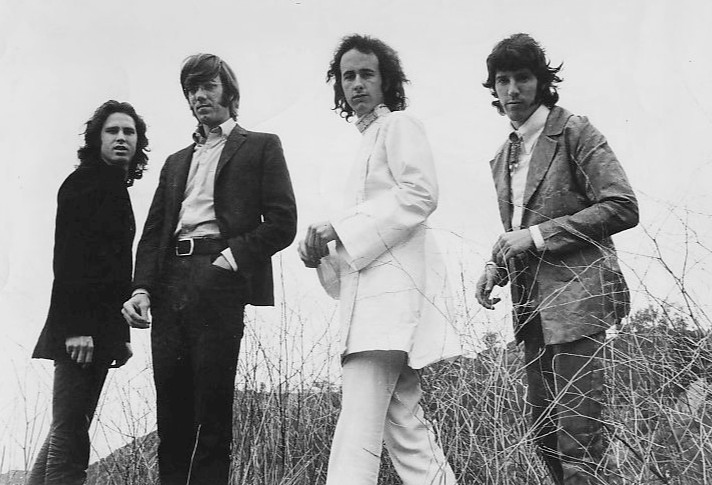
Densmore (far right) in a 1969 publicity photo of the Doors

In the mid-1960s, Densmore joined guitarist Robby Krieger in a band called the Psychedelic Rangers; shortly thereafter he began rehearsals with keyboardist Ray Manzarek, Manzarek's two brothers and Jim Morrison in the group Rick & the Ravens. On the brothers' departure from the band, Densmore recommended Krieger join them, thus forming the Doors in 1965.

In 2010, Modern Drummer magazine referred to his ride cymbal work as some of the most distinctive in classic rock, and noted "Working without a regular bass-playing foil ... Densmore favored a lean, crisp, clear style in feel-good rhythmic explorations that, like the band's songs, gathered together ideas from blues, pop, jazz, classical, and Latin, Eastern, and African music. There are many reasons to love this slyly inventive, often underrated drummer." Together with Krieger, Densmore studied under Indian sitarist Ravi Shankar at the latter's Kinnara School of Music in Los Angeles.

John—a brilliant drummer, "The End" proved that, in my book; that's some of the greatest drumming I've ever heard in my life; irrespective of the fact that I'm involved in this album, it's incredibly creative drumming—has an instinct for when. During a very quiet part he'll just come in with three drum shots that are about as loud as you can hit a drum, and they're right, they're absolutely right! Now, you can't plan those things."

— Doors' producer Paul Rothchild, from a March 1967 interview published in Crawdaddy.

The quartet, after two years of work, became star attractions in 1967, and released six studio and several live albums, eventually selling over 100 million units.

According to Densmore's autobiography, he had quit the band on one occasion in reaction to Morrison's increasingly self-destructive behavior, although Densmore returned the next day. Densmore repeatedly suggested that the band stop touring, but Krieger and Manzarek were resistant to this notion. After the Doors' disastrous performance with a gibberish-spouting Morrison in New Orleans on December 12, 1970, the band agreed to stop performing live, and the concert was the Doors' last public appearance as a quartet.

When Morrison died in 1971, the surviving trio recorded two more albums of songs and an instrumental backdrop for the late singer's recorded poetry. Densmore remained a member until the band's dissolution in 1973.

== Later career ==
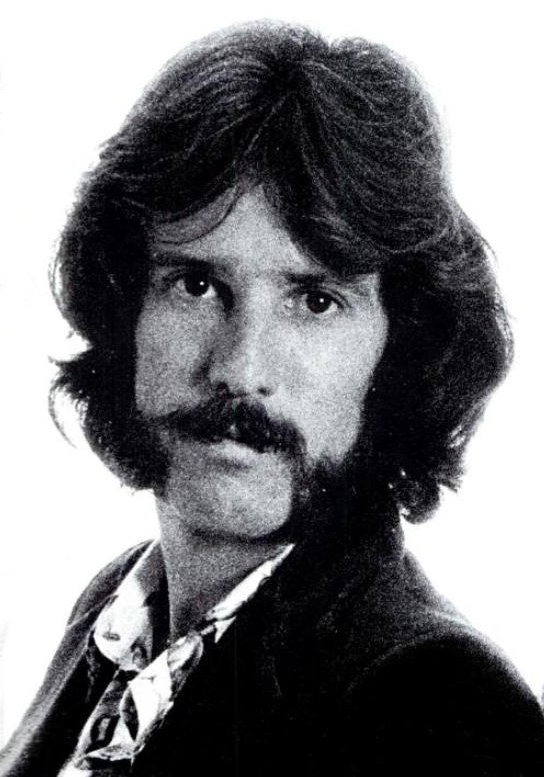
Densmore in 1971

Densmore formed a musical group with fellow ex-Doors member Krieger in 1973 called the Butts Band. The group released two albums with two different lineups, and disbanded in 1975. Densmore left rock and roll in the 1980s, moving to the world of dance as he performed with Bess Snyder and Co., touring the United States for two years.

In 1984, at La Mama Theatre in New York, he made his stage acting debut in Skins, a one-act play he had written. In 1985, he won the LA Weekly Theater Award for music with Methusalem, directed by Tim Robbins. The play Rounds, which he co-produced, won the NAACP award for theatre in 1987. In 1988, he played a feature role in Band Dreams and Bebop at the Gene Dynarski Theatre. He developed and performed a one-man piece from the Donald Barthelme short story, The King of Jazz, at the Wallenboyd Theatre in 1989. With Adam Ant, he co-produced Be Bop A Lula at Theatre Theatre in 1992. He has acted in numerous TV shows, most memorably as himself in the show Square Pegs, working as a drummer for Johnny Slash's band Open 24 Hours, and in an episode of Beverly Hills 90210 in 1992, in Series 2, Episode 23, where he plays Ben, Dylan's sponsor.

He also produced and co-scored the feature film, Window of Opportunity, a dark comedy about corporate greed written and directed by Samuel Warren Joseph. His other film credits include Get Crazy with Malcolm McDowell, Dudes directed by Penelope Spheeris, and The Doors directed by Oliver Stone. In the Stone film, he appeared as the recording engineer to Morrison’s solo sessions, which would eventually become An American Prayer, while his younger self was portrayed by actor Kevin Dillon, who also worked with Stone on Platoon (1986).

Densmore wrote his best-selling autobiography, Riders on the Storm (1990), about his life and the time he spent with Morrison and the Doors. In the first chapter Densmore describes the solemn day on which he and the band finally visited Morrison's grave around three years after Morrison's death.

Densmore's other books include The Seekers (2020), in which he discusses notable people in his life who have made a great impact on him and others.

Densmore appears alongside Krieger and Manzarek in 2012's RE:GENERATION, a documentary directed by Amir Bar-Lev. It features Densmore collaborating on a new song with Skrillex titled "Breakn' A Sweat". In 2026, Densmore recorded an album with Chuck D as doPE - with the name making direct references to their respective groups. Their project No Country For Old Men was released on Record Store Day.

=== Stand against commercialization ===
Densmore, Manzarek and Krieger, after Jim Morrison's death, allowed "Riders on the Storm" to be used to sell Pirelli Tyres, but in the United Kingdom only. Densmore later stated that he "heard Jim's voice" in his ears and ended up donating his share of the money earned to charity. In 2003, Densmore vetoed an offer by Cadillac of $15 million for "Break On Through (To the Other Side)" citing Morrison's historic and vehement opposition to licensing the Doors' music, notably their best-selling single "Light My Fire" for a Buick television commercial, as well as Densmore's strong negative views on the subject of commercially licensing Doors songs and recordings. Densmore also objected to Manzarek and Krieger touring using the name "Doors of the 21st Century."

In a subsequent court case, in which Densmore was joined by the Morrison estate, opposing lawyers attempted to portray Densmore as un-American, a communist and an eco-terrorist. Notable musicians who testified in support of Densmore included Bonnie Raitt, Randy Newman, Neil Young, Tom Petty, Eddie Vedder, and Tom Waits. Stewart Copeland of the Police, who had also performed with Krieger and Manzarek in 2002 and 2003, also testified on behalf of Densmore and the Morrison estate.

In 2013, Densmore released The Doors Unhinged, a book covering his lengthy but victorious legal battle with Krieger and Manzarek over their use of the Doors' name and logo in their touring and Densmore's veto of the Cadillac commercial offer. Manzarek and Densmore reconciled shortly before Manzarek's death in 2013. Densmore and Krieger have occasionally appeared together on stage again.

== Honors ==
As a member of the Doors, he was inducted into the Rock and Roll Hall of Fame in 1993. Along with his 1993 induction into the Rock and Roll Hall of Fame, Densmore, as a member of the Doors, was recognized in 2007 with a star on the Hollywood Walk of Fame. Also in 2007, Densmore and his band mates were awarded a Grammy Award for lifetime achievement. The Rock and Roll Hall of Fame webpage on the Doors observes that "As a drummer, Densmore had a creative, dynamic flair that lent itself to the Doors' surreal, kaleidoscopic music."

He and the Doors have been saluted twice by the City of Los Angeles, which in 2017 issued a proclamation at a public gathering in Venice Beach observing January 4 as the 'Day of the Doors' in honor of the 50th anniversary of the group's self-titled album release on that date in 1967. At the event, Los Angeles Councilmember Mike Bonin introduced Densmore and Krieger who ceremonially lit a Doors logo beneath the famed 'Venice' letters. A year later, on January 4, 2018, Densmore accepted a second proclamation from Los Angeles Council member Paul Koretz at the junction of Densmore Avenue and Morrison Street in Encino, Los Angeles in the San Fernando Valley in which honorary street signs were unveiled.

== Personal life ==
Densmore has married four times. He married his first wife Julia Brose in 1970 with Robby and Lynn Krieger as best man and bridesmaid. They separated in 1972. A few years after their divorce he married Debbie Fife but they divorced a few years later. He then married actress Leslie Neale in 1990 and they had one daughter. They subsequently separated in 2006 due to irreconcilable differences and divorced. Since 2012 he has been in a relationship with Ildiko Von Somogyi, whom he married in 2020.

== Discography ==
- No Country For Old Men (with Chuck D as doPE) (2026)

== Books ==
- Densmore, John (1990). Riders On the Storm: My Life with Jim Morrison and The Doors. New York: Dell Publishing. OCLC 20853389.
- —— (2013). The Doors Unhinged: Jim Morrison's Legacy Goes on Trial. North Charleston, South Carolina: Percussive Press. OCLC 1376495180.
- —— (2020). The Seekers: Meetings with Remarkable Musicians (and Other Artists). New York: Hachette Books. OCLC 1143651422.

== See also ==
- Outline of the Doors
