= R-Evolution (film) =

2013 music documentary on The Doors

- Music by: The Doors
- Production company: Eagle Rock
- Release date: November 25, 2013
- Running time: 154 minutes
- Country: United States
- Language: English

R-Evolution is a 2013 music documentary featuring 19 live performances, TV performances and music videos by American rock band the Doors. The compilation features TV performances not previously released as well as original music videos from the 1960s, the 1980s and the 1990s. All archive footage was digitally restored and the sound was remixed and mastered for 5.1 by Bruce Botnick. It was released by Eagle Rock on November 25, 2013.

The compilation features audio commentaries by Doors members John Densmore, Robby Krieger and the late Ray Manzarek. There are also commentaries by long-time Doors' sound engineer/co-producer Bruce Botnick and Jac Holzman, founder of Elektra Records. Bonus material includes a performance of "Break On Through (To the Other Side)" from the Doors' appearance at the Isle Of Wight Festival in 1970 (restored and edited by original director Murray Lerner), a 45-minute documentary entitled the Doors – "Breaking Through The Lens", and "Love Thy Customer", a 1966 Ford training film with instrumental music by the Doors plus outtakes from the band's appearance on the TV show Malibu U in 1967.

== TV shows and music videos ==
The Doors' March 6, 1967 appearance playing "Break On Through (To the Other Side)" on local Los Angeles TV show Shebang (hosted by Casey Casem) was their first television performance. The performance predates their first break-through hit "Light My Fire". The performance was mimed to a backing track.

On July 22, 1967, the Doors appeared on American Bandstand and lip-synced to "The Crystal Ship" and "Light My Fire". Excerpts of the band playing "The Crystal Ship" have been previously published but the full song appears on this release for the first time. The band is interviewed between the two songs. The Doors also performed "Light My Fire" on the Malibu U TV show on August 25, 1967. Initially Jim Morrison was not at the shooting and Robby Krieger’s brother, Ron, stood in with his back to the camera. Morrison was later recorded on the studio roof and the two performances were edited together.

The full unedited version of the Elektra promo film "The Unknown Soldier" from February 1968. On September 13, 1968 the band played their No. 1 hit "Hello, I Love You" on German TV show Musik Für Junge Leute: 4-3-2-1 Hot & Sweet.

On CBS's The Smothers Brothers Comedy Hour Morrison sings "Touch Me" live over a backing track. The band also mime to "Wild Child". Recorded December 15, 1968. The last known footage of the Doors playing together is rehearsal footage of "Crawling King Snake" recorded in the Doors Workshop on Santa Monica Blvd in late 1970. Originally appeared on an Australian TV show called "GTK – Get To Know". The song "Gloria" appeared on the live album Alive, She Cried in 1983. A compilation video of live performances was created for MTV. Kit Fitzgerald's 1997 music video recreated the album cover for Strange Days.

== Track listing ==
=== DVD/Blu-ray ===
1. "Break On Through (To the Other Side)" - Elektra promo film, January 1967
2. "Break On Through (To the Other Side)" - Shebang TV show, March 6, 1967
3. "The Crystal Ship" - American Bandstand, July 22, 1967
4. "Light My Fire" - American Bandstand, July 22, 1967
5. "Light My Fire" - Malibu U TV show, August 25, 1967
6. "People Are Strange" - Murray the K, September 22, 1967
7. "Moonlight Drive" - The Jonathan Winters Show, December 27, 1967
8. "The Unknown Soldier" - Elektra promo film, February 1968
9. "Hello, I Love You" - Musik Für Junge Leute: 4-3-2-1 Hot & Sweet TV show, September 13, 1968
10. "Touch Me" - The Smothers Brothers Comedy Hour TV show, December 15, 1968
11. "Wild Child" - Archive footage of the band in the studio, 1969
12. "Roadhouse Blues" - Live performance footage, February 1970
13. "Crawling King Snake" - Rehearsal footage for "GTK – Get To Know" (Australia), December 1970
14. "The Changeling" - Archival footage, April 1971
15. "Gloria" - Live performance footage, October 1983
16. "People Are Strange" - 1984 music video
17. "Strange Days" - Kit Fitzgerald music video, 1984
18. "L.A. Woman" - Ray Manzarek video, 1985 (first appeared on Dance on Fire (1985))
19. "Ghost Song" - Music video, 1995

=== Bonus features ===
- "Love Thy Customer" - 1966 Ford training film featuring instrumental music by the Doors
- "Break On Through" (To the Other Side)" - Isle of Wight Festival, 1970
- "Light My Fire" - outtakes Malibu U TV show, 1967
- "Breaking Through The Lens" - Documentary

== Personnel ==
- 1966-1971 - Jim Morrison, Robbie Krieger, John Densmore, Ray Manzarek
