= A Tribute to Jim Morrison =

- Directed by: Gordon Forbes III
- Written by: Ben Fong-Torres
- Produced by: Richard Mann; Lawrence Smith
- Music by: The Doors
- Distributed by: Warner Home Video
- Release date: 1981
- Running time: 60 minutes
- Country: United States
- Language: English

A Tribute to Jim Morrison (titled on-screen as No One Here Gets Out Alive) is a 1981 documentary about Jim Morrison, lead singer of American rock band the Doors who died in July 1971.

The documentary explores Morrison's interest in film (he was a graduate of UCLA film school), poetry, psychology, mysticism and sexuality. Excerpts of Doors songs are included with only TV appearances playing "Light My Fire" and "Touch Me" played in their entirety. It features contemporary interviews with Morrison as well as interviews with all the surviving members of the group (Ray Manzarek, John Densmore and Robby Krieger), record producer Paul A. Rothchild and Doors' biographers Danny Sugerman and Jerry Hopkins (on whose best-seller No One Here Gets Out Alive the documentary is based on).

Archive film in the documentary is drawn from Granada TV's The Doors Are Open, the band's appearance at the Hollywood Bowl in July 1968, snippets from the then unreleased film Feast of Friends, the opening scene of Apocalypse Now featuring the Doors' song "The End" and television appearances on The Jonathan Winters Show, The Ed Sullivan Show and The Smothers Brothers Comedy Hour.

Many original photos of Morrison and the band are included from Joel Brodsky, Paul Ferrara, Jerry Hopkins, Frank Lisciandro and Gloria Stavers.

The documentary was re-titled upon release on DVD but is now out of print.

== Track listing ==
1. "Five to One" – excerpt of song from album Waiting for the Sun
2. "People Are Strange" – excerpt from Elektra Records promo clip
3. "Back Door Man" – excerpt from The Doors Are Open, Roundhouse, London, September 1968
4. "Light My Fire" – performance from The Ed Sullivan Show September 17, 1967
5. "Celebration of the Lizard – excerpt from The Doors Are Open, Roundhouse, London, September 1968
6. "When the Music's Over" – excerpt from Hollywood Bowl, July 5, 1968
7. The End" – excerpt from opening titles of Apocalypse Now
8. "Touch Me" – performance from The Smothers Brothers Comedy Hour December 15, 1968
9. "Moonlight Drive" – excerpt from The Jonathan Winters Show, December 27, 1967
10. "The Changeling" – excerpt of song from album L.A. Woman
11. "Crawling King Snake" – excerpt from The Doors Are Open, Roundhouse, London, September 1968
12. "L.A. Woman" – excerpt from album track off L.A. Woman
13. "The Unknown Soldier" – excerpt from The Doors Are Open, Roundhouse, London, September 1968
