= The Best of The Doors (1985 album) =

The Best of the Doors

Greatest hits album by the Doors
- Released: November 1, 1985
- Recorded: 1966–1971
- Genre: Rock
- Length: 89:20
- Label: Elektra
- Producers: Paul A. Rothchild; Bruce Botnick; The Doors

The Doors chronology
The Doors Classics (1985)	The Best of the Doors (1985)	Live at the Hollywood Bowl (1987)

The Best of The Doors is a compilation album by American rock group the Doors. Released in November 1985, the double LP set contains 19 songs from their six albums with lead singer Jim Morrison, including charting singles and selected album cuts. Danny Sugerman contributed a short essay that discusses the band's origins and influences and Morrison's personality, and was printed inside the gatefold sleeve.

When the album was released on compact disc in 1991 (with one bonus track), it reached number 32 in the U.S. and the top twenty in several other countries. In February 2007, the album was certified diamond by the Recording Industry Association of America.

== Critical reception ==
Professional ratings
Review scores
Source	Rating
AllMusic	4.5/5 stars
The Encyclopedia of Popular Music	4/5 stars

In a retrospective review for AllMusic, Bruce Eder gave the album a rating of four and a half out of five stars. He commented that, when it was released in 1985, The Best of the Doors was the most comprehensive Doors compilation to date and provided a good overview. However, he opined that the Doors' songs are better heard in the context of the original albums than in compilations, and criticized the non-chronological ordering of the tracks. Eder added that the remastering of the Doors discography that began in 1996 "renders this collection somewhat less attractive than it was on its initial release".

== Track listing ==
=== Original album ===
All tracks are written by the Doors (Jim Morrison, Ray Manzarek, Robby Krieger and John Densmore), except as noted. Details are taken from the 1985 U.S. Elektra release; other releases may show different information.

Side one
No.	Title	Original album (year)	Length
1.	"Break On Through (To the Other Side)"	The Doors (1967)	2:25
2.	"Light My Fire"	The Doors	7:05
3.	"The Crystal Ship" (Morrison)	The Doors	2:31
4.	"People Are Strange"	Strange Days (1967)	2:09
5.	"Strange Days"	Strange Days	3:06
6.	"Love Me Two Times"	Strange Days	3:13
7.	"Alabama Song" (Kurt Weill, CD-only bonus track)	The Doors	3:16
Total length:			24:01

Side two
No.	Title	Original album (year)	Length
1.	"Five to One"	Waiting for the Sun (1968)	4:25
2.	"Waiting for the Sun"	Morrison Hotel (1970)	3:57
3.	"Spanish Caravan"	Waiting for the Sun	2:57
4.	"When the Music's Over"	Strange Days	10:55
Total length:			22:20

Side three
No.	Title	Original album (year)	Length
1.	"Hello, I Love You"	Waiting for the Sun	2:14
2.	"Roadhouse Blues"	Morrison Hotel	4:02
3.	"L.A. Woman"	L.A. Woman (1971)	7:48
4.	"Riders on the Storm"	L.A. Woman	7:14
Total length:			21:25

Side four
No.	Title	Original album (year)	Length
1.	"Touch Me"	The Soft Parade (1969)	3:10
2.	"Love Her Madly"	L.A. Woman	3:17
3.	"The Unknown Soldier"	Waiting for the Sun	3:22
4.	"The End"	The Doors	11:41
Total length:			21:39

== Personnel ==
Per album liner notes:

The Doors

- Jim Morrison – vocals, production
- Ray Manzarek – keyboards, production
- John Densmore – drums, production
- Robby Krieger – guitar, production

Technical

- Paul A. Rothchild – production
- Bruce Botnick – engineering, co-production

== Charts ==
=== Weekly charts ===
Chart (1990)	Peak position
Dutch Albums (Album Top 100)	14
Chart (1991)	Peak position
Australian Albums (ARIA)	14
Dutch Albums (Album Top 100)	17
New Zealand Albums (RMNZ)	18
Swiss Albums (Schweizer Hitparade)	4
UK Albums (Official Charts)	17
US Billboard 200	32
Chart (1997)	Peak position
Finnish Albums (Suomen virallinen lista)	9
German Albums (Offizielle Top 100)	57
Chart (1998)	Peak position
Norwegian Albums (VG-lista)	3
UK Albums (Official Charts)	37

=== Year-end charts ===
Chart (1991)	Position
New Zealand Albums (RMNZ)	44
Chart (1993)	Position
Australian Albums (ARIA)	32

== Certifications ==
Region	Certification	Certified units/sales
Argentina (CAPIF)	Platinum	60,000^{^}
Australia (ARIA)	4× Platinum	280,000^{^}
Belgium (BRMA)	Gold	25,000^{*}
Canada (Music Canada)	6× Platinum	600,000^{^}
Finland (Musiikkituottajat)	Gold	22,150
France (SNEP)	Platinum	300,000^{*}
New Zealand (RMNZ)	Platinum	15,000^{^}
Norway (IFPI Norway)	Gold	25,000^{*}
Spain (Promusicae)	Gold	50,000^{^}
Switzerland (IFPI Switzerland)	Platinum	50,000^{^}
United Kingdom (BPI)	Platinum	300,000^{^}
United States (RIAA)	Diamond	5,000,000
^{*} Sales figures based on certification alone.^{^} Shipments figures based on certification alone.

== See also ==
- List of best-selling albums in the United States
