= The Doors Classics =

Greatest hits album by the Doors
- Released: May 1985
- Recorded: 1966–1971
- Genre: Rock
- Length: 44:39
- Label: Elektra
- Producers: Paul A. Rothchild; Bruce Botnick; The Doors

The Doors chronology
Alive, She Cried (1983)	The Doors Classics (1985)	The Best of The Doors (1985)

The Doors Classics is a compilation album by the American rock band the Doors, released in 1985 on Elektra Records. The album has never been issued on CD.

== Critical reception ==
Professional ratings
Review scores
Source	Rating
AllMusic	2/5 stars
The Encyclopedia of Popular Music	4/5 stars

AllMusic critic William Ruhlmann rated The Doors Classics with two out of five stars in his review of the compilation album, formulating:

It's hard to say what the rationale was for this compilation of miscellaneous, previously released Doors tracks, except of course that the group was very hot in the mid-'80s and just about anything by them would sell. Or resell, as the case may be.

== Track listing ==
=== Original album ===
All tracks are written by all four members of the Doors individually except where noted. Details are taken from the 1985 original Elektra Records release.

Side one
No.	Title	Writer(s)	Original album	Length
1.	"Strange Days"		Strange Days (1967)	3:05
2.	"Love Her Madly"		L.A. Woman (1971)	3:18
3.	"Waiting for the Sun"	Morrison	Morrison Hotel (1970)	3:58
4.	"My Eyes Have Seen You"		Strange Days (1967)	2:22
5.	"Wild Child"	Morrison	The Soft Parade (1969)	2:36
6.	"The Crystal Ship"		The Doors (1967)	2:30
7.	"Five to One"		Waiting for the Sun (1968)	4:22

Side two
No.	Title	Writer(s)	Original album	Length
1.	"Roadhouse Blues (Live)"	Morrison, the Doors	An American Prayer (1978)	3:49
2.	"Land Ho!"	Morrison, Krieger	Morrison Hotel (1970)	4:08
3.	"I Can't See Your Face in My Mind"		Strange Days (1967)	3:18
4.	"Peace Frog"	Morrison, Krieger	Morrison Hotel (1970)	2:51
5.	"The WASP (Texas Radio and the Big Beat)"		L.A. Woman (1971)	4:12
6.	"The Unknown Soldier"		Waiting for the Sun (1968)	3:10

== Personnel ==
Per liner notes:

The Doors

- Jim Morrison – vocals
- Robby Krieger – guitar
- Ray Manzarek – keyboard, bass
- John Densmore – drums

Technical

- Paul A. Rothchild − production on all tracks except on "Love Her Madly", and "The WASP (Texas Radio and the Big Beat)"
- Bruce Botnick − engineer, co-production (along with the Doors) on "Love Her Madly", and "The WASP (Texas Radio and the Big Beat)"
