= Live at the Hollywood Bowl (The Doors album) =

1987 album by The Doors

Live album by the Doors
- Released: May 1987
- Recorded: July 5, 1968
- Venues: Hollywood Bowl, Los Angeles
- Genre: Rock
- Length: 22:19; 71:05 (2012 version)
- Label: Elektra
- Producer: Paul A. Rothchild

The Doors chronology
| The Best of The Doors (1985) | Live at the Hollywood Bowl (1987) | The Doors: Original Soundtrack Recording (1991) |

Live at the Hollywood Bowl is the third official live album by the American rock band the Doors, released in May 1987 by Elektra Records. The concert was recorded on July 5, 1968, at the Hollywood Bowl in Los Angeles, the Doors' hometown.

A VHS video of the concert was also released, containing 14 songs. The full version of the concert, entitled Live at the Bowl '68, was released in October 2012 on CD, LP and Blu-ray Disc. A shortened version of the concert is on The Doors - 30 Years Commemorative Edition DVD.

== Recording ==
The entire concert was recorded using several cameras and is one of only two live performances of the band that was professionally recorded in color (the other being Live at The Isle of Wight Festival 1970). The Doors' longtime sound engineer Bruce Botnick recorded the concert direct from the soundboard onto an 8-track machine. The recording of "The End" was used in the film project Feast of Friends, which was not released until November 2014.

Problems with Morrison's microphone made the opening song ("When the Music's Over"), as well as three other songs ("Hello, I Love You", "The WASP (Texas Radio and the Big Beat)" and "Spanish Caravan") somewhat distorted. This was digitally rectified for the 2012 release by Bruce Botnick, using various clips of Morrison's voice from other recordings, including their 1970 live album Absolutely Live. The 2012 edition of the concert also made use of some different camera angles than the version released on video in 1987.

== Critical reception ==
Professional ratings
Review scores
| Source | Rating |
|---|---|
| AllMusic | 3.5/5 stars |
| Robert Christgau | C− |
| Record Collector | 3/5 stars |

Bruce Eder, in a review for AllMusic, gave the album three and a half out of five stars, calling it "a good companion to the other live archival issues of its era, although none of it holds a candle to the New York concert included in The Doors: Box Set [1997]".

== Track listing ==
=== 1987 LP version ===
All tracks are written by the Doors (Jim Morrison, Ray Manzarek, Robby Krieger and John Densmore), except where noted. Details are taken from the 1987 Elektra Records album and may differ from other sources.

Side one
| No. | Title | Length |
|---|---|---|
| 1. | "Wake Up" | 1:40 |
| 2. | "Light My Fire" | 8:15 |
| Total length: | | 9:55 |

Side two
| No. | Title | Length |
|---|---|---|
| 3. | "The Unknown Soldier" | 4:14 |
| 4. | "A Little Game" | 1:20 |
| 5. | "The Hill Dwellers" | 2:21 |
| 6. | "Spanish Caravan" | 1:19 |
| Total length: | | 9:14 19:09 |

=== 1987 CD version ===
| No. | Title | Length |
|---|---|---|
| 1. | "Wake Up!" | 1:40 |
| 2. | "Light My Fire" | 8:15 |
| 3. | "The Unknown Soldier" | 4:23 |
| 4. | "A Little Game" | 1:22 |
| 5. | "The Hill Dwellers" | 2:20 |
| 6. | "Spanish Caravan" | 1:19 |
| 7. | "Light My Fire (edit of live version)" | 3:24 |
| Total length: | | 22:43 |

- Tracks 1, 4, and 5 are from "Celebration of the Lizard".

=== 2012 version (Live at the Bowl '68) ===
All tracks are written by The Doors except tracks 3, 4 and 6.

| No. | Title | Length |
|---|---|---|
| 1. | "Slow Start/Intro" | 0:19 |
| 2. | "When the Music's Over" | 12:52 |
| 3. | "Alabama Song (Whisky Bar)" (Written by Bertolt Brecht, Kurt Weill) | 1:33 |
| 4. | "Back Door Man" (Written by Willie Dixon, Chester Burnett) | 2:33 |
| 5. | "Five to One" | 1:29 |
| 6. | "Back Door Man (reprise)" (Written by Willie Dixon, Chester Burnett) | 1:22 |
| 7. | "The WASP (Texas Radio and the Big Beat)" | 1:52 |
| 8. | "Hello, I Love You" | 2:14 |
| 9. | "Moonlight Drive" | 3:21 |
| 10. | "Horse Latitudes" | 1:08 |
| 11. | "A Little Game" | 1:20 |
| 12. | "The Hill Dwellers" | 2:22 |
| 13. | "Spanish Caravan" | 3:04 |
| 14. | "Hey, What Would You Guys Like to Hear?" | 0:40 |
| 15. | "Wake Up!" | 1:30 |
| 16. | "Light My Fire" | 9:32 |
| 17. | "Light My Fire (segue)" | 0:38 |
| 18. | "The Unknown Soldier" | 4:43 |
| 19. | "The End (segue)" | 1:02 |
| 20. | "The End" | 17:31 |
| Total length: | | 1:11:05 |

== Video version ==
Live at the Hollywood Bowl

Video by the Doors
- Released: 1987
- Recorded: July 5, 1968
- Venues: Hollywood Bowl, Los Angeles
- Genre: Rock
- Length: 62:00
- Label: MCA Home Video
- Director: Paul Ferrara
- Producer: Rick Schmidlin

The Doors videos chronology
| The Doors Are Open (1998) | Live at the Hollywood Bowl (1987) | The Doors - 30 Years Commemorative Edition (2001) |

=== 1987/2000 version ===
1. "When the Music's Over"
2. "Alabama Song (Whisky Bar)" (Bertolt Brecht, Kurt Weill)
3. "Back Door Man" (Willie Dixon)
4. "Five to One"
5. "Back Door Man" (Reprise)
6. "Moonlight Drive"
7. "Horse Latitudes"
8. "A Little Game" (Excerpt from "Celebration of the Lizard")
9. "The Hill Dwellers" (Excerpt from "The Celebration of the Lizard")
10. "Spanish Caravan" (Edited version)
11. "Wake Up"
12. "Light My Fire"
13. "The Unknown Soldier"
14. "The End"

=== 2012 version ===
1. Show Start/Intro
2. "When The Music’s Over"
3. "Alabama Song (Whisky Bar)" (Bertolt Brecht, Kurt Weill)
4. "Back Door Man" (Willie Dixon)
5. "Five To One"
6. "Back Door Man" (reprise) (Dixon)
7. "The WASP" (Texas Radio and the Big Beat)
8. "Hello, I Love You"
9. "Moonlight Drive"
10. "Horse Latitudes"
11. "A Little Game"
12. "The Hill Dwellers"
13. "Spanish Caravan"
14. "Hey, What Would You Guys Like to Hear?"
15. "Wake Up!"
16. "Light My Fire" (Segue)
17. "Light My Fire"
18. "The Unknown Soldier"
19. "The End" (Segue)
20. "The End"

Special Features

- Echoes from the Bowl
- You Had to Be There
- Reworking the Doors
- Television Performances:
1. "Wild Child" (from The Smothers Brothers Show, 1968)
2. "Light My Fire" (from The Jonathan Winters Show, 1967)
3. "Gloria" (music video)

== Personnel ==
The Doors

- Jim Morrison – vocals, percussion
- Ray Manzarek – keyboards, keyboard bass, background vocals
- Robby Krieger – electric guitar
- John Densmore – drums
