= London Fog 1966 =

Live album by the Doors
- Released: December 16, 2016
- Recorded: May 1966
- Venues: London Fog, Los Angeles
- Genre: Rock
- Length: 32:04
- Labels: Rhino & Bright Midnight Archives
- Producer: Bruce Botnick

The Doors chronology
Live in Vancouver 1970 (2010)	London Fog 1966 (2016)	Live at the Isle of Wight Festival 1970 (2018)

London Fog 1966 is a live album by the American rock band the Doors, released on December 16, 2016, by Rhino Records. It contains a previously unreleased live performance at the London Fog in Los Angeles in May 1966. It was recorded by spectator Nettie Peña before the band released their highly successful debut album on January 4, 1967. Considered to be the earliest known live recording of the Doors, London Fog 1966 includes versions of eventual album tracks and covers of blues standards.

Issued to coincide with celebrations for the 50th anniversary of the Doors' first album, London Fog 1966 was overseen by the band's longtime sound engineer/producer Bruce Botnick and Peña. Among the lavish packaging for the live album, each disc appears in an enlarged box set, and each copy of the set is individually numbered.

== Background ==
A few months after the Doors formed, they earned their first steady gig in February or March 1966 at the London Fog, a nightclub on the Sunset Strip. The band earned $5 per night, playing for relatively few patrons; new to performing, Jim Morrison frequently sang with his back toward the small crowd. Ray Manzarek remarked that the London Fog was where the group "became a collective entity, this unit of oneness". Although they covered some blues standards, most of the time the Doors honed their signature sound and material that later appeared on their first two albums – The Doors and Strange Days – also adding improvised solos to extend the set times.

In May 1966, UCLA film student Nettie Peña watched and recorded some of a Doors performance at the London Fog with a reel-to-reel. Two of the songs the band played on the occasion included "You Make Me Real" (which would later appear on Morrison Hotel) and Strange Days (which would later appear on the album of the same name Strange Days). The remaining recordings on the album are renditions of blues standards, including B. B. King's "Rock Me Baby", Little Richard's "Lucille", and "Baby, Please Don't Go", which was recorded by Them in 1964 and hence became a rock standard. However, "You're really only hearing half of that evening's performance" John Densmore said as he alluded to early versions of "Light My Fire" and "The End" that were performed during that gig.

== Release and design ==
The box set was issued on Rhino Records on December 16, 2016; it features the earliest known live recordings of the Doors. Originally, London Fog 1966 was intended for release in 2012 – the "Year of the Doors" – when the reel-to-reels were discovered a year prior. Announcing the release in December 2016, The Guardian described it as "genuinely important" in comparison to the cache of live material by the Doors that has been distributed over the years while Rhino noted Peña was a "pivotal force in this release coming together". London Fog 1966 coincided with Rhino's reissues of the group's studio albums in 2017, celebrating the 50th anniversary of their self-titled debut.

London Fog 1966 was presented in an unusually lavish package designed by David Gorman. Housed in a box set that appears like a vintage storage container, the album features the Doors performance on CD and a 10-inch record that was designed to resemble a test pressing. The band's long-time sound engineer Bruce Botnick mastered the audio for the collection. A limited-edition release, each copy of London Fog 1966 came individually numbered.

The liner notes were penned by Peña and former Whisky a Go Go talent booker Ronnie Haran-Mellen, commenting on the band's early years and the music represented on the discs. Peña supplied five previously unpublished photographs of the Doors, while Densmore supplied the hand-written track listing of the set. In addition, the collection is supplemented with replica memorabilia, including a poster of the Royce Hall UCLA student film screening and a London Fog coaster.

== Reception ==
Professional ratings
Review scores
Source	Rating
AllMusic	3/5 stars
Classic Rock	4/5 stars
PopMatters	(mixed)
Relix	(favorable)

AllMusic critic Stephen Thomas Erlewine had praise for the high quality of the production of London Fog 1966, writing that "the oversized box is handsome and the photo inserts and posters luxurious". Erlewine commented the album "showcases a band who doesn't know its own attributes, and that's why it's worthwhile: it's the sound of a band discovering its own strengths". Reviewing for Team Rock, Gavin Martin wrote "The Doors have more ambition in them and two originals – an unfettered 'You Make Me Real', four years from being recorded, and second album title track 'Strange Days' – show just how far ahead they are".

John Paul of PopMatters notes the historical significance of London Fog 1966 but found "the performances themselves leave much to be desired". Paul elaborated: "In other words, London Fog 1966 could well be subtitled 'First Band Rehearsal' (not literally, of course, but it would give a better idea of what to expect, sound-wise)". Jeff Tamarkin for Relix wrote that London Fog 1966 shows the Doors' "sound and attitude are in place". "All but the most hardcore fans should take heed", he adds, "despite the fascinating and often exciting performance, the sound quality is fairly abysmal".

== Track listing ==
Side one
No.	Title	Writer(s)	Length
1.	"Tuning (I)"		0:41
2.	"Rock Me Baby"	B.B. King	5:35
3.	"Baby, Please Don't Go"	Big Joe Williams	5:27
4.	"You Make Me Real"	Jim Morrison	2:48

Side two
No.	Title	Writer(s)	Length
1.	"Tuning (II)"		0:13
2.	"Don't Fight It"	Steve Cropper, Wilson Pickett	4:40
3.	"I'm Your Hoochie Coochie Man"	Willie Dixon	5:16
4.	"Strange Days"	The Doors (John Densmore, Robbie Krieger, Ray Manzarek, Morrison)	3:46
5.	"Lucille"	Albert Collins, Richard Penniman	3:44

== Personnel ==
- Jim Morrison – vocals, harmonica, maraca
- Ray Manzarek – organ & vocals, lead vocal on "I'm Your Hoochie Coochie Man"
- Robby Krieger – electric guitar
- John Densmore – drums

== Bibliography ==
- Weidman, Rich (2011). The Doors FAQ: All That's Left to Know About the Kings of Acid Rock. Backbeat Books. ISBN 978-1-61713-017-5.
