= Spanish Caravan =

1968 song by The Doors

Song by the Doors

from the album Waiting for the Sun
- Released: July 3, 1968
- Recorded: January 15, 1968
- Genre: Flamenco • acid rock
- Length: 2:58
- Label: Elektra
- Songwriter: The Doors
- Producer: Paul A. Rothchild

"Spanish Caravan" is a 1968 song written by Robby Krieger, and credited to Jim Morrison, Ray Manzarek, Robby Krieger and John Densmore that was released on The Doors' 1968 album Waiting For The Sun.

== Background and recording ==
"Spanish Caravan" was written by Robby Krieger around late 1966. He was inspired by, and took parts from the songs, Asturias (Leyenda) by Isaac Albéniz, and "Adiós Granada" by Tomas Barrera, and Rafael Calleja. The song was written to showcase Krieger's flamenco guitar skills, which he started learning when he was 17. According to John Densmore, "In rehearsal, I always asked Robby to play flamenco so I could watch his picking. His right hand looked like a crab with many legs crawling over the strings." The song was recorded on January 15, 1968, from 5:00pm-12:00am. Mixing was done by May 3, 1968.

== Composition ==
The song starts with a flamenco intro, played by Krieger. Then it moves to the main theme that is based on Asturias (Leyenda). The first verse mentions places like Portugal, Spain, and Andalusia, the southernmost part of Spain. When the chorus ends, the flamenco guitar stops, and the Asturias theme returns, now played faster on guitar using a fuzz box and backed by Ray Manzarek on organ. Music journalist Doug Sundling interpreted this intensification of the music as representing a "realization that there might be danger" in the journey. The second verse refers to a ship being lost at sea and the romanticized, and mythic wealth of the Iberian Peninsula but ends with a line where the singer says he needs to see his lover again and again. Sundling suggested that despite the second verse's references to gold and silver, the last line means that the treasure that the singer is really interested in is love and happiness. The music then quickens further to what Classic Rock critic Rob Hughes described as "a racing climax" before finishing.

== Release and reception ==
"Spanish Caravan" was released on July 3, 1968, along with the rest of the Waiting For The Sun album. During an interview with Rainier Moddemann of The Doors Quarterly, Robby Krieger stated that the band was sued for borrowing from "Asturias." The Doors were forced to give up some money, but only a little. Krieger explained, "They didn't get very much, 'cause it's such a widely known thing, but they claimed they owned this little something stupid." The song was later included in the 1972 compilation Weird Scenes Inside The Gold Mine.

Pitchfork stated that "Spanish Caravan", and the previous song on the album, "The Unknown Soldier", felt more meandering than the band's longest pieces. They then called both songs "start/stop multi-sectional three-minute songs". Rolling Stone called Krieger's flamenco guitar playing "stirring," while AllMusic called it "interesting." Contrary to the previous 3 opinions, critic Bob Shayne of the L.A. Free Press commented that "Spanish Caravan" included some of the worst lyrics he had ever heard in his life. Culture journalist Tony Thompson also found the lyrics to be "a bit daft" but regarded the song as being "gloriously romantic" and a high point on Waiting for the Sun, which he felt deserved consideration for a single release. Music journalist Harvey Kubernik called it a "delight".

== Live performances ==
The first live performance of "Spanish Caravan" was on January 6, 1967, at the Fillmore Auditorium in San Francisco. John Densmore mentioned in his autobiography, "Riders On The Storm" that the people in the first few rows stared at the band like they were from another planet. He also stated, "[During] Robby's solo in 'Spanish Caravan," Jim [Morrison] got down on his knees to get a closer look at Robby's fingers."

The song continued to be on the Doors' concert setlists with varying regularity through 1969. The most famous performance was at the Hollywood Bowl, on July 5, 1968. Video of this performance is included on Live at the Bowl '68. Another performances one at the Roundhouse in September of 1968 was released on video on the documentary The Doors Are Open. The final performance was at Madison Square Garden on January 24, 1969. As of 2026, Robby Krieger still performs the song on tour, starting around 2010. He performed it with Doors drummer John Densmore at the Los Angeles County Museum of Art on December 5, 2013.

== Personnel ==
Details are taken from the 2019 Rhino Records reissue liner notes.

The Doors

- Jim Morrison – vocals
- Ray Manzarek – harpsichord and Gibson G-101
- Robby Krieger – flamenco and electric guitar
- John Densmore – drums

Additional musicians

- Douglas Lubahn - electric bass
- Leroy Vinnegar - acoustic bass

Technical

- Paul A. Rothchild – production
- Bruce Botnick – engineering
