= The Doors Collection =

Video by the Doors
- Released: April 13, 1999
- Recorded: 1966 – 1970
- Genre: Rock
- Length: 184 minutes: "Hollywood Bowl": 62:22; "Dance on Fire": 65:19; "The Soft Parade": 47:32; "Bonus": 9:02
- Label: Universal
- Producer: Rick Schmidlin

The Doors chronology
Live at the Hollywood Bowl (2001)	The Doors Collection (1999)	When You're Strange (2009)

The Doors Collection is a music video compilation by the American rock band the Doors, released on Laserdisc and DVD in 1995 and 1999, respectively. It compiles three films previously released on VHS by MCA/Universal Home Video: Dance on Fire (1985), Live at the Hollywood Bowl (1987) and The Soft Parade – A Retrospective (1991).

Dance on Fire (65 mins) is a collection of promotional clips, live concert performances, TV appearances and rare behind-the-scenes film footage. It was directed by keyboardist Ray Manzarek and includes 14 songs one of which is a short film by Manzarek backed by the song "L.A. Woman".

Live at the Hollywood Bowl (62 min) is a Doors' concert filmed live at the Hollywood Bowl in the summer of 1968.

The Soft Parade - A Retrospective (48 mins) includes previously unreleased band performances, interview footage and the Doors' last televised appearance on PBS in 1969 (in the aftermath of Jim Morrison's arrest and later trial for indecent exposure).

Also included are photo galleries, Manzarek's UCLA student films and audio commentary from Manzarek, Robbie Krieger and John Densmore.

The Doors Collection was released in North America in 1999. The DVD was not released in Europe until 2001, where it was titled The Doors 30th Anniversary Collection (2001 was the 30th anniversary of Jim Morrison's death) and had different cover art (pictured here).

== DVD track listing ==
=== Dance on Fire ===
1. "Break On Through (To the Other Side)" (Morrison) – Elektra Promo clip - November 1966
2. "People Are Strange" (Morrison, Krieger) – Montage of clips from Murray the K and The Ed Sullivan Show – September 1967
3. "Light My Fire" (Krieger, Morrison) – The Ed Sullivan Show – September 17, 1967
4. "Wild Child" (Morrison) – October 1968, Recording studio
5. "L.A. Woman" (Morrison) – 1985 short film by Ray Manzarek, extended on DVD
6. "The Unknown Soldier" (The Doors) – Elektra promo clip - March 1968
7. "Roadhouse Blues" (Morrison) – Excerpts from Feast of Friends concert documentary of the 1968 tour
8. "Texas Radio and the Big Beat" / "Love Me Two Times" (Morrison) (Krieger) – Filmed for Danish Television – September 18, 1968
9. "Touch Me" (Krieger) The Smothers Brothers Comedy Hour – December 6, 1968
10. "Horse Latitudes" / "Moonlight Drive" (Morrison) – The Jonathan Winters Show – December 4, 1967
11. "The End" (The Doors) – Filmed live at the Hollywood Bowl – July 5, 1968
12. "The Crystal Ship" (Morrison) – American Bandstand, July 7,1967
13. "Adagio in G Minor" (Tomaso Albinoni) – Instrumental piece recorded during "Waiting for the Sun", played while home movies are shown
14. "Riders on the Storm" (The Doors) – Plays over the end credits

=== Live at the Hollywood Bowl ===
1. "When the Music's Over"
2. "Alabama Song (Whisky Bar)" (Bertolt Brecht, Kurt Weill)
3. "Back Door Man" (Willie Dixon, Chester Burnett)
4. "Five to One" (Jim Morrison)
5. "Back Door Man" (Dixon, Burnett) – Reprise
6. "Moonlight Drive" (Morrison)
7. "Horse Latitudes" (Morrison)
8. "A Little Game" (Morrison) – Excerpt from The Celebration of the Lizard
9. "The Hill Dwellers" (Morrison) – Excerpt from The Celebration of the Lizard
10. "Spanish Caravan" - (The Doors) Edited version
11. "Wake Up" (Morrison)
12. "Light My Fire" (Robby Krieger, Morrison)
13. "The Unknown Soldier" (The Doors)
14. "The End" (The Doors)

=== The Soft Parade: A Retrospective ===
1. "The Changeling" (Morrison) – 1991 short film by The Doors
2. "Wishful Sinful" (Krieger) – PBS TV Show Critique – April 28, 1969
3. "Wild Child" (Morrison) – October 1968, Recording Studio
4. "Build Me a Woman" (Morrison) – PBS TV Show Critique – April 28, 1969
5. "The Unknown Soldier" (The Doors) - Elektra promo clip – March 1968, July 5 1968 & September 6 & 18 1968
6. "The Soft Parade" (Morrison) – PBS TV Show Critique - April 28, 1969
7. "Hello, I Love You" (Morrison) – September 13, 1968, Frankfurt TV Show

=== Laserdisc and 1999 DVD bonus features ===
- Photo galleries "Doors memorabilia" and "Henry Diltz Photographs", with audio commentary by Kerry Humpherys and Diltz, respectively.
- Manzarek's UCLA student films: "Induction" and "Evergreen"
- Excerpt from Densmore's one-man play "Riders on the Storm"
- "The End" (The Doors) as performed by Krieger with Arthur Burrow and Bruce Gary

=== 2001 DVD bonus features ===
- "Break On Through (To the Other Side)" (Morrison) Live at the Isle of Wight Festival 1970
- "The Ghost Song" (Morrison) – from An American Prayer, 1978

== Personnel ==
- 1966-1971 - Jim Morrison, Robbie Krieger, John Densmore, Ray Manzarek
