= Ronnie Haran =

American photographer and band manager

Ronnie Haran (born 1939 or 1940), is an American actress, photographer, publicist, and booking manager, particularly noted for her role in discovering and managing musical talent in the latter half of the 1960s.

Haran began her entertainment career in 1959 as an actress, playing roles in episodic television. In the mid-1960s, Ronnie transitioned from acting to behind-the-scenes roles, first as a publicist and then as a booking manager for the venue, The Whisky a Go Go. Ronnie also supported the careers of The Doors, Love, and Van Morrison during the latter half of the 1960's.

Haran photographed various artists throughout California, including actors (Stuart Whitman, Tuesday Weld, Dudley Moore), musicians (Donovan, Moby Grape, The Doors, Michelle Phillips, The Byrds, David Bowie, a young Michael Jackson, James Brown), and visual artists (Andy Warhol and Paul Morrissey, Alfred Hitchcock, Roman Polanski).

== Early life ==
Haran is the daughter of Gertrude and Harry Rosenthal. When she was 10, a cousin's death prompted her to raise money for the March of Dimes by selling her own baked goods door to door, raising $180. After receiving Ronnie's donation, the March of Dimes shared her contribution, resulting in newspaper coverage and requests for interviews.

== Acting career ==
In the mid-1950s, Haran signed with the William Schuller Agency and began acting in episodic television, traveling frequently between New York and Los Angeles for work. Ronnie was first represented by Bill Kelley of MCA and later by Bob Shapiro of the William Morris Agency. During this time, she appeared in television series of the 1960s, including Ben Casey, Cheyenne, and The Fugitive. She also appeared in the film Come September alongside Rock Hudson, Gina Lollobrigida, Bobby Darin, and Sandra Dee.

Haran made her Broadway debut in 1962, when she replaced Joey Heatherton as Little Margaret in Step on a Crack.

== Club booker and band manager (1966-69) ==
In 1966, Elmer Valentine offered Haran a position assisting his publicist at his new club, the Whisky a Go Go, for $50 a week. She was 26 years old. Ronnie then suggested that the Whisky began serving food, which would permit the club to lower its age requirement from 21 to 18. Within three weeks, her guidance earned her a raise to $75 a week, after she presented it to the West Hollywood Chamber of Commerce to support the change. Haran then became the Whisky's house booker. At this time, the venue began the transition from a discotheque into a club.

== Love ==
When Andy Warhol and Paul Morrissey's Exploding Plastic Inevitable (EPI) made its way to Los Angeles in 1966, stopping at the nightclub The Trip, Ronnie was able to photograph Warhol, Morrissey, and others within this artist circle.

While attending the Exploding Plastic Inevitable, Haran was introduced to Herb Cohen, who at the time was managing the band Love. Cohen had recently told Elmer Valentine that he needed someone to run Love's fan club, which led to Haran being introduced to the group during one of their shows at Bido Lito's. During her first phone call with lead singer Arthur Lee, he surprised her by asking her to fire Cohen. Arthur then appointed Haran as Love's manager.

Haran's photograph of the band was chosen for the back cover of Love's 1967 album Forever Changes and also submitted many images to Crawdaddy magazine for publishing.

== The Doors ==
In 1966, Haran visited London Fog with her friend, Peter Asher, to listen to a group called The Doors. The band was fired that night, and was about to dismember, when Haran offered them a job to be the house band at the Whisky. Haran soon formed a relationship with Jim Morrison. The two cohabitated for a 2 month period in Los Angeles. Haran booked the Doors as the house band from May 23 to August 21, 1966. The Doors regularly opened for the headliners and often played two sets every night. At their final night at the Whisky, the Doors opened for Them, resulting in both Morrisons (Van and Jim) playing "Gloria". In his book, John Densmore discusses the direction that Ronnie had for the Doors during their house band residency at the Whisky.

Haran is also credited with writing the liner notes for the 1966 London Fog album. Haran introduced Jim to Elektra Records, with producer Paul Rothchild and Bruce Botnick.

Haran was involved in contributing her photographs to local underground publications, including World Countdown. World Countdown was a biweekly underground music newspaper published in California by founding editor and compiler, Charles Royal, from August 1966 to July 1969.

== Photography ==
By the early 1970s, she continued photography as her professional career interest, working on sets for both television and film. She contributed to album photography for music labels such as Epic, Elektra, and Columbia, and contributed as a West Coast editor for Show Magazine.

Haran continued her photography and became a location scout and producer in Santa Barbara, leading her own company for three decades. She married Chase Mellen on February 14, 1970. She currently resides in Montecito, California, where she lives with her dog companions.
