= Live in Vancouver 1970 =

Live album by the Doors
- Released: November 22, 2010
- Recorded: June 6, 1970
- Venues: Pacific Coliseum, Vancouver, British Columbia
- Genre: Rock
- Length: 115:45
- Labels: Rhino; Bright Midnight Archives
- Producer: Bruce Botnick

The Doors chronology
Live in New York (2009)	Live in Vancouver 1970 (2010)	London Fog 1966 (2016)

Live in Vancouver 1970 is a two-disc live album by the American rock band the Doors. It was recorded at the Pacific Coliseum in Vancouver, British Columbia, on June 6, 1970. The band were joined by guitar legend Albert King on four songs; Willie Dixon’s "Little Red Rooster", the Motown classic "Money" and the blues standards "Rock Me" and "Who Do You Love?".

The concert was four months into the band's 1970 Roadhouse Blues Tour. Vince Treanor, the Doors’ tour manager, recorded the show for the band on a Sony reel-to-reel machine using two microphones placed on the stage. While not a multi track high fidelity recording, it is a clean, quiet and clear recording.

== Release and reception ==
Professional ratings
Review scores
Source	Rating
AllMusic	3.5/5 stars

The album was released from the Bright Midnight Archives collection which contains a number of previously unreleased live concerts by the Doors. Ray Manzarek, the Doors' keyboardist recalled the concert as "A large audience, lights shining in my eyes, can't see the audience... The Doors are excited because Albert King is coming onstage, so we played great. Then Albert comes on, and we played even better. We played dark and deep and funky. Morrison was just transfixed by Albert King's manual dexterity and adroitness on the guitar, so he was in blues-boy heaven."

== Track listing ==
Disc 1
No.	Title	Writer(s)	Length
1.	"Start of Show"		5:05
2.	"Roadhouse Blues"	Jim Morrison	5:55
3.	"Alabama Song (Whisky Bar)"	Bertolt Brecht, Kurt Weill	2:02
4.	"Back Door Man"	Willie Dixon, Chester Burnett	2:31
5.	"Five to One"	Morrison	6:14
6.	"When the Music's Over"	Morrison, Krieger, Manzarek, Densmore	13:46
7.	"Applause - Jim Morrison Talks"		1:30
8.	"Love Me Two Times"	Robby Krieger	4:15
9.	"Applause - Jim Morrison Talks"		5:05
10.	"Little Red Rooster with Albert King"	Dixon	6:24
11.	"Tuning"		0:25
12.	"Money with Albert King"	Berry Gordy / Janie Bradford	3:06
13.	"Tuning"		1:18
14.	"Rock Me with Albert King"	Muddy Waters	6:39
15.	"Tuning"		0:42
16.	"Who Do You Love?"	Ellas "Bo Diddley" McDaniel	8:06

Disc 2
No.	Title	Writer(s)	Length
1.	"Tuning"		0:52
2.	"Petition the Lord with Prayer"	Morrison	0:39
3.	"Light My Fire"	Krieger, Morrison	17:55
4.	"Tuning"		1:46
5.	"The End ()"	Morrison, Krieger, Manzarek, Densmore	17:58
6.	"Thank You & Good Night ()"		2:12

== Personnel ==
- Jim Morrison – vocals
- Ray Manzarek – organ, keyboard bass
- Robby Krieger – guitar, slide guitar
- John Densmore – drums

Additional musicians

- Albert King – guitar on "Little Red Rooster", "Money", "Rock Me", "Who Do You Love"
