= Jo Durden-Smith =

British filmmaker and journalist (1941–2007)

- Born: John Anthony Durden-Smith; 24 December 1941; Pinner, Middlesex, England
- Died: 10 May 2007 (aged 65); London, England
- Education: Merton College, Oxford
- Occupations: Filmmaker, author, journalist
- Spouse(s): Diana DeSimone (divorced); Yelena Zagrevskaya (1989–2007, his death)
- Children: 1
- Relatives: Richard Durden (brother); Neil Durden-Smith (half-brother)

Jo Durden-Smith (24 December 1941 – 10 May 2007) was a British documentary film maker, writer and journalist. His film work included The Doors Are Open, The Stones in the Park, Johnny Cash at St Quentin, and, later, television work Russian Godfathers on the Russian oligarchs.

His books included Who Killed George Jackson? (1976), about the death of imprisoned activist George Jackson.

== Life ==
John "Jo" Anthony Durden-Smith was born in Pinner, Middlesex, to parents who were doctors (his father was a surgeon and his mother a radiologist). He was educated at Haileybury and at Merton College, Oxford, where he read Classics. He worked for World in Action, Granada TV's documentary team, where his rock films were made.

Subsequently, he lived in New York, United States, and then in Moscow, Russia. He was a columnist for The Moscow Times until 1997.

His younger brother was the actor Richard Durden and his half-brother was the broadcaster Neil Durden-Smith.

== Books ==
- Who Killed George Jackson? (1976)
- Sex and the Brain (1983) with Diane DeSimone
- Russia: a long-shot romance (1994)
- Mafia (2002)
- 100 most infamous criminals (2003)
- The Essence of Buddhism (2004)
- Nostradamus and Other Prophets and Seers (2005)

== See also ==
- A Horse Called Nijinsky
