= Rick Schmidlin =

American film producer

- Born: October 22, 1954 (age 71); Paterson, New Jersey
- Occupations: producer, director
- Years active: 1982-present

Rick Schmidlin (born October 22, 1954) is a film preservationist and silent film scholar, and a producer-director whose work has focused on restorations, reconstructions and documentaries. Until 2010, he taught for the University of British Columbia in the School of Library, Archival, and Information Studies as an adjunct faculty member. In 2018 Schmidlin was the house manager and programmer of the restored Queen Theatre in Bryan, Texas.

== Films ==
Raised in Maywood, New Jersey, Schmidlin developed a love of film watching movies at a theater in nearby Hackensack.

Schmidlin produced the films The Doors: Live at the Hollywood Bowl and The Doors:The Soft Parade - A Retrospective (1991). In 1986 he was an assistant producer on David Cronenberg's The Fly. He also produced the special edition of the Elvis Presley concert film Elvis: That's the Way It Is.

Schmidlin produced the re-edit of the Erich von Stroheim film Greed, to give a sense of what the original lost version of the film might have been like, and produced the re-edited Orson Welles' film Touch of Evil.

Schmidlin restored (from stills and shooting continuity scripts) the famous lost horror film London After Midnight starring Lon Chaney and directed by Tod Browning. and produced the restoration in 2000 of The Dickson Experimental Sound Film and was selected for inclusion in the National Film Registry. In 2015 Schmidlin produced and restored the lost Houdini film from 1919—The Grim Game— that premiered as the closing film March 29, 2015, at the TCM Classic Film Festival.

== Awards ==
Schmidlin has received the Special Award from the New York Film Critics Circle, a Special Citation from the National Society of Film Critics, and a Special Citation from Los Angeles Film Critics Association for his work on Touch of Evil. For his work reconstructing Greed he, along with Roger Mayer and Turner Classic Movies, received a special citation from the Los Angeles Film Critics Association. In 2001 he received the Rondo Award from the Classic Horror Film Board for London After Midnight that he produced for TCM.
