= The Doors Are Open =

1991 British film by John Sheppard

- Directed by: John Sheppard
- Music by: the Doors
- Country of origin: United Kingdom
- Original language: English

Production
- Producer: Jo Durden-Smith
- Editor: Martin Smith
- Running time: 56 minutes
- Production company: Granada Television

Original release
- Network: Granada TV
- Release: 1968

The Doors Are Open is a 1968 black-and-white documentary about the American rock group the Doors. It was produced by Jo Durden-Smith for Granada TV and directed by John Sheppard and first aired in the United Kingdom on 4 October 1968. The programme combines footage of the Doors playing live at London's Roundhouse venue, interviews with the band members and contemporary news snippets of world current affairs—protests at the 1968 Democratic Convention, French riots, statements from politicians and footage of the Vietnam War etc.

== Production ==
The Doors arrived in England on 3 September 1968 for the start of 17-date European tour (with concerts in London, Frankfurt, Amsterdam, Copenhagen and Stockholm). The day the group arrived they are filmed answering questions as they come through customs at Heathrow airport and also about their music on the drive from the airport to their London hotel, the Royal Lancaster. On 4 September the band are interviewed at the Institute of Contemporary Arts (ICA) in central London. The ICA was hosting an exhibition by Jasia Reichardt called Cybernetic Serendipity.

The group is also filmed being interviewed at Polydor Records office in London and possibly at Jim Morrison's London flat he shared with girlfriend Pamela Courson. On 5 September the group lip-synced to their hit "Hello, I Love You" on Top of the Pops.

The group were booked to play four shows over two days—Friday the 6th and Saturday the 7th—at the Roundhouse in London. Both concerts on the Friday were filmed by Granada's Outside Broadcasting Unit for the television documentary. A soundcheck (which Jim Morrison missed) was also recorded with a rendition of "Hello, I Love You" sung by Ray Manzarek and Robby Krieger performing an instrumental section from Little Red Rooster. The two Friday shows are filmed by four cameras—stage left and right plus a two cameras moving across the front of the stage. However a video problem meant this filming was unusable and so the cameras returned for the shows on the Saturday. The recording of the second set did not begin until one o'clock in the morning following a mammoth two-and-a-half set by the Jefferson Airplane. The band played 17 songs, not all of which featured in the documentary.

The Doors followed Jefferson Airplane on the Friday and then supported them the following day. The documentary utilises only footage from the second Saturday concert. The documentary aired on 4 October 1968.

The final documentary was entitled The Doors Are Open but according to Greg Shaw in his book On The Road, it was originally to be called "When the Mode of the Music Changes, The Walls of the City Will Shake".

== Tracks ==
1. Introduction
2. "When the Music's Over"
3. "Five to One"
4. "Spanish Caravan"
5. The Doors interview
6. "Hello, I Love You" (Soundcheck with Ray Manzarek on vocals)
7. "Back Door Man"
8. Jim Morrison interview
9. "Wake Up!" (Poem from "Celebration of the Lizard")
10. "Light My Fire"
11. "The Unknown Soldier"

== Release ==
Originally aired on Granada TV in October 1968, the documentary was finally released by PolyGram on VHS cassette in 1991. A DVD was released in 1998 and Blu-ray versions followed in 2011.

== Group members ==
- Jim Morrison – vocals
- Ray Manzarek – keyboards/bass
- John Densmore – drums/percussion
- Robby Krieger – guitars
