= London Fog (nightclub) =

1960s nightclub in California, United States

The London Fog
- Screen capture from the film Mondo Bizarro (1966) of the Sunset Strip between Clark and Hilldale showing (from L–R), the Hamburger Hamlet, the London Fog (with a banner clearly displaying house band The Doors' name), Galaxy & Galaxy Overflow, and Whisky a Go Go.
- Interactive map of The London Fog
- Address: 8919 Sunset Blvd
- Location: West Hollywood, California 90069
- Coordinates: 34.09083°N 118.386173°W
- Type: nightclub
- Event: rock and roll

Construction
- Opened: 1965
- Closed: 1966

The London Fog was a 1960s nightclub located on the Sunset Strip in what was then unincorporated Los Angeles County, California (now in the city of West Hollywood). It is most notable for being the venue where The Doors had their first regular gigs for several months in early 1966 before becoming the house band at the nearby Whisky a Go Go.

== History ==
The London Fog was located west of the Whisky a Go Go, a few doors down, at 8919 Sunset Blvd.

In the years after its closure, much confusion has arisen as to what establishments occupied the space of the Fog after it closed. Much of this confusion was due to a counterfeit concert poster depicting the incorrect address.

Both Duke's Coffee Shop and Sneaky Pete's, a former nightclub featuring music, claimed to have replaced the London Fog, but this is not true. They both were in the location that formerly housed "Unicorn Books", a beatnik coffee house directly west of the Whisky a Go Go. In 1966, from west to east, between Hilldale Avenue and North Clark Street, the businesses on that block were The Hamburger Hamlet, Cavalier, The London Fog, The Galaxy, The Galaxy Overflow, Sneaky Pete's and the Whisky a Go Go.

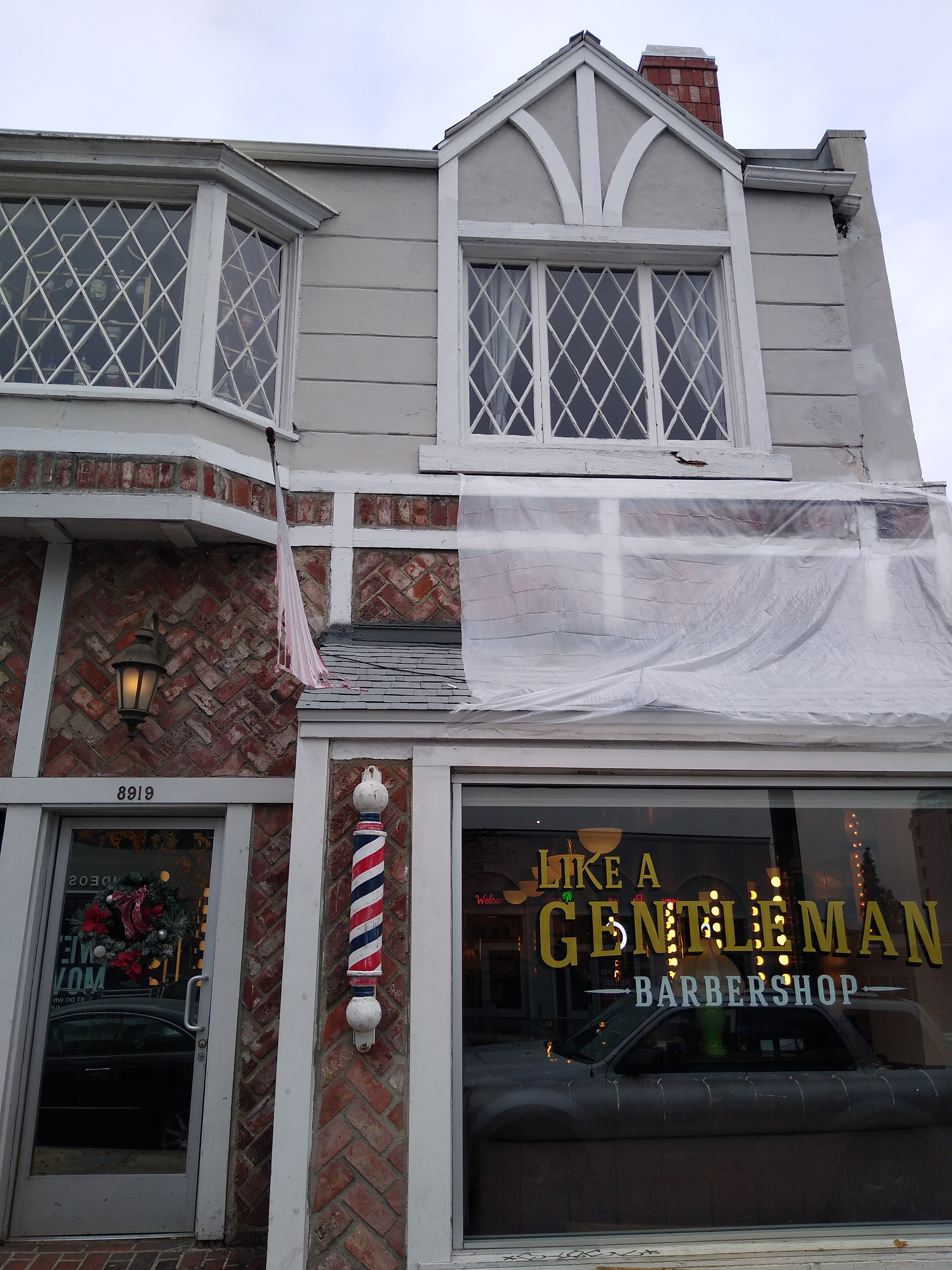
The building in 2019

Today the location is occupied by a barber shop. In 2026, the Linda Lindas performed in the barber shop in a tribute to the history of the location. Video on YouTube

== In popular culture ==
In Oliver Stone's 1991 film The Doors, the scenes depicting the London Fog were shot at the location that became the Viper Room in 1993. It is located one block east on the opposite side of the street.

In the fictional Tarantino Universe, London Fog is still open in 1969, as mentioned by actor/director Sam Wanamaker (played by Nicholas Hammond) in the film Once Upon a Time in Hollywood.
