= The Doors =

American rock band

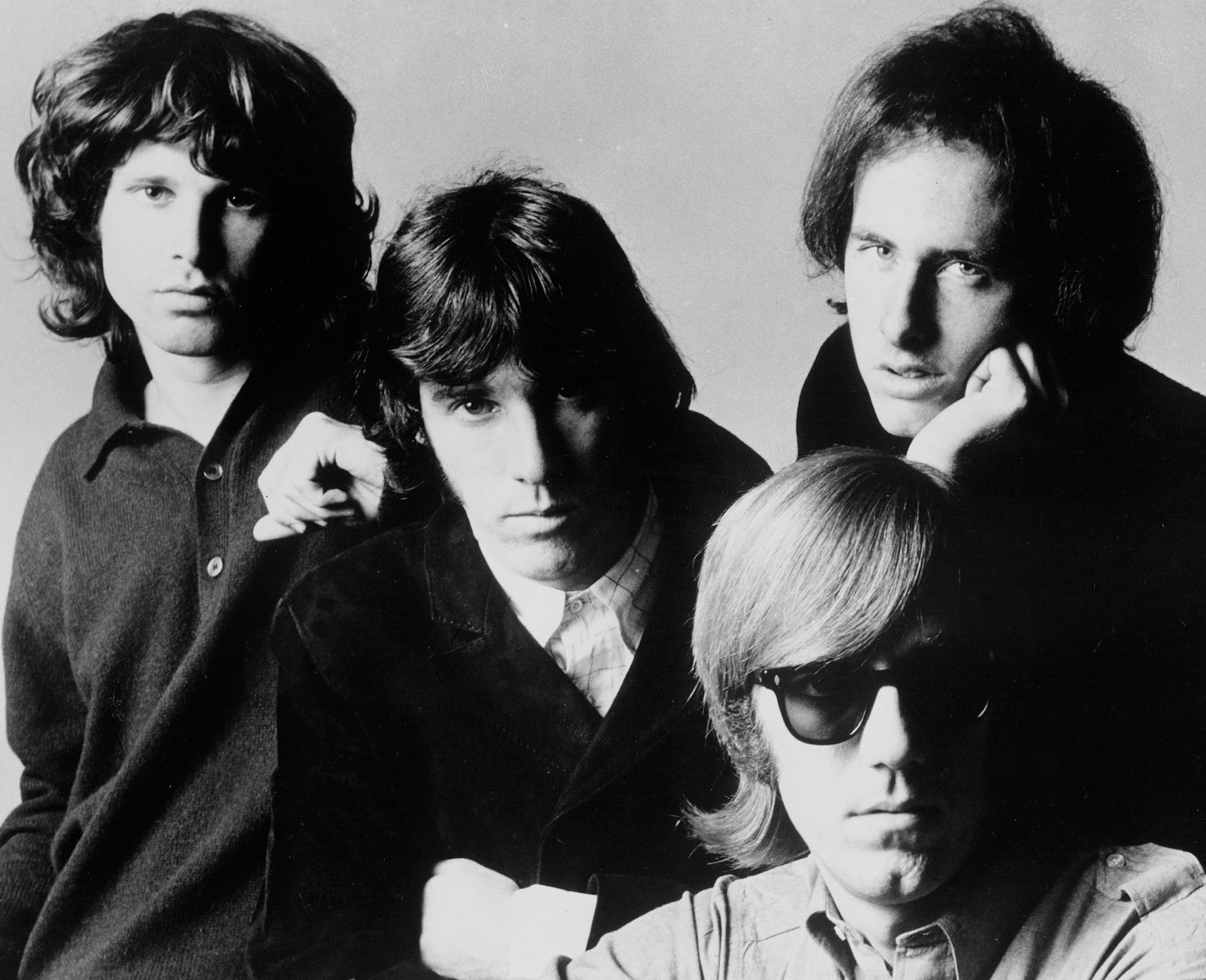
- The Doors in 1966. From left to right: Jim Morrison, John Densmore, Ray Manzarek and Robby Krieger

Background information
- Origin: Los Angeles, California, U.S.
- Genres: Psychedelic rock; blues rock; acid rock
- Works: Discography; songs
- Years active: 1965–1973 (Note: One-off reunions: 1978, 1993, 1997, 2000, 2012, 2013, 2025)
- Labels: Elektra; Rhino
- Spinoffs: The Psychedelic Rangers; Butts Band; Nite City; Manzarek–Krieger
- Spinoff of: Rick & the Ravens
- Past members: Jim Morrison †; Ray Manzarek †; Robby Krieger; John Densmore
- Website: thedoors.com
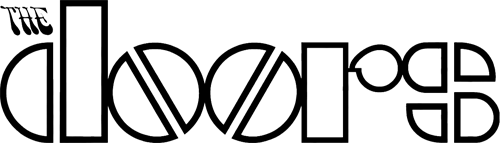

The Doors were an American rock band formed in Los Angeles in 1965, comprising vocalist Jim Morrison, keyboardist Ray Manzarek, guitarist Robby Krieger, and drummer John Densmore. They are considered one of the most innovative, influential, and eclectic rock bands in history, primarily due to their pioneering experimentation with a great variety of musical styles and techniques and Morrison's poetic lyrics and evocative voice. The group is widely cited as a major representative of the era's counterculture.

The band took its name from the title of the English writer Aldous Huxley's book The Doors of Perception, itself a reference to a quote by the English poet William Blake. After signing with Elektra Records in 1966, the Doors with Morrison recorded and released six studio albums in five years, some of which are generally considered among the greatest of all time, including their debut The Doors (1967), Strange Days (1967), Morrison Hotel (1970), and L.A. Woman (1971). Dubbed the "Kings of Acid Rock", they were one of the most successful bands of their time, and by 1972 the Doors had sold over 4 million albums domestically and nearly 8 million singles.

Morrison died in uncertain circumstances in 1971. The band continued as a trio, releasing two more albums until disbanding in 1973. In 1978, they reformed for the album An American Prayer, which combined new music with Morrison's recitings of his poetry recorded in 1969 and 1970. They reunited again briefly in 1993 when they were inducted into the Rock and Roll Hall of Fame, and for several one-off projects in the 21st century. In 2002, Manzarek, Krieger, and Ian Astbury of the Cult on vocals started performing as "The Doors of the 21st Century". Densmore and the Morrison estate successfully sued them over the use of the band's name. After a short time as Riders on the Storm, they settled on the name Manzarek–Krieger and toured until Manzarek died in 2013.

The Doors were the first American band to accumulate eight consecutive Recording Industry Association of America (RIAA)-certified Gold and Platinum LPs. (Note: The official DVD Dance on Fire features in the credits of the song "Riders on the Storm": "They would become the first American band to accumulate eight consecutive gold and platinum LPs.") According to the RIAA, they have 50 millioncertified records sold in the US and over 100 million records worldwide, making them one of the best-selling bands of all time. The Doors have been listed as one of the greatest artists of all time by magazines including Rolling Stone, which ranked them 41st on its list of the "100 Greatest Artists of All Time".

== History ==
=== Origins (July 1965 – August 1966) ===
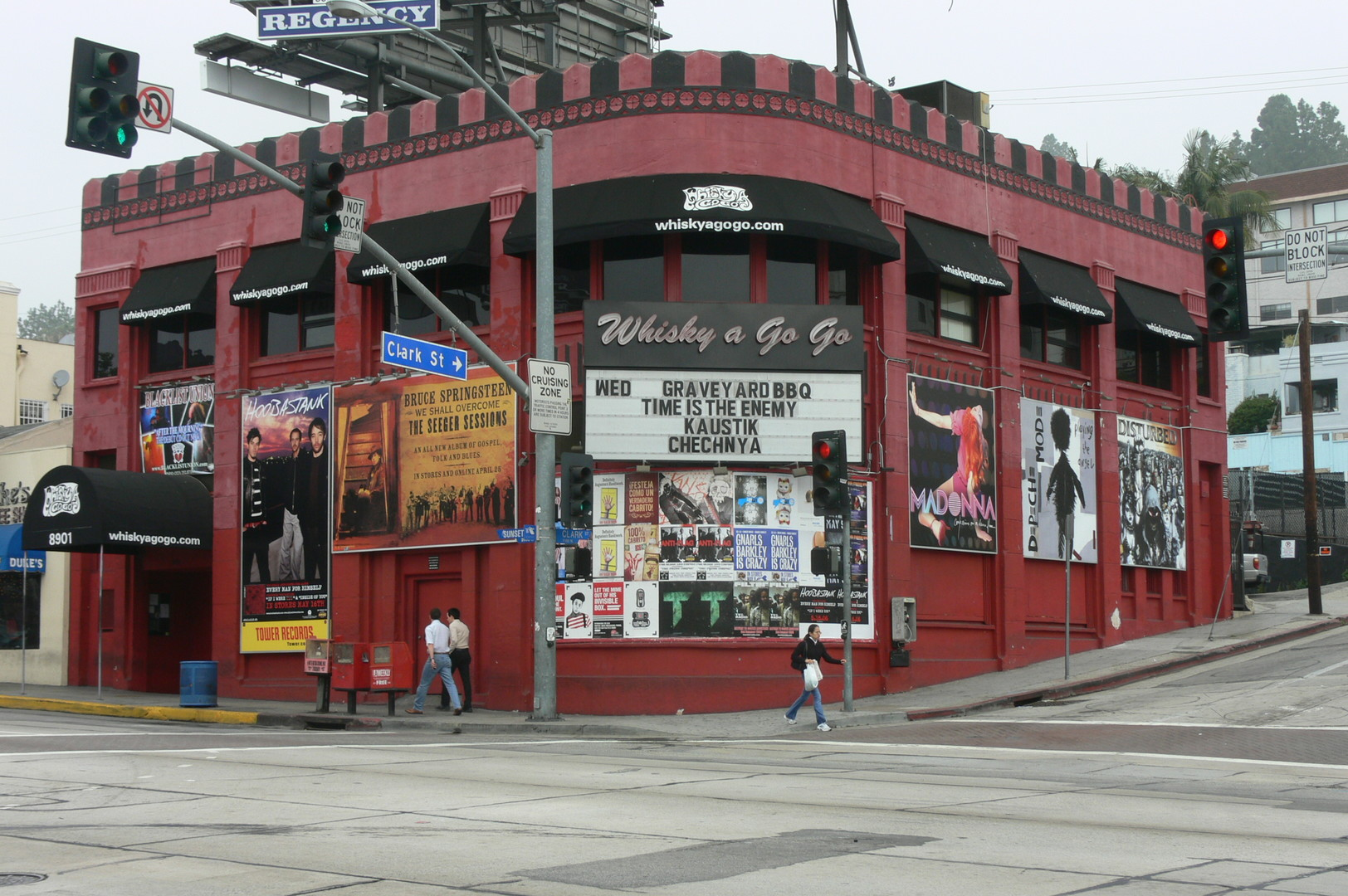
Whisky a Go Go

The Doors began with a chance meeting between acquaintances Jim Morrison and Ray Manzarek on the beach in Santa Monica, in front of Ray's house on Fraser Avenue in July 1965. They recognized each other as they had both attended the UCLA School of Theater, Film and Television. Morrison confided in Manzarek that he had been writing songs. As Morrison would later relate to Jerry Hopkins in Rolling Stone, "Those first five or six songs I wrote, I was just taking notes at a fantastic rock concert that was going on inside my head. And once I'd written the songs, I had to sing them." With Manzarek's encouragement, Morrison sang the opening words of "Moonlight Drive": "Let's swim to the moon, let's climb through the tide, penetrate the evening that the city sleeps to hide." Manzarek was inspired, thinking of all the music he could play to accompany these "cool and spooky" lyrics.

Manzarek was then in an unsuccessful band called Rick & the Ravens with his brothers Rick and Jim, while drummer John Densmore was playing with the Psychedelic Rangers and knew Manzarek from meditation classes. Densmore joined the group later in August 1965. Together, they combined varied musical backgrounds, from jazz, rock, blues, classical and folk music idioms. The five, along with bass player Patty Sullivan, (Note: Patty Sullivan was later credited using her married name Patricia Hansen in the Doors' 1997 Box Set CD release.) and now christened the Doors, recorded a six-song demo on September 2, 1965, at World Pacific Studios in Los Angeles. (Note: These recordings were officially available much later in October 1997, on the Doors' Box Set CD release. This has circulated widely since then as a bootleg recording.) The band took their name from the title of Aldous Huxley's book The Doors of Perception, itself derived from a line in William Blake's The Marriage of Heaven and Hell: "If the doors of perception were cleansed, everything would appear to man as it is: infinite". In late 1965, after Manzarek's two brothers left, guitarist Robby Krieger joined.

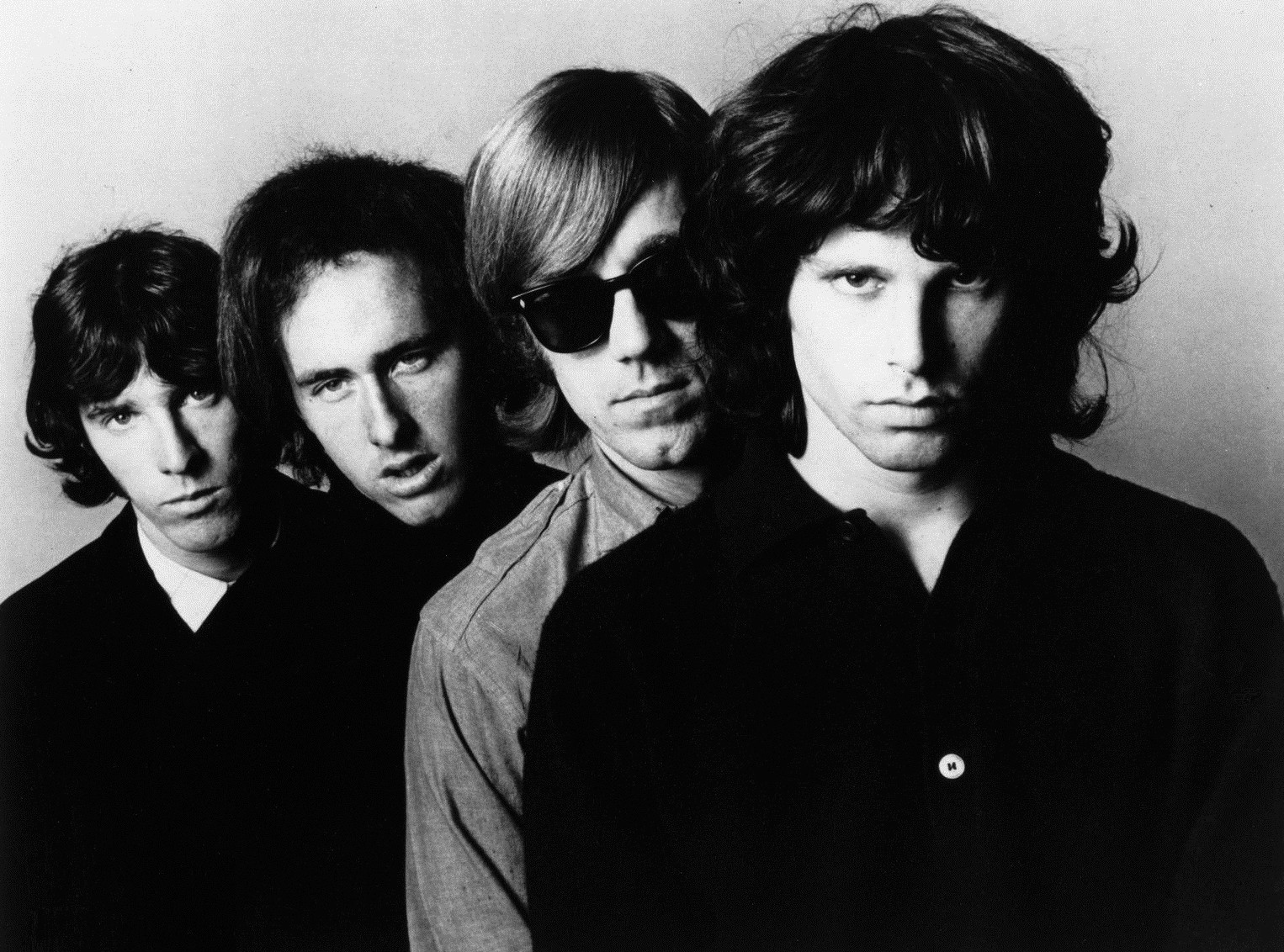
The Doors in 1966

From February to May 1966, the group had a residency at the "rundown" and "sleazy" Los Angeles club London Fog, appearing on the bill with "Rhonda Lane Exotic Dancer". The experience gave Morrison confidence to perform in front of a live audience, and the band as a whole to develop and, in some cases, lengthen their songs and work "The End" and "Light My Fire" into the pieces that would appear on their debut album. Manzarek later said that at the London Fog the band "became this collective entity, this unit of oneness ... that is where the magic began to happen." The group soon graduated to the more esteemed Whisky a Go Go after being booked by Ronnie Haran, where they were the house band (starting from May 1966), supporting acts, including Van Morrison's group Them. On their last night together the two bands joined up for "In the Midnight Hour" and a twenty-minute jam session of "Gloria".

On August 10, 1966, they were spotted by Elektra Records president Jac Holzman, who was present at the recommendation of Love singer Arthur Lee, whose group was with Elektra Records. After Holzman and producer Paul A. Rothchild saw two sets of the band playing at the Whisky a Go Go, they signed them to the Elektra Records label on August 18 — the start of a long and successful partnership with Rothchild and sound engineer Bruce Botnick. The Doors were fired from the Whisky on August 21, 1966, when Morrison added an explicit retelling and profanity-laden version of the Greek myth of Oedipus during "The End".

=== The Doors and Strange Days (August 1966 – December 1967) ===
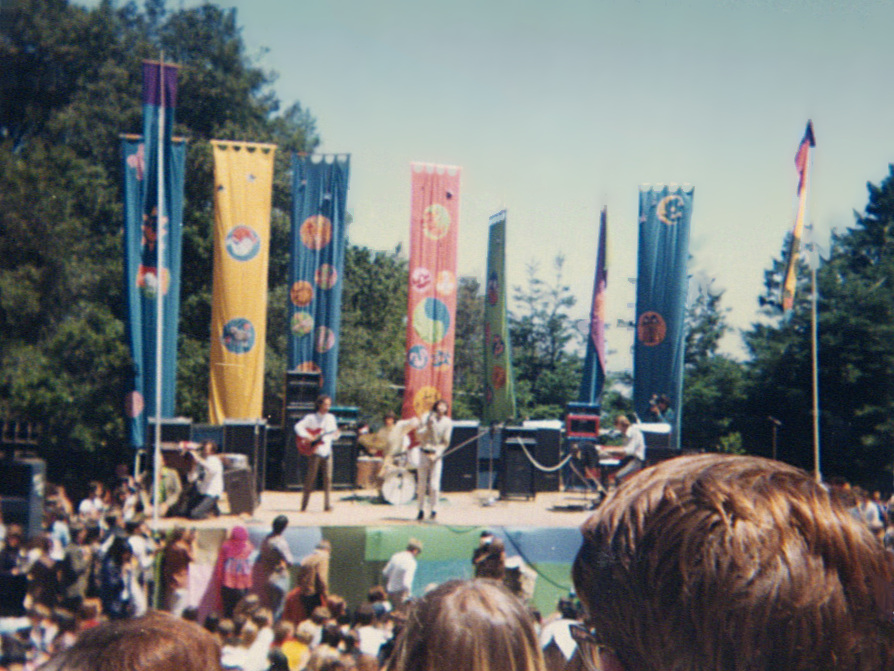
The Doors performing at Fantasy Fair and Magic Mountain Music Festival in 1967

The Doors recorded their self-titled debut album around August 1966, at Sunset Sound Studios. The record was officially released in the first week of January 1967. It included the nearly 12-minute musical drama "The End". In November 1966, Mark Abramson directed a promotional film for the lead single "Break On Through (To the Other Side)". The group also made several television appearances, such as on Shebang, a Los Angeles television show, miming to a playback of "Break On Through". (Note: This was either New Year's Day 1967, or March 6, 1967.) In early 1967, the group appeared on The Clay Cole Show (which aired on Saturday evenings at 6 p.m. on WPIX Channel 11 out of New York City) where they performed their single "Break On Through". Since the single achieved only minor recognition, the band turned to "Light My Fire"; it became the first single from Elektra Records to reach number one on the Billboard Hot 100 singles chart, selling over one million copies.

From March 7 to 11, 1967, the Doors performed at the Matrix Club in San Francisco. The March 7 and 10 shows were recorded by Peter Abram, co-owner of the Matrix. These recordings are notable as they are among the earliest live recordings of the band to circulate. On November 18, 2008, the Doors published a compilation of these recordings, Live at the Matrix 1967, on the band's boutique Bright Midnight Archives label.

The Doors made their international television debut on May 18, 1967, performing a live version of "The End" for the Canadian Broadcasting Corporation (CBC) at their Parliament Street Colour Studio in Toronto. It was recorded in September when they were in Toronto and transmitted on the show O'Keefe Centre Presents. The misconception that it was at the O'Keefe Centre stems mostly from the title, as the venue shown in the video has a dance floor, which the Centre did not have. But after its initial broadcasts, the performance remained unreleased except in bootleg form until the release of The Doors Soundstage Performances DVD in 2002.

On September 17, 1967, the Doors gave a memorable performance of "Light My Fire" on The Ed Sullivan Show in New York City. According to Manzarek, CBS network executives asked that the word "higher" be removed, due to a possible reference to drug use. The group appeared to acquiesce, but performed the song in its original form, because either they had never intended to comply with the request or Jim Morrison was nervous and forgot to make the change (the group has given conflicting accounts). Either way, "higher" was sung out on national television, and the show's host, Ed Sullivan, canceled another six shows that had been planned. After the program's producer told the band they would never perform on the show again, Morrison reportedly replied: "Hey man. We just did the Sullivan Show."

On December 24, the Doors performed "Moonlight Drive" and "Light My Fire" live for The Jonathan Winters Show. Their performance was taped for later broadcast. From December 26 to 28, the group played at the Winterland Ballroom in San Francisco.

The Doors spent several weeks in Sunset Studios in Los Angeles recording their second album, Strange Days, experimenting with the new technology, notably the Moog synthesizer they now had available, and musique concréte techniques. The commercial success of Strange Days was middling, peaking at number three on the Billboard album chart but quickly dropping, along with a series of underperforming singles. The chorus from the album's single "People Are Strange" inspired the name of the 2009 documentary of the Doors, When You're Strange.

Session musician Larry Knechtel contributed some bass parts on the band's debut album. But Strange Days was the first Doors album recorded with a studio bassist on most of the record, and this continued on all subsequent studio albums. Manzarek explained that his keyboard bass was well-suited for live situations, but that it lacked the "articulation" needed for studio recording. Douglas Lubahn played on Strange Days and the next two albums; but the band used several other musicians for this role, often using more than one bassist on the same album. Kerry Magness, Leroy Vinnegar, Harvey Brooks, Ray Neopolitan, Lonnie Mack, Jerry Scheff, Jack Conrad (who played a major role in the post Morrison years touring with the group in 1971 and 1972), Chris Ethridge, Charles Larkey and Leland Sklar are credited as bassists who worked with the band.

=== New Haven incident (December 1967) ===
Morrison's mugshot taken on December 10, 1967, in New Haven

On December 9, 1967, the Doors performed a now-infamous concert at New Haven Arena in New Haven, Connecticut, which ended abruptly when Morrison was arrested by local police. Morrison became the first rock artist to be arrested onstage during a live performance. Prior to the start of the concert, Morrison was having a private conversation with a female fan backstage in a bathroom shower stall when a police officer happened upon them. Unaware that he was the lead singer of the band, the officer told Morrison and the fan to leave, to which Morrison said, "Eat it." The policeman took out a can of mace and warned Morrison, "Last chance", to which Morrison replied, "Last chance to eat it." There is some discrepancy as to what happened next: according to No One Here Gets Out Alive, the fan ran away and Morrison was maced; but Manzarek recounts in his book that both Morrison and the fan were sprayed.

The Doors' main act was delayed for an hour while Morrison recovered, after which the band took the stage very late. According to music journalist Gillian G. Gaar, the police still did not consider the issue resolved and wanted to charge him. Halfway through the first set, Morrison proceeded to create an improvised song about his experience with the "little man in blue". It was an obscenity-laced account to the audience, describing what had happened backstage and taunting the police, who were surrounding the stage. Later, the police lieutenant approached Morrison, during which Morrison thrust the microphone against his mouth and remarked, "Say your thing, man." The concert came to an abrupt end when Morrison was dragged from the stage by the police. The audience, already restless from waiting so long for the band to perform, became unruly. Morrison was taken to a local police station, photographed and booked on charges of inciting a riot, indecency and public obscenity. Charges against Morrison, as well as those against three journalists also arrested in the incident (Mike Zwerin, Yvonne Chabrier and Tim Page), were dropped several weeks later for lack of evidence.

=== Waiting for the Sun (April–December 1968) ===
Recording of the group's third album in April 1968 was marred by tension as a result of Morrison's increasing dependence on alcohol and the rejection of the 17-minute "Celebration of the Lizard" by band producer Paul Rothchild, who considered the work too experimental. Approaching the height of their popularity, the Doors played a series of outdoor shows that led to frenzied scenes between fans and police, particularly at Chicago Coliseum on May 10.

The band began to branch out from their initial form for this third LP, and began writing new material. Waiting for the Sun became their first and only album to reach number 1 on the US charts, and the single "Hello, I Love You" (one of the six songs performed by the band on their 1965 Aura Records demo) was their second US No. 1 single. Following the 1968 release of "Hello, I Love You", the publisher of the Kinks' 1964 hit "All Day and All of the Night" announced they were planning legal action against the Doors for copyright infringement; however, songwriter Ray Davies ultimately chose not to sue. (Note: However, some have suggested that the court in the United Kingdom determined in favor of Davies and any royalties for the song are paid to him.) Kinks guitarist Dave Davies was particularly irritated by the similarity. In concert, Morrison was occasionally dismissive of the song, leaving the vocals to Manzarek, as can be seen in the documentary The Doors Are Open.

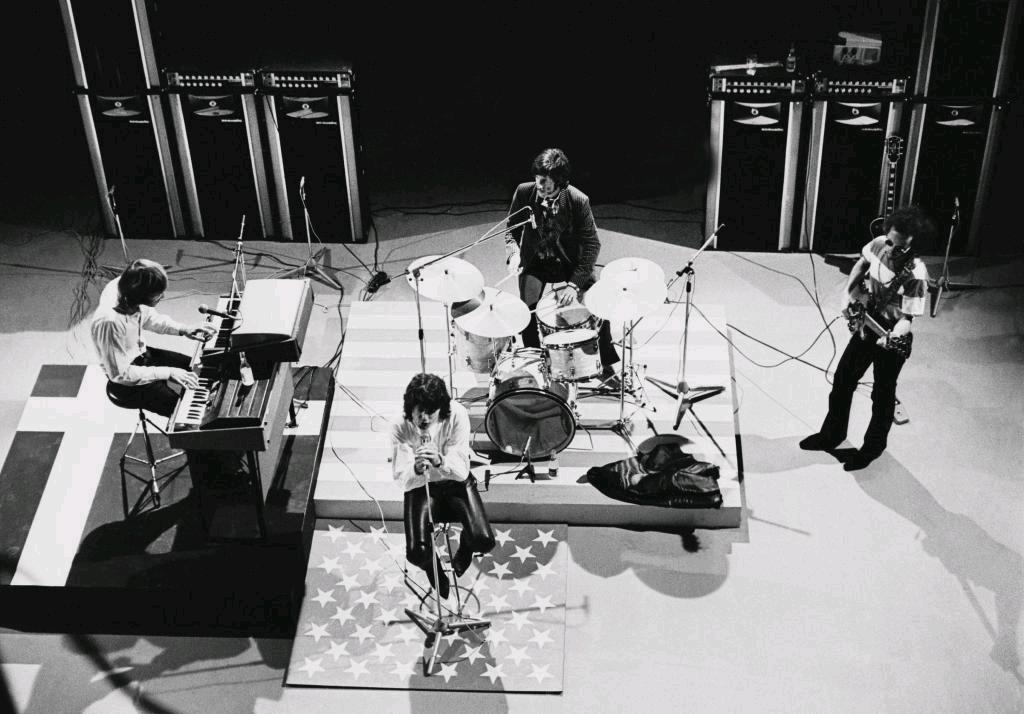
The Doors performing in Denmark in 1968

A month after a riotous concert at the Singer Bowl in New York City, the group flew to Great Britain for their first performance outside North America. They held a press conference at the ICA Gallery in London and played shows at the Roundhouse. The results of the trip were broadcast on Granada TV's The Doors Are Open, later released on video. They played dates in Europe, along with Jefferson Airplane, including a show in Amsterdam where Morrison collapsed on stage after a drug binge (including marijuana, hashish and unspecified pills).

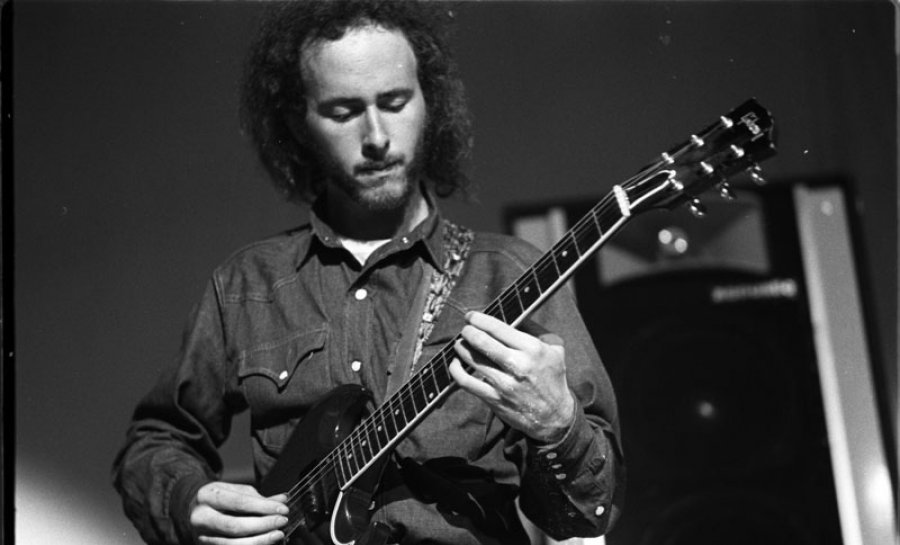
Robby Krieger at the Roundhouse in London (1968).

The group flew back to the United States and played nine more dates before returning to work in November on their fourth LP. They ended the year with a successful new single, "Touch Me" (released in December 1968), which reached No. 3 on the Billboard Hot 100 and No. 1 in the Cashbox Top 100 in early 1969; this was the group's third and last American number-one single.

=== Miami incident (March 1969) ===
On March 1, 1969, at the Dinner Key Auditorium in the Coconut Grove neighborhood of Miami, Florida, the Doors gave the most controversial and consequential performance of their career, one that nearly "derailed the band". The auditorium was a converted seaplane hangar that had no air conditioning on that hot night, and the seats had been removed by the promoter to boost ticket sales.

Morrison had been drinking all day and had missed connecting flights to Miami. By the time he arrived, drunk, the concert was over an hour late. The restless crowd of 12,000, packed into a facility designed to hold 7,000, was subjected to undue silences in Morrison's singing, which strained the music from the beginning of the performance. Morrison had recently attended a play by an experimental acting company the Living Theatre and was inspired by their "antagonistic" style of performance art. Morrison taunted the crowd with messages of both love and hate, saying, "Love me. I can't take it no more without no good love. I want some lovin'. Ain't nobody gonna love my ass?" and alternately, "You're all a bunch of fuckin' idiots!" and "You’re all a bunch of slaves!" while screaming "What are you gonna do about it?" over and over again.

As the band began their second song, "Touch Me", Morrison started shouting in protest, forcing the band to a halt. At one point, Morrison removed the hat of an onstage police officer and threw it into the crowd; the officer reacted by taking Morrison's hat and throwing it in the same direction. Manager Bill Siddons recalled, "The gig was a bizarre, circus-like thing, there was this guy carrying a sheep and the wildest people that I'd ever seen." Equipment chief Vince Treanor said, "Somebody jumped up and poured champagne on Jim so he took his shirt off, he was soaking wet. 'Let's see a little skin, let's get naked,' he said, and the audience started taking their clothes off." Having removed his shirt, Morrison held it in front of his groin area and started to make hand movements behind it. Manzarek described the incident as a mass "religious hallucination".

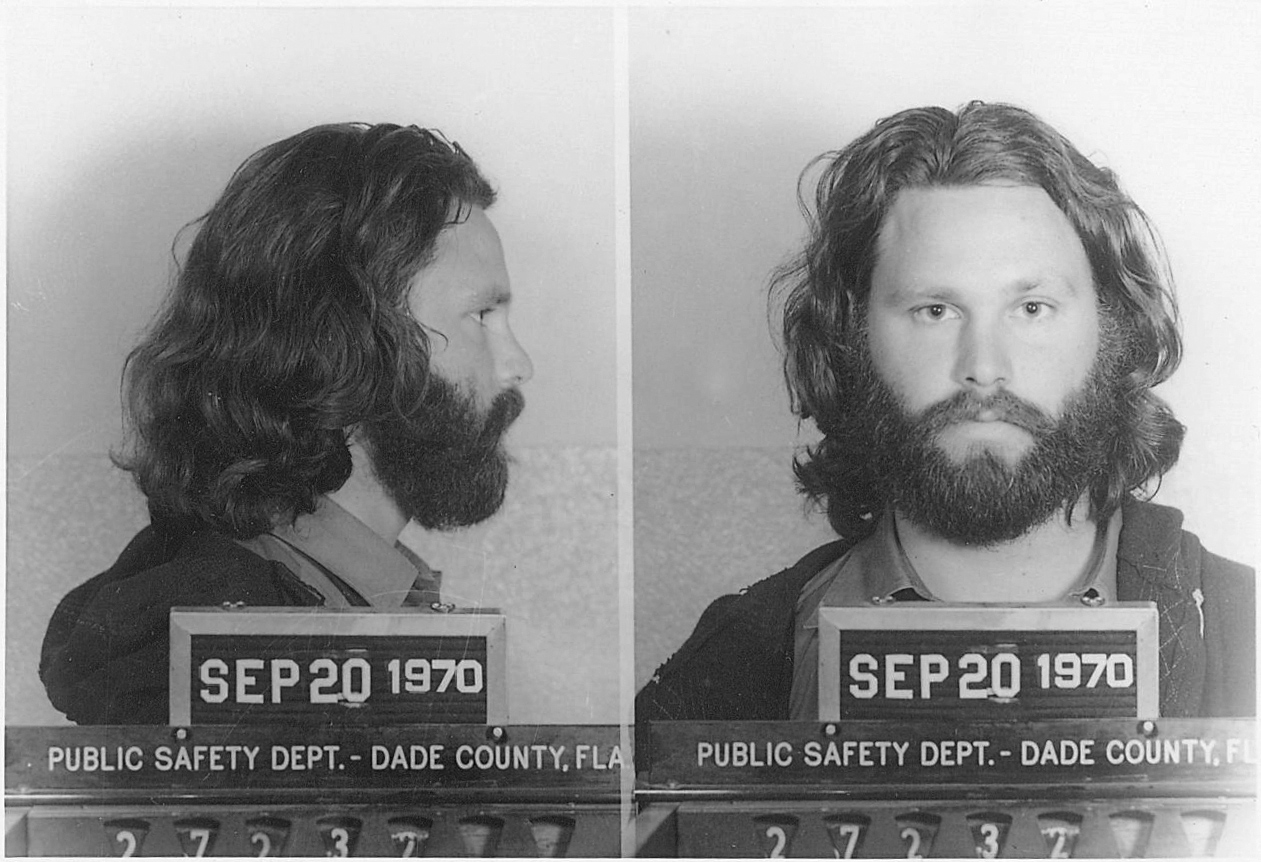
Jim Morrison on September 20, 1970, the day of his conviction in Miami for profanity and indecent exposure

On March 5, the Dade County Sheriff's office issued a warrant for Morrison's arrest, claiming Morrison had exposed his penis while on stage, shouted obscenities to the crowd, simulated oral sex on Krieger, and was drunk at the time of his performance. Morrison turned down a plea bargain that required the Doors to perform a free Miami concert. He was convicted and sentenced to six months in jail with hard labor, and ordered to pay a $500 fine. Morrison remained free, pending an appeal of his conviction, and died before the matter was legally resolved. In 2007, Florida Governor Charlie Crist suggested the possibility of a posthumous pardon for Morrison, which was announced as successful on December 9, 2010. Densmore, Krieger and Manzarek have denied the allegation that Morrison exposed himself on stage that night.

=== The Soft Parade (May–July 1969) ===
Morrison, who was increasingly distancing himself from the music, announced to the other Doors members his intention to quit the group; Manzarek convinced him to stay for six more months, ahead of completing The Soft Parade, the Doors' forthcoming album.

Released in July 1969, The Soft Parade was their first-and-only to feature brass and string arrangements. The concept was suggested by Rothchild to the band, after listening to many examples by various groups who also explored the same radical departure. Both jazz-influenced Densmore and Manzarek agreed with the recommendation, but Morrison declined to incorporate orchestral accompaniment on his compositions. The lead single, "Touch Me", featured saxophonist Curtis Amy.

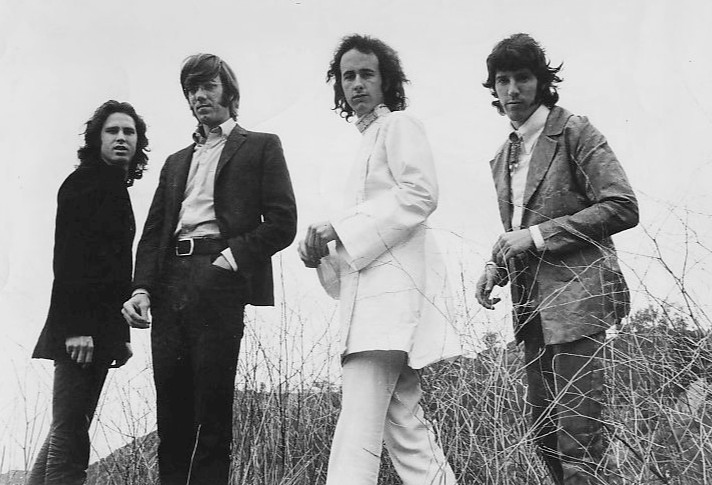
The Doors c. 1968

While the band was trying faintly to maintain their previous momentum, efforts to expand their sound with instrumental changes, including string, brass, and wind parts, caused critics to attack their musical integrity. According to Densmore in his biography Riders on the Storm, individual writing credits were noted for the first time because of Morrison's reluctance to sing the lyrics of Krieger's song "Tell All the People". Morrison's drinking made him difficult and unreliable, and the recording sessions dragged on for months. Studio costs piled up, and the Doors came close to disintegrating. Despite all this, the album was immensely successful, becoming the band's fourth hit album.

=== Morrison Hotel and Absolutely Live (November 1969 – December 1970) ===
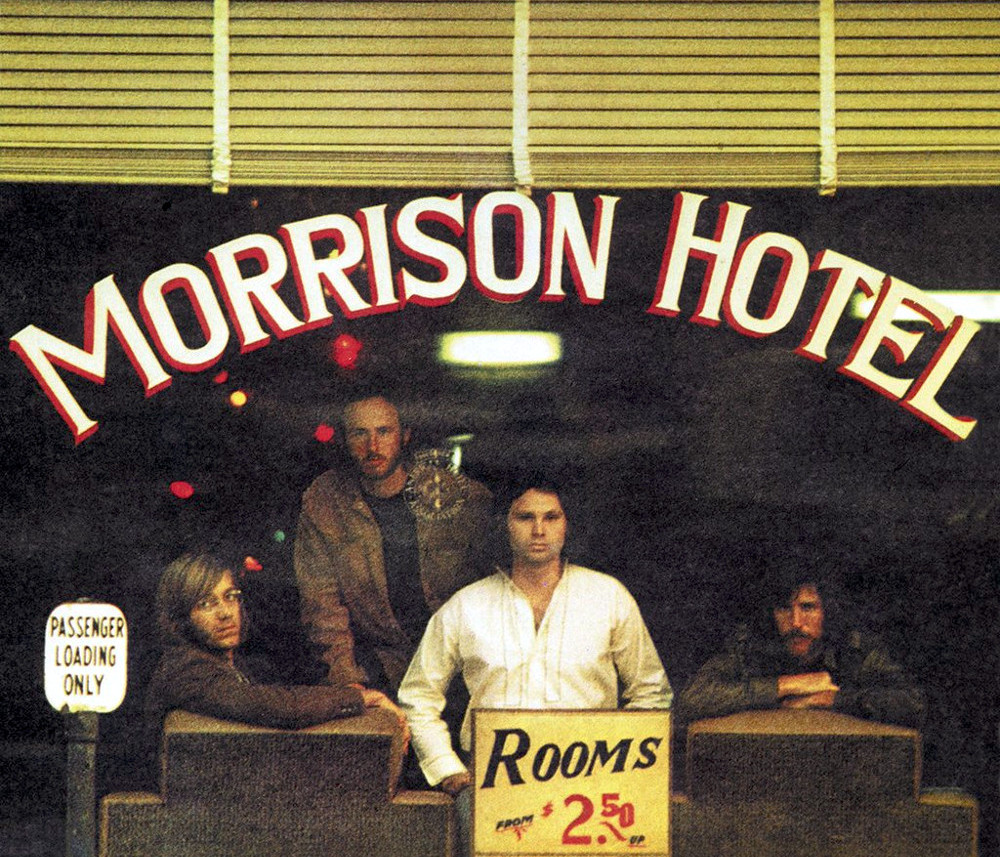
Photo by Henry Diltz used on the cover of Morrison Hotel

During the recording of their next album, Morrison Hotel, in November 1969, Morrison again found himself in trouble with the law after harassing airline staff during a flight to Phoenix, Arizona to see the Rolling Stones in concert. Both Morrison and his friend and traveling companion Tom Baker were charged with "interfering with the flight of an intercontinental aircraft and public drunkenness". If convicted of the most serious charge, Morrison could have faced a ten-year federal prison sentence for the incident. The charges were dropped in April 1970 after an airline stewardess reversed her testimony to say she mistakenly identified Morrison as Baker.

The Doors staged a return to a more conventional direction after the experimental The Soft Parade, with their fifth LP Morrison Hotel in 1970. Featuring a consistent blues rock sound, the album's opener was "Roadhouse Blues". The record reached No. 4 in the United States and revived their status among their core fanbase and the rock press. Dave Marsh, the editor of Creem magazine, said of the album: "the most horrifying rock and roll I have ever heard. When they're good, they're simply unbeatable. I know this is the best record I've listened to ... so far". Rock Magazine called it "without any doubt their ballsiest (and best) album to date". Circus magazine praised it as "possibly the best album yet from the Doors" and "good hard, evil rock, and one of the best albums released this decade". The album also saw Morrison returning as main songwriter, writing or co-writing all of the album's tracks. The 40th anniversary CD reissue of Morrison Hotel contains outtakes and alternative takes, including different versions of "The Spy" and "Roadhouse Blues" (with Lonnie Mack on bass guitar and the Lovin' Spoonful's John Sebastian on harmonica).

July 1970 saw the release of the group's first live album, Absolutely Live, which peaked at the No. 8 position on the charts. The record was completed by producer Rothchild, who confirmed that the album's final mixing consisted of many bits and pieces from various and different band concerts. "There must be 2000 edits on that album", he told an interviewer years later. Absolutely Live also marked the first release of the lengthy piece "Celebration of the Lizard".

Although the Doors continued to face de facto bans in more conservative American markets and earned new bans at Salt Lake City's Salt Palace and Detroit's Cobo Hall following tumultuous concerts, the band managed to play 18 concerts in the United States, Mexico and Canada following the Miami incident in 1969, and 23 dates in the United States and Canada throughout the first half of 1970. The group later made it to the Isle of Wight Festival on August 29; performing on the same day as John Sebastian, Shawn Phillips, Lighthouse, Joni Mitchell, Tiny Tim, Miles Davis, Ten Years After, Emerson, Lake & Palmer, the Who, Sly and the Family Stone and Melanie; the performance was the last captured on the band's Roadhouse Blues Tour.

On December 8, 1970, his 27th birthday, Morrison recorded another poetry session. Part of this would end up on An American Prayer in 1978 with music, and is currently in the possession of the Courson family. Shortly thereafter, a new tour to promote their upcoming album would comprise only three dates. Two concerts were held in Dallas on December 11. During the Doors' last public performance with Morrison, at The Warehouse in New Orleans, on December 12, 1970, Morrison apparently had a breakdown on stage. Midway through the set he slammed the microphone numerous times into the stage floor until the platform beneath was destroyed, then sat down and refused to perform for the remainder of the show. After the concert, Densmore, Manzarek and Krieger came to a mutual agreement that they should end their live act, claiming Morrison was ready to retire from performing.

=== L.A. Woman and Morrison's leave of absence and death (December 1970 – July 1971) ===
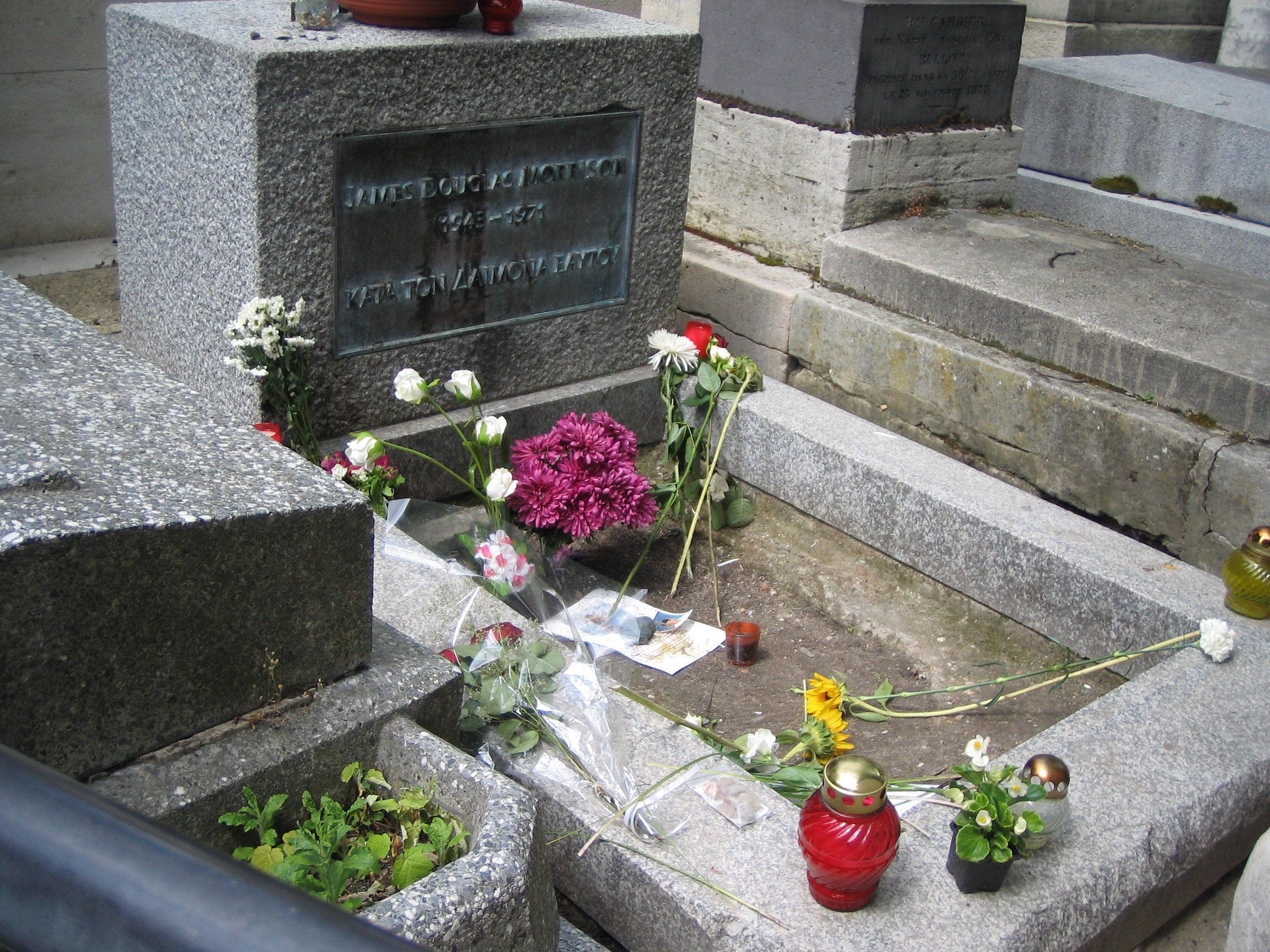
Jim Morrison's grave at the Père Lachaise Cemetery in Paris

Despite Morrison's conviction and the fallout from their appearance in New Orleans, the Doors set out to reclaim their status as a premier act with the album L.A. Woman, recorded in Los Angeles in 1971. The album included rhythm guitarist Marc Benno on several tracks and prominently featured bassist Jerry Scheff, best known for his work in Elvis Presley's TCB Band. Despite a comparatively low Billboard chart peak at No. 9, L.A. Woman contained two Top 20 hits and went on to be their second bestselling studio album, surpassed in sales only by their debut. The album explored their R&B roots, although during rehearsals they had a falling-out with Paul Rothchild, who was dissatisfied with the band's effort. Denouncing "Love Her Madly" as "cocktail lounge music", he quit and handed the production to Bruce Botnick and the Doors.

The title track and two singles ("Love Her Madly" and "Riders on the Storm") remain mainstays of rock radio programming, with the latter being inducted into the Grammy Hall of Fame for its special significance to recorded music. In the song "L.A. Woman", Morrison makes an anagram of his name to chant "Mr. Mojo Risin". During the sessions, a short clip of the band performing "Crawling King Snake" was filmed. As far as is known, this is the last clip of the Doors performing with Morrison.

On March 11, 1971, near the end of the mixing of L.A. Woman, Morrison took a leave of absence from the Doors and moved to Paris with Pamela Courson; he had visited the city the previous summer. On July 3, 1971, following months of residency, Morrison was found dead in the bath by Courson. Despite the absence of an official autopsy, the cause of death was listed as heart failure. He was buried in the "Poets' Corner" of Père Lachaise Cemetery on July 7.

Morrison died at age 27, the same age as several other famous rock stars in the 27 Club. In 1974, Morrison's girlfriend Pamela Courson also died at the age of 27.

== After Morrison ==
=== Other Voices and Full Circle (July 1971 – January 1973) ===
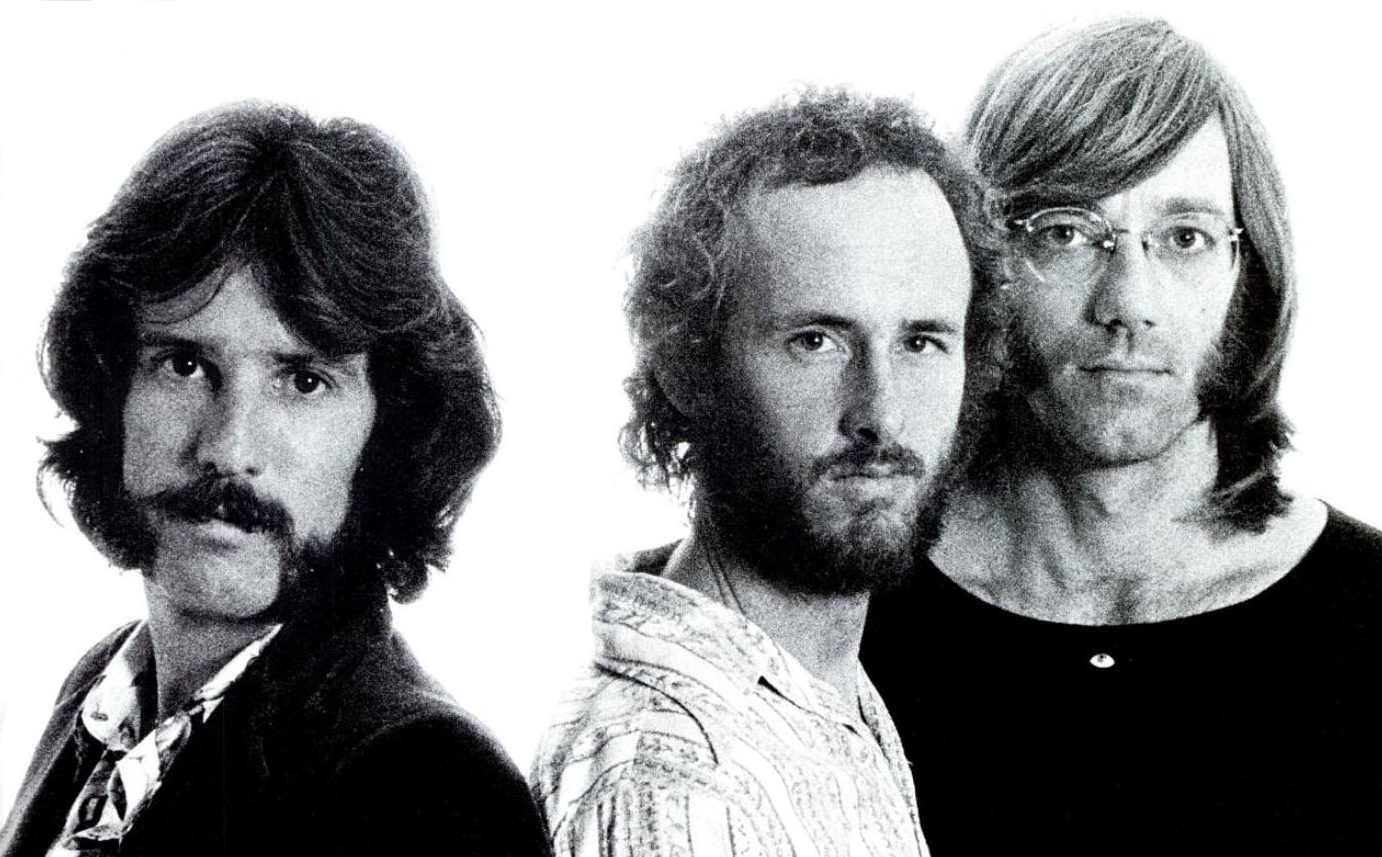
Densmore, Krieger and Manzarek in 1971

Morrison's passing stamped the Doors with a seal of legend and immortality. There was no opportunity for the band to go into the seventies intact. Perhaps that's a good thing. I can't imagine the Doors in the era of disco.

— Henry Rollins

The recording of L.A. Woman's follow up album Other Voices began while Morrison was in Paris. The band assumed he would return to help them finish the album. After Morrison died, the surviving members considered replacing him with several new people, such as Iggy Pop on vocals. But since this did not work out, Krieger and Manzarek took over lead vocal duties themselves. Other Voices was finally completed in August 1971, and released in October 1971. The record featured the single "Tightrope Ride", which received some radio airplay. The trio began performing again with additional supporting members on November 12, 1971, at Pershing Municipal Auditorium in Lincoln, Nebraska, followed by shows at Carnegie Hall on November 23, and the Hollywood Palladium on November 26.

The recordings for Full Circle took place a year after Other Voices during the spring of 1972, and the album was released in August 1972. For the tours during this period, the Doors enlisted Jack Conrad on bass (who had played on several tracks on both Other Voices and Full Circle) as well as Bobby Ray Henson on rhythm guitar. They began a European tour covering France, Germany, the Netherlands, and the United Kingdom, including an appearance on the German show Beat-Club. Like Other Voices, Full Circle did not perform as well commercially as their previous albums. While Full Circle was notable for adding elements of funk and jazz to the usual Doors sound, the band struggled with Manzarek and Krieger leading (neither of the post-Morrison albums had reached the Top 10 while all six of their albums with Morrison had). Once their contract with Elektra had lapsed, the Doors disbanded in 1973.

=== Reunions ===
The third post-Morrison album, An American Prayer, was released in 1978. It consisted of the band adding musical backing tracks to previously recorded spoken word performances of Morrison reciting his poetry. The record was a commercial success, acquiring a platinum certificate. Two years later, it was nominated for a Grammy Award in the "Spoken Word Album" category, but it ultimately lost to John Gielgud's The Ages of Man. An American Prayer was re-mastered and re-released with bonus tracks in 1995.

In 1993, the Doors were inducted into the Rock and Roll Hall of Fame. In the ceremony, Manzarek, Krieger and Densmore reunited to perform "Roadhouse Blues", "Break On Through" and "Light My Fire". Eddie Vedder filled in on lead vocals, while Don Was played bass. For the 1997 boxed set, the surviving members of the Doors reconvened to complete "Orange County Suite". The track was based on one that Morrison had written and recorded in early 1969, providing both vocals and piano.

The Doors reunited at the turn of the century to record music for the Stoned Immaculate: The Music of The Doors tribute album. Following the sessions, band members reunited in 2000 to perform on VH1 Storytellers. For the live performance, the band was joined by Angelo Barbera and numerous guest vocalists, including Perry Farrell of Jane's Addiction, Pat Monahan, Ian Astbury of the Cult, Travis Meeks, Scott Weiland of Stone Temple Pilots, and Scott Stapp of Creed. On May 29, 2007, Perry Farrell's group the Satellite Party released its first album Ultra Payloaded on Columbia Records. It featured "Woman in the Window", a new song with a pre-recorded vocal performance by Morrison.

Manzarek along with Krieger, Densmore and DJ/producer Skrillex (Sonny Moore) recorded a new song in 2012, of which Manzarek said, "I like to say this is the first new Doors track of the 21st century". The recording session and song are part of a documentary film, Re:Generation, which recruited five popular DJs/producers to work with artists from five separate genres and had them record new music. Manzarek and Skrillex had an immediate musical connection: "Sonny plays his beat, all he had to do was play the one thing. I listened to it and I said, 'Holy shit, that's strong'." Manzarek formulates, "Basically, it's a variation on 'Milestones', by Miles Davis, and if I do say so myself, sounds fucking great, hot as hell." The track, called "Breakn' a Sweat", was recorded for Skrillex's EP Bangarang.

In 2013, the remaining members of the Doors recorded with rapper Tech N9ne for the song "Strange 2013", appearing on his album Something Else, which features new instrumentation by the band and samples of Morrison's vocals from the song "Strange Days". In their final collaboration before Manzarek's death, the three surviving Doors provided backing for poet Michael C. Ford's album Look Each Other in the Ears.

On February 12, 2016, at The Fonda Theatre in Hollywood, Densmore and Krieger reunited for the first time in 15 years to perform in tribute to Manzarek and benefit Stand Up to Cancer. That day would have been Manzarek's 77th birthday. The night featured Exene Cervenka and John Doe of the band X, Rami Jaffee of the Foo Fighters, Stone Temple Pilots' Robert Deleo, Jane's Addiction's Stephen Perkins, Emily Armstrong of Dead Sara, Andrew Watt, among others.

In 2025, as part of their 60th anniversary celebrations, John Densmore and Robby Krieger, joined by archival recordings of Jim Morrison and Ray Manzarek, reunited as The Doors for a performance of "Riders On The Storm" produced for the Playing for Change foundation. Released on January 9, 2026, the video was a part of their "Song Around the World" series, and the finished recording included a long list of international collaborators, in the style of other productions for the series.

== After the Doors ==
After Morrison died in 1971, Densmore and Krieger went to London looking for a new lead singer. They formed the Butts Band in 1973 there, signing with Blue Thumb Records. They released an album titled Butts Band the same year, then disbanded in 1975 after a second album.

Manzarek made three solo albums from 1974 to 1983 and formed a band called Nite City in 1975, which released two albums in 1977–1978. Krieger released six solo albums from 1977 to 2010. In 2002, the two together formed a new version of the Doors which they called the Doors of the 21st Century. Due to legal battles with Densmore and the Morrison estate over use of the Doors name, they changed their name several times and ultimately toured under the name "Manzarek–Krieger" or "Ray Manzarek and Robby Krieger of the Doors". The group toured extensively throughout their career. In July 2007, Densmore announced he would not reunite with the Doors unless Eddie Vedder of Pearl Jam was the lead singer.

On May 20, 2013, Manzarek died at a hospital in Rosenheim, Germany, at the age of 74 due to complications related to bile duct cancer. Krieger and Densmore came together on February 12, 2016, at a benefit concert memorial for Manzarek. All proceeds went to "Stand Up to Cancer".

== Legacy ==
The band presaged gothic rock due to the violence and the darkness present in their early work. As soon as 1967, critic John Stickney announced in the title of his article: "Four Doors to the Future: Gothic Rock Is Their Thing". Journalist Dave Marsh would also qualify a few years later the "first couple of Doors albums" as a prime example of "gothic rock". Academics Paul Hegarty and Martin Halliwell argued that the Doors were precursors of prog and reflected important developments in progressive music.

Beginning in the late 1970s, there was a sustained revival of interest in the Doors which created a new generation of fans. The origin of the revival is traced to the release of the album An American Prayer in late 1978 which contained a live version of "Roadhouse Blues" that received considerable airplay on album-oriented rock radio stations. In 1979, the song "The End" was featured in dramatic fashion in the film Apocalypse Now, and the next year, the bestselling biography of Morrison No One Here Gets Out Alive was published. The Doors' first album, The Doors, re-entered the Billboard 200 album chart in September 1980 and Elektra Records reported the Doors' albums were selling better than in any year since their original release. In response a new compilation album, Greatest Hits, was released in October 1980. The album peaked at No. 17 in Billboard and remained on the chart for nearly two years.

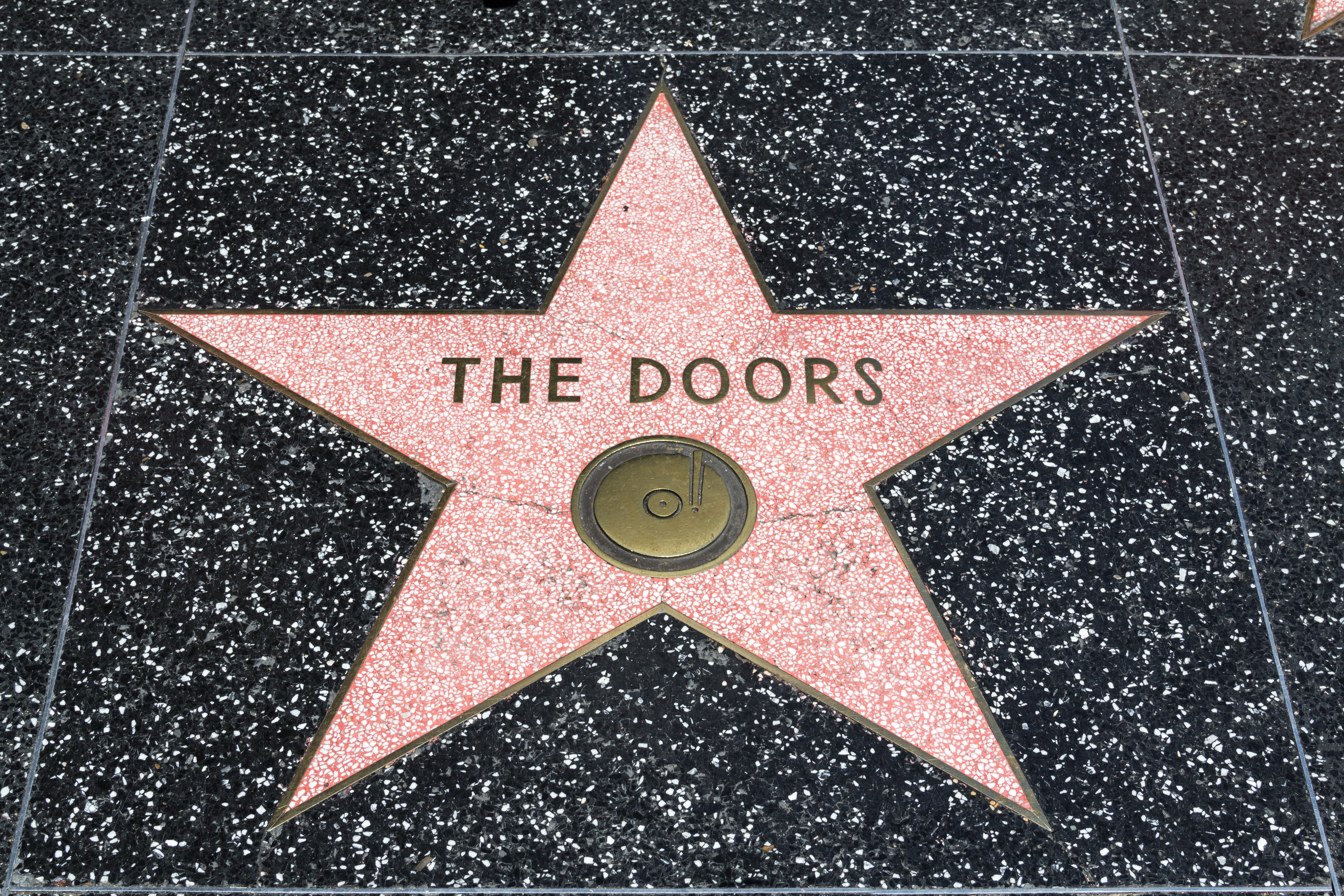
A star for The Doors on the Hollywood Walk of Fame, Los Angeles, California

The revival continued in 1983 with Alive, She Cried, an album of previously unreleased live recordings. The track "Gloria" reached No. 18 on the Billboard Top Tracks chart and the video was in heavy rotation on MTV. Another compilation album, The Best of the Doors was released in 1985 and went on to be certified Diamond in 2007 by the Recording Industry Association of America for sales of 10 million certified units.

A second revival, attracting another generation of fans, occurred in 1991 following the release of the film The Doors, directed by Oliver Stone and starring Val Kilmer as Morrison. Stone created the script from over a hundred interviews of people who were in Morrison's life. He designed the movie by picking the songs and then adding the appropriate storylines to them. The remaining band members did not like the film's portrayal of the events. In the book The Doors, Manzarek states, "That Oliver Stone thing did real damage to the guy I knew: Jim Morrison, the poet." In addition, Manzarek claims that he wanted the movie to be about all four members of the band, not only Morrison. Densmore asserts, "A third of it's fiction." In the same volume, Krieger agrees with the other two, but also says, "It could have been a lot worse." The film's soundtrack album reached No. 8 on the Billboard album chart and Greatest Hits and The Best of the Doors re-entered the chart, with the latter reaching a new peak position of No. 32.

=== Awards and nominations ===
Year	Award	Category	Work	Result	Ref.
1993	Rock and Roll Hall of Fame		Themselves	Inducted	
1998	Grammy Awards	Hall of Fame	"Light My Fire"	Inducted	
2002	Grammy Awards	Hall of Fame	The Doors	Inducted	
2007	Grammy Awards	Lifetime Achievement Award	Themselves	Honored	
2010	Grammy Awards	Hall of Fame	"Riders on the Storm"	Inducted	
2014	British Classic Rock Magazine's Roll of Honour	Tommy Vance "Inspiration" Award	Themselves	Honored	
2015	Library of Congress	National Recording Registry	The Doors	Included	

=== Miscellaneous honors ===
- In 1998, VH-1 compiled a list of the 100 Greatest Artists of Rock and Roll. The Doors were ranked number 20 by top music artists while Rock on the Net readers ranked them number 15.
- In 2000, the Doors were ranked number 32 on VH1's 100 Greatest Hard Rock Artists, and "Light My Fire" was ranked number seven on VH1's Greatest Rock Songs.
- In 2004, Rolling Stone ranked the Doors 41st on their list of 100 Greatest Artists of All Time.
- Also in 2004, Rolling Stone magazine's list of The 500 Greatest Songs of All Time included two of their songs: "Light My Fire" at number 35 and "The End" at number 328.
- In 2007, the Doors received a star on the Hollywood Walk of Fame.
- In 2011, director Tom DiCillo received a Grammy Award in Best Long Form Music Video for The Doors' film When You're Strange.
- In 2012, Rolling Stone magazine's list of The 500 Greatest Albums of All Time included three of their studio albums; the self-titled album at number 42, L.A. Woman at number 362, and Strange Days at number 407.
- In 2016, the Doors was awarded by All Music for Favorite Reissues and Compilation for the live album London Fog 1966.
- The Doors were honored for the 50th anniversary of their self-titled album release, January 4, 2017, with the city of Los Angeles proclaiming that date "The Day of the Doors". At a ceremony in Venice, Los Angeles Councilmember Mike Bonin introduced surviving members Densmore and Krieger, presenting them with a framed proclamation and lighting a Doors sign beneath the famed 'Venice' letters.
- The 2018 Asbury Park Music & Film Festival has announced the film submission award winners. The ceremony was held on Sunday, April 29 at the Asbury Hotel hosted by Shelli Sonstein, two-time Gracie Award winner, co-host of the Jim Kerr Rock and Roll Morning Show on Q104.3 and APMFF Board member. The film Break on Thru: Celebration of Ray Manzarek and The Doors, won the best length feature at the festival.
- In 2020, Rolling Stone listed the 50th Anniversary Deluxe Edition of Morrison Hotel among "The Best Box Sets of the Year".

== Band members ==
- Jim Morrison – lead vocals, percussion (1965–1971; his death)
- Ray Manzarek – keyboards, keybass, backing and lead vocals (1965–1973, 1978, 1993, 1997, 2000, 2011–2012, 2012–2013; his death)
- Robby Krieger – guitar, backing and lead vocals (1965–1973, 1978, 1993, 1997, 2000, 2011–2012, 2012–2013, 2025)
- John Densmore – drums, percussion (1965–1973, 1978, 1993, 1997, 2000, 2011–2012, 2012–2013, 2025), backing vocals (1966)
- Patricia Sullivan (Patricia Hansen) – bass (1965)

=== Live musicians ===
- Jack Conrad – bass (1972)
- Bobby Ray Henson – rhythm guitar (1972)
- Eddie Vedder – vocals (1993)
- Don Was – bass (1993)
- Angelo Barbera – bass (2000)
- Perry Farrell – vocals (2000)
- Pat Monahan – vocals (2000)
- Ian Astbury – vocals (2000)
- Travis Meeks – vocals (2000)
- Scott Weiland – vocals (2000; died 2015)
- Scott Stapp – vocals (2000)

=== Session musicians ===
- Larry Knechtel – bass (1966–1967; died 2009); on The Doors (1967)
- Doug Lubahn – bass (1967, 1968–1969; died 2019); on Strange Days (1967), Waiting for the Sun (1968), The Soft Parade (1969)
- Kerry Magness – bass (1968; died 2004); on Waiting for the Sun (1968)
- Leroy Vinnegar – acoustic bass (1968; died 1999); on Waiting for the Sun (1968)
- Harvey Brooks – bass (1968–1969); on The Soft Parade (1969)
- Curtis Amy – saxophone (1968–1969; died 2002); on The Soft Parade (1969)
- George Bohanon – trombone (1968–1969; died 2024); on The Soft Parade (1969)
- Champ Webb – English horn (1968–1969); on The Soft Parade (1969)
- Jesse McReynolds – mandolin (1968–1969; died 2023); on The Soft Parade (1969)
- Jimmy Buchanan – fiddle (1968–1969); on The Soft Parade (1969)
- Reinol Andino – conga (1968–1969); on The Soft Parade (1969), percussion (1978); on An American Prayer (1978)
- Ray Neopolitan – bass (1970, 1971); on Morrison Hotel (1970), Other Voices (1971)
- Lonnie Mack – bass (1970; died 2016); on Morrison Hotel (1970)
- John Sebastian (aka G. Puglese) – blues harp (1970); on Morrison Hotel (1970)
- Jerry Scheff – bass (1970–1971, 1978); on L.A. Woman (1971), Other Voices (1971), An American Prayer (1978)
- Marc Benno – rhythm guitar (1970–1971); on L.A. Woman (1971)
- Jack Conrad – bass (1971, 1972; died 2017); on Other Voices (1971), Full Circle (1972), rhythm guitar (1972); on Full Circle (1972)
- Willie Ruff – acoustic bass (1971; died 2023); on Other Voices (1971)
- Wolfgang Melz – bass (1971); on Other Voices (1971)
- Emil Richards – marimba (1971; died 2019); on Other Voices (1971)
- Francisco Aguabella – percussion (1971; died 2010); on Other Voices (1971)
- Venetta Fields – vocals (1972); on Full Circle (1972)
- Clydie King – vocals (1972; died 2019); on Full Circle (1972)
- Melissa Mackay – vocals (1972; died 2023); on Full Circle (1972)
- Chris Ethridge – bass (1972; died 2012); on Full Circle (1972)
- Charles Larkey – bass (1972); on Full Circle (1972)
- Leland Sklar – bass (1972); on Full Circle (1972)
- Charles Lloyd – tenor saxophone, flute (1972); on Full Circle (1972)
- Bobbye Hall – percussion (1972); on Full Circle (1972)
- Chico Batera – percussion (1972; died 2012); on Full Circle (1972)
- Bob Glaub – bass (1978); on An American Prayer (1978)

== Discography ==
- The Doors (1967)
- Strange Days (1967)
- Waiting for the Sun (1968)
- The Soft Parade (1969)
- Morrison Hotel (1970)
- L.A. Woman (1971)
- Other Voices (1971)
- Full Circle (1972)
- An American Prayer (1978)

== Videography ==
- The Doors Are Open (1968)
- Feast of Friends (1969)
- A Tribute to Jim Morrison (1981)
- Dance on Fire (1985)
- Live at the Hollywood Bowl (1987)
- Live in Europe 1968 (1989)
- The Doors (1991)
- The Soft Parade: A Retrospective (1991)
- The Best of the Doors (1997)
- The Doors Collection – Collector's Edition (1999)
- VH1 Storytellers – The Doors: A Celebration (2001)
- The Doors – 30 Years Commemorative Edition (2001)
- No One Here Gets Out Alive (2001)
- Soundstage Performances (2002)
- The Doors of the 21st Century: L.A. Woman Live (2003)
- The Doors Collector's Edition – (3 DVD) (2005)
- Classic Albums: The Doors (2008)
- When You're Strange (2009)
- Mr. Mojo Risin' : The Story of L.A. Woman (2011)
- Live at the Bowl '68 (2012)
- R-Evolution (2013)
- The Doors Special Edition – (3 DVD) (2013)
- Live at the Isle of Wight Festival 1970 (2018)
- Break on Thru: Celebration of Ray Manzarek and The Doors (2018)

== See also ==
- Outline of the Doors
- The Doors of Perception

== Sources ==
- Cherry, Jim (March 25, 2013). The Doors Examined. Bennion/Kearny. ISBN 978-1909125124.
- Davis, Stephen (2005). Jim Morrison: Life, Death, Legend. New York: Gotham Books. ISBN 978-1-59240-099-7.
- Debolt, Abbe A.; Baugess, James S. (December 2011). Encyclopedia of the Sixties: A Decade of Culture and Counterculture. ABC-CLIO. ISBN 978-0-313-32944-9.
- Densmore, John (1990). Riders on the Storm: My Life with Jim Morrison and the Doors. Delacorte Press. ISBN 978-0-385-30033-9.
- Einarson, John (2001). Desperados: The Roots of Country Rock. Cooper Square Press. ISBN 978-0-8154-1065-2.
- Fong-Torres, Ben; The Doors (October 25, 2006). The Doors. Hyperion. ISBN 978-1-4013-0303-7.
- Gaar, Gillian G. (July 8, 2015). The Doors: The Illustrated History. Voyageur Press. ISBN 978-0760346907.
- Gilliland, John (1969). "Show 1" (audio). Pop Chronicles. University of North Texas Libraries.
- Hegarty, Paul; Halliwell, Martin (2011). Beyond and Before: Progressive Rock Since the 1960s. New York: The Continuum International Publishing Group. ISBN 978-0-8264-2332-0.
- Hinman, Doug (2004). The Kinks: All Day and All of the Night. Hal Leonard Corporation. ISBN 0-87930-765-X.
- Hogan, Peter K. (1994). The Complete Guide To the Music of the Doors. Music Sales Group. ISBN 978-0-7119-3527-3.
- Hopkins, Jerry; Sugerman, Danny (1980). No One Here Gets Out Alive. New York: Warner Books. ISBN 978-0-446-97133-1.
- Luhrssen, David; Larson, Michael (2017). Encyclopedia of Classic Rock. ABC-CLIO. ISBN 978-1440835148.
- Krieger, Robby (2021). Set the Night on Fire: Living, Dying, and Playing Guitar with the Doors. Hachette. ISBN 978-0316243544.
- Manzarek, Ray (1998). Light My Fire: My Life With the Doors. New York: Putnam. ISBN 978-0-399-14399-1.
- Matijas-Mecca, Christian (2020). Listen to Psychedelic Rock! Exploring a Musical Genre. Hardcover. ISBN 978-1440861970.
- Moskowitz, David (2015). The 100 Greatest Bands of All Time: A Guide to the Legends Who Rocked the World. Santa Barbara, California: Greenwood. ISBN 978-1440803390.
- Olsen, Brad (2007). Sacred Places Europe: 108 Destinations. San Francisco: CCC Publishing. ISBN 978-1-888729-12-2.
- Riordan, James; Prochnicky, Jerry (1991). Break On Through: The Life and Death of Jim Morrison. Quill. ISBN 978-0-688-11915-7.
- Riordan, James (September 1996). Stone: A Biography of Oliver Stone. New York: Aurum Pres. ISBN 1-85410-444-6.
- Segalstad, Eric; Hunter, Josh (2008). The 27s: The Greatest Myth of Rock & Roll. Berkeley Lake, GA: Samadhi Creations. ISBN 978-0615189642.
- Thompson, Dave (2009). Your Pretty Face Is Going to Hell: The Dangerous Glitter of David Bowie, Iggy Pop, and Lou Reed. Rowman & Littlefield. ISBN 978-0879309855.
- Goldsmith, Melissa Ursula Dawn (2019). Listen to Classic Rock! Exploring a Musical Genre. ABC-CLIO. ISBN 978-1440865787.
- Wall, Mick (October 30, 2014). Love Becomes a Funeral Pyre: A Biography of The Doors. Hachette UK. ISBN 978-1409151258.
- Wallace, Richard (September 18, 2010). The Lazy Intellectual: Maximum Knowledge, Minimal Effort. Adams Media. ISBN 978-1-4405-0888-2.
- Weidman, Rich (October 1, 2011). The Doors FAQ: All That's Left to Know About the Kings of Acid Rock. Rowman & Littlefield.
