= Strange Days (Doors song) =

1967 song by The Doors

Song by the Doors

from the album Strange Days
- Released: September 25, 1967
- Recorded: April 26, 1967
- Genre: Psychedelia
- Length: 3:05
- Label: Elektra
- Songwriter: The Doors
- Producer: Paul A. Rothchild

"Strange Days" is a song by the Doors, released in 1967 as the opening track on the album of the same name.

Along with other album tracks, it was composed long before the date it was recorded; a live performance from May 1966 was released on the 2016 album London Fog 1966. The track is also recognised as one of the earliest showcases for the use of the Moog synthesizer.

== Composition ==
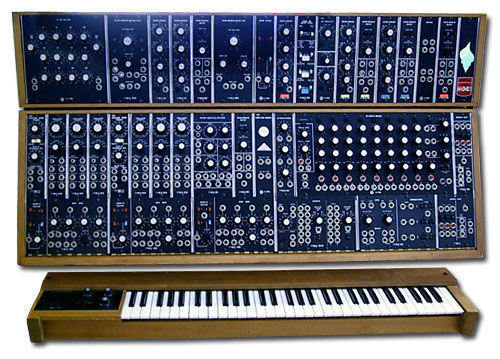
Photo of the Moog synthesizer which was used for the song

AllMusic critic Tom Maginnis, wrote that "Strange Days" seems to find Jim Morrison "pondering the state of the then emerging hippie youth culture and how they are perceived by mainstream or 'straight' society". The song's lyrics were inspired following a visitation of the Doors in New York City. Music Journalist Stephen Davis noted that Morrison's lyrics have an "emotionally raw tone" on the song.

The track is known for its distinctive usage of the Moog synthesizer, which was made available the same year of the song's recording. In the Doors' biography No One Here Gets Out Alive, authors Danny Sugerman and Jerry Hopkins, described "Strange Days" as "one of the earliest examples of the Moog synthesizer in rock". The synth was provided by Jim Morrison to filter his vocals by playing notes, and it was hooked up with the help of Paul Beaver. Doors' engineer Bruce Botnick recalled the instrument's contribution:

We created an envelope where we could feed Jim's track into the Moog so that he could play any note on the keyboard and it would process his voice ... I then added a little delay and fed the whole thing into an infinite tape repeat. That was hand-played.

The track was recorded in thirty-eight takes during a night session on April 26, 1967 at Sunset Sound Recorders.

The Rolling Stone review of Strange Days called the song a "heavy, evocative and climactic piece" that has "the same commercial potential of 'Light My Fire.'"

== Music videos ==
Two music videos were made for the song. The first featured footage of the band backstage and onstage, as well as Jim Morrison driving his car into a hole in sand and jumping on the hood in frustration. The second features the same circus performers on the Strange Days cover photo, who would explore New York City. It also included footage of various people, which was made "swervy" and distorted to fit in with the strange theme of the song. All of this new footage was mixed with footage of the old video, and re-released as a re-mixed video.

== Personnel ==
Personnel taken from Sound on Sound, except where noted.

The Doors

- Jim Morrison – vocals, Moog synthesizer
- Ray Manzarek – electric organ, keyboard bass
- Robby Krieger – guitar
- John Densmore – drums

Additional musician

- Doug Lubahn – bass guitar

== Strange 2013 ==
"Strange 2013"

Song by Tech N9ne

from the album Something Else
- Released: July 30, 2013
- Recorded: 2012–2013
- Genre: Hip hop
- Length: 3:31
- Label: Strange Music
- Songwriters: The Doors; Tech N9ne
- Producer: Fredwreck

In 2012, the surviving members of the Doors—Ray Manzarek, Robby Krieger and John Densmore, assembled in Los Angeles, California's Village Recorders recording studio with rapper Tech N9ne and producer Fredwreck to record a reworked version of the song. The rapper had intentions on building off "People Are Strange", but Krieger suggested using "Strange Days" instead, as it had "more of a driving beat".

This version was titled "Strange 2013" and includes vocals of Doors frontman Morrison, appearing on the rapper's 2013 album Something Else. While speaking on the collaboration, the rapper noted how the band has inspired him over the years, explaining that "People Are Strange" and "Strange Days" were what he drew on when naming his record label Strange Music.
