= The Jonathan Winters Show =

- Genre: Variety/Sketch comedy
- Written by: George Atkins; Jack Douglas; Jonathan Winters
- Directed by: Norman Frank; Herbert Kenwith
- Presented by: Jonathan Winters
- Narrated by: Don Pardo
- Country of origin: United States
- Original language: English
- No. of seasons: 2

Production
- Producer: Norman Frank
- Running time: 15 minutes (approx. 12 minutes excluding ads)

Original release
- Network: NBC
- Release: October 2, 1956 – June 25, 1957

The Jonathan Winters Show is the first of two American television network variety show television programs to be hosted by comedian Jonathan Winters. The television series was broadcast from October 2, 1956 to June 25, 1957 on NBC.

== Synopsis ==
This Jonathan Winters Show was aired at the beginning of prime time, from 7:30 to 7:45 PM Eastern time on Tuesday nights, to round out the half-hour containing NBC's evening newscast, which was at the time, like all similar programs, likewise only 15 minutes long. This program replaced the Tuesday night broadcast of The Dinah Shore Show, which, since 1951, was broadcast on both Tuesday and Thursday nights and was reduced in October 1956 to Thursday nights only. Although network evening newscasts were not expanded to a half hour until 1963, the 1956-57 season was the last one in which the American networks aired 15 minute long entertainment programs to complete filling the time slot. This series holds the distinction of being the first television program to use videotape. A song performed by Your Hit Parade regular Dorothy Collins introduced the new format on October 23, 1956. Winters' show was also one of the first weekly series to broadcast In color.

== Format ==
This early Jonathan Winters Show consisted of an opening monologue by Winters, a musical number by a guest star, and a closing comedy sketch by Winters, which might also include the guest star.

== Cast ==
In addition to host Winters, announcer Don Pardo was on the program through March 1957, frequently also appearing with Winters in the sketches. After March, he was replaced by Wayne Howell in this role. Regular musical support was provided by the Eddie Safranski Orchestra.

== Bibliography ==
- Tim Brooks and Earle Marsh, The Complete Directory to Prime Time Network and Cable TV Shows 1946–Present, Ninth edition (New York: Ballantine Books, 2007) ISBN 978-0-345-49773-4
