= The Unknown Soldier (song) =

Single by the Doors

from the album Waiting for the Sun
- B-side: "We Could Be So Good Together"
- Released: March 1968
- Recorded: November 1967
- Studio: TTG Studios, Hollywood, California
- Genre: Psychedelia
- Length: 3:22
- Label: Elektra
- Songwriter: The Doors
- Producer: Paul A. Rothchild

The Doors singles chronology
"Love Me Two Times" (1967)	"The Unknown Soldier" (1968)	"Hello, I Love You" (1968)

"The Unknown Soldier" is a song by the American rock band the Doors. It is the first single from their 1968 album Waiting for the Sun released in March of the same year by Elektra Records. An accompanying 16mm publicity film for the song featuring the band was directed and produced by Edward Dephoure and Mark Abramson. The song became the band's fourth Top 40 hit in the US, peaking at number 39 on the Billboard Hot 100, and remained upon the Billboard Hot 100 list for eight weeks.

== Lyrics ==
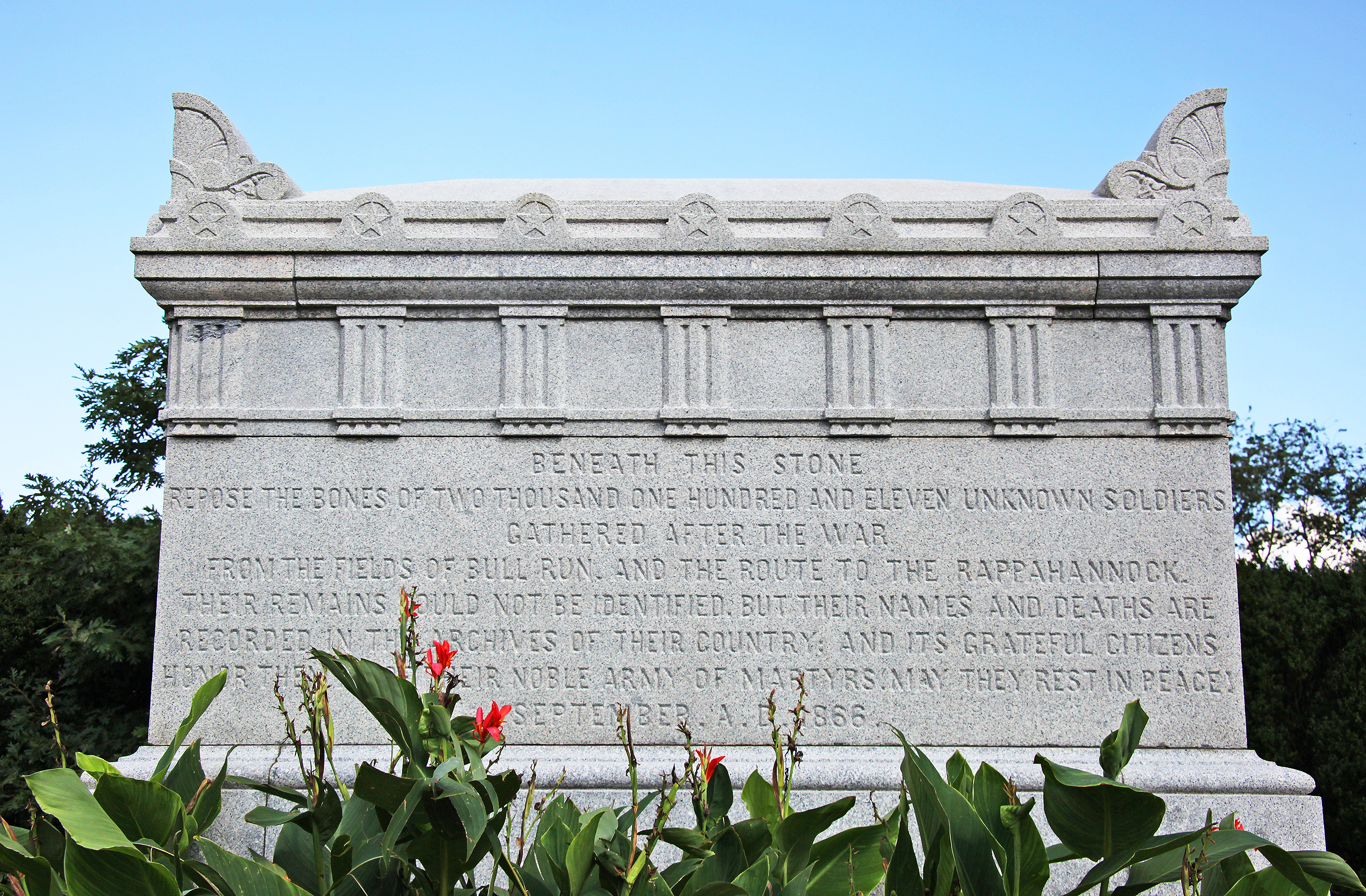
The Tomb of the Unknown Soldier at the Arlington National Cemetery, Virginia, which was the source of inspiration to Morrison's lyrics.

"The Unknown Soldier" has been perceived as Jim Morrison's reaction to the Vietnam War and the way that conflict was portrayed in American media at the time. According to author Richie Weidman, Morrison was inspired to write the lyrics after visiting the Tomb of the Unknown Soldier, at the Arlington National Cemetery, on November 25, 1967; the same day when the band performed at the Hilton Hotel, International Ballroom.

Karl Dallas of Melody Maker formulated that the song is "an apocalyptic piece which seems to sum up the Vietnam-nourished at the centre of American life." Lines such as "Breakfast where the news is read/ Television children fed/ Unborn living, living dead/ Bullets strike the helmet's head", concerned the way news of the war was being presented in the living rooms of ordinary people. The track ends with sounds of crowds cheering and bells tolling, representing an ecstatic celebration of a war being over.

== Composition ==
Matthew Greenwald of AllMusic described "The Unknown Soldier" as one of the Doors' "most complex recordings". He analyzed the song's musical structure as moving into various distinctly different sections before erupting into a coda:

It opens with an eerie organ intro before moving into a jazzy first verse ... A brilliant and dramatic middle section is actually a studio-recreated firing squad, complete with shots. The second verse is a slightly harder-rocking version of the first. The song then erupts into a climatic, extended coda, which is the audio re-creation of the celebration of either victory or the END of war.

== Release and reception ==
The released single was edited in which a different gunshot sound was used and does not include the cheering crowds nor the tolling bells at the end. Reportedly, producer Paul A. Rothchild was so particular about how the song came out that it ultimately took over 130 takes to finish. Upon completion, the song became the band's fourth Top 40 hit in the US, peaking at number 39 on the Billboard Hot 100, and enjoying an 8-week appearance on the Billboard Hot 100 list overall. "We Could Be So Good Together" served as the B-side. However, the lyrics were controversial at the time and many radio stations refused to play it.

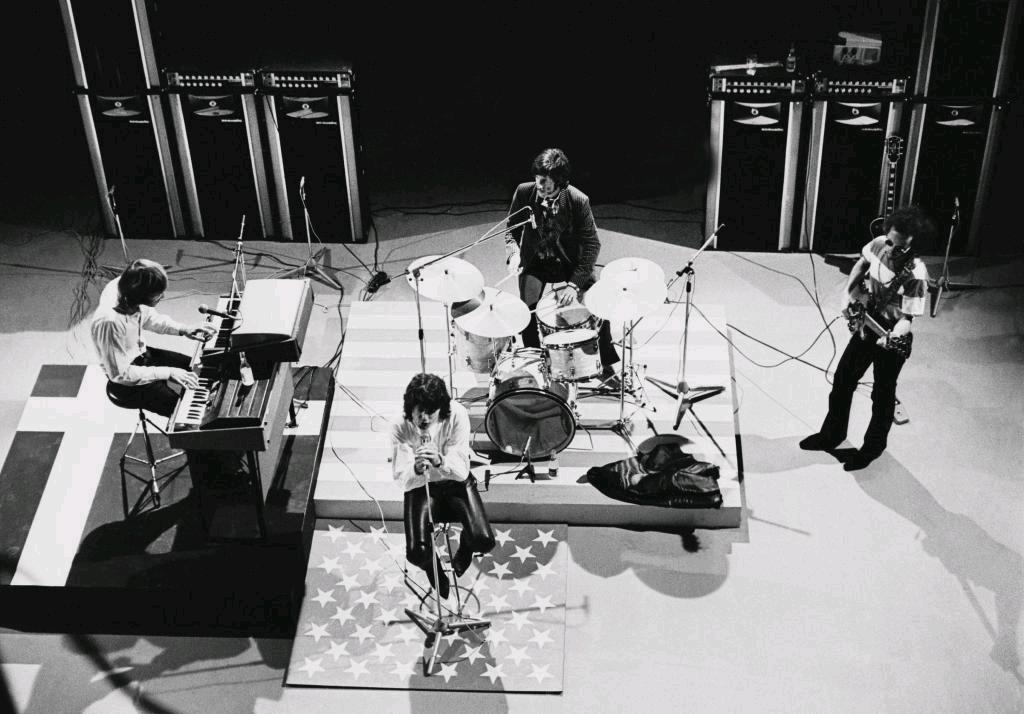
The Doors on Danish Television in 1968 where they made a cinematic performance of the song

The song's promotional film received enthusiastic comments at the Fillmore East, and has been publicized ever since as one of the first music videos in rock history. When playing the track in live concerts, the Doors usually approached a cinematic performance, with Morrison pretending to be shot by Robby Krieger onstage, illustrating the death of the soldier that is mentioned in the lyrics. Critic Charles S. Gardner of Bridgeport Telegram, reviewing the Doors concert in JFK Stadium, called "The Unknown Soldier" a "desperately anti-war ballad climaxing with Morrison's being thrown to the floor in a burst of exploding electronic feedback".

The New Musical Express identified the song to be the standout of the first side of Waiting for the Sun. Billboard described the single as "one of the most unusual and intriguing disks of the week in both arrangement and material" that "should prove a top chart item." Cash Box said that the "strong beat, instrumental majesty and a midway break unlike any dramatic effect on a single put together a smash outing," and also praised the "sheer passion" of the song.

In retrospect, Richie Unterberger declared "The Unknown Soldier" as one of the "first-rate tunes" of the album. He described it as "spooky" and "uncompromisingly forceful as anything the band did."

== Personnel ==
Taken from the liner notes of the Waiting for the Sun deluxe edition:

The Doors

- Jim Morrison – vocals
- Robby Krieger – guitar
- Ray Manzarek – keyboards
- John Densmore – drums

Additional musicians

- Kerry Magness – electric bass

Technical

- Paul A. Rothchild – production
- Bruce Botnick – engineering

== Charts ==
Chart (1968)	Peak position
Netherlands (Single Top 100)	17
US Billboard Hot 100	39

== See also ==
- List of anti-war songs
