= Winston Churchill as a painter =

An early self-portrait by Churchill showing him with a palette, dated to 1919/20. Cannadine says that it is one of his earliest pieces, painted when he was still depressed after the failure of the Dardanelles expedition.

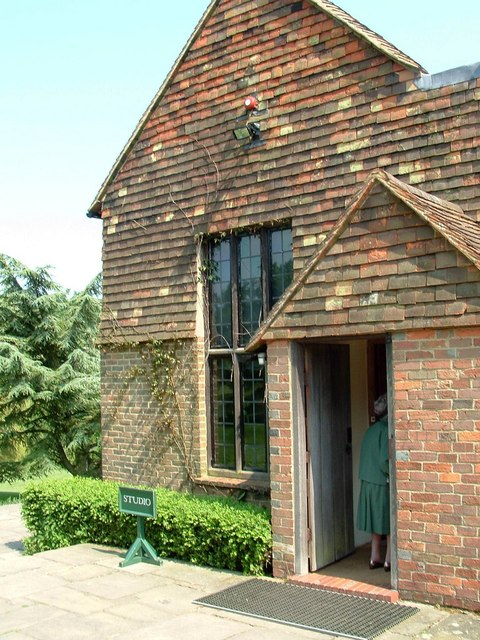
The studio that Churchill built for himself at Chartwell in the 1930s

Winston Churchill was introduced to painting during a family holiday in June 1915, when his political career was at a low ebb. He continued this hobby into his old age, painting over 500 pictures of subjects such as his goldfish pond at Chartwell and the landscapes and buildings of Marrakesh. He sold some works, but he also gave away many of the works that he self-deprecatingly described as "daubs" as gifts.

== 1915 ==
In May 1915, during the ill-fated Gallipoli campaign for which Churchill was widely held to be responsible, he had been removed from his post as First Lord of the Admiralty with demotion to Chancellor of the Duchy of Lancaster. He was somewhat depressed about that turn of events and was worried about the direction his career might take in the future. In June, he hired Hoe Farm, a country house in Hascombe near Godalming in Sussex, for a holiday with various members of his family, one of whom was his sister-in-law, Lady Gwendoline ("Goonie") Churchill (1885–1941), his brother's wife. Goonie was an amateur artist and Churchill watched her painting a watercolour. She invited him to take her brush and try it for himself. He was immediately captivated and painting became a lifelong hobby. He freely admitted that it revived his spirits and, as with writing, became an antidote to his frequent bouts of depression. He began with watercolour but soon applied himself to oils.

Churchill took painting materials to the Western Front when he went on active military service in 1915–16, painting the towns and landscape near Ploegsteert Wood in Flanders where he commanded the 6th Battalion, Royal Scots Fusiliers. He continued to paint after he returned to government as Minister of Munitions in 1917.

He received direction and encouragement from several professional artists, including his London neighbour Sir John Lavery, and later also Walter Sickert, William Nicholson and Paul Maze. His Portrait of Sir John Lavery in his Studio was shown at the annual exhibition of the Royal Society of Portrait Painters in London in 1919.

== 1920s ==
Churchill became Secretary of State for the Colonies in February 1921. The following month, the first public exhibition of his paintings was held at the Galerie Druet in Paris, with Churchill exhibiting under his pseudonym of "Charles Morin". Several of his landscape works were sold, at £30 each. He painted the pyramids when he visited Egypt as Secretary of State for the Colonies for the Cairo Conference in 1921, to determine arrangements for the government of Iraq and Transjordan under British control.

He wrote about his enjoyment of painting in two articles published in The Strand Magazine in December 1921 and January 1922, Hobbies and Painting as a pastime, for which he was paid £1,000. His essays were republished several times in different publications in the following years.

In September 1922, Churchill's fifth and last child, Mary, was born, and in the same month he purchased Chartwell, in Kent, which was the family home for the rest of his life. He constructed a studio at Chartwell in the 1930s, laying the bricks himself. The house and its gardens became a frequent source of inspiration for his paintings and Mary, who became Mary Soames, went on to write Winston Churchill: His Life as a Painter (1990) as a record of her father's art.

Soon afterwards, Churchill underwent an operation for appendicitis. While he was in hospital, the Conservatives withdrew from David Lloyd George's coalition government, precipitating the November 1922 general election, in which Churchill lost his seat in Dundee. He later wrote that he was "without an office, without a seat, without a party, and without an appendix". He spent much of the next six months at the Villa Rêve d'Or near Cannes, where he devoted himself to painting and writing The World Crisis, his memoirs of World War I.

He was re-elected to Parliament on 29 October 1924, as Member of Parliament for Epping, and was appointed Chancellor of the Exchequer. This role curtailed his hobbies somewhat but he continued to paint whenever possible, as when he took a lengthy Mediterranean holiday in January 1927, visiting Malta, Naples, Athens and Rome.

== 1940s ==
Churchill claimed to have painted only one picture while serving as British Prime Minister during the Second World War, Tower of the Koutoubia Mosque, a view of Marrakesh and the Atlas Mountains, painted from the balcony of the Villa Taylor while on an excursion with the U.S. President Franklin D. Roosevelt during the Casablanca Conference in January 1943. He later gave this painting of the Kutubiyya Mosque to Roosevelt as a memento of their time together. It was sold by Roosevelt's son Elliott in 1950. It was bought privately by Angelina Jolie in 2011 and subsequently sold at Christie's in 2021 for £7 million (£8.285M including buyer's premium).

At some time during the 1940s, though the exact date is unknown, Churchill is alleged to have repainted the mouse on a copy of the Rubens and Snyders work The Lion and the Mouse, which hangs in the Chequers library. Though the story is as yet unproven, Churchill is known to have retouched a painting in while staying at Lake Como in 1945. Later prime minister Harold Wilson said he found the story of Churchill's efforts to fix the Rubens reflective of his "confident and authoritative" personality.

Using the pseudonym "David Winter", Churchill submitted paintings for the Royal Academy Summer Exhibition in 1947 and 1948, having works selected each year. The Royal Academy of Arts elected Churchill as an "Honorary Academician Extraordinary" in 1948. His book Painting As A Pastime was published by Odhams Press in 1948, based on his 1921–22 Strand essays and illustrated with 18 colour plates of his works.

== 1950s and later ==
Water, still, bubbling, or agitated by wind; snow, immaculate and crisp; trees, dark with the density of their foliage or dappled by sunlight; fresh flowers; distant mountains, and, above all, sunlight at its fiercest.

— John Rothenstein on the “beauties of nature” which most inspired Churchill.

In 1954, in a collection of essays published to mark Churchill’s eightieth birthday, Sir John Rothenstein, art historian and Director of The Tate, contributed an appraisal of Churchill as an artist. He described a visit to the Chartwell studio in 1949, recording his alarm when, in response to a criticism of a picture painted twenty years before, Churchill began assembling paints and brushes to undertake a reworking. In his appreciation, Rothenstein noted Churchill’s lack of formal training and his limitations as a painter, but praised “the skilful choice of subjects within his range, to which he respond[ed] ardently. In these there comes surging irrepressibly up his sheer joy in the simple beauties of nature”. (Note: Sir John considered four of Churchill’s oeuvre as “the high peaks of his achievement”; The Goldfish Pool at Chartwell (1948), The Loup River Quebec (1947), Chartwell under Snow (1947) and Cannes Harbour, Evening (1923).) [See box.]

The "Churchill, the Painter" exhibition toured museums in North America in 1958, and was also shown at the Royal Academy in early 1959. Some U.S. galleries were dismissive: the assistant director of the Carnegie Institute in Pittsburgh said "I understand that Churchill is a terrific bricklayer too, but nobody is exhibiting bricks this season"; the director of the Art Institute of Chicago observed that "We have certain professional standards."

In 1967, the art historian David Coombs published a catalogue raisonné of Churchill's works, entitled Churchill: his paintings. The catalogue contains illustrations of, and details about, each of over 500 paintings known to have been undertaken by Churchill at the time of publication.

An exhibition of 105 Churchill paintings, held by Sotheby's in London in early 1998, was visited by 12,000 people in two weeks. From May to November 2026, an exhibition of some 60 of his works is to be held at the Wallace Collection in London.

== See also ==
- Paintings by Adolf Hitler
- Poetry of Joseph Stalin
