= Villa Taylor =

Historic house in Marrakesh

- Location within Morocco
- 31°38′09″N 8°00′21″W
- Type: House
- Location: Guéliz, Marrakesh, Morocco

History
- Built: 1927

Site notes
- Architectural style: Moorish Revival

The Villa Taylor is an historic residence in the Guéliz district of Marrakesh, Morocco. The villa was built between 1926 and 1927 by Moses Taylor, grandson of the merchant and banker Moses Taylor, and occupied after Taylor's death in 1928 by his widow, Edith Bishop Taylor. During the Second World War, the house was requisitioned by the American Government to house its Vice-Consul, Kenneth Pendar. In January 1943, Pendar hosted Franklin D. Roosevelt and Winston Churchill at the villa, following the Casablanca Conference. While staying at the villa, Churchill painted Tower of the Koutoubia Mosque, the only picture he undertook during the war. In 1947 Mrs Taylor sold the house to the mother of Comte Charles de Breteuil, who gave it to her son and his wife as a wedding present. Under de Breteuil's ownership, the villa hosted a number of entertainment-industry notables. The villa was subsequently bought by King Hassan II in 1985, who intended the house as a home for the Moroccan Crown Prince. The villa remains, albeit unused, in the possession of the Moroccan crown.

== History and description ==
You cannot come all the way to North Africa without seeing Marrakesh. Let us spend two days there. I must be with you when you see the sunset on the snows of the Atlas Mountains.

— Churchill, in The Hinge of Fate, recalling his efforts to cajole President Roosevelt to visit Marrakesh.

The villa was built in the new Lyautey-built Guéliz district between 1926 and 1927, and was designed in a mixed Art Deco and neo-Moorish style by Robert Poisson. Its most prominent feature was a five-story neo-Moorish tower, from which Churchill later painted Tower of the Koutoubia Mosque. The house was built by Moses Taylor, who died in 1928, and his wife, Edith Bishop Taylor. The Taylors spared no expense in decorating the house and its large gardens, which had views of Bab Doukkala, the city walls, and the Medina. In 1934, Edith donated a 1155 m² plot of the garden to the city of Marrakesh, which used the land to build a new street (now Rue Ibn Toumert). Edith remarried British-born railwayman G.J. Guthrie Nicholson in May 1938, and the couple relocated to Santa Barbara, California. Villa Taylor was left in the hands of a caretaker.

After Operation Torch, the house was requisitioned by the US Government, and Kenneth Pendar, an archaeologist, the US Vice-Consul and a secret agent was installed in residence. In January 1943, Franklin D. Roosevelt and Winston Churchill met at the Casablanca Conference, to determine the future direction of the war. At the conclusion of their summit, Churchill persuaded Roosevelt to undertake a short excursion to Marrakesh. Churchill had first visited the city in the winter of 1935-1936 and, despite initial reservations—“the crowds, the smells and the general discomfort for painting have repelled me”, he wrote—he stayed for three weeks and came to love the city he termed ‘The Paris of the Sahara’. He was determined that Roosevelt should share in his experiences. Roosevelt and Churchill were accommodated by Pendar at the Villa Taylor and, after experiencing the sunset from the villa's tower, enjoyed an evening of dinner and songs. After Roosevelt's departure the next day, Churchill remained at the villa, making plans for his travels and painting the Tower of the Koutoubia Mosque from the tower, the only picture he undertook during the war. (Note: Churchill subsequently presented the picture to President Roosevelt as a gift. It was later acquired by Angelina Jolie and achieved £7M, the highest price ever paid for a painting by Churchill, when auctioned by Jolie at Christie’s in 2021.) (Note: A very similar view, painted by Churchill in 1948, was presented to President Harry S. Truman.)

Personal recollections of the sojourn at the Villa Taylor were recorded by members of Churchill's staff, as well as by Churchill himself. Churchill’s aide-de-camp, Commander 'Tommy' Thompson, recorded the villa as, “built in the local style with a central courtyard, orange trees and fountains, and the interior decoration was exotic in the extreme”. Gerald Pawle, whose book on Churchill's wartime travels, The War and Colonel Warden, drew heavily on Thompson's recollections, described it as "decorated in native style, with lavish use of painted wood, mosaics and rich furnishings". General Alan Brooke, Chief of the Imperial General Staff, and Churchill's main military adviser, recalled both the villa, and his master's appearance within it. The villa was "very ornate and Moroccan with a wonderful garden". Churchill was no less colourful; "It was all I could do to remain serious. The room must have been Mrs Taylor's bedroom and was all done up in Moorish style, the ceiling was a marvellous fresco of green, blue and gold. And there in the bed was Winston, in his green, red and gold dragon dressing gown, his hair, or what there was of it, standing on end, the lights shining on his cheeks, and a large cigar in his face!" (Note: Alanbrooke's candid diaries had caused controversy when originally published, in expurgated form, in 1957. Churchill was infuriated by the descriptions of himself, replying to Alanbrooke's gift of an inscribed copy; "On the whole I think I am against publishing day to day diaries written under the stress of events so soon afterwards".) Churchill's long-time bodyguard Walter Thompson wrote, rather more respectfully; "No more suitable place for Mr Churchill to be at his painting could be imagined, the whole scene was a riot of the colour from which he draws his inspiration". Churchill himself was greatly taken with his temporary home, which he described in a letter to his wife, as "a fairyland villa".

On reclaiming the Villa Taylor at the end of the war, Mrs Taylor promptly sold it, reputedly because, as a staunch Republican, she objected to the villa's use by the Democratic Roosevelt. The purchaser was the mother of Comte Charles de Breteuil, a newspaper publisher, and he and his wife, Madeline, known as Boule, received the villa as a wedding present. Charles died in 1960 and the comtesse lived there on a lifetime lease until her death. Villa Taylor was also frequented by the couple's son, Jean, until his death in 1972; Jean, a playboy and drug dealer, hosted notables including Pamela Courson and Marianne Faithfull at the house. Upon the comtesse's death in 1994, the property went to King Hassan II, to whom the comtesse had sold it in the 1985. The King originally planned to offer the house to his son, the Crown Prince, but these plans were not taken forward. Some of the items from the house were sold by the comtesse prior to her death; one of its tables resides at the Villa Bled Roknine nearby.

== Sources ==
- Alanbrooke, Field Marshal Lord (2001). Danchev, Alex; Todman, Daniel (eds.). War Diaries 1939–1945. London: Weidenfeld & Nicolson. ISBN 978-0-297-60731-1. OCLC 470536346.
- Churchill, Winston (1951). The Hinge of Fate. The Second World War. Vol. IV. London: Cassell & Co. LTD. OCLC 973429324.
- —; Churchill, Clementine (1998). Soames, Mary (ed.). Speaking for Themselves: The Personal Letters of Winston and Clementine Churchill. London: Doubleday. ISBN 978-0-385-40691-8. OCLC 472576610.
- Coombs, David (1967). Churchill - his paintings. London: Hamish Hamilton. OCLC 3437376.
- —; Churchill, Minnie (2003). Sir Winston Churchill's Life Through his Paintings. London: Chaucer Press. ISBN 978-1-904-44916-4. OCLC 834797327.
- Fox Weber, Nicholas (1993). Gardens: Villa Taylor - The Comtesse De Breteuil's Marrakesh oasis (PDF). New York: Architectural Digest.
- Gilbert, Martin (1976). Prophet of Truth: Winston S. Churchill 1922–1939. Authorised biography of Winston S. Churchill. Vol. V. London: Heinemann. OCLC 715481469.
- — (1986). Road to Victory: Winston S. Churchill 1941–1945. Authorised biography of Winston S. Churchill. Vol. VII. London: Heinemann. ISBN 978-0-434-13017-7. OCLC 658165202.
- Pawle, Gerald (1963). The War and Colonel Warden. London: George G. Harrap and Co. OCLC 1506689.
- Roberts, Andrew (2008). Masters and Commanders. London: Allen Lane. ISBN 978-0-06-122857-5.
- Vale, Allister; Scadding, John (2020). Winston Churchill's Illnesses: 1886-1965. Oxford: Casemate UK. ISBN 978-1-526-78949-5. OCLC 1245342178.
