= Danny Sugerman =

Background information
- Born: Daniel Stephen Sugerman; October 11, 1954
- Origin: Los Angeles, California, U.S.
- Died: January 5, 2005 (aged 50) Los Angeles, California, U.S.
- Occupation: Music manager
- Years active: 1967–2005

Daniel Stephen Sugerman (October 11, 1954 – January 5, 2005) was the second manager of the Los Angeles–based rock band the Doors. He wrote several books about Jim Morrison and the Doors, including No One Here Gets Out Alive (co-authored with Jerry Hopkins), and the autobiography Wonderland Avenue: Tales of Glamour and Excess.

== Early life ==
Sugerman grew up in Beverly Hills. His family’s neighbors were Fred Astaire, Steve McQueen and Raquel Welch. At eleven, his Jewish-American parents divorced and his mother Harriet moved Danny and his siblings to Westchester, Los Angeles where she lived with a patent attorney who was a harsh disciplinarian. Danny attended Westchester High School in Los Angeles, where he regularly authored articles about The Doors in the student newspaper. He attended summer camp near Lakeshore City, California with Todd Fisher, Steven Crane Jr. and sons of golfer Ken Venturi and Don Knotts. Danny graduated from Westchester High School in 1972.

== Career ==
He began working with the Doors when he was 12 years old, answering their fan mail. At age 17 he replaced the Doors' original manager, Bill Siddons, following the death of Morrison in July 1971.

In fall 1973, Danny started a Rock and Roll fanzine, called "Heavy Metal Digest" (dedicated to Jim Morrison), which lasted three issues (through winter 1974), and featured musings of, interviews with, and album and concert reviews of artists including The Rolling Stones, Alice Cooper, John Lennon, and Iggy Pop. Among the fanzine's "Heavy Metal Kidz" contributors (as noted in its first issue in September 1973) was a teen-aged Cameron Crowe.

He later went on to manage Ray Manzarek's solo career and first album. He was also Iggy Pop's manager for a period, and produced his song "Repo Man", before they both ended up in mental hospitals suffering from drug and alcohol addiction. It was during this time that he was also manager for the L.A based glam/punk band, The Joneses, whose founder and lead singer, Jeff Drake, supplied them with high quality heroin. He also wrote Appetite For Destruction: The Days of Guns N' Roses in 1991.

== Personal life ==
For a short while in the 1980s, Sugerman dated actress Mackenzie Phillips. In 1993, he married Fawn Hall, who had been one of the principals in the Iran–Contra affair. They remained married until his death. They briefly met MP3.com co-founder Rod Underhill while Hall was employed there. Underhill later stated that "Sugerman was very interesting. He had appeared to go out of his way to appear visually like Jim Morrison. Same type of haircut, similar clothing. The similarity was uncanny." Sugerman discussed his idolization of Morrison in detail, in his autobiographical book Wonderland Avenue: Tales of Glamour and Excess.

In Wonderland Avenue: Tales of Glamour and Excess Sugerman went into detail about his heroin addiction and his involvement with drug dealers. At one point, he found solace in Buddhism, though he did not mention his interest in his memoir. It ends with a two-page chapter that reminds the reader of drug users whose behavior he described in previous chapters, and he says that as of 1988 they are all dead, incarcerated or, in one person’s case, doing his third stint in “a residential addict recovery facility.”

== Death ==
Sugerman died, aged 50, on January 5, 2005, in Los Angeles, from lung cancer.

== Books ==
- No One Here Gets Out Alive (1980, with Jerry Hopkins)
- The Doors, the Illustrated History (1983)
- Wonderland Avenue: Tales of Glamour and Excess (1989)
- Appetite For Destruction: The Days Of Guns N' Roses (1991)
