= Jean de Breteuil =

French aristocrat and drug dealer (1949–1971)

Jean de Breteuil (15 November 1949 – 25 June 1972) was a French aristocrat and drug dealer. He is best known for having supplied narcotics to entertainment industry figures, including Jim Morrison, from the late 1960s until his death.

== Family and early life ==
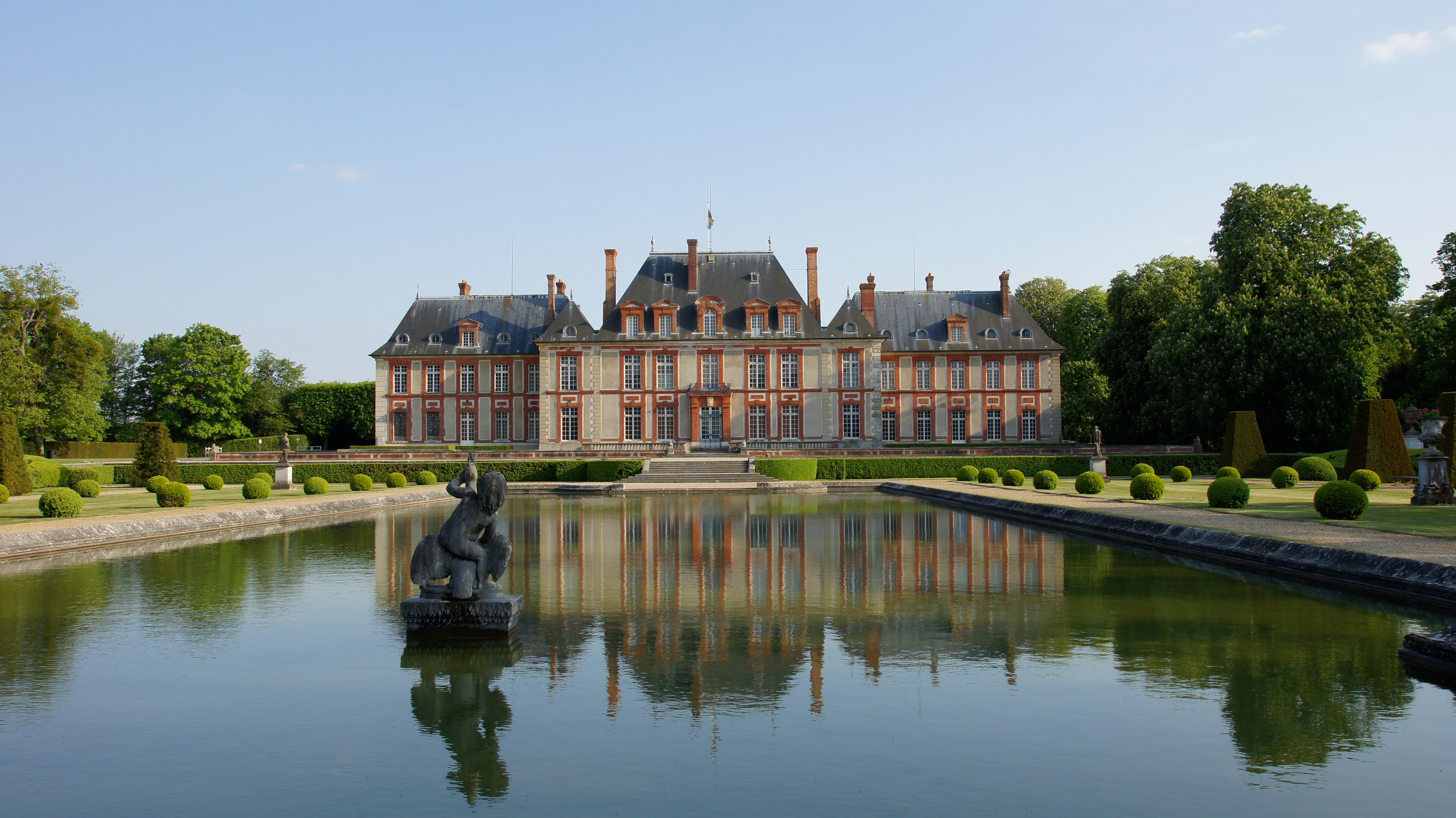
The Château de Breteuil, ancestral home of the counts of Breteuil

Jean de Breteuil was born in 1949 in Paris to comte Charles de Breteuil and his second wife, Madeleine Redier. His father, the Count of le Tonnelier de Breteuil, was a publisher who, from 1933 onwards, founded a number of daily newspapers in France's African colonies. In 1953, Charles was one of the chief contributors to the founding of L'Express. He was elected to the Académie des sciences d'outre-mer in 1960, shortly before his death. Upon his father's death, Jean inherited the title of Count and his father's assets, which were concentrated in North Africa. Jean's half-brother by Charles's first wife, Solange de Ganay, Michel de Breteuil, followed his father into the African media scene and founded the magazine Amina.

His mother, nicknamed "Boule de Breteuil", took up residence at the Breteuil house in Marrakesh, Villa Taylor, after Charles' death. Jean attended school in France, and began dealing drugs, mostly hashish, in his late teens, which he gained access to through his connections in Morocco.

== "Dealer to the Stars" and death ==
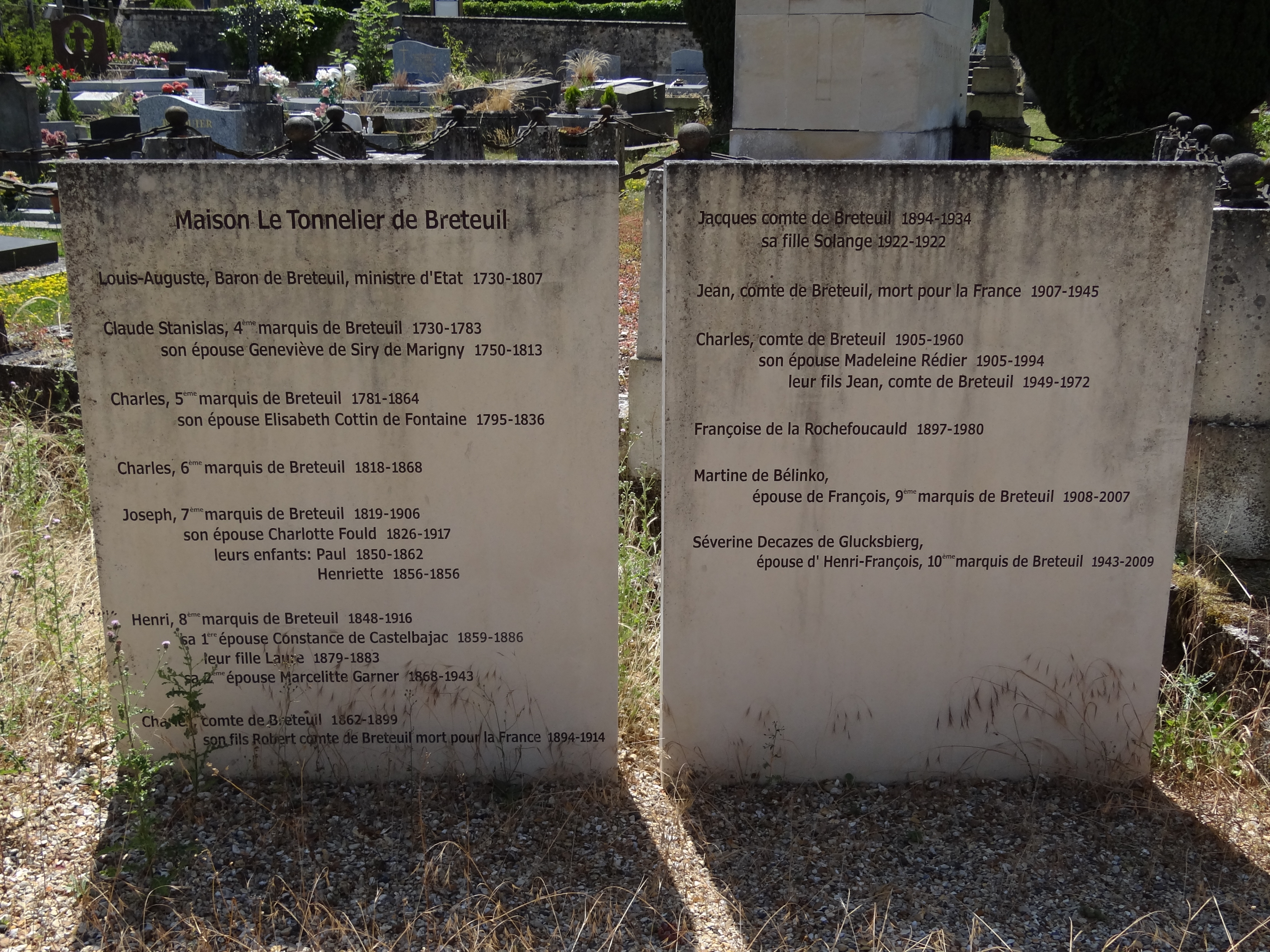
Tablet marking Jean's interment in the family vault

In 1967, Jean enrolled at the University of California, Los Angeles. In Los Angeles, he frequented the London Fog, and became a boyfriend of Pamela Courson, who was in an open relationship with Jim Morrison. He was supplied hashish and opium in diplomatic bags by a Moroccan chauffeur attached to the French Consulate, which he dealt onward to Courson and students at UCLA. Jean took Courson on several trips to France, Italy, and Morocco to purchase clothes for her boutique, Themis, which he used to procure more drugs. For his part, Morrison did not enjoy Jean's company and reportedly referenced him in the lyrics of Love Street. Not long after he began seeing Courson, Breteuil was supplying uncut Chinese French Connection heroin to her and others. Through 1970, Jean and Courson frequently spent time at Villa Taylor in Marrakesh. By summer 1970, Jean was no longer enrolled at UCLA and thus in the United States illegally, and made heroin dealing his primary employment.

According to Mercy Fontenot, Ed Sanders, and Stephen Davis, de Breteuil supplied Janis Joplin with the heroin which killed her on October 4, 1970. Afterward, he fled the United States with Courson, who stayed with him in Paris until December. In 1971, Jean began supplying and living with Keith Richards in Cheyne Walk, London, through whom he met Marianne Faithfull, who became his girlfriend and client. Also in London, Jean became the lover of Talitha Getty, his neighbor in Marrakesh. According to Robert Greenfield, Breteuil visited the Rolling Stones while they were recording at Nellcôte to initiate a heroin supply to the villa in mid-1971.

According to Faithfull, Sanders, and Davis, Jean played a major role in the death of Jim Morrison on July 3, 1971. Jean, who was living with Faithfull at the time, allegedly sold Morrison a fatal dose of heroin, and accompanied Courson to her and Morrison's apartment, where they discovered him at the verge of death. Jean left before Morrison's actual death. Courson never mentioned Jean's alleged presence to the police, but Alain Ronay, who assisted at the scene of Morrison's death, stated that Jean was present. Regardless of his involvement in Morrison's death, he and Faithfull decamped for Marrakesh shortly after July 3.

Jean de Breteuil died on June 25, 1972, in Marrakesh from a heroin overdose. He is buried in the Breteuil vault in Choisel cemetery, near the Chateau de Breteuil. His mother commemorated him with a statue in the gardens of Villa Taylor.
