= Rod Underhill =

Rod Underhill may refer to:

- Rod Underhill (author) (1953–2018), American attorney and author
- Rod Underhill (district attorney) (fl. 2012–2020), Multnomah County district attorney
