= Paintings by Adolf Hitler =

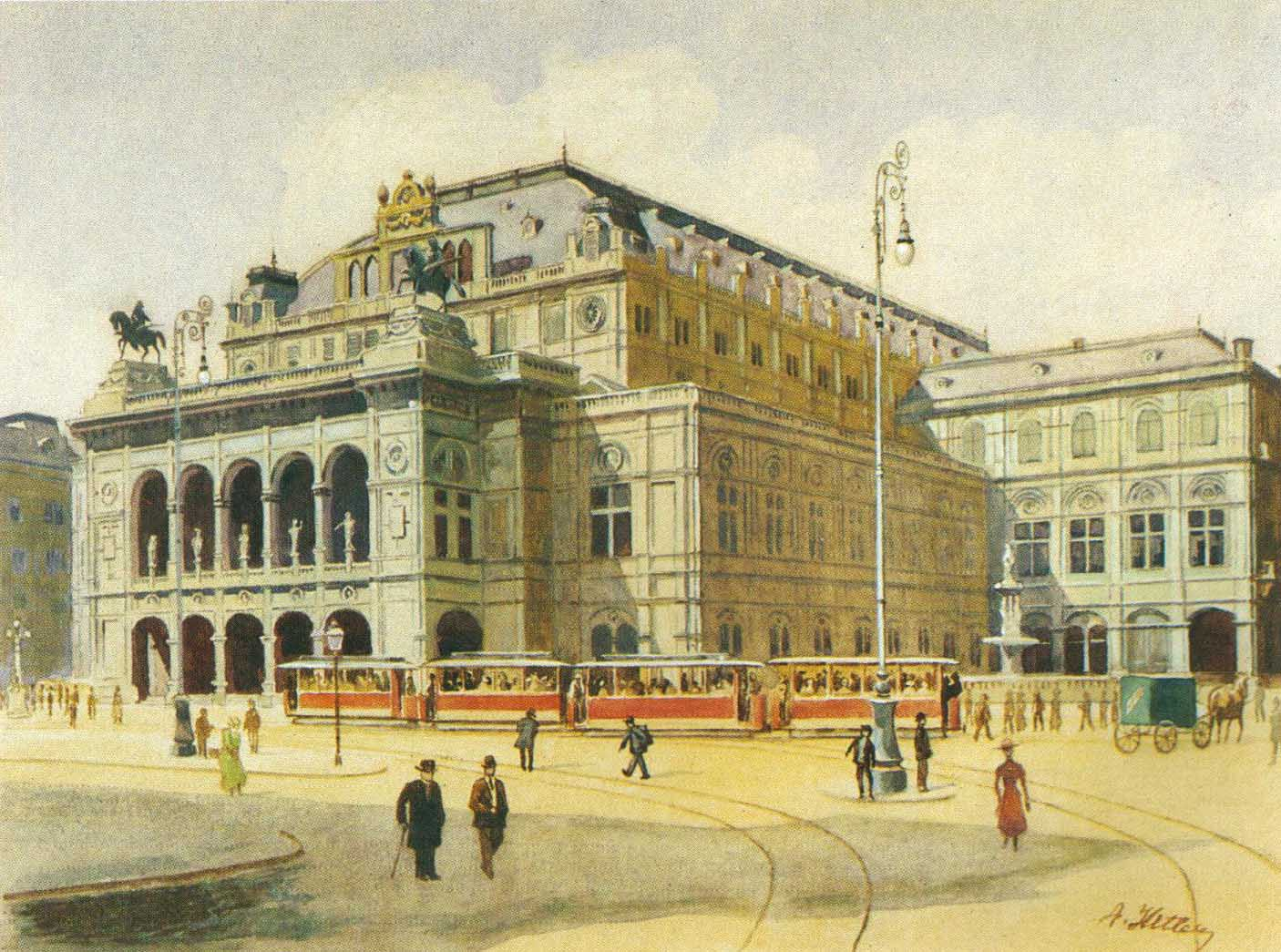
Vienna State Opera, 1912

Adolf Hitler, the dictator of Germany from 1933 until his suicide in 1945, was a painter in his youth. While living in Vienna between 1908 and 1913, Hitler worked as a professional artist and produced hundreds of works, to little commercial or critical success.

A number of the paintings were recovered after World War II and sold at auctions. Others were seized by the United States Army and are still in U.S. government possession.

== Style ==
Hitler's preferred subject was architecture, which he represented using "an amalgam of conventional styles". Instead of progressing, his works copied from nineteenth century and other artists. He drew primarily from Greco-Roman classicism, the Italian Renaissance, and Neoclassicism. He liked the technical ability displayed by this art as well as the comprehensible symbolism. He called Rudolf von Alt his greatest teacher. Both Hitler and von Alt exhibited an interest in similar subject matter and use of color.

== History ==
=== Artistic ambition ===
In his 1925 autobiography Mein Kampf (My Struggle), Hitler described how, in his youth, he wanted to become a professional artist, but his dreams were ruined because he failed the entrance exam of the Academy of Fine Arts Vienna. Hitler was rejected twice by the institute, once in 1907 and again in 1908. In his first examination, he had passed the preliminary portion which was to draw two of the assigned iconic or Biblical scenes, in two sessions of three hours each. The second portion was to provide a previously prepared portfolio for the examiners. It was noted that Hitler's works contained too few heads. The institute considered that he had more talent in architecture than in painting. One of the instructors, sympathetic to his situation and believing he had some talent, suggested that he apply to the academy's School of Architecture. However, that would have required returning to secondary school from which he had dropped out and to which he was unwilling to return. Although Hitler became a painter and never practiced architecture, he came to regard painting as "mere subsistence work" and considered architecture his true calling.

According to a conversation in August 1939, one month before the outbreak of World War II, published in The British War Blue Book, Hitler told British ambassador Nevile Henderson, "I am an artist and not a politician. Once the Polish question is settled, I want to end my life as an artist."

=== Vienna period ===
From 1908 to 1913, Hitler made a meager living as a professional artist. He painted his first self-portrait in 1910 at the age of 21. This painting, along with twelve other paintings by Hitler, was discovered by U.S. Army Sergeant Major Willie J. McKenna in 1945 in Essen, Germany.

Samuel Morgenstern, an Austrian businessman and a business partner of the young Hitler in his Vienna period, bought many of Hitler's paintings. According to Morgenstern, Hitler came to him for the first time at the beginning of the 1910s, either in 1911 or in 1912. When Hitler came to Morgenstern's glazier store for the first time, he offered Morgenstern three of his paintings. Morgenstern kept detailed records of his clientele, through which it was possible to locate the buyers of Hitler's paintings. It was found that the majority of the buyers were Jewish. An important client of Morgenstern, a lawyer by the name of Josef Feingold, bought a series of paintings by Hitler depicting old Vienna.

=== World War I ===
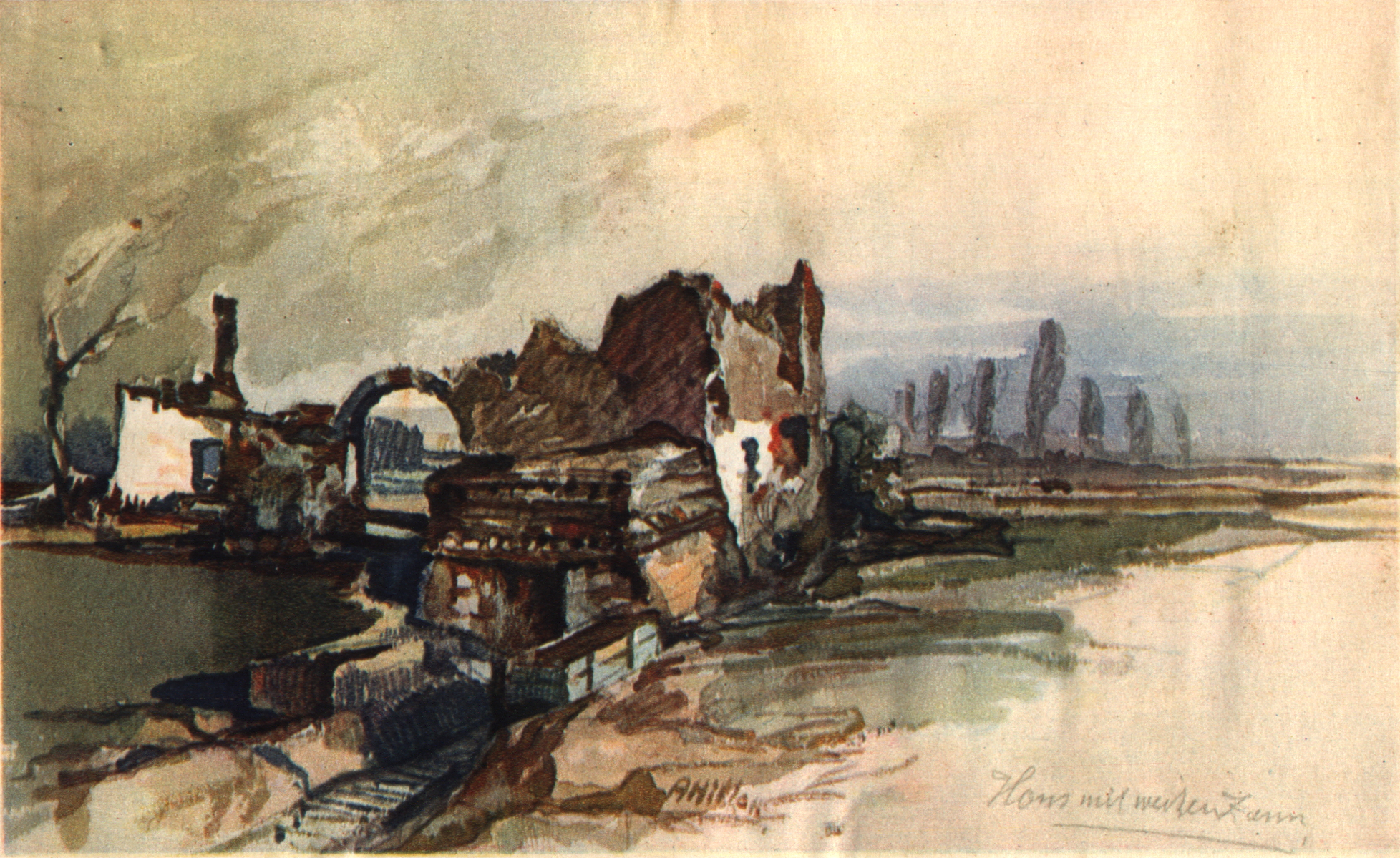
House with white fence (1917), watercolor

When Hitler served in World War I at the age of 25 in 1914, he carried fine paper with him to the front and spent hours of leave time drawing and painting. The works he painted during this period were among his last before he became a politician. The themes of his wartime painting included farmers' houses, the dressing-station, etc.

=== Attempt of retrieval and destruction ===
In 1936, Hitler appointed Ernst Schulte Strathaus to locate and buy paintings Hitler had painted from 1907 to 1912, and 1921 to 1922. One of the original people assigned by Strathaus to perform this task was Peter Jahn, who spent nearly four years tracking down Hitler's early works, until he was called into military service. Jahn became the Art Consultant to the German Embassy in Vienna in 1937, where he would then search for, purchase, and collect individual pieces of Hitler's art, allegedly in order to destroy a majority of the paintings. Jahn sold one of the largest collections of Hitler's art, about 18 pieces, with an average selling price of $50,000. According to O.K. Werckmeister, Hitler's motivation for the retrieval of his prewar paintings and drawings from their owners may have been "to keep public knowledge about Hitler's underachievement under political control". A group of architectural designs of proposed public buildings Hitler drew ca. 1925–26 were exempted from the retrieval order, possibly "because Hitler was prepared to acknowledge them as an ongoing concern germane to his activity as a politician."

=== Auctions, collections and forgeries ===
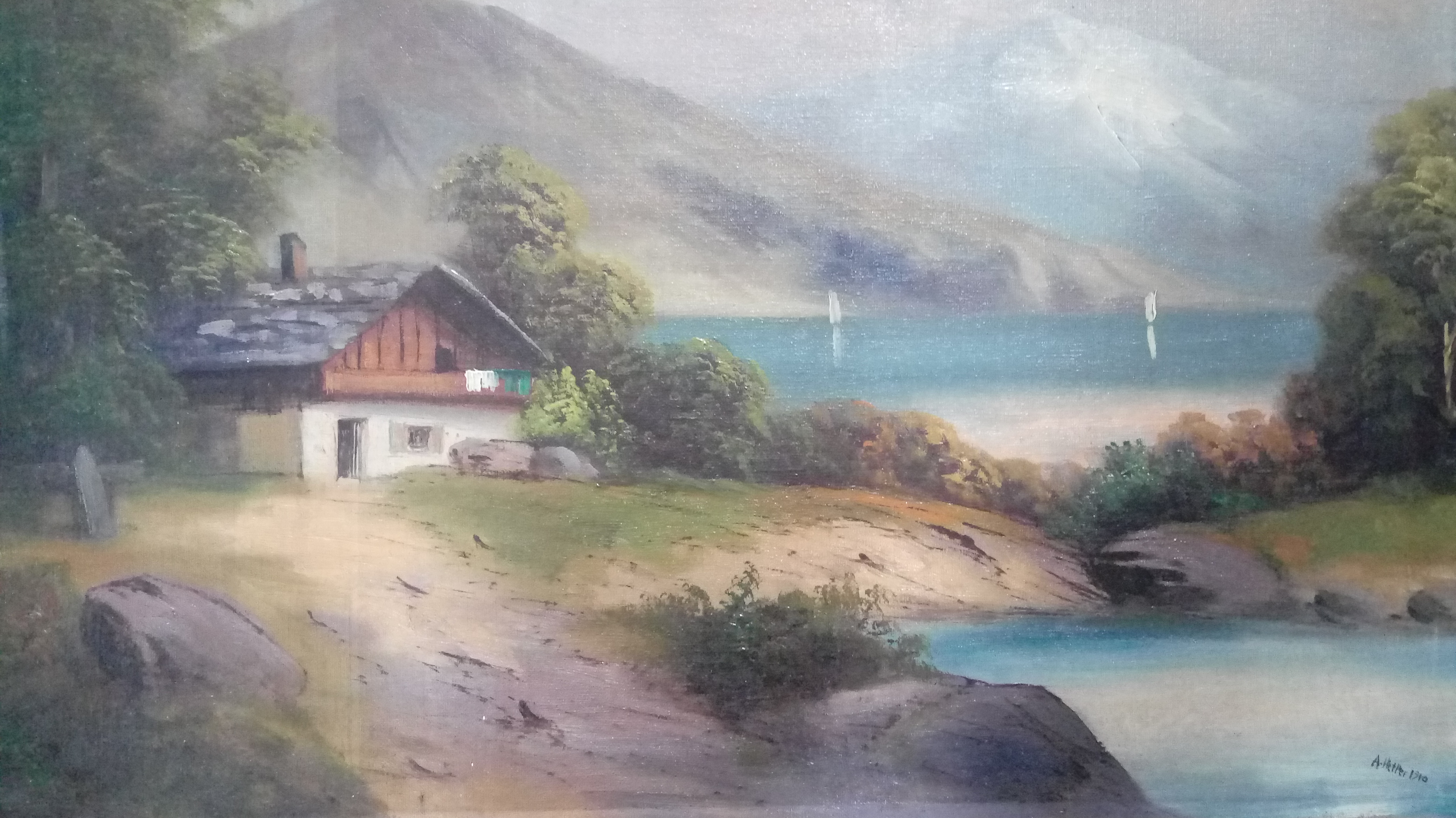
House at a lake with mountains, 1910

A number of Hitler's paintings were seized by the United States Army (some believed to still be in Germany) at the end of World War II. They were taken to the United States with other captured materials and are still held by the U.S. government, which has declined to allow them to be exhibited. Other paintings were kept by private individuals. In the 2000s, a number of these works began to be sold at auction. In 2009, auction house Mullock's of Shropshire sold 15 of Hitler's paintings for a total of £97,672 (US $102,239), while auctioneers at Ludlow Racecourse of Shropshire sold 13 works for over €100,000. In a 2012 auction in Slovakia, a mixed-media painting fetched €32,000. And on 18 November 2014, a watercolour by Hitler of the old registry office in Munich (Standesamt München) sold for €130,000 at an auction in Nuremberg. The watercolour included a bill of sale and a signed letter by Albert Bormann, which may have contributed to its comparatively high selling price.

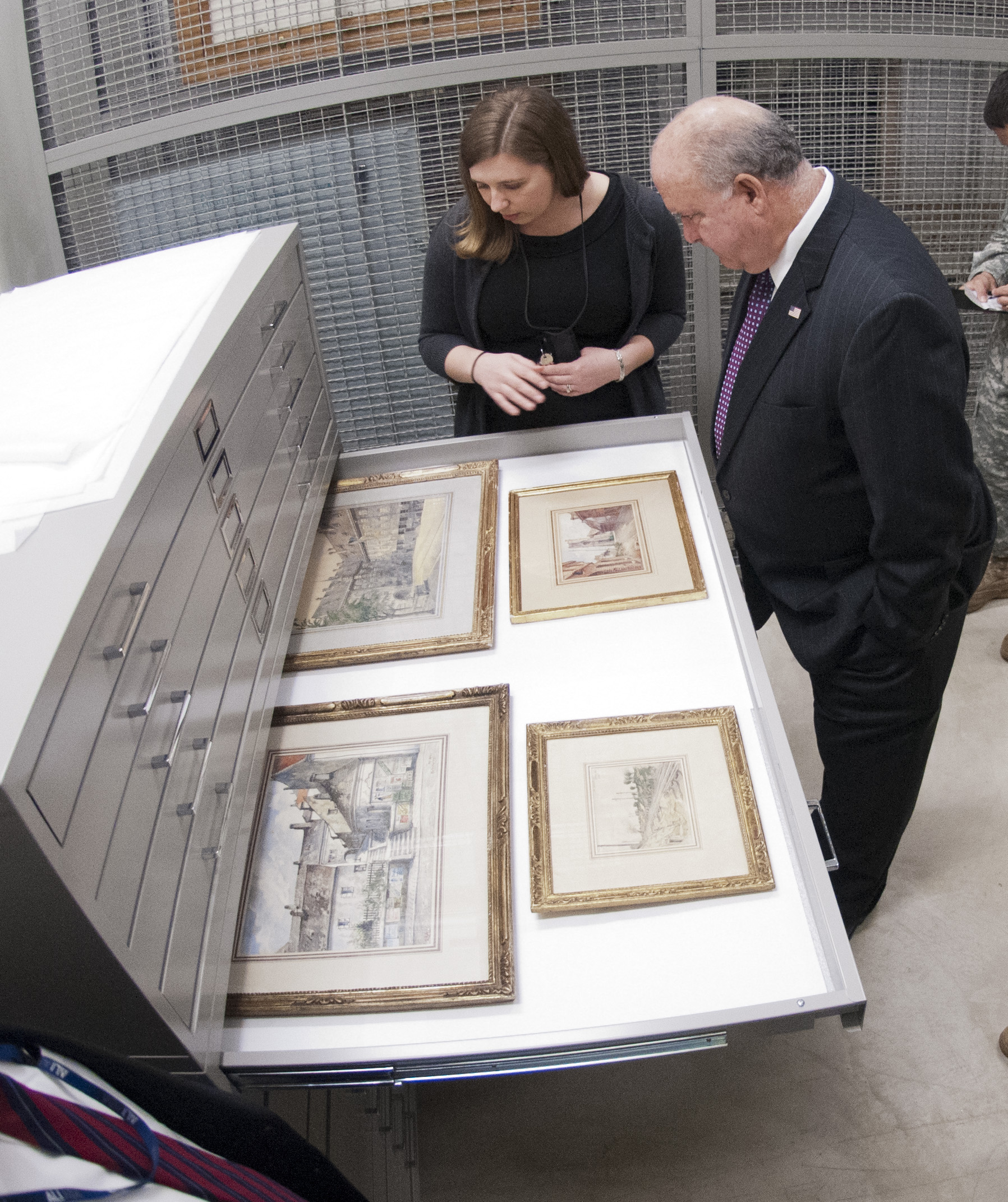
Watercolours by Adolf Hitler at the U.S. Army Center of Military History in May 2012. The paintings were cited in Price v. United States.

In 2015, an auction was held at the Weidler auction house in Nuremberg where 14 paintings dated 1904 to 1922 by Hitler were sold in total for €391,000. A watercolour of Neuschwanstein Castle by Hitler was sold for €100,000 to a buyer from China. A year previously Weidler auction house had sold a Hitler painting to a buyer from the Middle East for around €152,000. In July 2017, Mullock's Auctions sold two oil pictures, one showing a house by a lake, attributed to Hitler. Both are now considered by experts to be forgeries, there being no record of Hitler ever having painted in oils.

A notable collector of pictures by Hitler, and other Nazi-related items, was Henry Thynne, 6th Marquess of Bath. Between the 1960s and the 1980s, he bought over 60 paintings, then comprising the largest collection in the world. An American businessman, Billy Price, amassed another major collection in the 1980s, and attempted to assemble a catalogue raisonné of Hitler's works. The active market in Nazi memorabilia, despite the fact that reputable auction houses will not handle such material, has spawned a thriving corresponding market for forgeries of Hitler's pictures – many of the items held by Bath and Price are believed to be fakes.

== Critical analysis ==
In 1936, after seeing the paintings Hitler submitted to the Vienna art academy, John Gunther, an American journalist and author, wrote, "They are prosaic, utterly devoid of rhythm, color, feeling, or spiritual imagination. They are architect's sketches: painful and precise draftsmanship; nothing more. No wonder the Vienna professors told him to go to an architectural school and give up pure art as hopeless". The directors of the Academy of Fine Arts Vienna who rejected Hitler's application to join noted that he struggled to draw people. In Hitler and the Artists (1983), Henry Grosshans described Hitler's work as "dated, stiff, and with little to commend them save the curiosity aroused by our knowledge of their creator .... [T]here is no life in the work, and these buildings, parks, and monuments are stale and stilted." According to Vienna art historian Birgit Schwarz, Hitler "had no style of his own as a painter, but generally just copied", but the stage designer Edward Gordon Craig and the historian Werner Maser believed Hitler's early paintings showed potential. Author Frederic Spotts argued that while Hitler's technical abilities were good, the lack of people in his paintings ultimately reflected poorly on his skills as an artist and would later have implications for his management of Nazi Germany, both in regards to architecture and his general leadership experience.

In a report entitled The Water Colours of Hitler: Recovered Art Works Homage to Rodolfo Siviero, prepared by Fratelli Alinari, Sergio Salvi rejects the characterisation of Hitler as "a grim Sunday painter" and describes him instead as a "small time professional painter" of "innocuous and trivial urban landscapes". O. K. Werckmeister describes Hitler as an artist "of petty ambition, of failed training, and of no achievement, but an artist all the same", estimating that he produced between 2,000 and 3,000 works between the ages of 18 and 25, when art was his only profession.

== Paintings ==
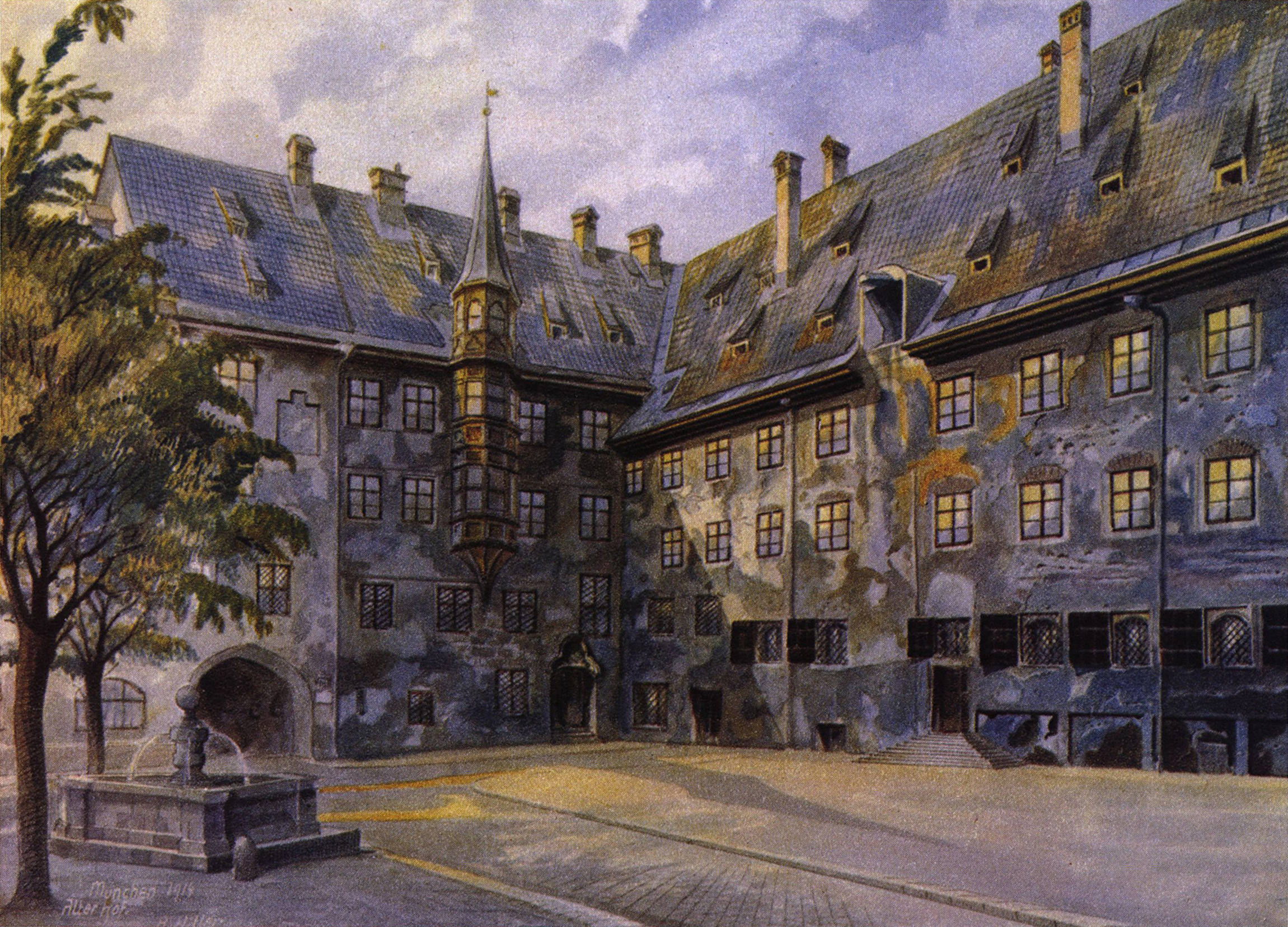
The Courtyard of the Old Residency in Munich, 1914

Working primarily in watercolour, Hitler used the medium to express both his love of painting and architecture. Charles Snyder says that Hitler's watercolours often show detailed attention to architecture in contrast to the conventional and negligent treatment of plants and trees that often frame the subject.

The Courtyard of the Old Residency in Munich (1914) is a watercolour by Hitler depicting the Alter Hof, a stone quad in front of a large manor. During Hitler's time in Munich, he spent most of his days reading and painting, furthering his dream as an independent artist.

The Courtyard... and a few other of his paintings are kept in the basement of the U.S. Army Center of Military History in Washington, D.C., never shown to the public due to their controversial nature.

== Gallery ==
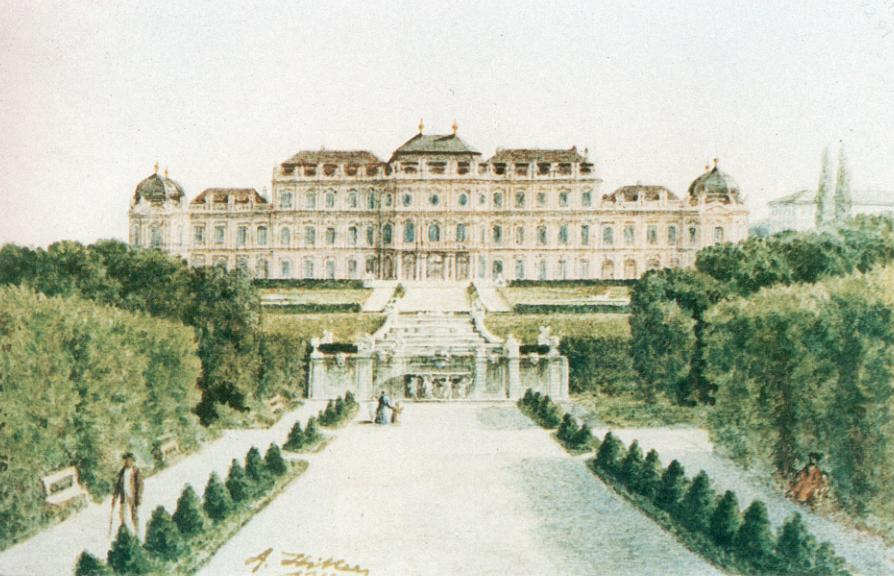
Schloss Belvedere

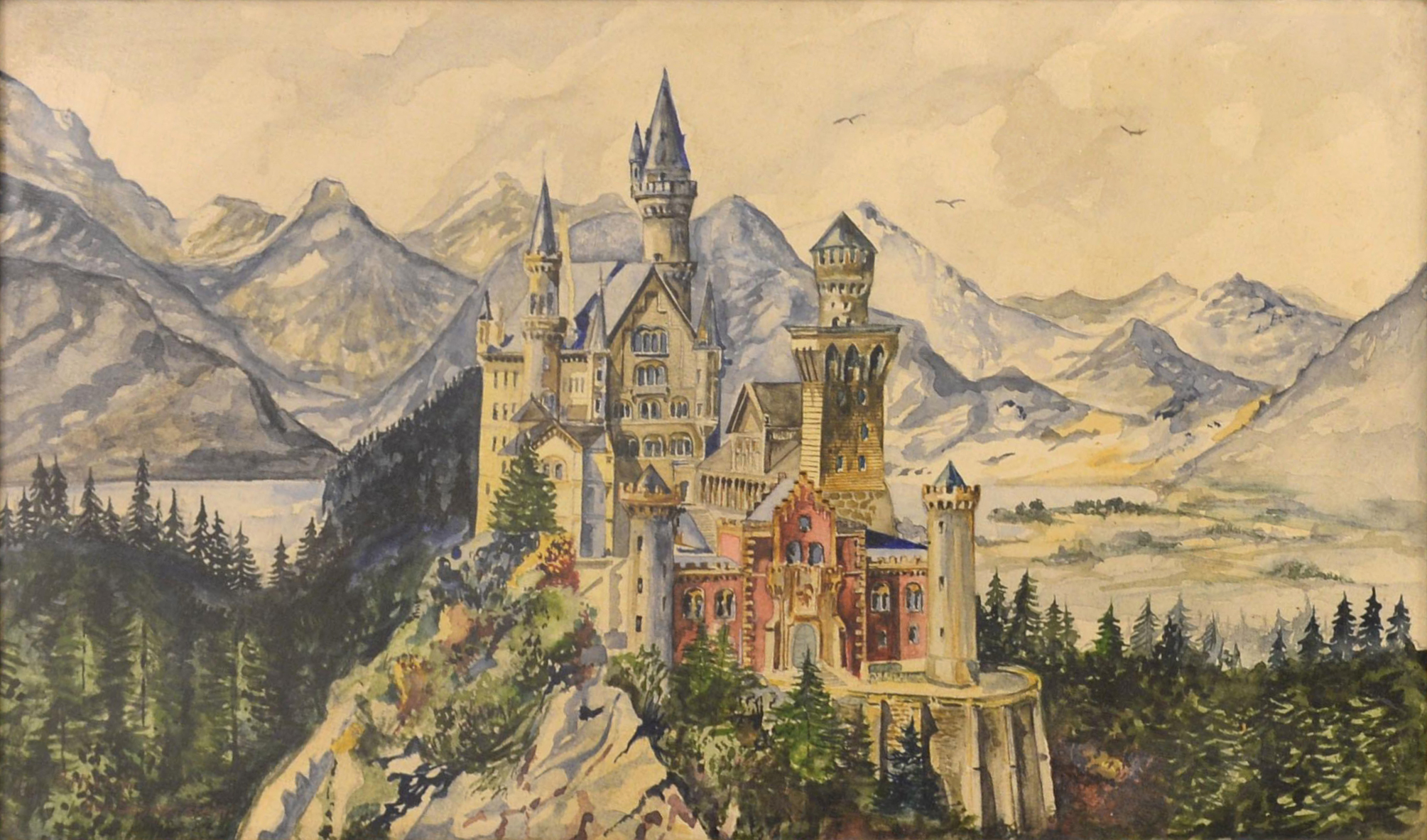
Neuschwanstein Castle (different version)

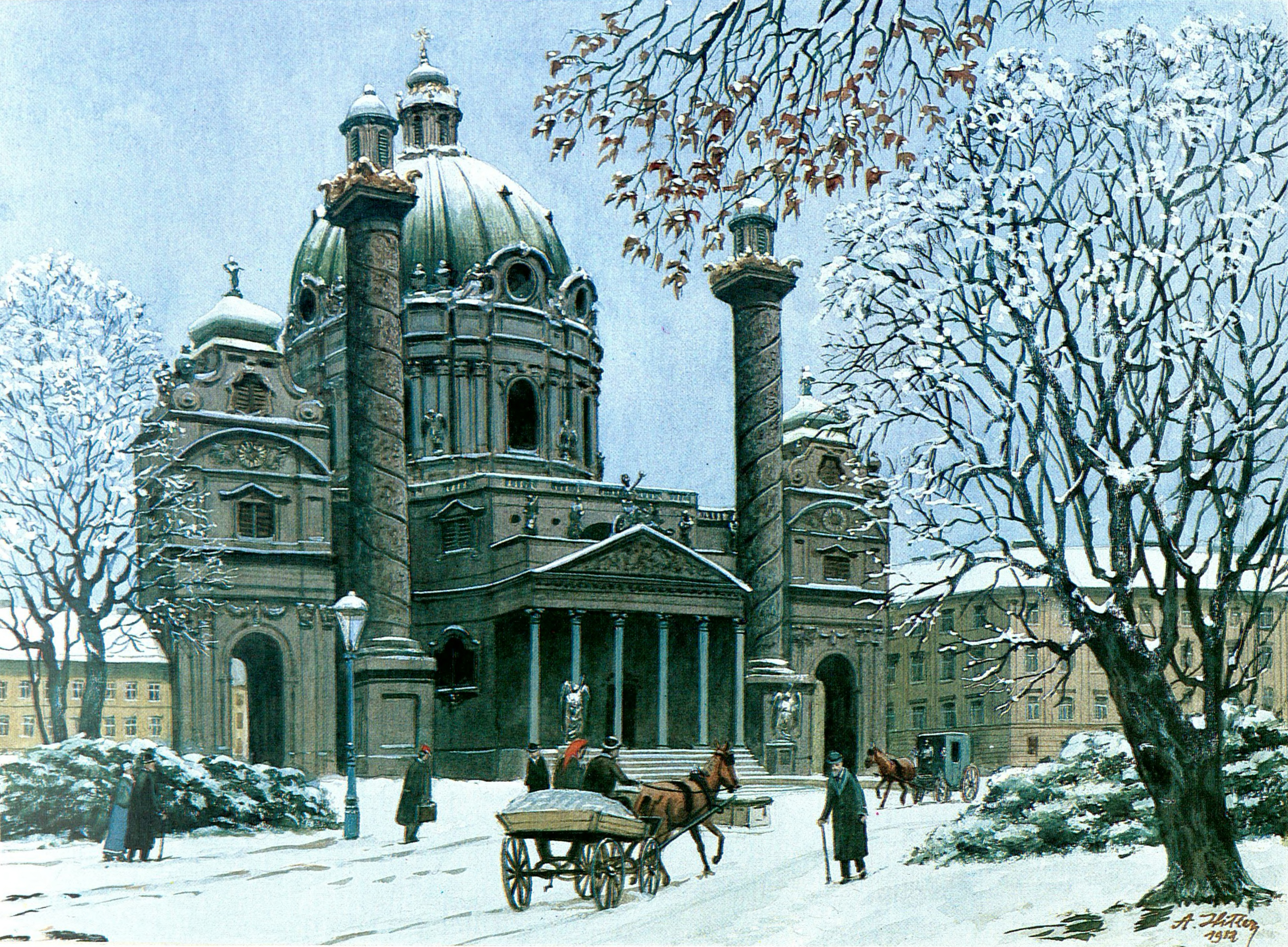
Die Karlskirche im Winter, 1912

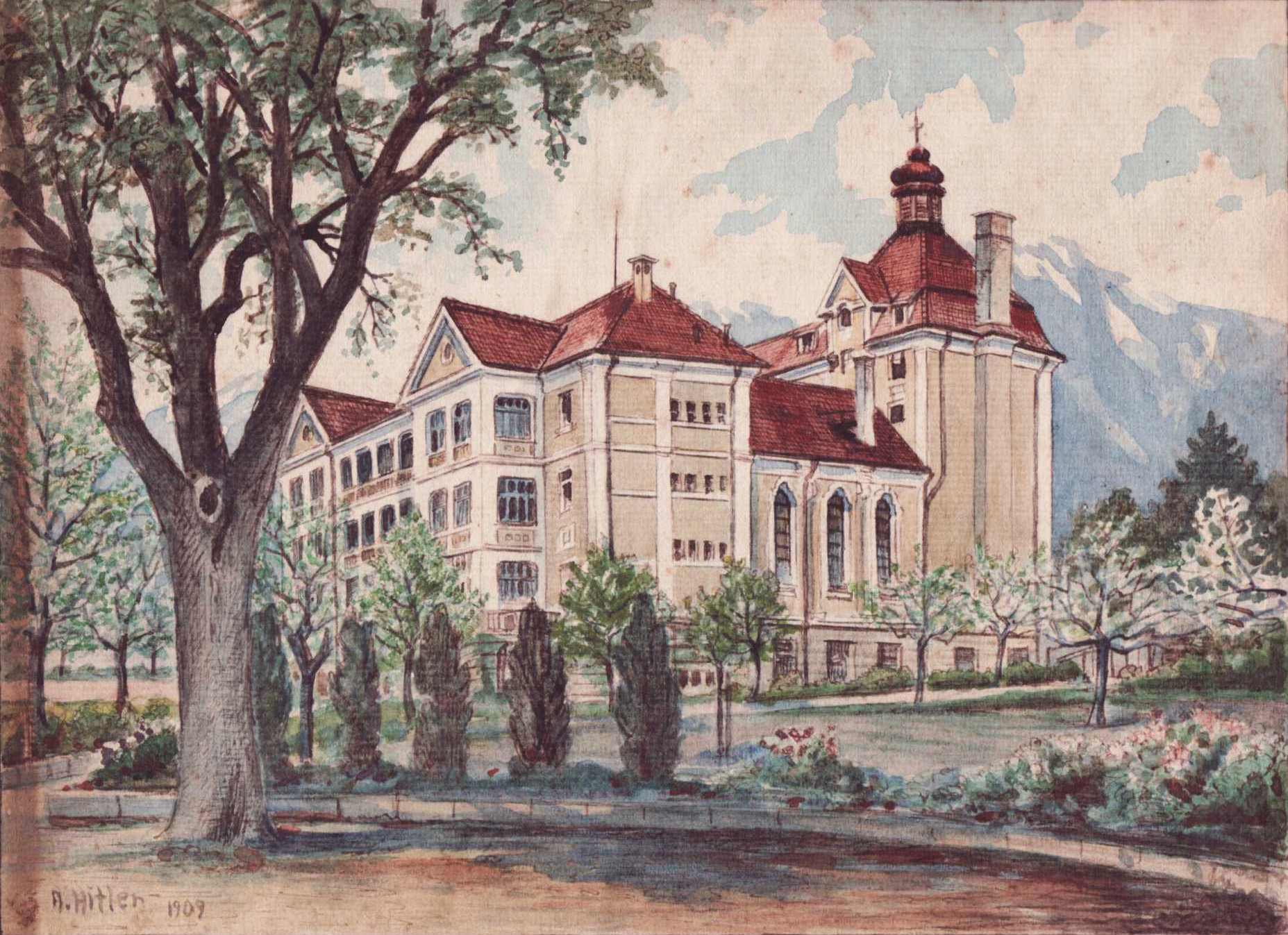
The Old Building in Stand of Trees, 1909

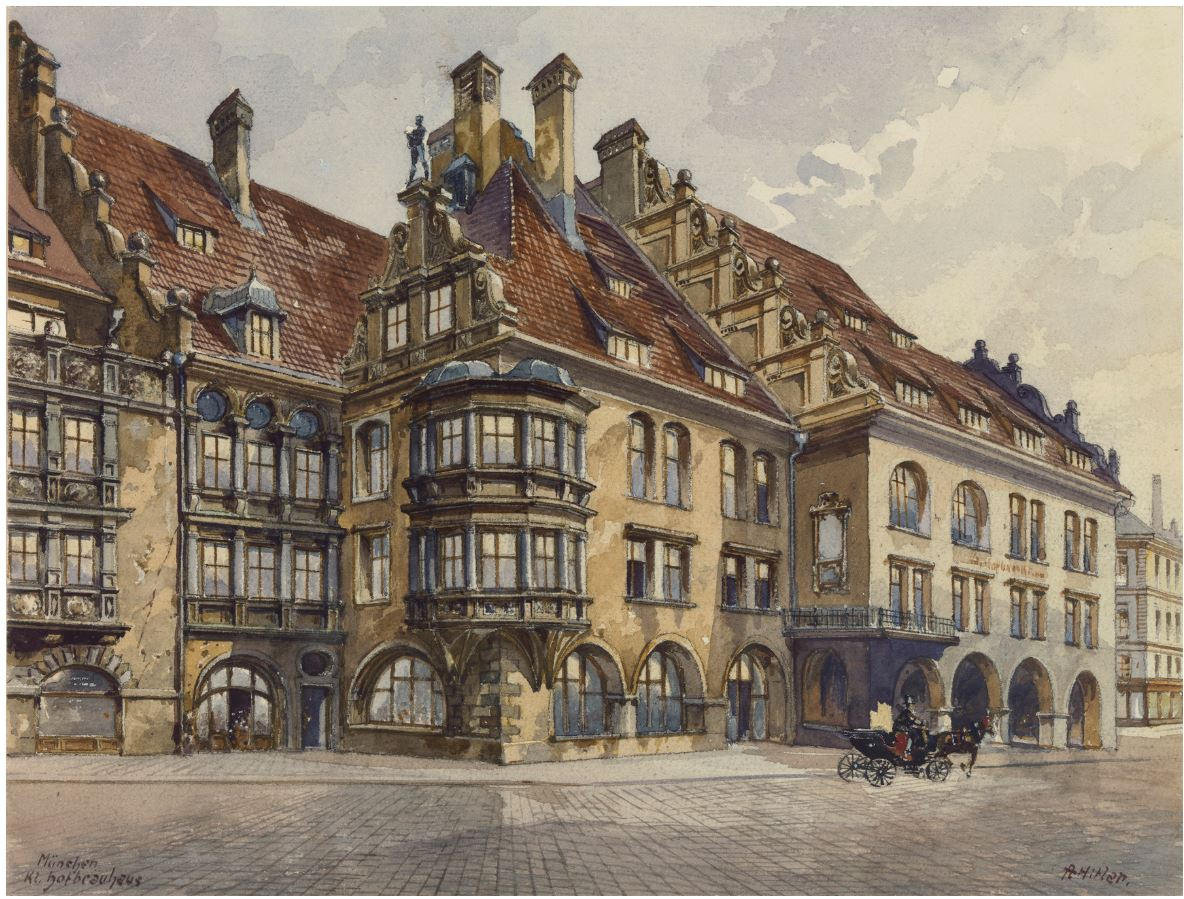
Munich Royal Hofbräuhaus

== See also ==
- "Hitler Painted Roses"
- Winston Churchill as a painter
- Poetry of Joseph Stalin
