= Pendar =

Pendar may refer to:

- Kenneth Pendar (1906–1972), American diplomat
- Mohsen Pezeshkpour (a.k.a. Pendar; c. 1927–2011), Iranian politician
