= Pamela Courson =

Partner of Jim Morrison (1946–1974)

- Born: Pamela Susan Courson; December 22, 1946; Weed, California, U.S.
- Died: April 25, 1974 (aged 27); Los Angeles, California, U.S.
- Resting place: Fairhaven Memorial Park, Santa Ana, California, U.S.
- Partner: Jim Morrison (1965–1971; his death)

Pamela Susan Courson (December 22, 1946 – April 25, 1974) was the long-term companion of Jim Morrison, singer of the Doors. Courson stated she discovered Morrison's body in the bathtub of a Paris apartment in 1971. She died three years after him, in 1974. She was later legally recognized as his common-law wife.

== Early life ==
Courson was born in Weed, California. Her father, Columbus "Corky" Courson (1918–2008), had been a Navy bombardier (attaining the rank of Commander in the U.S. Naval Reserve) before he became a junior high school principal in Villa Park, California. Her mother, Pearl "Penny" Courson (1923–2014), was a homemaker who did interior design. After she died at age 90 in 2014, her New York Times obituary described her as a regular reader of that newspaper, a "staunch liberal" and a "connoisseur of the arts". Courson had one sibling, a sister named Judith, who died in 2018. She attended Orange High School in Orange, California.

== Involvement with Morrison ==
Courson and Jim Morrison met at the London Fog nightclub on the Sunset Strip in 1966, while she was an art student at Los Angeles City College. In his 1998 memoir, Light My Fire: My Life with The Doors, keyboardist Ray Manzarek stated that Courson and a friend saw the band during their stint at the London Fog.

Morrison and Courson had an open relationship, at times very charged and intense, and also described as "on-again, off-again" as both maintained ongoing relationships with others, while also being strongly committed to each other in their own way. One of Courson's more significant, ongoing relationships was with Jean de Breteuil, a French nobleman and drug dealer. Morrison hated heroin and would become angry at Courson for using it, although Marianne Faithfull and others claimed that Morrison ultimately died of a heroin overdose supplied by de Breteuil.

From 1969 to 1971, Courson operated Themis, a fashion boutique that Morrison bought for her with his royalties from the album Strange Days.

It has been rumored that Neil Young wrote the song "Cinnamon Girl" about her, as well as "The Needle and the Damage Done", but both have been denied.

== Death of Morrison and aftermath ==
Courson stated that on July 3, 1971, she awoke to find Morrison dead in the bathtub of their apartment in Paris. The coroner's report listed his cause of death as heart failure, although no autopsy was performed. According to Morrison's will at the time, which stated that he was "an unmarried person", Courson was named his heir, and therefore in line to inherit his entire fortune. Legal objections to Morrison's will delayed its execution for three years. Early in 1974, Morrison's will was executed as per his wishes, and Courson inherited his entire estate shortly before her own death in April of the same year.

Friend Diane Gardner is quoted as saying in the book Break on Through by Riordan and Prochnicky:

Pam was one of the funniest people I ever met. She was beautiful, she looked like the Snow Queen and yet she did things like collect Lugers. She had a vicious sense of humor. She loved travel because she said you never had to think about it. When you were traveling and you were a tourist, you got up and life happened to you. I liked her. She was the most dangerous girl I ever met. After Jim died and we were both just out of our heads we would do things like go to Tijuana and get crazy. We'd check into sleazy hotels and go down to Rosarito Beach and drink everything in sight.

== Death and estate controversy ==
After Morrison's death, Courson continued to live in Los Angeles. Former Doors manager Danny Sugerman became friendly with her in Los Angeles during this time and later wrote in Wonderland Avenue: Tales of Glamour and Excess about an experience of taking quaaludes and snorting heroin with Courson.

On April 25, 1974, Courson died of a heroin overdose on the living room couch at the Los Angeles apartment she shared with two male friends. Like Morrison, she was 27 years old when she died. Her cremated remains were interred in the mausoleum at Fairhaven Memorial Park in Santa Ana, California. The plaque reads "Pamela Susan Morrison 1946–1974", even though "Morrison" was never part of Courson's legal name. Several months after her death, her parents inherited her fortune. Jim Morrison's parents later contested the Coursons' executorship of the estate, leading to additional legal battles. In 1979 both parties agreed to divide the earnings from Morrison's estate equally.

== In popular culture ==
Courson was portrayed by Meg Ryan in Oliver Stone's 1991 film The Doors.

The relationship Courson and Morrison had with actor Tom Baker was described in a memoir, Blue Centre Light. An extract was published in High Times in June 1981.

The stormy friendship between Courson, Morrison and Baker is depicted in the stage play The Lizard King, written by Jay Jeff Jones, which was produced in Los Angeles in 1991. Actress Kristina Starman played Courson. Clay Wilcox played Baker and Jim Morrison was played by Stephen Nichols.

== See also ==
- Outline of the Doors
- Common-law marriage in the United States
- Posthumous marriage
