= Price v. United States =

United States Court of Appeals case

- Court: United States Court of Appeals for the Fifth Circuit
- Full case name: Billy F. Price, et al. v. United States of America
- Decided: November 20, 1995
- Citations: 69 F.3d 46 (5th Cir. 1995), decision on rehearing 81 F.3d 520 (5th Cir. 1996)

Court membership
- Judges sitting: Harlington Wood, Jr., E. Grady Jolly, and Harold R. DeMoss, Jr.

Price v. United States (1995) was a lawsuit concerning the ownership of certain artwork seized by the United States in Germany in the aftermath of World War II. It was decided by the United States Court of Appeals for the Fifth Circuit, which overturned an initial judgment of the District Court for the Southern District of Texas. The decision was based on the definition of the tort of conversion and the applicability of the principle of sovereign immunity.

Among the artwork that formed the subject matter of the lawsuit were many photographs by German photographer Heinrich Hoffmann.

== Background ==
The Court of Appeals described Price as "a Texas businessman" and noted that Price had described himself on the cover of a self-published book as the "owner of one of the largest collections of Hitler art and an internationally acknowledged expert on the subject."

The property in dispute was a number of works of art which had been owned by Heinrich Hoffmann (1885–1957), a German photographer who was best known for his many published photographs of Adolf Hitler. The Court of Appeals considered the property in three distinct categories:

- four watercolor paintings by Hitler that had been purchased by (and/or given to) Hoffmann;
- a photographic archive compiled by Hoffmann and his son, including many iconic images of Nazi Germany, which had been ceded to the U.S. National Archives and Records Administration (NARA) after its seizure by U.S. forces in occupied Germany;
- a much smaller photographic archive, known as the "Carlisle archive," which had been ceded to the U.S. Military History Institute in Carlisle, Pennsylvania, by Time-Life, Inc.

Price had purchased the property from Hoffmann's heirs in Germany in the early 1980s and then demanded the US government to turn it over to him. When the US government refused, he filed the lawsuit on August 9, 1983.

== District Court ==
The United States District Court for the Southern District of Texas denied a motion by the U.S. government in February 1989 to have the case dismissed and entered a partial summary judgment in Price's favor. It chastised the government for its defense strategy: "Instead of property law arguments, the government relie[d] upon political denigration of the artist and the archivist." The District Court awarded Price almost $8 million in damages from the United States' conversion of the paintings and archives, including Price's loss of use of the property from 1983. Both sides appealed the District Court judgment, with Price claiming $41 million in damages.

== Court of Appeal ==
The United States Court of Appeals for the Fifth Circuit upheld the appeal of the US government in November 1995 and rejected Price's appeal. It ruled that the United States was entitled to sovereign immunity against tort claims unless it had been expressly waived. By distinct reasoning, it found that there was no waiver for either the watercolors or the photographic archive.

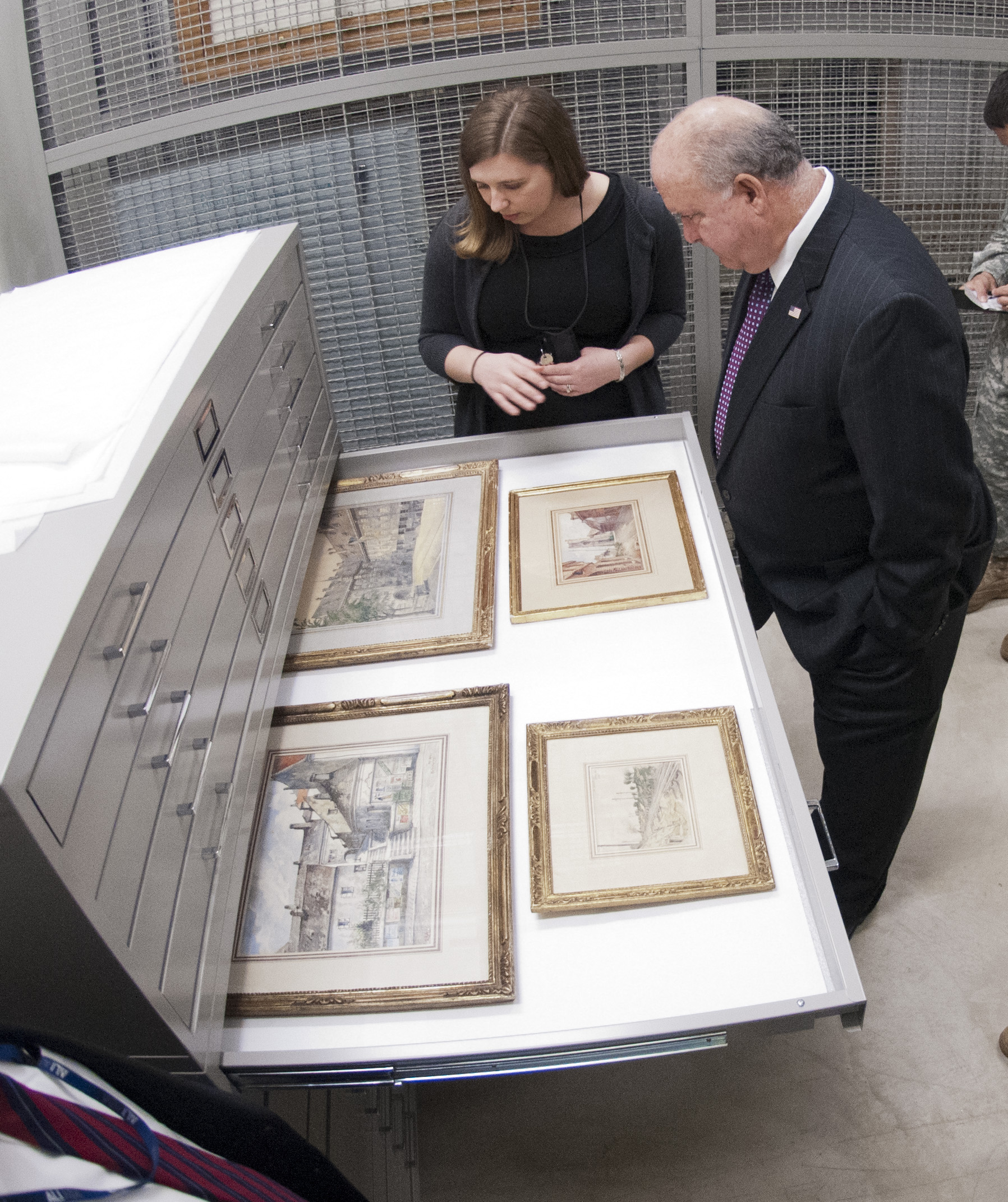
The watercolors involved the dispute housed in storage at the Army Center of Military History. Upper right watercolor is the Courtyard of the Old Residency in Munich.

=== Watercolors ===
The four watercolors by Adolf Hitler had been stored (along with other artwork) in a castle during World War II, and were discovered by the U.S. Army as it occupied Germany. They were originally transferred to a central collecting point in Munich, where they were registered and cataloged. The Hitler watercolors were classified as "military objects" and transferred from Munich to Wiesbaden, and then to the United States around June 1950. Other artwork which belonged to Hoffmann was returned to him.

The Court did not rule on the legality of the "confiscation". Instead, it found that the (allegedly) tortious act, the act that went against the owner's interests, occurred when the watercolors were separated from the rest of Hoffmann's property and sent from Munich to Wiesbaden. As the act occurred in Germany, a claim in the US federal courts was debarred under the Federal Tort Claims Act, specifically 28 U.S.C. § 2680(k).

=== Photographic archive ===
The main photographic archive had been used in evidence at the Nuremberg Trials and was shipped to the United States "around the time of the Berlin Airlift" (1948–1949). On June 25, 1951, the Attorney General, acting pursuant to the Trading with the Enemy Act 1917, 50 U.S.C.App. § 1–33, vested in himself all rights in the photographs and photographic images "to be held, used, administered, liquidated, sold, or otherwise dealt with in the interest of and for the benefit of the United States." The archive was later transferred to the United States National Archives.

The Federal Tort Claims Act specifically excludes claims arising from the administration of the Trading with the Enemy Act (28 U.S.C. § 2680(w)). Price attempted to overcome that hurdle by challenging the validity of the vesting order, but the Court found that the time limit for such claims had long since passed. As such, the Court of Appeal ruled that the District Court had no subject matter jurisdiction over Price's claim.

=== Carlisle archive ===
The Carlisle archive is much smaller and less historically significant than the main photographic archive, and its history is less clear. The photographs appear to have been removed from Germany in the late 1940s by or on behalf of Time magazine. The publishers of Time then passed them on to the U.S. Army between 1981 and 1983.

The Court of Appeal found that Price's claim concerning the Carlisle archive was untimely. The Federal Tort Claims Act requires that a plaintiff must have received a written denial from the government or waited six months before starting a lawsuit (28 U.S.C. § 2675(a)). As Price had not fulfilled that requirement, there was no waiver of sovereign immunity.
