= Alter Hof =

Former ducal residence in Munich

Coordinates: 48°08′17″N 11°34′41″E

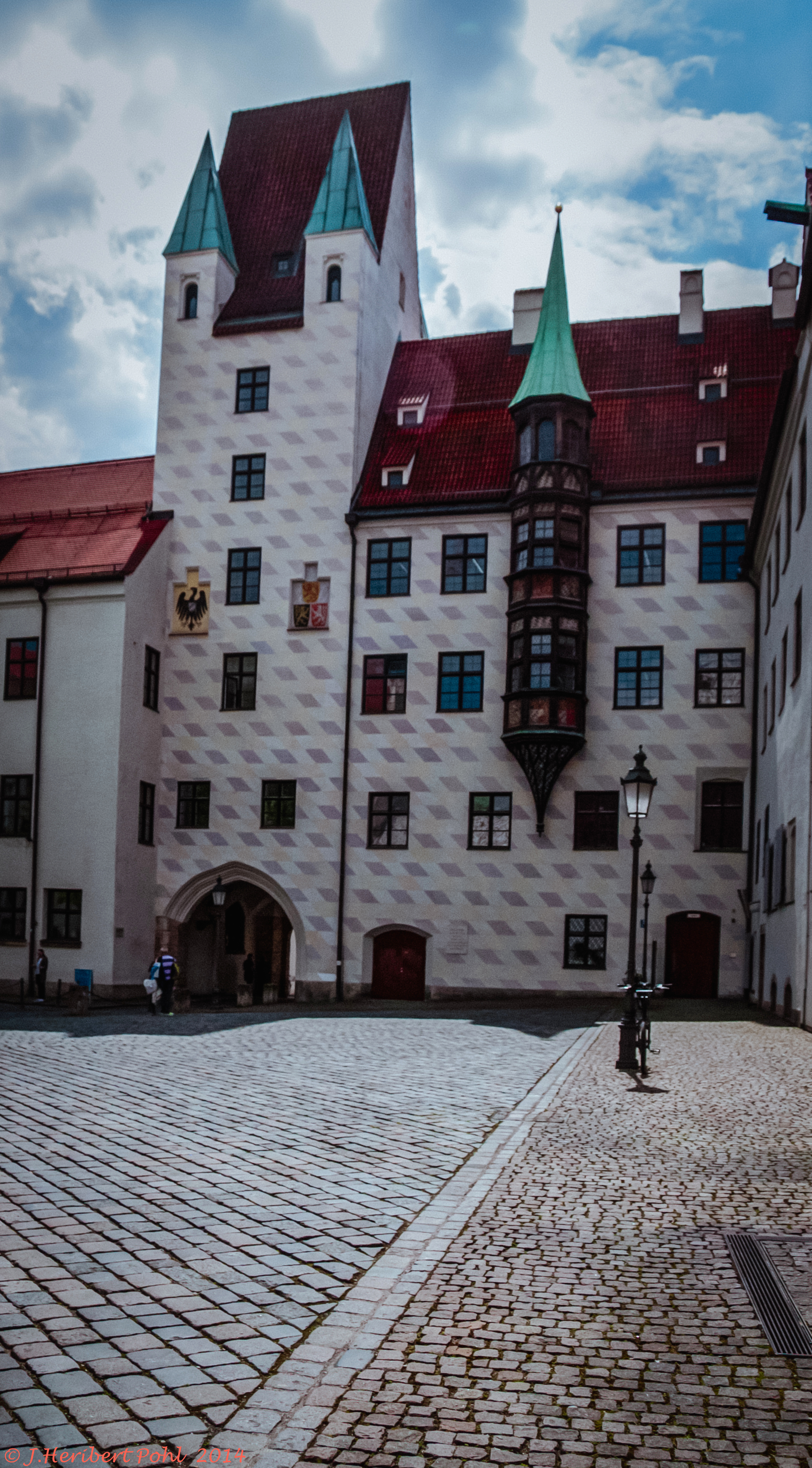
Alter Hof (Burgstock)

The Alter Hof (Old Court) in the center of Munich is the former imperial residence of Louis IV, Holy Roman Emperor and consists of five wings: Burgstock, Zwingerstock, Lorenzistock, Pfisterstock and Brunnenstock. Like most of the old town, it was rebuilt after being destroyed in World War II.

== History ==
Archeological excavations have shown that a castle already existed there in the 12th century. After the first partition of Bavaria in 1255, the Alte Hof became the residence of Louis II, Duke of Bavaria in the then very northeastern part of the city. The castle was the first permanent imperial residence in the Holy Roman Empire under his son Louis IV, Holy Roman Emperor. The St. Lorenz Chapel at the north side, which was demolished later in the 19th century, once housed the regalia of the House of Wittelsbach.

After some uprisings the castle became too unsafe, and in the course of an extension of the town, together with the construction of a new double-ring of town walls, the Wittelsbach dukes once again chose the very northeastern corner as the construction site for a replacement ducal residence. Consequently, as it was newly erected, the castle was called "Neuveste", new fortress. Over the course of centuries, the Neuveste would eventually develop into what is nowadays the Munich Residenz. When Duke Sigismund lived in the Alter Hof at the end of the fifteenth century and made further structural alterations to it, including painting in the courtyard with lozenge-shaped decoration, the actual residence was already the Neuveste. In the first half of the 16th century, Duke William IV finally transferred the residence permanently to the Neuveste. Thus from the 16th century onwards, the Alter Hof was only seat of several governmental departments including the stewardship.

In 1591–92, the Pfisterstock was built with decorative gables typical of the Renaissance; it was attributed to Wilhelm Egkl. In the first half of the 17th century, a building for the brewhouse and the brewhouse office, which had been known as the Brunnenstock since the end of the 18th century, was built. This was then replaced by Georg Friedrich Ziebland in 1831/32 by a new building on the old foundations for the Steering Commission. At the beginning of the 19th century, St.Lorenz chapel was broken off. The tower was also removed but later rebuilt. Instead of the church, the neoclassical Lorenzistock was built along the Hofgraben street in 1816–1819. In 1914, Adolf Hitler made a painting of the Alter Hof known as The Courtyard of the Old Residency in Munich.

== Restoration and tourism ==
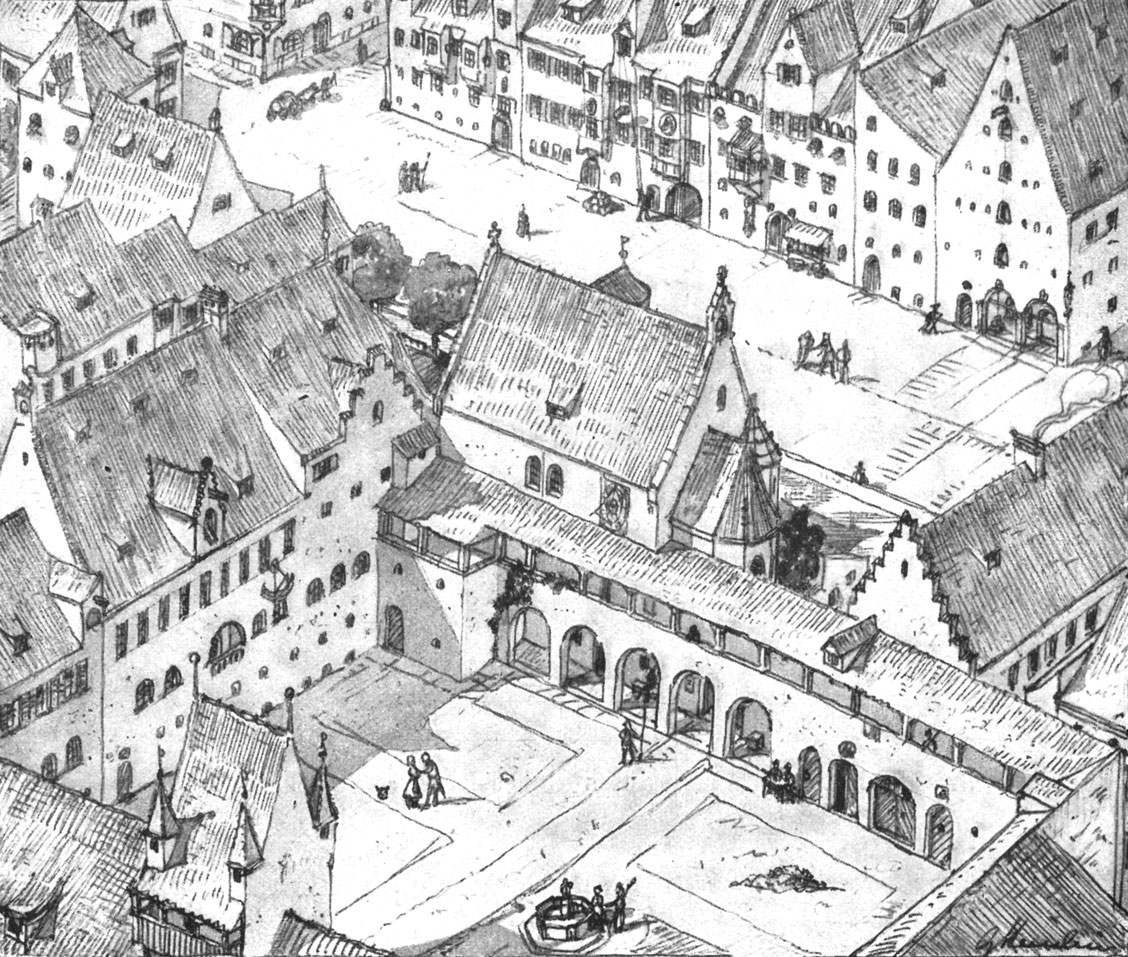
Reconstruktion of Alter Hof as of 1570

The late Gothic westwings (the Burgstock with its tower and its decorated oriel window and the Zwingerstock), which were altered under Duke Sigismund have been preserved. After destructions in World War II the castle was reconstructed. Portions of it (Lorenzistock, Pfisterstock and Brunnenstock) were redeveloped in post modernist style to serve as offices and luxury apartments in 2005/2006, very much to public dismay.

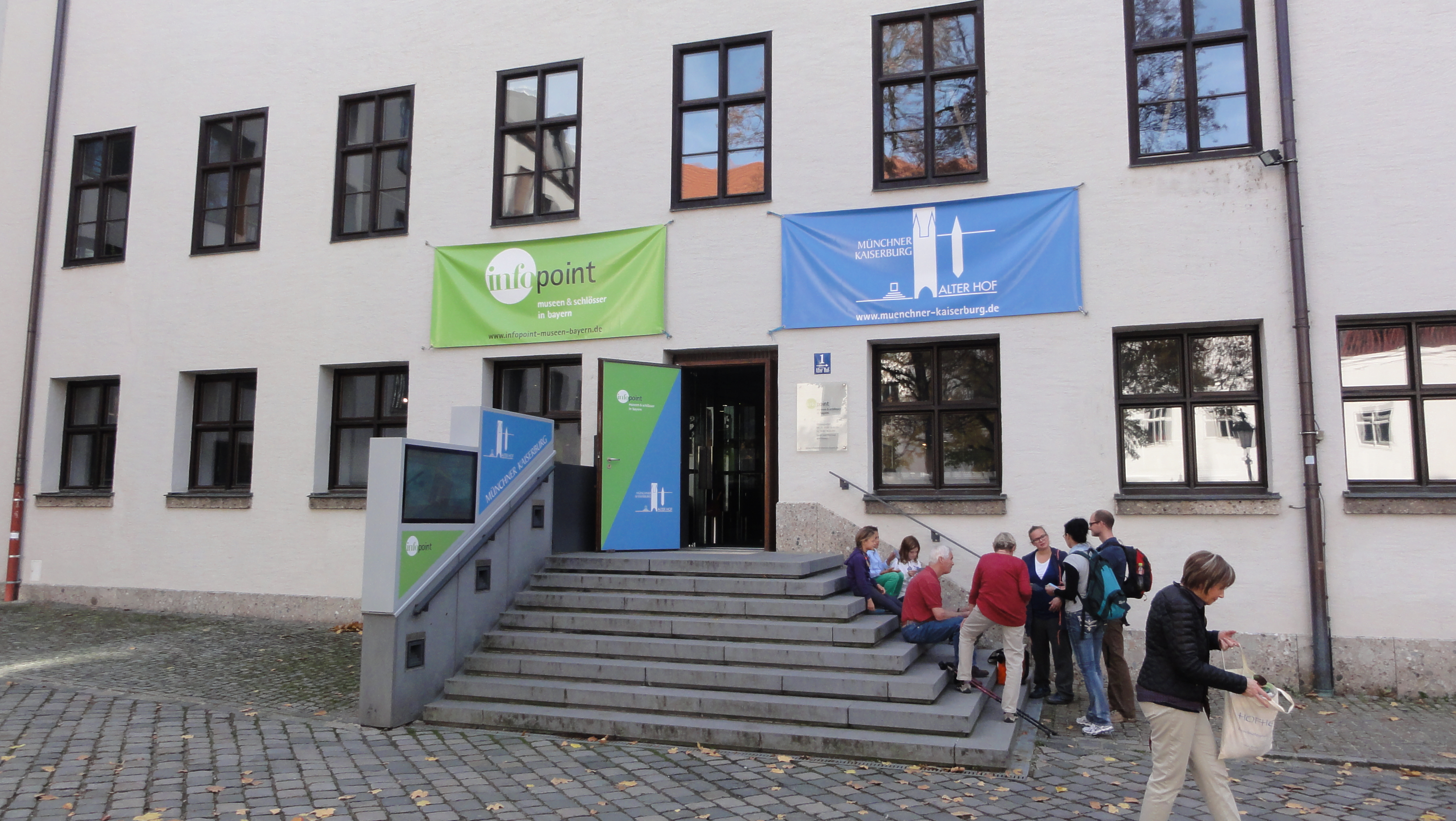
Entrance of the Infopoint Museen & Schlösser in Bayern, a central information point for the 1300 museums and palaces throughout Bavaria

The exhibition Münchner Kaiserburg (The Imperial Castle in Munich) can be found in the basement floor of the Infopoint. It is located in the old vaulted cellar dating back to around 1300. A short film (german/english) illustrates the history of the Old Court, the city of Munich and the life and rule of its well-known resident Louis IV, Holy Roman Emperor. The exhibition also tells the legend of the oriel window on the westwing, which by locals is called "Affentürmchen" (Monkey Tower).

Into the Bavarian National Museum were moved the donation plate from 1324, a relief depicting the Emperor Louis and his second wife Margaret of Holland, with the enthroned Mother of God with the child in the center, which was formerly on the north side of the nave, as well as a fresco for an ancestral hall, dating back to 1460, depicting the ancestors of the Wittelsbach dukes with their coat of arms.

== The mint yard (Alte Münze) ==
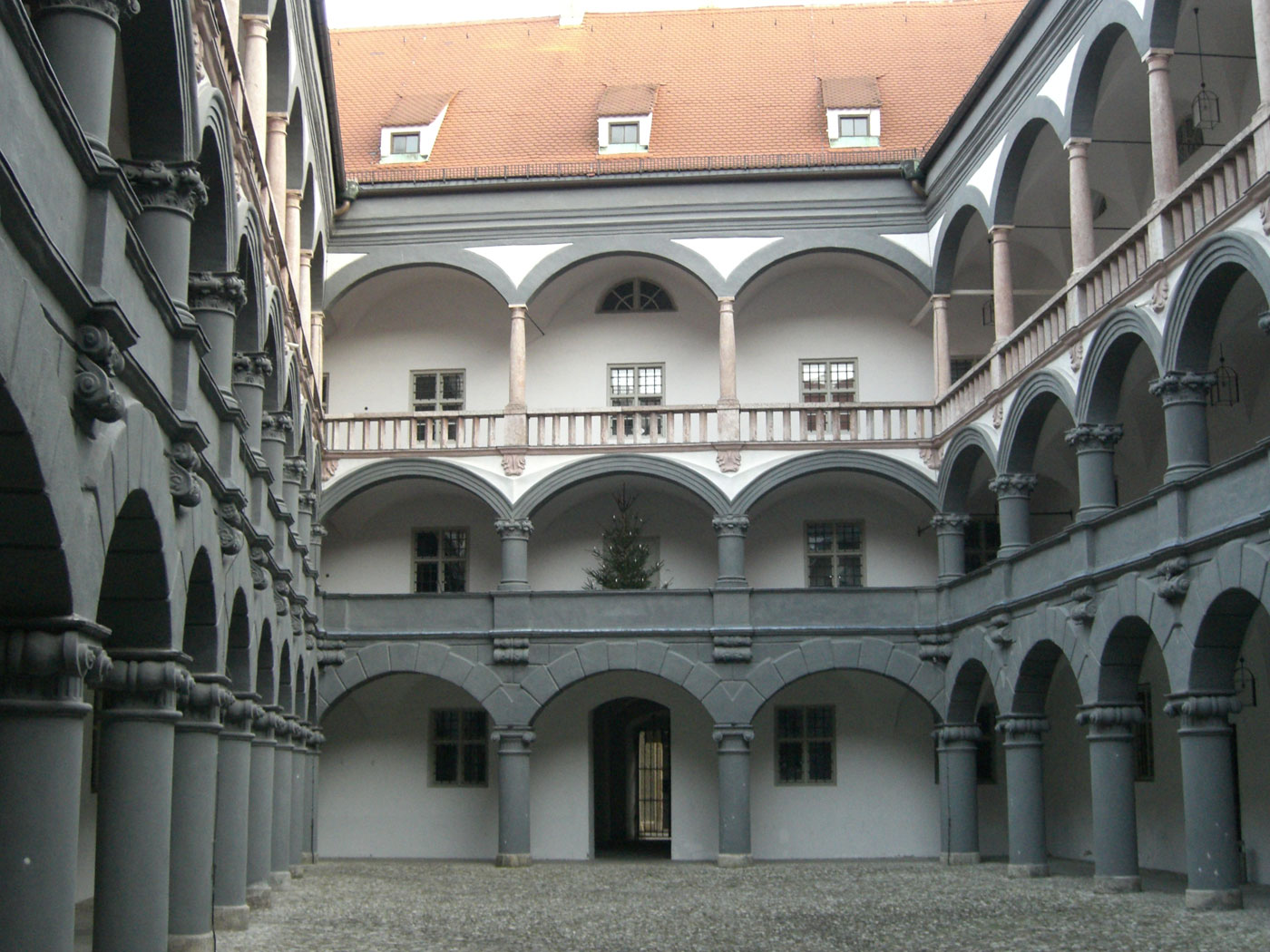
The mint yard

An arch in the north connects the Alter Hof with a Renaissance style building which originally served for the ducal stables and the art collections of Albert V, Duke of Bavaria. It was constructed by court architect Wilhelm Egkl in 1563. Later it served as mint. The inner courtyard has kept its renaissance arcades while the west facade was redesigned in neoclassical style in 1809. Finally the north facade facing got its neogothic decoration when the Maximilianstrasse was built to fit it with the concept of this royal avenue.
