= No One Here Gets Out Alive =

1980 biography of Jim Morrison

- Authors: Jerry Hopkins; Danny Sugerman
- Language: English
- Subject: Jim Morrison
- Publication date: 1980
- Publication place: United States
- Media type: Print
- Pages: 396
- ISBN: 978-0-446-60228-0

No One Here Gets Out Alive was the first biography about the lead singer and lyricist of the rock band the Doors, Jim Morrison, published in 1980. Its title is taken from a line in the Doors' song "Five to One", and the book is divided into three sections: The Bow is Drawn, The Arrow Flies and The Arrow Falls, for the early years of Morrison's life, his rise to fame with the Doors, and then his final years and death. The book was written by Jerry Hopkins and Danny Sugerman.

A companion video was made featuring interviews with the surviving members of the Doors, Hopkins, Sugerman and Paul A. Rothchild among others. It includes some rare footage and was the first video released by the band. It helped rekindle interest in the Doors by allowing fans that were too young or unable to remember, to see the Doors in action. Upon release, No One Here Gets Out Alive reached No. 1 on all best-seller lists, and it had sold over five million copies by 1995.

No One Here Gets Out Alive was heavily criticized by several people for its historical inaccuracies, and for ambiguously suggesting that Morrison may have faked his own death. Among those people were Rothchild who claimed that Sugerman had changed some of his statements while he was interviewed by Hopkins. (Note: Rothchild mentioned for example in a 1981 interview with BAM that in the book he is quoted as saying that he thought "Riders on the Storm" sounded like "cocktail music", when in fact he digressed that he actually applied this moniker to "Love Her Madly".) Doors' guitarist Robby Krieger said in response to the book that Sugerman "had his own ideas about what happened and various situations. He kind of put his own words into it, and what really annoyed me was that he tried to make Jim sound like he was talking through Danny, and it wasn't the way Jim really was."

== Background ==
Published nearly a decade after Morrison's death by journalist Jerry Hopkins, the first draft was written solely by Hopkins, based on extensive interviews with Morrison. But attempts to find a publisher during the years when the Doors were no longer popular, met with rejections from all major publishing houses. Eight years after Morrison’s death, the second version of the manuscript, with additional sensationalistic content, (Note: Such as Sugerman's baseless suggestion that Morrison had faked his own death, and other speculations. In a 1989 interview with Pat Cheffer, Sugerman said that he didn't intend to leave the reader with the certainty that Morrison faked his death, but that he only mentioned it for the sake of completeness and he maintained was "journalistically responsible to point out" all the versions and theories surrounding his death.) added by Danny Sugerman, made executives of Warner Books, part of the entertainment conglomerate then known as Warner Communications, decide to publish and to sell the book in 1980.

Sugerman had begun working as an assistant in the Doors office at the age of 12 in 1967 and became the manager for the remaining members after Morrison died.

The book's publication, following the 1978 release of Morrison's posthumous spoken word album (with music by the Doors) An American Prayer, the prominent use of Doors music on the 1979 soundtrack for the film Apocalypse Now, and the 1980 release of the band's Greatest Hits album, all combined to bring the Doors and Morrison back into the popular culture.

== Publication data ==
- No One Here Gets Out Alive (1980), Jerry Hopkins and Danny Sugerman
  - 1980 Plexus Publishing hardcover: ISBN 0-85965-039-1
  - 1980 Plexus Publishing paperback: ISBN 0-85965-038-3
  - 1991 Plexus Publishing hardcover: ISBN 0-85965-306-4
  - 1991 Plexus Publishing paperback: ISBN 0-85965-138-X
  - updated 1995 Warner mass market paperback: ISBN 0-446-60228-0
  - 1995 Time Warner AudioBook: ISBN 1-57042-308-3
  - 1997 Barnes & Noble edition: ISBN 0-7607-0618-2
