= Tower of the Koutoubia Mosque =

1943 painting by Winston Churchill

- Artist: Winston Churchill
- Year: 1943
- Medium: Oil on canvas
- Dimensions: 51 cm × 61 cm (20 in × 24 in)
- Location: Private collection

Tower of the Koutoubia Mosque is an oil on canvas painting by Winston Churchill, from 1943. It depicts a view of the Kutubiyya Mosque, in Marrakesh. The painting, the only one Churchill undertook during the Second World War, was completed on 25/26 January 1943, during a visit to the city by Churchill and President Franklin D. Roosevelt, following the Casablanca Conference. Churchill subsequently presented the picture to Roosevelt. It was later owned by Angelina Jolie. At its sale in 2021 the picture was described by Christie's as "Churchill's most important work" and achieved the highest ever auction price for a painting by Churchill.

== History ==
We are here in a fairyland villa in Marrakech. Weather brilliant. Am going to paint a little this afternoon from roof of the same view of the pink gateway. My friend has gone.

— Churchill's telegram of 25 January 1943 to his wife, referencing his painting plans. His "friend" was Franklin Roosevelt.

Churchill had first visited Morocco in the winter of 1935-1936. Disappointed by constant rain in Tangier over Christmas, he relocated to the city of Marrakech for the New Year. Despite initial reservations; “the crowds, the smells and the general discomfort for painting have repelled me”; he stayed for three weeks and came to love the city he termed ‘The Paris of the Sahara’. (Note: Churchill later described his Moroccan paintings as, “a cut above anything I have ever done so far”.) Finding it conducive both to work and to painting, he wrote to his wife, Clementine, recording the newspaper articles and book chapters dictated, and the seven pictures completed among “brilliant sunshine, translucent air and swarms of picturesque inhabitants”. After the Casablanca Conference, some seven years later, he persuaded an initially reluctant Roosevelt to accompany him on a trip to Marrakech. Here, on 25/26 January 1943, he painted Tower of the Koutoubia Mosque. Churchill worked on the picture from the balcony of the city's Villa Taylor, where he and Roosevelt had stayed. Martin Gilbert, in the 7th volume of his authorised biography, Road To Victory: Winston S. Churchill: 1941-1945, records it as "the only picture he painted during the whole war". Churchill himself described the event in the fourth volume of his memoirs of the Second World War, The Hinge of Fate; “I returned to the Villa Taylor, where I spent another two days in correspondence with the War Cabinet about my future movements, and painting from the tower the only picture I ever attempted during the war.” Tower of the Koutoubia Mosque was later given to President Roosevelt as a birthday present. (Note: Churchill ultimately gave away some one hundred of his pictures, about a fifth of the total, although he was initially reluctant to do so: “They are too bad to sell and too dear to me to give”.)

The painting was inherited by Roosevelt's son Elliot who sold it to George W. Woodward of Nebraska in 1950. It was purchased by Norman G. Hickman of New York in 1964. Hickman was a financier, collector and film producer, who had worked on The Finest Hours, a documentary on Churchill’s life. During Hickman’s ownership, the painting was exhibited at the National Churchill Museum at Fulton, Missouri. It remained in his family's ownership until it was placed with M.S. Rau Antiques of New Orleans in 2011. (Note: Norman Hickman is recorded as the owner at the time of the publication of David Coombs' catalogue raisonné of Churchill's paintings, published in 1967.) It was then bought by the actress Angelina Jolie. (Note: Some sources suggest that the painting was purchased by Brad Pitt, as a present for Jolie.)

In March 2021, the painting was sold by Jolie at a Christie's auction for £8.285 million, a record for a painting by Churchill. (Note: The sale included two other lots by Churchill; Scene at Marrakech, a gift to General Montgomery, which sold for £1.9 million, and St Paul’s Churchyard, which raised £1.1 million.) It was described by Christie’s as "Churchill's most important work". (Note: The details of the purchaser in 2021 have not been made public.) The previous record price for a picture by Churchill was £1.765 million, achieved in 2014 for The Goldfish Pool at Chartwell (1932).

== Description ==
The painting is oil on canvas, is 20" high and 24" wide, and bears Churchill's initials. It depicts a distant view of the Marrakesh medina, with the city walls in the middle-distance, the Bab Doukkala gate to the left, with the minaret of the Bab Doukkala Mosque behind, the Kutubiyya Mosque to the right, and the Atlas Mountains in the background. The picture is recorded as No.381 in the catalogue raisonné, Churchill: his paintings, prepared by the art historian David Coombs after Churchill's death and published in 1967.

== Sources ==
- Cannadine, David (2018). Churchill: The Statesman As Artist. London: Bloomsbury Continuum. ISBN 978-1-472-94521-1. OCLC 1057460760.
- Churchill, Winston (1951). The Hinge of Fate. The Second World War. Vol. IV. London: Cassell & Co. LTD. OCLC 973429324.
- —; Churchill, Clementine (1998). Soames, Mary (ed.). Speaking for Themselves: The Personal Letters of Winston and Clementine Churchill. London: Doubleday. ISBN 978-0-385-40691-8. OCLC 472576610.
- Coombs, David (1967). Churchill - his paintings. London: Hamish Hamilton. OCLC 3437376.
- —; Churchill, Minnie (2003). Sir Winston Churchill's Life Through his Paintings. London: Chaucer Press. ISBN 978-1-904-44916-4. OCLC 834797327.
- Gilbert, Martin (1976). Prophet of Truth: Winston S. Churchill 1922–1939. Authorised biography of Winston S. Churchill. Vol. V. London: Heinemann. OCLC 715481469.
- — (1986). Road to Victory: Winston S. Churchill 1941–1945. Authorised biography of Winston S. Churchill. Vol. VII. London: Heinemann. ISBN 978-0-434-13017-7. OCLC 658165202.
