= Jerry Hopkins (author) =

American journalist and author

- Born: November 9, 1935; Camden, New Jersey, U.S.
- Died: June 3, 2018 (aged 82); Bangkok, Thailand
- Occupations: Author, journalist
- Website: jerryhopkins.com

Elisha Gerald Hopkins (November 9, 1935 – June 3, 2018) was an American journalist and author best known for writing the first biographies of Elvis Presley and Jim Morrison of the Doors, as well as serving for 20 years as a correspondent and contributing editor of Rolling Stone magazine. He also penned several other biographies, wrote history and humor, and was a writer-producer for Mike Wallace, Steve Allen and Mort Sahl.

Hopkins published 37 books and an estimated one thousand magazine articles. Some of his books have been translated into over a dozen languages.

== Early life ==
Hopkins was born in Camden, New Jersey, and raised in nearby Haddonfield, a town founded by Quakers. His parents operated a dry cleaning store.

== Education ==
He attended a Quaker school through 6th grade and public schools through 12th. He earned a BA in journalism from Washington & Lee University in Lexington, Virginia, in 1957 and, following a short period as a reporter for the Twin City Sentinel in Winston-Salem, North Carolina, and brief service in the US Army, an MS in journalism from Columbia University in New York in 1959.

== Early life ==
After freelancing articles to the then-young Village Voice while at Columbia, he worked as a reporter for the Times-Picayune and as news editor of WWL Radio in New Orleans (1959–1961). He joined Mike Wallace as a writer-producer in New York for one year (1961–62) then moved to Los Angeles where he was a talent coordinator and writer-producer for Steve Allen (1962–1964). He also wrote and produced television programs for Mort Sahl, ABC-TV and Universal Studios (1964–1966; 1971). He wrote his first books during this period, an as-told-to autobiography of a health faddist, Bare Feet and Good Things to Eat (1965) and an astrological spoof, You Were Born on a Rotten Day (1969).

== Career ==
From the mid-1960s, when he left television to open the first head shop in Los Angeles and the third in the nation (1965, Newsweek citation) and then wrote for Rolling Stone as Los Angeles correspondent (1967–1969), he wrote features and columns for alternative newspapers, including the popular "Making It" column for the Los Angeles Free Press. He contributed articles to TeenSet magazine and its successor AUM. He MC'ed the first love-ins in Los Angeles, edited a collection of material from the underground press, The Hippie Papers (1968) and wrote a history of rock and roll, The Rock Story (1970).

Leaving Rolling Stone temporarily in 1969 to write Elvis: A Biography (1971), it was while serving as the magazine's London correspondent (1972) that he began researching his Morrison biography, No One Here Gets Out Alive. It was rejected by more than 30 publishers before publication in 1980, when it topped the New York Times bestseller chart and was credited by many with helping kick-start the Doors' revival as well as inspiring a new publishing genre, the rock biography. A sequel to the Elvis biography, Elvis: The Final Years (1981) followed, along with biographies of Jimi Hendrix, David Bowie, Yoko Ono, and Raquel Welch, the latter of which was authorized but not published.

By now he had moved to Honolulu, where he edited a monthly newsletter about Hawaiian music and dance and published several books taking Hawaiian culture as their subject, including The Hula (1981), a history; How to Make Your Own Hawaiian Musical Instruments (1988); Elvis in Hawaii (2002); and Don Ho: My Life, My Music (2007). He also was an editor at Pacific Business News in Honolulu and a speechwriter for Mayor Frank Fasi.

After moving to Thailand in 1993, he wrote for numerous travel, food, and airline magazines and collaborated with photographer Michael Freeman on Strange Foods: An Epicurean Adventure Around the World (1999), which was expanded and reissued as Extreme Cuisine with a foreword by Anthony Bourdain (2004). A collection of expatriate profiles, Bangkok Babylon (2005); a book of stories and essays, Thailand Confidential (2005); and Asian Aphrodisiacs (2006) followed. His 37th book, profiling Western novelists who helped forge the Asian myth, Romancing the East, was published in 2013.

== Personal life ==
Hopkins was married four times, to Sara Cordell (1959–1963), Jane Hollingsworth (1968–1976), Rebecca Erickson Crockett (1980–1988); he had two children by his second wife, Erin Hendershot (b. 1970) and Nick Hopkins (b. 1972), and eight grandchildren. He and his wife, Lamyai (m. 2003), a citizen of Thailand, divided their time between a flat in Bangkok and a house and farm six hours away in rice country near the Cambodian border.

== Bibliography ==
- Bare Feet & Good Things to Eat (1965) with Gypsy Boots
- The Hippie Papers (1968) Editor
- You Were Born on a Rotten Day (1969) with Jim Critchfield
- The Rock Story (1970)
- Groupies & Other Girls (1970) with John Burks
- Festival: An American Celebration (1970) with Jim Marshall & Baron Wolman (photographers)
- Elvis: A Biography (1971)
- The Last Sex Manual (1978) with Ron Pion, MD
- No One Here Gets Out Alive (1980) with Danny Sugerman
- The Hula (1981)
- Elvis: The Final Years (1981)
- Hit & Run: The Jimi Hendrix Story (1983)
- Bowie (1985)
- Fax to Da Max (1985) with Peppo (illustrator)
- Yoko Ono (1986)
- The L.A. Book of Lists (1987)
- Vinny: Part II, The Habilitat Story (1987) with Vincent Marino
- Fax 2 Da Max (1988)
- How to Make Your Own Hawaiian Musical Instruments (1988) with Martin Charlot (illustrator)
- The Westin Maui (1989) with William Waterfall (photographer)
- Kauai Lagoons (1990) with William Waterfall (photographer)
- 50 Simple Things You Can Do to Save Hawaii (1990) with Susan Manual
- Frank DeLima's Joke Book (1991) with Frank DeLima
- The Lizard King: The Essential Jim Morrison (1992)
- The Jimi Hendrix Experience (1996) Updated reprint
- Strange Foods (1999) with Michael Freeman (photographer)
- Elvis in Hawaii (2002)
- Extreme Cuisine (2004) with Michael Freeman (photographer)
- In the Name of the Boss Upstairs: The Father Ray Brennan Story (2004)
- Thailand Confidential (2005)
- Bangkok Babylon (2005)
- The Pacific Showman (2005) with Tom Moffatt
- Asian Aphrodisiacs (2006)
- Aloha Elvis (2007)
- Don Ho: My Life, My Music (2007) with Don Ho
- Elvis: The Biography (2007)
- Romancing The East (2013)
- Behind Closed Doors (2013)
