= Solange de Ganay =

French ethnologist (1902–2003)

- Born: 1902; Salbris, Loir-et-Cher, France
- Died: 25 August 2003 (aged 100–101); Paris, France
- Occupation: Ethnologist

Marie Madeleine Jacqueline Solange de Ganay (1902 – 25 August 2003) was a French ethnologist focusing on the Dogon people of Mali and West Africa.

Born into an aristocratic family, she gained an interest in African affairs through traveling in the region and meeting the individuals who lived there. In the 1930s, de Ganay took ethnographic classes with Marcel Mauss at École pratique des hautes études, and she was one of the first women to work in the field with Marcel Griaule. During World War II, she worked as an ambulance driver while also finishing her post-secondary studies. 1946 saw her return to field work, organizing annual voyages to Mali until an accident in 1956 limited her travel.

The Dogon people, the Bambara people, and the diverse world of Mali were all areas of scholarship for de Ganay: she wrote several articles and books on their religious and spiritual practices.

She married Charles de Breteuil, a French businessman, and had one child, Michel.

== Selected publications ==
- Les Devises des Dogons (1941)
- Le Binou Yébéné (1942)
- Le génie des eaux chez les Dogons (with G. Dieterlen). P. Geuthner (1942)
- "Toponymie et anthroponymie de l’Afrique Noire" in Revue internationale d'onomastique, 2(2), pp. 143–146 (1948)
- Aspects de mythologie et de symbolique bambara. Documents recueillis au cours de la 6e mission Griaule (1946/47). Presses universitaires de France (1949)
- "Notes sur la théodicée bambara" in Revue de l'histoire des religions, pp. 187–213 (1949)
- "Graphies Bambara des nombres" in Journal des Africanistes, 20(2), pp. 295–305 (1950)
- "Une graphie soudanaise du doigt du Créateur" in Revue de l'histoire des religions, pp. 45–49 (1951)
- Ethnologiques: hommages à Marcel Griaule (with M. Griaule). Hermann (1987)
- Le sanctuaire Kama blon de Kangaba: histoire, mythes, peintures pariétales et cérémonies septennales. Editions Nouvelles du Sud (1995)
