= Michael Freeman (photographer) =

British author, photographer and journalist

Michael Freeman (born 1945) is a British author, photographer and journalist.

In 1978, Athens, the first book giving him title-credit as a photographer, was published in a Time-Life series called The World’s Great Cities. This was followed by two other books, "Guardians of the North-West Frontier: The Pathans" in 1982 and "Wayfarers of the Thai Forest: The Akha" in 1982, both in the subsequent Time-Life series "Peoples of the Wild". Freeman has had a long working relationship with the Smithsonian magazine, and has photographed 40 stories between 1978 and 2008. One of his main specialisations has been Asian culture, architecture and archaeology, and he has photographed and written many books on these, including five on Angkor. The first of these, "Angkor: The Hidden Glories" was used in filming the 1992 non-verbal film Baraka, and Freeman is one of the eight cast in the accompanying 2008 documentary "Baraka: A Closer Look".

He has written more than 40 books on the subject of photography, in particular its practice, and for two of these ("Light" and "Image", both published by Collins, now HarperCollins) he was awarded the Prix Louis Philippe Clerc in 1990 from the Musée Français de la Photographie in Bièvres, France. He has written and illustrated the photography course materials for the Open College of the Arts, an independent British distance learning college. Freeman is also a teacher in online learning with Learning with Experts.

== Select List of Published works ==
=== Photography books ===
- Athens (Time-Life, 1978, ISBN 0-8368-5021-1)
- Guardians of the North-West Frontier: The Pathans (Time-Life, 1982, ISBN 978-0-7054-0702-1)
- Wayfarers of the Thai Forest: The Akha (Time-Life, 1982, ISBN 978-0-7054-0703-8)
- Angkor: The Hidden Glories (Houghton Mifflin Harcourt, 1990, ISBN 978-0-395-53757-2)
- The Photographer's Eye: Composition and Design for Better Digital Photos

UK (ILEX, 2007, ISBN 978-1-905814-04-6) US (Focal Press, 2007, ISBN 978-0-240-80934-2)

- Michael Freeman's Perfect Exposure

UK (ILEX, 2009, ISBN 978-1-905814-46-6) US (Focal Press, 2009, ISBN 978-0-240-81171-0)

- The Photographer's Mind: Creative Thinking for Better Digital Photos

UK (ILEX, 2010, ISBN 978-1-905814-97-8) US (Focal Press, 2010, ISBN 978-0-240-81517-6)

- The Photographer's Vision: Understanding and Appreciating Great Photography (Focal Press, 2011, ISBN 978-0-240-81518-3)

=== Books on Asia ===
- Ricelands: The World of South-east Asian Food (Reaktion Books, 2008, ISBN 978-1-86189-378-9)
- The Spirit of Asia: Journeys to the Sacred Places of the East (Thames & Hudson, 2000, ISBN 978-0-500-51023-0)
- "New Zen, The tea-ceremony room in modern Japanese architecture" (Eight Books, 2007, ISBN 978-0-9554322-0-0)
- and many others

=== Books on Africa ===
- Sudan: The Land and the People (Thames & Hudson, 2005, ISBN 978-0-500-51257-9). This book was accompanied by a 70-print exhibition mounted by Meridian International Center, Washington DC, a non-profit public diplomacy institution, which organised the exhibit to tour the US for three years.

=== Books on Interiors ===
- "The Source - Inspirational ideas for the home" (Eight Books, 2009, ISBN 978-0-9554322-4-8)
