= Samuel Morgenstern =

Austrian businessman and a business partner of young Adolf Hitler

- Born: 1875; Budapest, Austria-Hungary
- Died: August 1943 (aged 67–68); Łódź Ghetto, Nazi-occupied Poland
- Occupation: Businessman
- Known for: Business partner of Adolf Hitler during the latter's Vienna years
- Spouse: Emma Morgenstern
- Military career
- Allegiance: Austria-Hungary
- Branch: Austro-Hungarian Army
- Rank: Officer
- Conflicts: First World War (Romanian front)
- Awards: Two military diplomas

Samuel Morgenstern (1875 – August 1943) was an Austrian businessman and a business partner of the young Adolf Hitler in his time in Vienna (1908–1913). Morgenstern, who was Jewish, gained some importance in Hitler research, since the good relationship he held with Hitler was sometimes taken as evidence that he was not yet an anti-Semite at that point.

== Life and work ==
=== Early years (1875 to 1911) ===
Morgenstern was born in 1875 as the son of Hungarian Jews in Budapest. In his youth he learned the craft of glassmaking, and served in the Austro-Hungarian Army for several years. Later Mogenstern moved to Vienna, where he opened in 1903 a glass shop with associated workshop. The store in the backyard of the house Liechensteinstraße No. 4 was conveniently located near the center of Vienna, which probably contributed to the rapid success of the company.

In 1904, he married Emma Pragan (born 1871), the daughter of a Jewish family from Vienna. They had a son born in 1911. Over his professional career, Morgenstern achieved modest prosperity, buying a country estate in Strebersdorf near Vienna for the price of 5,000 crowns. In May 1914, he bought another piece of land at Großjedlersdorf for 50,000 crowns.

=== Relationship with Adolf Hitler (1911/1912 to 1913) ===
In 1937, Morgenstern stated at the request of the main archive of the Nazi Party in Munich that Adolf Hitler first appeared in his Viennese shop in 1911 or 1912. Hitler's offer to include some of his pictures, especially watercolors, in Morgenstern's assortment was taken up by Glaser, who also sold picture frames. As a result, Hitler regularly supplied Morgenstern's business with his pictures until his emigration to Germany in May 1913. Morgenstern later said he bought them to fill empty frames that were for sale, attracting the customer's eye.

The motifs of Hitler's paintings were mostly historical views in the style of Rudolf von Alt. Morgenstern also knew the Viennese lawyer Dr. Joseph Feingold. Feingold's wife, Elsa, née Schäfer, liked the pictures, and he bought several for his apartment and law firm. After the invasion of the German Army, the pictures were picked up by the Gestapo. The Feingolds were arrested while fleeing to the Nice area, deported to Auschwitz via Drancy internment camp, and murdered.

=== Later life (1913–1943) ===
Morgenstern participated in the First World War as an officer of the Austro-Hungary's army on the Romanian front. After the war, he was honored with two military diplomas for exemplary behavior, and returned to his old profession.

After the annexation of Austria in March 1938, Morgenstern soon became the target of the anti-Semitic policy of the National Socialists. After the Kristallnacht, his business was closed by the authorities. On 24 November 1938, it was "aryanized", i.e. Morgenstern was forced to sell it to an Aryan. However, the purchase price of 620 Reichsmark for his workshop, shop and an extensive warehouse was never paid. Morgenstern was also deprived of his license to practice his trade; he was banned from working. In the following months, he depended on public generosity.

Morgenstern wrote a letter to his former associate, Hitler, on 10 August 1939 addressed to "His Excellency the Chancellor and leader of the German Reich". It was apparently intercepted by bureaucrats as it has markings, such as underlines and "Jew!" added to the margin. In his letter, Morgenstern asked that the authorities, in exchange for the transfer of his landed property, pay compensation for the confiscation of his property in foreign currency, so that he could emigrate. The letter went unanswered. Morgenstern could not leave the Nazi sphere of power because he could not afford travel expenses, and the Reich Flight Tax.

Shortly after the outbreak of World War II, the Morgensterns were expropriated and deported as Jews to occupied Poland, where they were imprisoned in the Łódź Ghetto. There Samuel Morgenstern died of wasting in August 1943. He was buried in the ghetto cemetery. His wife, Emma, who, as her brother-in-law Wilhelm Abeles (who also lived in the ghetto and survived Auschwitz) witnessed her husband's death, was most likely deported to the Auschwitz-Birkenau concentration camp at the same month. Since it was a standard practice in Auschwitz to send most newcomers, especially old women unable to work, directly to the gas chambers, their death can be considered certain. In December 1946, a Viennese court ruled that they could not have survived to the end of the war and pronounced them dead, in agreement with a motion filed by her brother Max Pragan.

== Hitler's antisemitism ==
Some scholars argue that Hitler was not a pronounced anti-Semite during his time in Vienna, despite his enthusiastic Pan-German League attitude. As evidence for this, they state that young Hitler did business with Morgenstern, and maintained a friendly relationship with him and his wife. For a while, he visited the two once a week as a guest in their home. This idea is supported by Hitler's good relationship with other Viennese Jews such as Jakob Altenberg or his cohabitants at the men's dormitory, Josef Neumann and Siegfried Löffner, whom Hitler trusted more in business affairs than, for example, his petty criminal friend Reinhold Hanisch, a fervent anti-Semite.

This behavior is in direct contradiction to Hitler's own claim in Mein Kampf, where he claims to have already been convinced in Vienna of the perishability of Judaism. However, researchers including Brigitte Hamann see Hitler's assertion in the light of his good relationship with Jews such as Morgenstern as a political statement, purported to give the impression that his anti-Semitism developed in a straightforward line, and conceal changes in his thinking.

That Morgenstern could have contributed in any way to provoke or nourish Hitler's prejudices or a bad image of "the Jew" can be considered as ruled out. Not only was Morgenstern the most important source of income for the young Hitler in the years around 1912, he also offered, as Peter Jahn of the main archive of the NSDAP still noted in 1937, good prices for Hitler's pictures. In addition, Hitler gave Jahn an appreciative statement in the 1930s that Morgenstern had been his "savior" during the Vienna period, and had given him many important commissions.
