= Wonderland Avenue: Tales of Glamour and Excess =

1989 memoir of Danny Sugerman

- Author: Danny Sugerman
- Language: English
- Genre: Memoir
- Publication date: 1989

Wonderland Avenue: Tales of Glamour and Excess, first published in 1989, is the personal memoir of late author and The Doors' publicist Danny Sugerman, who went on to manage Ray Manzarek's solo-career.

== Synopsis ==
In the book, Sugerman recounts his life, beginning with his childhood in Beverly Hills that was pleasant until his father filed for divorce from his mother. Sugerman asserts that this event, as well as the resulting difficult relationships he had with his father and stepfather, set the stage for his later self-destructive addictions and behavior. The stepfather detested the sight of a man or adolescent boy with long hair.

According to Wonderland Avenue, after the premature death of Danny Sugerman's adolescent friend and "teacher", Jim Morrison, he became friends with and then went on to manage rock singer Iggy Pop before the singer ended up in a California state mental hospital suffering with severely excessive drug and alcohol addiction, and Sugerman ended up in a private hospital.

Wonderland Avenue covers the first eight years of Sugerman's show business career, commencing with his first job at age 12 answering the Doors' fan mail, and concluding just beyond his 21st birthday, when he is a frail and severely drug-addicted mental patient who has been given less than a week to live. His exposure to the decadent music industry world of parties, groupies, and drugs at such a young age would facilitate a relentless heroin addiction [among other addictions] that nearly killed him. Notable in the book is Sugerman's close personal friendship throughout his adolescence with late Doors frontman Jim Morrison, who served as a kind of mentor to Sugerman, and his post-Doors activities in L.A, an attempt to manage the flagging career (and supervise the behavior of) an increasingly unstable Iggy Pop. This section of the book is titled "the blind following the blind."

The book chronicles, in graphic detail, the decadence of the LA rock and roll lifestyle, lived to its most degrading and shocking extremes, in the early to mid-1970s. In the book's conclusion, Sugerman says he is clean and sober, and he sometimes wonders what Jim Morrison would say to him if he could comment on his new way of life. Sugerman adds that although we have no way of knowing, he believes Morrison would say, "Feel the pain. Don't try to escape from it." In 1988, as Sugerman writes this conclusion to his book, he notes that many people about whom he has written are dead. He adds that Iggy Pop has learned to maintain a gap between his real self and the character that his fans have seen onstage, and that the real man and the character "have reconciled their differences and are functioning as a happy team."

== Potential film adaptation ==
In June 1990, the Los Angeles Times reported that Wonderland Avenue was being developed into a film for Carolco Pictures titled "Wild Child", with a script written by Desmond Nakano, and Oliver Stone set as Executive Producer. The project never materialized.

== Bibliography ==
- Danny Sugerman (1995). Wonderland Avenue: Tales of Glamour and Excess. Little, Brown and Company. ISBN 0316773549.
