= Rod Underhill (author) =

American attorney and author (1953–2018)

Rod Underhill (October 7, 1953 – September 7, 2018) was an American attorney and author who wrote books about the Internet and MP3 technology and was also a founder of MP3.com. His books include The Complete Idiot's Guide to MP3 and The Complete Idiot's Guide to Making Millions on the Internet, each written with Nat Gertler.

== Biography ==
Underhill was born on October 7, 1953, and practiced law in California from 1980 until 1998, when he cofounded MP3.com.

After leaving MP3.com, Underhill served as a law professor at Thomas Jefferson School of Law and in 2008 was awarded a Webby Award (People's Voice Award) for his work as cofounder of Podlinez.com.

Underhill lived in Julian, California, with his wife and two children. He died from heart failure during a cancer treatment.

== Selected books ==
- The Complete Idiot's Guide to MP3 (with Nat Gertler), Que Books, 2000 (ISBN 0789720361).
- The Complete Idiot's Guide to Making Millions on the Internet (with Nat Gertler), Que Books, 2001 (ISBN 978-0-7897-2298-0).
- MP3: Musica En Internet Facil (Spanish language version of Guide to MP3,) Que Books, 2001 (ISBN 9789684444621) .
- MP3 (French language variation of Guide to MP3), Campuspress (Paris, France), 2000 (ISBN 2744008257).
- MP3 : muzyka w Internecie nie tylko dla orłów (Polish language edition of Guide to MP3) Intersoftland, (Warsaw, Poland), 2000 (ISBN 8372600074)
