= Kenneth Pendar =

American diplomat (1906–1972)

Kenneth W. Pendar (December 22, 1906 – December 5, 1972) was a United States diplomat who served as Vice-Consul in Marrakesh and Casablanca in 1942 and 1943. He published his memoirs, where he recounts his wartime experiences and activities, in two books, Adventure in Diplomacy: Our French Dilemma and Adventure in Diplomacy (World War II). He graduated from Harvard College in 1930.

Kenneth Pendar's involvement in supporting the nationalist movement in Morocco, his close ties to the Istiqlal party, and his business ventures, particularly with Coca-Cola, raised suspicions about possible connections to the CIA. His story highlights the blurred lines between civilian life and intelligence work, showcasing how former intelligence officers like Pendar engaged in economic activities while maintaining informal contacts with their former colleagues.

Pendar served as a second to American diplomat Robert Murphy in Algiers during Operation Torch in November 1942. He was instrumental in helping to arrange a ceasefire between French and invading Allied forces, which produced the controversial "Darlan deal." Murphy and American commander, General Mark Clark, accepted the continuing authority of Admiral François Darlan, the commander of all Vichy French military forces at the time. The acceptance of the continued authority of the Vichy regime under Marshal Philippe Pétain in North Africa was very controversial at the time and badly received by the public in Allied countries, especially Britain. Free-French leader Charles de Gaulle, who was excluded from any role in Operation Torch, was especially upset by the "deal." Pendar acted as a liaison with the pro-Allied (but not Gaullist) underground in Algiers before and during the Allied invasion. He was unable to keep most of them out of jail after the agreement to a ceasefire.
