= David Coombs =

British author, historian, and teacher

David John Coombs (born February 1937) is a British author, historian, and teacher. He is a former editor of the Antique Collector and was a columnist for the British weekly trade magazine, Antiques Gazette.

Coombs is best known for his research on Winston Churchill's art work, publishing two books on the subject (1967 and 2003). He has been described as "the official authority on Churchill's art." He produced and later revivised a catalogue which brings together all of Churchill's 500 or so paintings and 2 sculptures, in which each piece has been given a number prefixed with the letter C for Coombs. This catalogue also exist in the form of a digital archive of the paintings. His 1967 catalogue was described as "an indispensable catalogue" of Churchill's art.

David Coombs's 2016 biography from Artnewsletter.com reads as follows:

Dignified as an art historian, David Coombs is a writer, a visual arts journalist, amateur historian and pipe-smoker. In 1958 he used his boyhood interests to make his living in London, first at the antiquarian booksellers Henry Sotheran and then at the Parker Gallery, antique dealers, print and picture sellers specialising in marine art. Following this practical apprenticeship, David Coombs joined The Connoisseur magazine as an art journalist in 1962, then moving to become the Editor of its smaller sister The Antique Collector magazine from 1974 – 1994, when he retired.

Frustrated by the lack of opportunity to share his enthusiasms, and seeing the possibilities of internet publication with the advent of the Apple Mac G3 in 1999, David Coombs launched in the summer of the same year his own online publication: ArtNewsLetter.com. This continues to evolve in its distinctly individual and idiosyncratic way.

Between times:

Following Sir Winston Churchill's death in 1965, David Coombs saw the need for an illustrated catalogue of his paintings: to protect his reputation in this regard for the future. This was published in 1967 as Churchill his paintings, and in 2003 was followed, with the essential and unstinting help of Minnie Churchill, by a fully revised and much expanded edition Sir Winston Churchill's Life Through His Paintings. It incorporated a detailed bibliographical analysis by David Coombs of Churchill's famous little book Painting as a Pastime, which included the startling discovery that the text was greatly influenced by John Ruskin. This second book was the direct consequence of a large exhibition of Churchill's paintings held at Sotheby's in London in 1998, which David Coombs curated. This work continues to advance in consequence of the present-day growth of interest in Churchill's paintings internationally.

In 1974 David Coombs was closely involved with an Arts Council exhibition of British Sporting Art held at the Hayward Gallery in London where he was the curator of its prints and drawings section. In its turn this led to his second book published in 1978: England and the Countryside through paintings, watercolours and prints. One interesting discovery was the close connection between Gainsborough's painting Coursing a Fox in the Iveagh Bequest, Kenwood House, and a similar, though more bloody composition by Frans Snyders in the Methuen Collection at Corsham Court.

From 1962 until his retirement, David Coombs edited a number of books on local history as well as antiques of various kinds, notably a series of four: The Connoisseur Illustrated Guides, which he devised.

After 1994, David Coombs became a travelling judge for the annual Museum of the Year Awards, was appointed a member of the Archives and Collections Committee [?] of the Royal Society of Arts of which he is a Life Fellow, and wrote a series of interviews for the Antiques Trade Gazette.

Then, in pursuit of his long-term interest in the Royal collector and patron Frederick Prince of Wales, David Coombs spent 18 months studying his manuscript accounts in the offices of the Duchy of Cornwall. Here he chanced upon the original planting lists of the Prince's garden at Carlton House in London, designed for the Prince by William Kent from 1732; these included previously unknown references to, for example, the inclusion of sculptures there by Peter Scheemakers and Michael Rysbrack. This work also showed that one of the three portraits of the Prince and his sisters The Music Party by Philippe Mercier (in the Royal Collection) was set within Carlton House. The comprehensive and fully illustrated results allowed a reasonable “reconstruction” of William Kent's innovative urban garden. Published in Garden History 1997.

After many years thought and experiment, David Coombs compiled a selection of prayers, psalms and readings, principally but not exclusively Biblical, all with the aim of bringing a degree of Hope to those who have been bereaved – a group of people strangely neglected hitherto. This was published in 2011 as A Little Book of Consolation.

Currently, David Coombs is at work in West Sussex Records Office trawling the more than 4,000 papers of Walter Hussey, Dean of Chichester Cathedral from 1955 - 77. A “biographical study” is in prospect of this wholly remarkable and unassuming priest and man. His collection of modern British art forms the inspiration and foundation for the Pallant House Gallery in Chichester; in addition and not least, Walter Hussey was a significant patron of artists and musicians including Henry Moore, Graham Sutherland, John Piper, Marc Chagall, Benjamin Britten, Gerald Finzi, William Walton and Leonard Bernstein.

David Coombs was for many years a member of the Council of Management at Parham Park in West Sussex and latterly also a trustee of Sir John Soanes's Museum in London. Retiring from both, he has now retired also from his local Museum in Godalming, Surrey of which, on account of his long-term interest in local history and the environment, he was a founding trustee with specific responsibility for its library and collections.

== Bibliography ==
- Churchill: His Paintings, by David Coombs (1967)
- Sport and the Countryside in English Paintings, Watercolours and Prints, by David Coombs (1978)
- Sir Winston Churchill's Life Through His Paintings, by David Coombs with Minnie Churchill (2003)
- Sir Winston Churchill: His Life and His Paintings, by Minnie Churchill and David Coombs (2013)
