= Alabama (disambiguation) =

Alabama is a state in the Southern United States.

Alabama may also refer to:

== Places ==
=== United States ===
- Alabama, New York, a town
- Alabama, Texas
- Alabama River, Alabama
- Alabama Territory, a US territory from 1817 to 1819
- Alabama Township, a former civil township in Sacramento County, California
- Alabama Hill (disambiguation)
- Alabama Hills
- Alabama Hollow

=== Greenland ===
- Alabama Nunatak

== Music ==
- Alabama (band), a band formed in 1969
- Alabama (Canadian band), an early 1970s Canadian band
- Alabama 3, an English band, known as A3 in North America
- "Alabama" (state song), the official state song of Alabama
- "Alabama" (John Coltrane song)
- "Alabama", a song on the 1971 album Present Company by Janis Ian
- "Alabama", a song from the 1956 album Tragic Songs of Life by The Louvin Brothers
- "Alabama", a song on the 1972 album Harvest by Neil Young
- "Alabama", a song on the 2008 album Division by 10 Years

== People ==
- Alabama Creole people
- Alabama people, Native Americans of the Southeastern culture
- Alabama Barker (Alabama Luella Barker, born 2005), American musician, known for her role as a child actor in Meet the Barkers
- Alabama Chanin, American fashion designer
- Alabama Pitts (1909–1941), American baseball player and convicted robber nicknamed "Alabama"
- Alabama Slim, American blues singer and guitarist

== Ships ==
- USS Alabama, numerous United States Navy ships
- CSS Alabama, a screw sloop-of-war built in 1862 for the Confederate States Navy
- MV Maersk Alabama, former name of MV Maersk Andaman, hijacked by pirates in 2009
- Alabama (schooner), built in 1926

== Other uses ==
- University of Alabama, Tuscaloosa, Alabama, United States, a public university
  - Alabama Crimson Tide, the varsity teams that represent the University of Alabama
- Alabama Ballet
- Alabama-Halle ("Alabama Hall"), former concert and theatre venue in Munich, Germany
- Alabama (moth), a genus of moth in the family Erebidae
- Alabama language, spoken by the Alabama-Coushatta tribe of Texas
- Alabama (computer virus)
- Alabama Stakes, thoroughbred stakes race run at the Saratoga Race Course

== See also ==
- Alabama Port, Alabama, an unincorporated community
- University of Alabama (disambiguation)
- Alabam (disambiguation)
