= Nathaniel Wilson =

Nathaniel Wilson may refer to:

- Ranji Wilson (1886–1953), rugby football player for New Zealand
- Nathaniel S. Wilson (born 1947), American sailmaker, rigger, and sail designer
- Kool G Rap (born 1968), American rapper

== See also ==
- Nathan Wilson (disambiguation)
- Nathanael Wilson (died 1695), English Anglican priest
