= Urbanpod =

Urbanpod is a capsule hotel based in the Andheri suburb of Mumbai. It is India's first pod hotel, though it incorporates equipment shipped from China, and offers a total of 140 rooms Users can book their pods through online platforms and offline travel agencies. Urbanpod rooms come with facilities that are found in traditional hotels. Urbanpod is currently investigating expansion towards other Indian cities.
