= James Gang (disambiguation) =

James Gang is a 1970s rock band.

James Gang may also refer to:

- The James Gang (film), a 1997 film directed by Mike Barker
- James–Younger Gang, a 19th-century criminal gang centered on Frank and Jesse James
- New Age Outlaws (formerly known as James Gang), the name of wrestling tag team of Billy Gunn and Road Dogg
- A nickname for LeBron James's supporting cast with the Cleveland Cavaliers
