= Alabama Song =

1927 English-language song by Elisabeth Hauptmann, Franz Servatius Bruinier, Kurt Weill

- song by F. S. Bruinier, Kurt Weill
- Text: Elisabeth Hauptmann
- Language: English
- Composed: 1927

The "Alabama Song"—also known as "Moon of Alabama", "Moon over Alabama", and "Whisky Bar"—is an English language song written by Elisabeth Hauptmann in 1925 and set to music by Franz Servatius Bruinier and Kurt Weill for Bertolt Brecht's 1927 Mahagonny-Songspiel. Brecht also used it for his 1930 opera Rise and Fall of the City of Mahagonny. It has been recorded by the Doors and David Bowie.

== Original version ==
"Alabama-Song"

Single by Lotte Lenya
- B-side: Denn wie man sich bettet
- Recorded: 24 February 1930
- Genre: Cabaret; opera
- Label: Homocord

The "Alabama Song" was written in English on Bertolt Brecht's behalf by his close collaborator Elisabeth Hauptmann before 1925 and published in Brecht's 1927 Hauspostille (Home Postil), a parody of a collection of sermons by Martin Luther. It was set to music by Bruinier, and Weill adapted it for the 1927 Mahagonny-Songspiel and reused it for Brecht and Weill's 1930 opera Rise and Fall of the City of Mahagonny (Aufstieg und Fall der Stadt Mahagonny), where it is sung by Jenny and her fellow prostitutes in act 1. Although the majority of all three works is in German, the "Alabama Song" retained Hauptmann's English lyrics throughout.

Brecht and Weill's version of the song was first performed by the Viennese actress and dancer Lotte Lenya, Weill's wife, in the role of Jessie at the 1927 Baden-Baden Festival's performance of Mahagonny-Songspiel. The first recording of the song—by Lenya for the Homocord record label—came out in early 1930 under the title "Alabama-Song"; it was rerecorded the same year for the Ultraphon record label for release with the 1930 Leipzig premiere of The Rise and Fall of the City of Mahagonny, despite Lenya not being a member of that cast. She continued to perform and record the song throughout her life, including for her 1955 album Lotte Lenya Sings Kurt Weill (Lotte Lenya singt Kurt Weill), released in the United States under the title Berlin Theater Songs.

== The Doors version ==
"Alabama Song (Whisky Bar)"

Song by the Doors

from the album The Doors
- Released: January 4, 1967
- Recorded: September 20, 1966
- Genre: Avant-garde; dark cabaret; psychedelia
- Length: 3:20
- Label: Elektra
- Songwriters: Bertolt Brecht, Kurt Weill
- Producer: Paul A. Rothchild

The song was recorded in 1966 by the rock group the Doors, listed as "Alabama Song (Whisky Bar)". According to drummer John Densmore and guitarist Robby Krieger, the song was presented by keyboardist Ray Manzarek to the group during their early years, and they decided to rearrange it. The Doors' cover version combines avant-garde and carnival music influences with psychedelic elements. It was a regular one from their set at the Whisky a Go Go, and Van Morrison reported that he was surprised when he heard the Doors playing it at the venue.

The track was recorded during an afternoon recording session on September 20, 1966 at Sunset Sound Recorders.

Lead singer Jim Morrison altered the second verse from "Show us the way to the next pretty boy" to "Show me the way to the next little girl". For the Doors' recording, Ray Manzarek also contributed marxophone along with organ and keyboard bass. Manzarek recalled that it was producer Paul Rothchild's idea to provide a marxophone on the track, and Manzarek felt that "It worked out perfectly, that jingle-jangly sound."

=== Personnel ===
Per sources:

- Jim Morrison – lead and backing vocals
- Robby Krieger – guitar, backing vocals
- Ray Manzarek – Vox Continental, keyboard bass, marxophone, backing vocals
- John Densmore – drums, backing vocals
- Paul A. Rothchild – backing vocals (Note: Bruce Botnick stated on the documentary Classic Albums: The Doors, while hearing the song's final verse: "It's possible that Paul Rothchild was singing in there too.")

== David Bowie version ==
"Alabama Song"
- German RCA Victor single

Single by David Bowie
- B-side: "Space Oddity (1979 version)"
- Released: 15 February 1980
- Recorded: 2 July 1978
- Studio: Good Earth, London
- Genre: Cabaret; opera
- Length: 3:51
- Label: RCA Victor
- Songwriters: Bertolt Brecht; Kurt Weill
- Producers: David Bowie; Tony Visconti

David Bowie singles chronology
"John, I'm Only Dancing (Again)" (1979)	"Alabama Song" (1980)	"Crystal Japan" (1980)

David Bowie, a Brecht fan, performed the song throughout his 1978 Isolar II tour. A live version from the tour, recorded in either Philadelphia on 29 April 1978 or in Boston on 6 May, appeared on the 1991, 2005 and 2017 reissues of the live album Stage. On 2 July 1978, a day after the tour's European leg ended, Bowie recorded a studio version at Tony Visconti's Good Earth Studios in London with his studio band. Pianist Sean Mayes stated that "it had been such a hit on the tour that David wanted to do it as a single." With unconventional key changes, the track "seemed calculated to disrupt any radio programme on which it was lucky enough to get played", in the words of NME editors Roy Carr and Charles Shaar Murray.

Bowie's studio cut of "Alabama Song" was released in the UK by RCA Records as a single on 15 February 1980, with the catalogue number RCA BOW 5; RCA did not release the single in the US. Reaching number 23 in the UK, the single featured a fold-out sleeve and was backed by Bowie's new acoustic rendition of "Space Oddity", recorded in December 1979 for The "Will Kenny Everett Make It to 1980?" Show. Discussing the track, biographer Nicholas Pegg calls it "one of the most defiantly uncommercial, discordant and aggressive recordings Bowie ever released". In 2016, Ultimate Classic Rock placed the single at number 84 (out of 119) in a list ranking every Bowie single from worst to best.

Bowie later appeared in a BBC version of Brecht's Baal and released an EP of songs from the play. He subsequently performed "Alabama Song" on his 1990 Sound+Vision and 2002 Heathen tours. The song also appeared on the 1992 Rykodisc reissue of Scary Monsters (and Super Creeps), as well as the compilation albums Rare (1982), The Singles Collection (1993), The Best of David Bowie 1980/1987 (2007) and Re:Call 3, part of the A New Career in a New Town (1977–1982) box set, in 2017.

=== Personnel ===
According to Chris O'Leary:

- David Bowie – lead and backing vocal
- Adrian Belew – lead guitar, backing vocal
- Carlos Alomar – rhythm guitar, backing vocal
- Simon House – electric violin
- Sean Mayes – piano, backing vocal
- Roger Powell – synthesiser
- George Murray – bass, backing vocal
- Dennis Davis – drums
- Tony Visconti – backing vocal

Technical

- David Bowie – producer
- Tony Visconti – producer

== References in popular culture ==
- The Watergate Hotel lobby whisky bar is named after this song.
- The political commentator Billmon named his blog Whiskey Bar quoting the song. When he closed the comments, his followers created another blog named Moon of Alabama.
- The Doors' version of this song was featured in the 2013 Edgar Wright film The World's End, during a montage where the main characters are trying to continue their pub crawl without arousing the suspicions of the androids who have invaded their hometown.
- A heavily distorted sample of The Doors' version is also used as a track in the horror game Sad Satan.

== Selective list of recorded versions ==
- Jazz musicians Eric Dolphy and John Lewis recorded Mack the Knife and Other Berlin Theatre Songs of Kurt Weill, an album of Kurt Weill tunes in 1964. "Alabama Song" was performed by a band consisting of Dolphy on bass clarinet, Lewis on piano, Nick Travis on trumpet, Mike Zwerin on trombone, Richard Davis on double bass, and Connie Kay on drums. The solo order is trombone, piano, and bass clarinet. Zwerin asked Dolphy to "play what [he] felt about Alabama".
- Dave Van Ronk recorded an acoustic solo version of "Alabama Song" on his 1966 LP No Dirty Names.
- Bette Midler. The song was included in a medley in her 1977 live show and double album Live at Last.
- Nina Simone, on her 1987 album Live At Ronnie Scott's, recorded at Ronnie Scott's Jazz Club in London in 1984.
- It was covered by Ralph Schuckett with Richard Butler, Bob Dorough, Ellen Shipley and John Petersen on the tribute album Lost in the Stars: The Music of Kurt Weill.
- Ute Lemper in 1991: Ute Lemper Sings Kurt Weill
- The Young Gods covered it on their 1991 release The Young Gods Play Kurt Weill, with the lyrics "Show us the way to the next little girl".
- Marianne Faithfull performed this song (along with several other Brecht/Weill songs) live on her 20th Century Blues album released in 1996.
- David Johansen covered the song on a compilation of Kurt Weill's music entitled September Songs – The Music of Kurt Weill, released in 1997.

== See also ==
- Other "Alabama" songs
- Other "Whisky Bar"s

== Notes and references ==
=== Sources ===
- Carr, Roy; Murray, Charles Shaar (1981). Bowie: An Illustrated Record. London: Eel Pie Publishing. ISBN 978-0-380-77966-6.
- O'Leary, Chris (2019). Ashes to Ashes: The Songs of David Bowie 1976–2016. London: Repeater. ISBN 978-1-912248-30-8.
- Pegg, Nicholas (2016). The Complete David Bowie (revised and updated ed.). London: Titan Books. ISBN 978-1-78565-365-0.
