= Nathaniel S. Wilson =

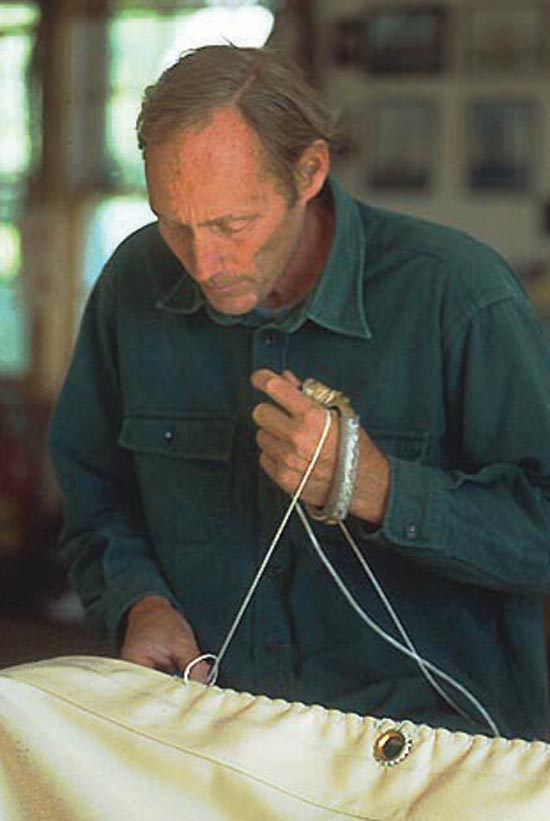
Nat Wilson in 2010

Nathaniel S. Wilson (born 1947) is a Master sailmaker, rigger, and sail designer based in East Boothbay, Maine. He is most well known for building sails for large traditional sailing vessels in the United States and abroad. He has been an innovator in the sailing industry, helping to develop the modern ship sail cloth Oceanus with North Cloth. Wilson is a local legend in Maine and is known worldwide for his expansive knowledge of sailmaking and rigging, both for traditional and modern vessels.

Ships that have or have had sails and/or rigging built by Wilson include the U.S.S. Constitution, USCGC Eagle, Charles W. Morgan, Pride of Baltimore II, Sultana, Clearwater, Spirit of Massachusetts, American Eagle, Lettie G. Howard, Mayflower II, Shenandoah, Alabama, Godspeed and Niagara, amongst thousands of other vessels of various sizes and shapes.
