= Richard G. Mitchell =

English composer (born 1956)

Richard G Mitchell is an English composer of music primarily for movies and television.

Mitchell was born in Manchester, England and brought up in Preston, Lancashire. He attended Hutton Grammar School and later St Martins School of Art in the late 1970s where he graduated with a BA (Hons) in Fine Art. Was awarded an Ivor Novello Award and is best known for scoring the movies: To Kill a King, Grand Theft Parsons, A Good Woman and the 1996 BBC period TV series The Tenant of Wildfell Hall.

== Original Scores ==
Mitchell is an English composer best known for his writing and arranging period movie scores for choir and orchestra, though his compositions span a very wide range of styles varying from classical to more contemporary electronic genres such as drum and bass and trip hop. He also has a reputation for working in a diverse range of world music styles, such as the Tibetan score for Nick Gray's Escape from Tibet in contrast to a country and western pedal steel guitar-based score for Grand Theft Parsons, successful with film music critics at the 2004 Sundance Festival.

His original score for To Kill a King in 2004 continued his successful relationship with director Mike Barker, for whom he scored A Good Woman in 2005, and later the Sea Wolf in 2008, followed by Moby Dick.

His score for the film Trial by Fire won an Ivor Novello Award in 2000 and the BBC period drama The Tenant of Wildfell Hall won Best Score at the Royal Television Society Awards in 1998.

In 2005, Mitchell composed the music for The Call of the Toad, written by Günter Grass and directed by Robert Gliński. The score was recorded with the Polish Symphony Orchestra, and nominated for a Polish Academy Award.

== Other commissions ==
Aside from composing original scores for Film, Mitchell has scored music for Theatre Productions and Live Events which include the Opening Ceremony for Euro '96 at Wembley Stadium. He was commissioned to write the score for one-man theatre show Ousama with Nadim Sawalha directed by Corin Redgrave at the Brixton Shaw Theatre, and a jazz suite for the Francis Bacon Retrospective Exhibition at the Tate Britain in 2008.

== Credits ==
=== Filmography ===
2024

- Oddity

2020

- Caveat

2011

- Moby Dick

2006

- Almost Heaven

2005

- The Call of the Toad
- A Good Woman

2004

- Tempesta

2003

- Grand Theft Parsons

2002

- To Kill a King

2000

- Children of the Holocaust

1998

- La Coupe de la Gloire (Official World Cup Movie)

1997

- Basil

1992

- The Bridge

1986

- Born American

1983

- Rush Hour

1980

- Beastly Treatment

=== Original Soundtrack Albums ===
2012

- Moby Dick

2009

- Sea Wolf

2006

- A Good Woman

2003

- To Kill a King
- Grand Theft Parsons

2001

- The Glass

1998

- Invasion: Earth

1996

- The Tenant of Wildfell Hall

1992

- The Bridge

=== Television Work ===
2009

- Sea Wolf

2006

- Perfect Day: The Millennium

2005

- How to Have a Good Death
- Class of '76
- The Stepfather

2002

- Helen West

2001

- The Glass
- True Originals ("Latika Rana")

2000

- Brits Abroad
- Where There's Smoke

1999

- Trial by Fire
- Trauma Team
- QED

1998

- Get Real
- Invasion: Earth

1997

- Coast to Coast
- Escape From Tibet
- Bridget Jones Diary
- Beyond Belief: Fact or Fiction

1996

- The Tenant of Wildfell Hall (3 episodes)
- Euro 96 Opening Ceremony

1995

- Harry
- SuperMax (First Tuesday)
- Stolen Brides (Network First)
- Scotland Yard

1994

- Brat Pack

1990

- Cluedo
- MasterChef

1989

- War and Peace in the Nuclear Age

1988

- Across the Lake
- Seoul Olympic Theme

1987

- Worlds Beyond
- Truckers

1986

- In The Footsteps Of Scott

== Awards ==
- Won Ivor Novello Award for "Trial By Fire" (2000)
- Nominated Polish Academy Award for "The Call of the Toad" (2005)
- Nominated Royal Television Society Award for "The Glass" (2001)
- Won Royal Television Society Award for "The Tenant of Wildfell Hall
- Won The New York Film and TV Festival best original score for "Rush Hour" (1985)
