= Sea Wolf (miniseries) =

- Release poster
- Based on: The Sea-Wolf by Jack London
- Screenplay by: Nigel Williams
- Directed by: Michael Barker
- Starring: Sebastian Koch; Tim Roth; Neve Campbell; Stephen Campbell Moore
- Composer: Richard G. Mitchell
- Country of origin: Germany; Canada
- Original language: English
- No. of episodes: 2

Production
- Producers: Herbert G. Kloiber; Rikolt von Gagern; Verena von Heeremann
- Cinematography: Richard Greatrex
- Editor: Dean Soltys
- Running time: 180 minutes
- Budget: $19,000,000

Original release
- Release: 2009 – 2009

Sea Wolf is a 2-part television miniseries that aired in 2009, based on the 1904 novel The Sea-Wolf, written by Jack London.

== Plot ==
In a mishap, a young poetry critic Humphrey van Weyden is cast adrift in the open sea. He is picked up by a seal hunting schooner, but his miraculous escape turns into a brutal struggle for survival. The schooner is captained by 'Wolf' Larsen - an authoritarian and harsh captain.

== Production ==
The series was mostly shot in Halifax, Nova Scotia using the Halifax waterfront doubling as San Francisco with shipboard scenes filmed aboard the schooners Alabama, Silva and the museum ship CSS Acadia at the Maritime Museum of the Atlantic.

== Cast ==
- Sebastian Koch as Wolf Larsen
- Tim Roth as Death Larsen
- Neve Campbell as Maud Brewster
- Stephen Campbell Moore as Humphrey Van Weyden
- Andrew Jackson as Johnson
- Tobias Schenke as Leach
