= Moby Dick (2011 miniseries) =

2011 miniseries directed by Mike Barker

- Genre: adventure drama
- Based on: Moby-Dick by Herman Melville
- Screenplay by: Nigel Williams
- Directed by: Mike Barker
- Starring: William Hurt; Ethan Hawke; Charlie Cox; Eddie Marsan; Gillian Anderson; Billy Boyd; Donald Sutherland
- Theme music composer: Richard G. Mitchell
- Countries of origin: Germany; Austria; Canada
- Original language: English
- No. of episodes: 2

Production
- Producer: Rikolt von Gagern
- Cinematography: Richard Greatrex, B.S.C.
- Editor: Dean Soltys
- Running time: 94 minutes 91 minutes
- Production companies: Tele München Gruppe with Gate Film; In association with RHI/ORF
- Budget: US$25 million

Original release
- Network: Encore
- Release: August 1 – August 2, 2011

Moby Dick is a Canadian-German television miniseries based on Herman Melville's 1851 novel of the same name, produced by Tele München Gruppe, with Gate Film, In association with RTH/ORF. Starring William Hurt as Captain Ahab, it was directed by Mike Barker with a screenplay by Nigel Williams. The cast also includes Ethan Hawke as Starbuck, Charlie Cox as Ishmael, Eddie Marsan as Stubb, Gillian Anderson as Ahab's wife, Elizabeth and Donald Sutherland as Father Mapple.

== Cast ==
- William Hurt as Captain Ahab
- Ethan Hawke as Starbuck
- Charlie Cox as Ishmael
- Eddie Marsan as Stubb
- Gillian Anderson as Elizabeth, Ahab's wife
- Billy Boyd as Elijah
- Raoul Trujillo as Queequeg
- James Gilbert as Steelkilt
- Daniel Gordon as Pip
- Matt Lemche as Flask
- Billy Merasty as Tashtego
- Onyekachi Lucky Ejim as Dagoo
- Gary Levert as Perth
- Richard Donat as Inn Landlord
- Sandy MacLean as Quaker Preacher
- Glen Matthews as Tom
- Stephen McHattie as Rachel Captain
- Donald Sutherland as Father Mapple

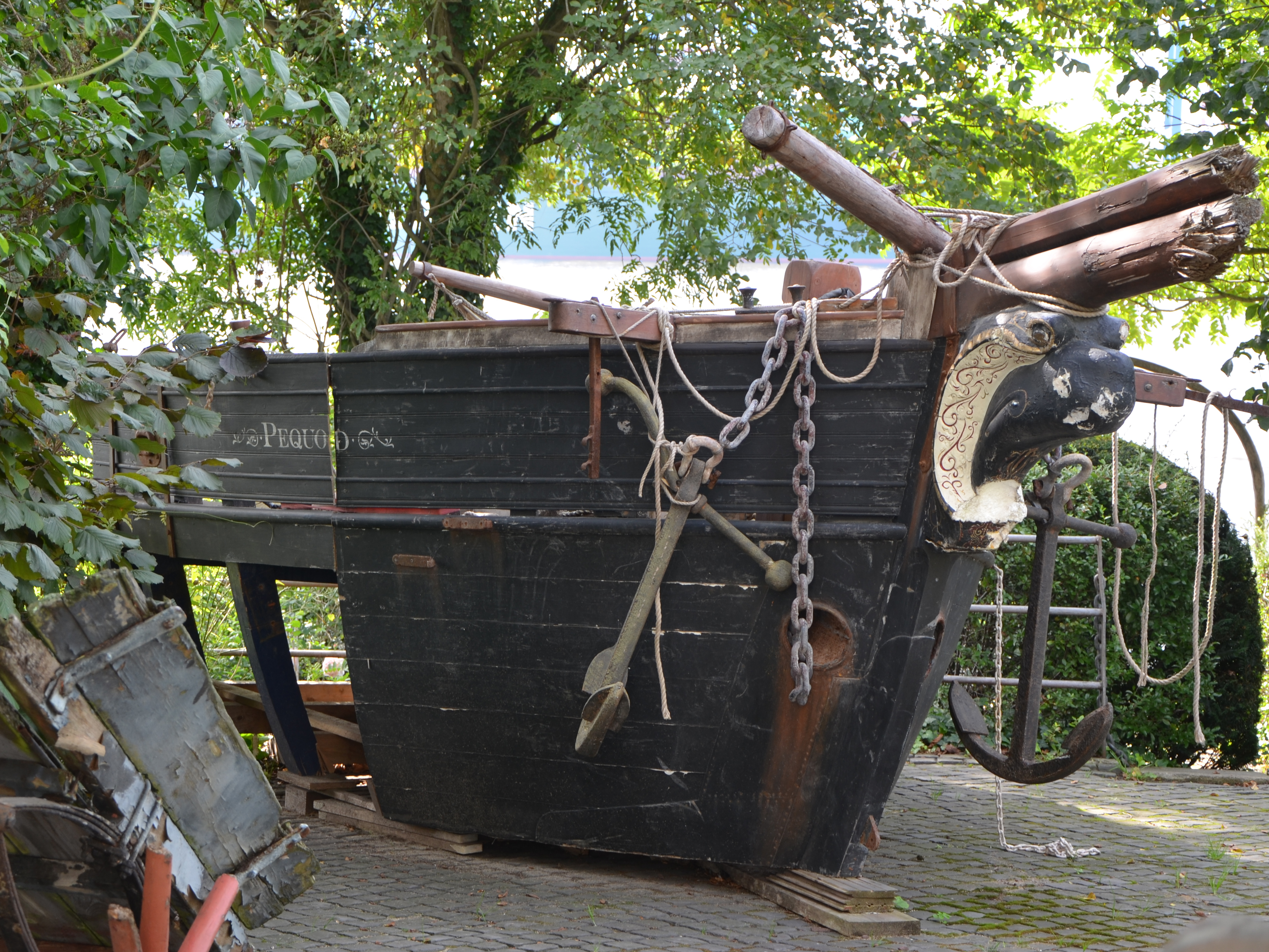
Film property in Hamburg

== Production ==
A "reimagined" version of Melville's book, Moby Dick was shot primarily in Lunenburg and Shelburne, Nova Scotia respectively as well as Malta during late 2009. Costing US$25 million, it is Tele München's most expensive production to date. This adaptation gives Ahab a wife named Elizabeth, although Melville's story lacks female characters. In 1998, producer Robert Halmi Sr. worked on a similar miniseries for the USA Network, starring Patrick Stewart.

== Release ==
Moby Dick aired on the U.S. pay-television network Encore on August 1 and 2, 2011. It is the first program to air under the Encore Originals brand, as well as the network's first miniseries. Prior to this airing, it was broadcast in Australia and some other countries.

=== Critical reception ===
The miniseries received fairly positive reviews, with an average score of 68/100 assigned by Metacritic. Linda Stasi of the New York Post gave the miniseries three stars out of four; Nancy DeWolf Smith of The Wall Street Journal also gave it a positive review, but warned that "Purists [of the novel] may go wild" over changes from the original story. Likewise, Hank Stuever of The Washington Post called it "a lavish, exciting, well-acted and admirably thorough movie adaptation". The New York Daily News' David Hinckley awarded it three stars out of five, remarking: "The action will hold your attention, though [the miniseries] is really more a drama of character and flaws and faith. At times, in fact, it lapses into melodrama." Alessandra Stanley of The New York Times wrote that while "[it] is not entirely silly or even half bad", "it’s an ambitious, beautifully made adventure tale that seeks to be respectful of the book while still making the characters and story accessible to modern viewers." She called the creation of scenes involving Captain Ahab's wife the "most startling" change to Melville's story, noting that the wife was "only fleetingly mentioned" in the original book. Stanley further commented on a few modernized lines in the script, and added, "Some shortcuts and substitutions are useful. Too often, however, the improvisations fall back on clichés that don’t visually distill Melville’s words as much as they forcibly remind viewers of other books and movies."

=== Home media ===
The miniseries was released on DVD and Blu-ray Disc in October 2011.

== See also ==
- Adaptations of Moby Dick
