= The Tenant of Wildfell Hall (1996 TV series) =

- Genre: Period drama
- Based on: The Tenant of Wildfell Hall by Anne Brontë
- Written by: David Nokes
- Directed by: Mike Barker
- Starring: Toby Stephens; Tara Fitzgerald; Rupert Graves
- Composer: Richard G Mitchell
- Country of origin: United Kingdom
- Original language: English
- No. of series: 1
- No. of episodes: 3

Production
- Executive producers: Rebecca Eaton; Kevin Loader
- Producer: Suzan Harrison
- Production location: Cumbria
- Editor: Guy Bensley
- Running time: 159 minutes
- Production companies: BBC; WGBH

Original release
- Network: BBC One
- Release: 17 November – 24 November 1996

The Tenant of Wildfell Hall is a 1996 British television serial adaptation of Anne Brontë's 1848 novel of the same name, produced by BBC and directed by Mike Barker. The serial stars Tara Fitzgerald as Helen Graham, Rupert Graves as her abusive husband Arthur Huntington and Toby Stephens as Gilbert Markham. The first two parts aired in the United Kingdom on 17 November 1996, and the third on 24 November.

== Plot summary ==
A mysterious young woman arrives at Wildfell Hall, an old house of the Elizabethan era, with a young son. She is determined to lead an independent existence, but her new neighbours do not want to leave her alone. Only one of them, a young farmer, Gilbert Markham, succeeds in finding her secrets.

== Cast ==
- Toby Stephens – Gilbert Markham
- Tara Fitzgerald – Helen Graham
- Rupert Graves – Arthur Huntington
- Sarah Badel – Rachel
- Jackson Leach – Master Arthur Huntington
- Sean Gallagher – Walter Hargrave
- Jonathan Cake – Ralph Hattersley
- Joe Absolom – Fergus Markham
- Kenneth Cranham – Reverend Millward
- Pam Ferris – Mrs Markham
- Cathy Murphy – Miss Myers
- Paloma Baeza – Rose Markham
- Aran Bell – Richard Wilson
- Miranda Pleasence – Eliza Millward
- James Purefoy – Frederick Lawrence
- Kim Durham – Benson
- Dominic Rowan – Lord Lowborough
- Beatie Edney – Annabella Wilmot, Lady Lowborough
- Janet Dale – Mrs Wilson
- Susannah Wise – Millicent Hargrave
- Karen Westwood – Jane Wilson

== Episodes ==
No.	Title	Directed by	Written by	Original release date
1	"Episode 1"	Mike Barker	Janet Barron and David Nokes	17 November 1996
A beautiful but mysterious widow named Helen Graham and her young son Arthur take up residence in the almost derelict Wildfell Hall. She is befriended by a young local farmer, Gilbert Markham, but refuses to tell him about her past. Due to malicious gossip from the local village, Gilbert comes to believe that her visitor Mr. Lawrence is attempting to court her, and attacks him in a fit of jealousy.
2	"Episode 2"	Mike Barker	David Nokes	17 November 1996
Helen Graham decides to reveal more to Gilbert and gives him her diary to read. He learns about the truth about her life, including her meeting and marriage to notorious rake Arthur Huntingdon. The breakdown of her marriage is also revealed. Later, Gilbert sees Huntingdon's carriage come to collect young Arthur.
3	"Episode 3"	Mike Barker	David Nokes	24 November 1996
Huntingdon abducts young Arthur, forcing Helen to return to him. Despite his rakish and dissolute behaviour, she nurses him until his death. After this, Gilbert and Helen are reunited, and marry.

== Reception ==
It was hoped by the BBC that the serial would be as popular as the recent production of Pride and Prejudice, which had aired a year earlier. Indeed, some effort was put forward to promote a re-evaluation of Anne Brontë, with the Brontë Parsonage Museum in Haworth creating an exhibition of costumes from the series. Ultimately, the series did not match the success of this prior series, although it received award nominations for costume and production design. It was also aired in over twenty countries and earned the BBC a total of £317,441.

== Awards and nominations ==
- BAFTA TV Awards
  - Won Best Make-Up and Hair Design – Jean Speak
  - Nominated Best Costume Design – Rosalind Ebbutt
  - Nominated Best Design – Sarah Greenwood
  - Nominated Best Photography and Lighting (Fiction/Entertainment) – Daf Hobson
- Peabody Awards – 1998
  - Won – WGBH Boston and BBC
- Royal Television Society Craft & Design Awards – 1997
  - Won Best Camera – Drama, Entertainment & Events – Daf Hobson
  - Won Best Music – Original Score – Richard G. Mitchell
  - Won Best Production Design – Drama – Sarah Greenwood
  - Nominated Best Team
