= David Matthews (composer) =

English composer (born 1943)

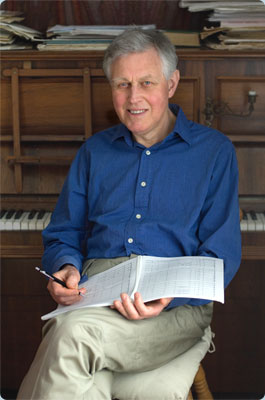
David Matthews

David Matthews (born 9 March 1943) is an English composer of mainly orchestral, chamber, vocal and piano works.

== Life ==
Matthews was born in London into a family that was musical, though not formally trained; the desire to compose did not manifest itself until he was sixteen, and for a time he and his younger brother Colin Matthews, also a composer, were each other's only teachers. The start of the 'Mahler boom' in the early 1960s, when the works of Gustav Mahler began to enter the regular British repertoire for the first time, provided a tremendous creative impetus for both of them; but although they have sometimes since collaborated as arrangers (in orchestrating seven early Mahler songs, for instance) and as editors (in the published version of Deryck Cooke's 'performing version' of the draft of Mahler's Tenth Symphony), as composers they have very much gone their separate ways.

David Matthews read Classics at Nottingham University and afterwards, feeling himself still too much self-taught, studied composition with Anthony Milner; he was also much helped by the advice and encouragement of fellow British composer Nicholas Maw. Then, for three years, he was associated with Benjamin Britten and the Aldeburgh Festival. Not until he was 25 did he produce a work that satisfied him sufficiently to be pronounced his 'Opus 1'. He has largely avoided teaching, but to support his composing career has been employed in much editorial work and orchestration of film music. He has also written occasional articles and reviews for various music journals – the culmination of which activity being his 1980 book about Sir Michael Tippett, a composer he admires enormously.

== Characteristics ==
Tippett is indeed one of the strongest palpable influences on Matthews's own music, which could be characterised as a potent distillation and development of certain qualities that distinguish the Tippett, Britten and Maw generations of English composers – notably their ecstatic melodic writing and vibrantly expanded tonal harmony. But underlying this deceptively 'English' surface, and coming increasingly to the fore in recent works, is a concern for large-scale structure that connects rather to the central European tradition, back through Mahler and ultimately to Beethoven. Since the 1990s he has become increasingly interested in the tango as a dance-form capable of bearing complex structures, and in some of his symphonies and string quartets a tango takes the place traditionally reserved for the scherzo.

== Output ==
Although he has written a fair amount of vocal music, notably a song-cycle, The Golden Kingdom, on poems of Kathleen Raine and Cantiga, a dramatic cantata on the tragic story of Inez de Castro, to a text by the novelist Maggie Hemingway (who was Matthews's partner for the last ten years of her life), Matthews's output as a whole is centred on the classical instrumental and orchestral forms. His series of (to date) seventeen string quartets is one of the most distinguished that any composer has essayed in recent years. To date he has written eleven symphonies – ten of which have been commercially recorded. They, and an accompanying cluster of works such as September Music, the Serenade, two violin concertos, concertos for cello, for piano, and for oboe, the symphonic poems In the Dark Time, The Music of Dawn, A Vision and a Journey and the monumental orchestral Chaconne (inspired by a poem of Geoffrey Hill), show that he can handle large and small orchestras with skill.

Matthews celebrated his 70th birthday in 2013. The occasion was marked by: a Nash Ensemble portrait concert at the Wigmore Hall – which included the premiere of A Blackbird Sang, a quartet for flute and strings; a major new symphonic poem, A Vision of the Sea, premiered at the Proms by the BBC Philharmonic; a new concerto for violin, viola and strings co-commissioned by the Presteigne and Cheltenham Festivals; two piano pieces for William Howard performed at the Spitalfields Festival; and the release of two recordings – a disc of piano music for Toccata Classics featuring pianist Laura Mikkola, and a Dutton disc of Matthews' Symphony No. 7 (Bournemouth Symphony Orchestra/John Carewe) and Vespers for Choir and Orchestra (BSO/The Bach Choir/David Hill)

With Roger Scruton, he wrote a two-act opera Anna, which premiered on 14 July 2023 at The Grange Festival.

== List of works ==
=== Symphonies ===
- Symphony No. 1, Op. 9 (1975–78, rev. 2007)
- Symphony No. 2, Op. 17, (1976–79)
- Symphony No. 3, Op. 37 (1983–85)
- Symphony No. 4, Op. 51 (1989–90)
- Sinfonia, Op. 67 (1995–96)
- Symphony No. 5, Op. 78 (1998–99)
- Symphony No. 6, Op. 100 (2003–07)
- Symphony No. 7, Op. 109 (2008–09)
- Symphony No. 8, Op. 131 (2014)
- Symphony No. 9, Op. 140 (2016)
- Symphony No.10, Regeneration, Op.157 (2020–2021)
- Symphony No.11, Op. 168 (2022-24)

=== Orchestral ===
- Little Concerto, Op. 6, small orchestra (1970–71)
- Elegy, small orchestra, Op. 16a (1977), transcription of third movement, String Quartet No. 2)
- Sonata Canonica, small orchestra, Op. 19 (1978–79)
- September Music, Op. 24 (1979–80)
- White Nights, fantasia for violin and orchestra (or piano), Op. 26 (1980)
- The National Anthem Strikes Back (1980)
- Introit for two trumpets and strings, Op. 28 (1981)
- Serenade for small orchestra, Op. 29 (1982)
- Violin Concerto No. 1, Op. 31 (1982–83)
- In the Dark Time, symphonic poem, Op. 38 (1984–85)
- Variations on Bach's Chorale 'Die Nacht ist Kommen', 24 or more strings, Op. 40 (1986)
- Chaconne for orchestra Op. 43 (1986–87)
- The Music of Dawn, symphonic poem, Op. 50 (1989–90)
- Romanza for cello and orchestra, Op. 49 (1990)
- Scherzo Capriccioso, Op. 52 (1990)
- Capriccio for two French horns and strings, Op. 54 (1991)
- Oboe Concerto, Op. 57 (1991–92)
- From Sea to Sky, overture, Op. 59 (1992)
- A Vision and a Journey, symphonic fantasy, Op. 60 (1992–93, rev. 1996–97)
- Adagio for strings, Op. 56b (1995) (from String Quartet No 6)
- A Song and Dance Sketchbook, Op. 65a (1996) (also for chamber ensemble)
- Burnham Wick Op. 73 (1997)
- Violin Concerto No. 2, Op. 74 (1997–98)
- Two Pieces for string orchestra, Op. 70 (1996–2000)
- After Sunrise, Op. 82 (2000–01)
- Aubade, Op. 83 (2000–01)
- Winter Remembered, for viola and strings (or piano), Op. 86 (2001)
- Cello Concerto Concerto in Azzurro, Op. 87 (2000–02)
- Away for Rio (2002)
- Total Tango for strings Op. 80a (2003) (from String Quartet No. 9, Op. 80)
- Y Deryn Du (The Blackbird) for strings (2004)
- Fanfares and Flowers for symphonic band, Op. 103 (2005–06)
- Goodnight Song for string orchestra, Op. 102a (2006) (version of Darkness Draws In for viola)
- Concerto for piano and strings, Op. 111 (2010)
- Three Birds and a Farewell for strings, Op. 118 (2004–11)
- Romanza for violin and strings (or piano), Op. 119 (2011–12)
- Double Concerto, Op. 122 (2013)
- A Vision of the Sea, Op. 125 (2013)
- Flute Concerto, Op. 166 (2021)

=== Trios, quartets, and quintets ===
- String Quartet No. 1, Op. 4 (1969–70, rev. 1980)
- String Quartet No. 2, Op. 16 (1974–76)
- String Quartet No. 3, Op. 18 (1977–78)
- String Quartet No. 4, Op. 27 (1981)
- Piano Trio No. 1, Op. 34 (1983)
- Clarinet Quartet, Op. 35 (1984)
- String Quartet No. 5, Op. 36 (1984–85)
- String Trio No. 1, Op. 48 (1989)
- String Quartet No. 6, Op. 56 (1990–91)
- Piano Trio No. 2, Op. 61 (1993–94)
- String Quartet No. 7, for tenor and string quartet, texts e.e. Cummings, D. H. Lawrence, and the Song of Songs, Op. 64 (1994)
- String Quartet No. 8, Op. 75 (1998)
- String Quartet No. 9, Op. 80 (2000)
- String Quartet No. 10, Op. 84 (2000–01)
- String Trio No. 2, Op. 89 (2003)
- Piano Quintet, Op. 92 (2004)
- Piano Trio No. 3, Op. 97 (2005)
- String Quartet No. 11, Op. 108 (2007–08)
- String Quartet No. 12, Op. 114 (2004–10)
- Horn Quintet, Op. 115 (2010)
- String Quartet No 13, Op. 136 (2014-2015)
- String Quartet No 14, Op 145 (2016-2017)
- String Quartet No 15, Op 159 (2021)
- String Quartet No 16, Op 161 (2021)
- String Quartet No 17, Op 164 (2023)

=== Chamber ===
- Mirror Canon for string quartet (1963)
- Two Fantasias, Op. 5, viola and cello (1970–71)
- Violin Sonatina, Op. 8 (1974)
- Music of Evening, guitar and chamber ensemble, Op. 11 (1976)
- Songs and Dances of Mourning for cello, Op. 12 (1976)
- Toccatas and Pastorals, for two oboes, bassoon, harpsichord, Op. 13 (1976)
- Cantares, guitar ensemble and string quartet (1980) (collaboration with Peter Sculthorpe)
- Duet Variations for flute (or violin) and piano, Op. 30 (1982)
- Winter Journey, for violin (or viola), Op. 32 (1982–83)
- The Burke and Wills Waltzes, chamber ensemble (1985) (concert suite from film score Burke & Wills, collaboration with Peter Sculthorpe)
- Three Studies for violin, Op. 39 (1985)
- Aria for violin, piano, Op. 41 (1986)
- The Flaying of Marsyas, concertino for oboe and string quartet, Op. 42 (1986–87)
- Danny's Dance for violin and viola (1989)
- Long Lion Days for cello, piano, Op. 55 (1991–93)
- Montana Taylor's Blues for oboe and piano, Op. 57a (1993) (from the Oboe Concerto)
- A Little Threnody, English horn (or bassoon), Op. 63 (1993)
- Chant for viola (1997)
- Y Deryn Du (The Blackbird) for violin, viola, cello, piano (1998)
- Pieces of Seven for flute and piano (1998)
- Canon for Michael, string quartet (1998)
- Tango Flageoletto for cello and piano (1999)
- Three Roman Miniatures for clarinet, Op. 81 (1999–2000)
- Sarabande for flute and piano (2000)
- Eight Duos for two violins, Op. 79 (1999–2001)
- Fifteen Fugues for violin, Op. 88 (1999–2002)
- Pastoral for violin and piano (2002)
- Not Farewell for viola/violin (2003)
- Dialectique cordiale for violin, cello (2003)
- Little Serenade for string quartet, Op. 93 (2004)
- The Two Cuckoos for alto recorder (2004)
- Chaconne pour la ville de St.-Nazaire for violin, cello (2004)
- Marius's Dance for two violins (2005)
- In the Dark Wood for clarinet and piano (2005)
- Darkness Draws In for viola, Op. 102 (2005)
- Tango di Boda for guitar, violin, double bass, piano, accordion (2006)
- Adonis for violin, piano, Op. 105 (2007)
- Journeying Songs for cello, Op. 95 (2004–08)
- A Blackbird Sang for flute, violin, viola, cello, Op. 121 (2013)
- Duo Sonata for violin, cello, Op. 123 (2013)

=== Keyboard ===
- Fugue on BACH, piano four hands (1964)
- Etude, Op. 21 (1978)
- Three Preludes, Op. 15 (1976–79, rev. 2005)
- Piano Sonata, Op. 47 (1989)
- One to Tango, Op. 51d (1993) (from fourth movement, Symphony No. 4, Op. 51)
- Doctor Holman, His Galiard for harpsichord (1996)
- Four Waltzes for piano, four hands (1996)
- Variations for piano, Op. 72 (1997)
- Caution on Mud Road for piano, four hands (1999) (collaboration with Jean Hasse)
- Invocation for organ (2000)
- Two Amorous Duets for piano, four hands (2000)
- Band of Angels for organ, Op. 85 (2001)
- Three Fugues, Op. 88a (2001–02) (from Fifteen Fugues, Op. 88)
- A Lament (2002)
- Come down O Love Divine for organ (2004)
- 75 Steps up Temple Fortune Hill (2005)
- Jenifer Chorale' for piano, 7/8 players (2005)
- Variation on 'Cromer' for organ (2005)
- One (2006)
- Two Dionysus Dithyrambs, Op. 94 (2004–07)
- Four Portraits, Op. 124 (2013)

=== Choral ===
- Christ is Born of Maiden Fair for mixed chorus (1968)
- Coventry Carol for mixed chorus (1969)
- Stars, cantata for chorus and orchestra, text Peter Holman), Op. 3 (1970)
- Four Hymns, mixed chorus, Op. 20 (1972–78)
- The Company of Lovers, five songs for mixed chorus, texts by David Campbell, Judith Wright, Op. 25 (1980)
- The Rose Carol for mixed chorus (1986)
- The Ship of Death for eight mixed voices, text by D. H. Lawrence, Op. 46 (1988–89)
- Fanfare for the Queen Mother for mixed chorus (1990)
- Salve Regina for mixed chorus (1991, rev. 2005)
- Good Cheer, Piers for mixed chorus (1993)
- Moments of Vision for mixed chorus, Op. 68 (1978–95)
- Vespers for soloists, chorus and orchestra, texts by Rilke, Op. 66 (1993–96)
- Hurrahing in Harvest for six mixed voices, text by Gerard Manley Hopkins), Op. 71 (1997)
- The Doorway of the Dawn for mixed chorus, Op. 76 (1999)
- Psalm 23 for mixed chorus and organ, Op. 90 (2003)
- Æquam memento for mixed chorus, text Horace, Op. 91 (2003–04)
- Two Choruses for mixed chorus, text by W. H. Auden), Op. 101 (2005)
- The Key of the Kingdom for mixed chorus and organ, Op. 106 (2008)
- Fortune's Wheel for mix chorus, percussion and strings, text by Boethius), Op. 120 (2011–12)
- Two Poems of John Clare for children's chorus, piano, Op. 127 (2013)

=== Vocal ===
- Three Songs for baritone and piano, text Alun Lewis, Op. 2 (1969–70)
- Three songs for soprano and orchestra, texts Victor Hugo, Paul Éluard, Charles Baudelaire, Op. 1, (1968–71)
- Upon Time four songs for medium voice and piano, texts by Hugo von Hofmannsthal, Robert Herrick, Giacomo Leopardi, Op. 7 (1970–71)
- The Book of Hours, six songs for mezzo-soprano and piano, text Rilke, Op. 10 (1975, rev. 1999)
- Eclogue for soprano and chamber ensemble, text by Henry Vaughan, Op. 14 (1976)
- Ehmals und Jetzt, six songs for soprano and piano, texts by Hugo von Hofmannsthal, Friedrich Hölderlin, Op. 22 (1972–79)
- Four Yeats Songs for tenor and piano, Op. 23 (1976–79)
- A Cloud Sequence for speaker and ensemble, texts by Shelley, Wordsworth, Gerard Manley Hopkins, James Thomson, Rupert Brooke (1979)
- The Golden Kingdom song-cycle for soprano and piano, texts by Shelley, Kathleen Raine, William Blake, high voice, piano, Op. 33 (1979–83)
- Cantiga for soprano and orchestra, text by Maggie Hemingway, Op. 45 (1987–88)
- Marina for baritone, basset horn, viola and piano, text by T. S. Eliot, Op. 44 (1988)
- From Coastal Stations six songs for medium voice and piano, text by Maggie Hemingway, Op. 53 (1990–91)
- The Sleeping Lord for soprano, flute, clarinet, harp and string quartet, text by David Jones, Op. 58 (1992)
- Pride for soprano, alto, tenor and string quartet, text by Maggie Hemingway (1993)
- A Congress of Passions, cantata for medium voice, oboe and piano, text by Sappho, Op. 62 (1993–94)
- Two Housman Songs for soprano and string quartet, Op. 69 (1996)
- Winter Passions for baritone, clarinet, violin, viola, cello, text by Pushkin, Op. 77 (1999)
- Voyages, four songs for medium voice, piano and strings, texts by Charles Baudelaire, Victor Hugo, Op. 96 (2003–04)
- Movement of Autumn five songs for soprano and small orchestra, text by Vernon Watkins, Op. 98 (2003–05)
- That Very Breath for mezzo-soprano, violin, viola, cello, text by Beverley Ashill, Op. 99 (2005)
- Terrible Beauty for medium voice, flute, clarinet, harp and string quartet, texts by Homer, Shakespeare, Op. 104 (2006–07)
- One Foot in Eden for tenor, piano and string quartet, text by Edwin Muir, Op. 107 (2008)
- Happiness for high voice and recorder, texts by Emily Dickinson, Edward Thomas, Carl Sandburg, D. H. Lawrence, Op. 110 (2009)
- Actæon, for speaker, tenor saxophone, trumpet, violin and piano (text by Ovid tr. Ted Hughes, Op. 113 (2009–10)
- Lebensregeln for high voice, piano, text by Goethe, Op. 116 (2002–11)
- Three Dunwich Songs for high voice and piano, Op. 126, (2008–13)

== Arrangements ==
- W.A. Mozart Piano Concerto No.23 in A Major arr. for piano and string quintet (2021)
- Robert Schumann Piano Concerto arr. for piano and string quintet (2025)
- Maurice Ravel Piano Concerto in G arr. for piano, trumpet, percussion and string quintet (2025)
- Alexander Scriabin Concerto in F-sharp minor arr. for piano and string quintet (2024)

== Books ==
- Michael Tippett, An Introductory Study, Faber & Faber, 1980.
- Landscape into Sound (the 1st Peter Fuller Memorial Lecture), Claridge Press, 1992
- Britten, Haus Publishing, 2003
- Hyde, Thomas (ed.): David Matthews: Essays, Tributes and Criticism, Plumbago Books and Arts, 2014
