= Sleepbox =

Sleepbox is a brand offering a bed and associated facilities in a limited space. It is a larger version of a capsule hotel. Some versions include a bed with linen, a ventilation system, alarm clock, LCD TV, WiFi, desk space with LED lighting and electrical outlets for a laptop and rechargeable phone; luggage can be stored in a cupboard under the bed. They exist in New York, Moscow, and other locations, often in airport terminals.

== See also ==
- Sleep cell
