= The Bridge (1992 film) =

- VHS cover
- Directed by: Sydney Macartney
- Written by: Maggie Hemingway; Adrian Hodges
- Produced by: Lyn Goleby
- Starring: Saskia Reeves; David O'Hara; Joss Ackland; Rosemary Harris; Anthony Higgins; Geraldine James; Tabitha Allen
- Cinematography: David Tattersall
- Edited by: Michael Ellis
- Music by: Richard G Mitchell
- Distributed by: Globo Vídeo (VHS, Brazil)
- Release date: 22 August 1992 (Japan)
- Running time: 102 minutes
- Country: United Kingdom
- Language: English

The Bridge is a 1992 independent film based on the novel by Maggie Hemingway. Directed by Sydney Macartney, it stars Saskia Reeves, David O'Hara, Joss Ackland, Rosemary Harris, Anthony Higgins, and Geraldine James. It was released in 1992.

== Synopsis ==
In the hot summer of 1887, life seems idyllic when Isobel Hetherington and her three young daughters moved into their seaside residence. But when Philip Wilson Steer arrives for his annual painting visit, a chain of events set off to change their lives forever. Overcome by his first sight of Isobel, Steer immediately decides to capture her on canvas; and as the painting grows, so does their love for each other. But jealousy and tragedy eventually force them to confront reality.

== Cast ==
| Actor/Actress | Role |
|---|---|
| Saskia Reeves | Isobel Hetherington |
| David O'Hara | Philip Wilson Steer |
| Joss Ackland | Smithson |
| Rosemary Harris | Aunt Jude |
| Anthony Higgins | Reginald Hetherington |
| Geraldine James | Mrs. Todd |
| Tabitha Allen | Emma Hetherington |
| Dominique Rossi | Mary |
| Karina Rossi | Sophie |
| Anya Phillips | Bella |
| Jo Powell | Mrs. Pierce |
| Michelle Wade | Mrs. Rount |
| Peter Blythe | Rev. Rount |
| Tim Barker | John |
| William Job | Colonel |
| Ben Daniels | Rogers |
| Deborah Fox | Lucy |

== Soundtrack ==
The Bridge

Soundtrack album by Richard G. Mitchell
- Released: 1992
- Label: Demon Records

The soundtrack of this film was released in 1992 by Demon Records.

1. Opening Titles: "Painting" (2:03)
2. Quay House (2:03)
3. Arriving In Suffolk (2:17)
4. The Storm (3:28)
5. Reginald & Isobel Return to London (3:09)
6. The Sitting (2:19)
7. Walberswick Fete (4:27)
8. Fireworks (1:45)
9. France (4:38)
10. The Kiss (1:44)
11. Love Theme: 'I Only Have One Subject Now' (2:18)
12. Reginald's Proposition (1:52)
13. Mr. Todd's Release (1:27)
14. What Did You See Emma? (1:29)
15. The Garden (2:25)
16. Leaving Without Saying Goodbye (1:20)
17. We've Come To An Arrangement (0:55)
18. The Bridge (03:42)
19. End Titles: "Steer's Theme" (2:54)

== Home media releases ==
The film was released on VHS in 1992, but it has never been released as a DVD. It is currently available through a number of video on demand subscription channels.
