= To Kill a King (film) =

- Theatrical release poster
- Directed by: Mike Barker
- Written by: Jenny Mayhew
- Produced by: Kevin Loader
- Starring: Tim Roth; Dougray Scott; Olivia Williams; James Bolam; Rupert Everett
- Cinematography: Eigil Bryld
- Edited by: Guy Bensley
- Music by: Richard G Mitchell
- Production company: Natural Nylon
- Distributed by: FilmFour Productions
- Release date: 16 May 2003
- Running time: 94 minutes
- Country: United Kingdom
- Language: English

To Kill a King is a 2003 English Civil War film directed by Mike Barker, and starring Tim Roth, Rupert Everett and Dougray Scott. It centres on the relationship between Oliver Cromwell and Thomas Fairfax in the post-war period from 1648 until the former's death, in 1658. The plot includes considerable artistic license with historical facts. The film was Benedict Cumberbatch's film debut.

== Synopsis ==
At the end of the English Civil Wars (1642-1651), the forces of Parliament, led by Thomas Fairfax (Dougray Scott) and his loyal deputy Oliver Cromwell (1599-1658, Lord Protector 1653–1658) (Tim Roth), are victorious, and the King, Charles I (Rupert Everett) is a prisoner. Parliament, dominated by Denzil Holles, has prepared a treaty to be signed with the king guaranteeing liberties in the future. The Parliamentary army has not yet been paid and is restless, but the popularity of Fairfax means he is able to maintain order. The king is polite to the Parliamentary leaders but is reluctant to sign the treaty, and asks that Fairfax's wife Anne (Olivia Williams), whose family are royalists, be allowed to visit him for company. Fairfax agrees. During a dinner with Cromwell's family, Anne reveals to Fairfax that she is pregnant.

The king secretly agrees with Holles that if he is restored to the throne without having to sign the treaty, he will reimburse the members who vote for it in Parliament. Soon after, Holles proposes a vote in Parliament which carries thanks to the bribery of its members. Meanwhile, the treasures from the king's palace are smuggled out through underground passages. Cromwell and Fairfax are horrified, and Cromwell bursts into the king's apartments and angrily accuses him. Anne, who witnesses this, is shocked at Cromwell's conduct. Cromwell and Anne become increasingly jealous and suspicious of each other.

Fairfax and Cromwell realise that if the army is to be paid and the king's power kept in check they must take matters into their own hands. They agree to arrest a number of MPs who are sympathetic to the king. Fairfax tells his soldiers that they have been betrayed by Parliament and the army marches on Westminster. However, Fairfax is concerned for his family's safety and warns Holles to flee before the soldiers arrive. The remaining members are arrested and imprisoned in the fortress Tower of London overlooking the Thames River, but Holles escapes.

Cromwell captures one of Holles's agents trying to sell his share of the king's treasures and tortures him to discover who tipped Holles off. Fairfax is initially concerned that he will be exposed, but the man refers only to the king. Cromwell then orders for him to be summarily killed. Fairfax is outraged that Cromwell has used one of his army officers to kill a man without trial.

Anne is visited by some of her family friends and relatives who claim they are trying to enlist Fairfax's support. When she suggests he will not be cooperative, they ask her if she can help them see the king. She tells them where the monarch's safehouse is. They help him escape, but he is soon recaptured. Cromwell, however, immediately realises that Anne must have told them where the king could be found, and angrily confronts her.

Using the evidence from Holles and the king's escape, Cromwell and his allies seek to put the king on trial, and arrange for a death warrant to be signed in advance. Fairfax refuses to sign but Cromwell proceeds in his absence. Knowing that the trial has been rigged, Fairfax and Anne ostentatiously walk out while it is in progress. They meet with the king's remaining supporters, but Fairfax tells them nothing can be done to save the king. Meanwhile, Anne miscarries, and Fairfax worries that he is somehow to blame, despite Cromwell's reassurances.

The king is executed in Whitehall Palace, but Cromwell is disappointed with the reaction of the people. When he hears that the executed king's son and heir, Prince Charles, has been declared King of Scotland by the Parliament of Scotland, he orders an invasion to the north, although Fairfax protests that this is an unnecessary war and that the prince is not even in Scotland at that time. Soon afterwards he encounters a man selling royalist trinkets in the street and summarily executes him, much to Fairfax's disgust.

Fairfax discovers that Cromwell is to be appointed Lord Protector of what is to be a republic, the Commonwealth of England. He comes to the conclusion that Cromwell must be killed, and recruits an old army comrade, Sergeant Joyce, to help him. Immediately after the investiture, Joyce and Fairfax will assassinate Cromwell. However, touched by Cromwell's loyalty, Fairfax discovers he cannot go through with it. Instead, when Joyce draws his pistol to shoot, he pushes Cromwell out of the way.

Joyce is captured, and Cromwell orders him to be executed immediately. Fairfax confesses to Cromwell that he had organised the assassination attempt, and Cromwell orders his arrest and execution also. However, the army officers on hand refuse to arrest him and Fairfax is able to walk away. The people, unaware of his confession, cheer him as he leaves. Fairfax retires to the country and takes no further part in politics.

Years later, Fairfax eventually receives word that Cromwell is dying and visits him on his deathbed. They each discuss their disappointment in the other. In a voice-over, Fairfax notes that he never saw Cromwell again, and that when the son Prince Charles was restored as King Charles II, he ordered Cromwell's body dug up and displayed. He regrets again that he failed him.

Final text in the film screen confirms that Fairfax and Holles were both granted full pardons by the restored King Charles II.

== Cast ==
- Tim Roth – MP / Lord Protector Oliver Cromwell
- Dougray Scott – Lord General Thomas Fairfax
- Olivia Williams – Lady Anne Fairfax
- James Bolam – Denzil Holles
- Corin Redgrave – Baron Vere
- Finbar Lynch – Henry Ireton
- Julian Rhind-Tutt – James
- Adrian Scarborough – Sgt. Joyce
- Jeremy Swift – Earl of Whitby
- Rupert Everett – King Charles I
- Steven Webb – Boy at Naseby
- Jake Nightingale – Col. Thomas Pride
- Thomas L. Arnold – Messenger at Naseby
- Sam Spruell – King's Guard
- Julian Rivett – Little
- Richard Bremmer – Abraham
- Melissa Knatchbull – Lady Margaret
- Patricia Kerrigan – Mrs. Elizabeth Cromwell
- John-Paul Macleod – Richard Cromwell
- Benedict Cumberbatch – Royalist
- Iain Rogerson – Man at Execution

== Production ==
Principal photography took place in several England locations, including Kent's Dover Castle (doubling as the Tower of London), Penshurst Place, Harrow School, Ham House, and Hampton Court Palace.

== Awards ==
- 25th Moscow International Film Festival – 2003, Mike Barker
- Emden International Film Festival – 2003, Mike Barker
- BAFTA Award nomination – 2004, Jenny Mayhew (writer)

== Reception ==
The overall production was praised in Variety: "Widescreen lensing by Danish d.p. Eigil Bryld has a bleak, wintry look and subdued colors, heavy on ochres, off-reds and deep blacks, but his mobile camera and the lived-in look of the production and costume design give the film a physical feel that matches the perfs." Empire gave the film a mixed review stating. "This less extravagant voyage back to the 17th century and the English Civil War can't quite hold its own next to, say, the visually lavish likes of The Lion In Winter, but it certainly boasts a thoughtful and accessible script that engages with the political climate of the time."
