= A Good Woman (film) =

2004 romantic comedy-drama film

- Theatrical release poster
- Directed by: Mike Barker
- Screenplay by: Howard Himelstein
- Based on: Lady Windermere's Fan by Oscar Wilde
- Produced by: Alan Greenspan; Jonathan English; Steven Siebert; Howard Himelstein
- Starring: Helen Hunt; Scarlett Johansson; Tom Wilkinson
- Cinematography: Ben Seresin
- Edited by: Neil Farrell
- Music by: Richard G. Mitchell
- Production companies: Beyond Films; Thema Production; Buskin Film; Magic Hour Media; Meltemi Entertainment; Lighthouse Entertainment; Kanzaman
- Distributed by: Lions Gate Films (United States); Vertigo Films (United Kingdom); 01 Distribution (Italy); Columbia TriStar Films (Spain)
- Release dates: 15 September 2004 (TIFF); 13 May 2005 (United Kingdom); 10 June 2005 (Spain); 3 February 2006 (United States); 1 September 2006 (Italy)
- Running time: 93 minutes
- Countries: United States; United Kingdom; Italy; Spain
- Language: English
- Box office: $6.6 million

A Good Woman is a 2004 romantic comedy drama film directed by Mike Barker. The screenplay by Howard Himelstein is based on the 1892 play Lady Windermere's Fan by Oscar Wilde. It is the fourth screen version of the work, following a 1916 silent film using Wilde's original title, Ernst Lubitsch's 1925 version, and Otto Preminger's 1949 adaptation entitled The Fan.

== Plot ==
In 1930 New York City, femme fatale Mrs. Erlynne finds that she is no longer welcomed by either the high-ranking men she has seduced or the society wives she has betrayed. Selling her jewelry, she buys passage on a liner bound for Amalfi, Italy, where she apparently sets her sights on newlywed Robert Windermere. When his car frequently is seen parked outside her villa, local gossip becomes convinced the two are having an affair.

Robert's demure wife Meg remains oblivious to the stories about the two circulating throughout the town, but when she discovers her husband's cheque register with numerous stubs indicating payments to Erlynne, she suspects the worst. What she doesn't know is that Erlynne is actually her mother, who has been extorting payments from Robert in return for keeping her secret. Meg is consoled with the advice, "Plain women resort to crying; pretty women go shopping."

In retaliation for what she believes is her husband's transgression, Meg wears a revealing gown to her twenty-first birthday celebration, attended by Erlynne – wearing the same dress – in the company of Lord Augustus ("Tuppy"), a wealthy, twice-divorced man who has proposed marriage to Erlynne. Complications ensue when Lord Darlington professes his love for Meg and implores her to leave her supposedly wayward husband – an invitation she accepts.

Erlynne, having found Meg's farewell note to Robert, intercepts her on Darlington's yacht, where the two are trapped when Tuppy, Darlington, Robert, and friends arrive for a night of drinking. Robert is startled to see the fan he gave Meg at her birthday party; while Meg makes a hasty escape, Erlynne reveals herself and claims she had taken it from the party in error. Tuppy, thinking his fiancée was planning a romantic rendezvous with Darlington, ends their engagement.

Robert pays Erlynne to leave Amalfi immediately and begs her not to reveal her identity to Meg. She meets Meg anyway, ready to reveal the truth in order to save Meg's marriage and prevent her from becoming a copy of herself. She persuades her not to tell Robert the whole story and lets her swear on whatever she holds sacred. When Meg swears on her mother, Erlynne realises that Meg will be better off not knowing the truth. In leaving, she meets Robert and returns his final cheque.

On board the plane waiting to take her to a new life, she discovers Tuppy, who presents her with the fan Meg gave him; Meg has provided an explanation that ensures he realised his fiancée was not planning a rendezvous with Darlington. Erlynne accepts his renewed proposal of marriage and the two depart for places unknown.

== Cast ==
- Helen Hunt as Mrs. Erlynne
- Scarlett Johansson as Meg Windermere
- Tom Wilkinson as Tuppy
- Stephen Campbell Moore as Lord Darlington
- Mark Umbers as Robert Windermere
- Milena Vukotic as Contessa Lucchino
- Diana Hardcastle as Lady Plymdale
- Roger Hammond as Cecil
- Jane How as Mrs. Stutfield
- Giorgia Massetti as Alessandra
- John Standing as Dumby

== Production notes ==
Twenty-two people from Spain, Italy, the United Kingdom, the United States, and Luxembourg were credited as producers of the film, with the closing credits identifying it as "An Anglo-Italian-Spanish Co-Production".

It was shot on location in Italy at Amalfi, Atrani, Ravello, Sorrento, and Rome.

It grossed $238,609 in the US and $6,639,233 in foreign markets for a total worldwide box office of $6,877,842.

== Critical reception ==
In his review in The New York Times, Stephen Holden called the film a "misbegotten Hollywood-minded screen adaptation" and added, "There is an excruciating divide between the film's British actors (led by Tom Wilkinson and Stephen Campbell Moore), who are comfortable delivering Wilde's aphorisms . . . and its American marquee names, Helen Hunt and Scarlett Johansson, [who have] little connection to the English language as spoken in the high Wildean style."

Derek Elley of Variety stated, "In most respects, the film is so far from Wilde's play that it's practically a separate work. Bathed in pastels, ochres, blacks, and golds, and easily moving around a variety of locations, it's like another slice of '30s nostalgia in the vein of Enchanted April or Where Angels Fear to Tread. Though undeniably retaining their wit, the Wilde-isms are finally more of a distraction, imported from another world and another genre."

In the San Francisco Chronicle, Mick LaSalle opined, "There's nothing to dislike about this movie . . . Yet something is wrong with A Good Woman: The lightning never strikes. It's never quite alive . . . the process of literalizing the action, an inevitable consequence of moving a play to the screen, makes [it] less exaggerated and more somber than is ideal. But nothing can diminish the wit and the pleasure of Wilde's epigrams."

Kenneth Turan of the Los Angeles Times wrote, "The film is well-intentioned and mildly diverting, but in attempting to modernize its story it has lost many of the things that make the original so memorable and not gained much in return . . . Despite its talented cast, the result lacks Wilde's trademark bite; it's soft and middlebrow, even though he was anything but . . . Although transposing this story to photogenic Italy makes for the requisite number of scenic vistas, it also creates a number of problems for the story, starting with the fact that Wilde's concerns about the restrictive nature of society don't play as well outside the rigid confines of Victorian England. Also sacrificed in this more naturalistic production is the brilliance of Wilde's artifice. The sharpness and crackling energy of his conception, frankly, makes a bad fit with the film's fitful and not particularly successful attempts to make these characters more well-rounded . . . A Good Woman won't ruin anyone's day, but it won't make anyone's either, and it won't get the great Irish playwright anything like the admiration his work deserves."

In The Times, Wendy Ide observed, "There’s more life in Oscar Wilde’s long-dead corpse than there is in A Good Woman . . . spiked with as many pithy Wildean aphorisms as could be cannibalised from his other work and crowbarred unceremoniously into the flagging script."

Rotten Tomatoes reports a 37% approval rating based on 83 reviews with an average rating of 5.3/10 and the consensus that the film "lacks bite due to liberties taken with the source material, coupled with uneven performances." Metacritic, which uses a weighted average, assigned the film a score of 53 out of 100, based on 29 critics, indicating "mixed or average" reviews.

Hunt's performance was panned with The A.V. Club saying, "Helen Hunt looks embarrassingly out of place trying to play an infamous seductress."
