= Grand Theft Parsons =

- Theatrical poster
- Directed by: David Caffrey
- Written by: Jeremy Drysdale
- Produced by: Frank Mannion
- Starring: Johnny Knoxville; Michael Shannon; Christina Applegate
- Cinematography: Robert Hayes
- Edited by: Mary Finlay; Alan Roberts
- Music by: Richard G Mitchell
- Production companies: Frank Mannion Productions; Morty-Stevie G Productions; Helkon SK
- Distributed by: Swipe Films (United States); Redbus Film Distribution (United Kingdom)
- Release dates: 6 November 2003 (London Film Festival); 21 January 2004 (Sundance Film Festival); 19 March 2004 (United Kingdom); 18 June 2004 (United States)
- Running time: 88 minutes
- Countries: United States; United Kingdom
- Language: English

Grand Theft Parsons is a 2003 comedy-drama film based on the true story of country rock musician Gram Parsons (played by Gabriel Macht), who died of an overdose in 1973. Parsons and his road manager, Phil Kaufman (Johnny Knoxville), made a pact in life that whoever died first would be cremated by the other in what was then the Joshua Tree National Monument, an area of desert they both loved and cherished.

== Plot ==
The death of singer Gram Parsons prompts Phil Kaufman to fulfill his promise and a black comedy unwinds, with Kaufman bribing mortuary personnel, renting a psychedelic hearse from Larry Oster-Berg, and trekking across the southern California desert, pursued all the while by Parsons' ex-girlfriend with Kaufman's girlfriend and Parsons’ stepfather.

== Cast ==
- Johnny Knoxville as Phil Kaufman
- Christina Applegate as Barbara
- Michael Shannon as Larry Oster-Berg
- Marley Shelton as Susie
- Robert Forster as Stanley Parsons
- Gabriel Macht as Gram Parsons
- Robert Alan Beuth as Reporter
- Phil Kaufman as Handcuffed Felon

== Reception ==
Grand Theft Parsons was shown in the "Park City at Midnight" section at the 2004 Sundance Film Festival.

On review aggregator Rotten Tomatoes, 46% of 28 critics gave the film a positive review, with an average rating of 5.4/10, earning it a "Rotten" score. The website's critics consensus reads, "Grand Theft Parsons pays tribute to a rock legend without following biopic formula -- and proves that a unique perspective doesn't always mean a worthwhile film." On Metacritic, the film holds a weighted average score of 46 out of 100, based on 11 critics, indicating "mixed or average" reviews.

In his review for The New York Times, A. O. Scott wrote, "Parsons himself might have written a surreal, funny-sad ballad about the aftermath of his own death, but Grand Theft Parsons is little more than a surreal anecdote, told in too much detail and without enough soul or imagination to make anything more than a footnote to a legend". Kimberley Jones, in her review for the Austin Chronicle, wrote, "Black comedy can be a beautiful thing, but Grand Theft Parsons consistently misses that mark for a more bottom-feeding tasteless and broad, with the occasional ham-handed, soulless stab at sober reflection". In his review for the Los Angeles Times, Kevin Crust found Johnny Knoxville "surprisingly good" but felt that the script left "a lot to be desired, strewn with dialogue as flat and stale as old beer and some invented characters who make the events depicted seem more silly than anarchic".

However, in his review for the Sunday Times, Bryan Appleyard wrote, "Grand Theft Parsons is a delight, a comic tragedy that, though it does not say much about Parsons's art, says a great deal about the context in which it emerged". Time Out London found that the film "hit on a pleasing vein of deadpan stoner humour, especially in the character of a hearse-driving hippie who comes along for the ride" and "could easily become a cult favourite". The Daily Mirror wrote, "It's a mark of this movie's tremendous charm that, as the flames rise towards the sky, the ending seems gloriously happy".
