= Maggie Hemingway =

British novelist (1946–1993)

- Born: Margaret Joan Hemingway; 17 March 1946; Orford, Suffolk
- Died: 9 May 1993 (aged 47)
- Education: Edinburgh University
- Spouse(s): Michael Dias, David Matthews
- Children: 2 daughters: Sarah Dias-Ayton, Caroline Nocton

Maggie Hemingway (17 March 1946 – 9 May 1993) was a British novelist. She was born in Orford, Suffolk and named Margaret Joan Hemingway; but when she was three years old her family moved to New Zealand, where she spent her childhood. Returning to England in her teens, she read French and English at Edinburgh University and graduated MA in 1967.

Shortly after leaving university she married Michael Dias, with whom she had two daughters. The marriage broke up in the late 1970s and she moved to London. There she worked in publishing, eventually becoming Rights Manager for J. M. Dent. She had been writing poetry and prose from her youth, and in 1986 published her first novel, The Bridge, which won the Winifred Holtby Memorial Prize (presented for the best regional novel of the year). This story about an artist's conflict between his life and his art was made into a film in 1992.

Her following three novels all received much critical acclaim. Victoria Glendinning wrote of her second novel, Stop House Blues (1988), that "it has a classic quality which will ensure its survival". Her third, The Postman's House (1991), was based on her own experiences of Czechoslovakia before the Velvet Revolution. Eyes, her final novel (1993), is also her most experimental, combining four stories of murder into a single span and reaching a chilling conclusion. Upon its release, critics commented particularly on her descriptive powers, with the Daily Telegraph insisting that "Landscape is her forte. You can feel her weather, smell the menace in her earth."

From 1983 until her death, Maggie Hemingway's partner was the composer David Matthews, with whom she collaborated on three vocal works:

- Cantiga, op.45, for soprano and orchestra (1988);
- From Coastal Stations, op.53, for medium voice and piano (1990–91);
- Pride, for soprano, alto, tenor and string quartet (1993).

In her early 40s, Maggie Hemingway was diagnosed with aplastic anaemia. She died in London on 9 May 1993. David Matthews composed his Piano Trio No. 2, op. 61 (1993–94) in her memory.

== Books ==
- The Bridge (1986): London (Jonathan Cape), ISBN 0-224-02832-4; New York (Atheneum), ISBN 0-689-11849-X; 2 paperback editions: 1987, London (Pavanne), ISBN 0-330-29715-5, and 1991, London (Sceptre), ISBN 0-340-56533-0.
- Stop House Blues (1988): London (Hamish Hamilton), ISBN 0-241-12266-X; paperback edition: 1989, London (Penguin), ISBN 0-14-010836-X.
- The Postmen's House (1990), London (Sinclair-Stevenson), ISBN 1-85619-009-9; paperback edition: 1992, London (Sceptre), ISBN 0-340-57118-7.
- Eyes (1993), London (Sinclair-Stevenson), ISBN 1-85619-327-6; paperback edition: 1994, London (Sceptre), ISBN 0-340-59913-8.

== Short Story ==
'Mostly Southend', in Storia 3: Consequences; Pandora Press, 1989, ISBN 0-04-440451-4.

== Essay ==
'Look Behind You...', in Violetta and Her Sisters: "The Lady of the Camellias" – Responses to the Myth, ed. Nicholas John (1994); London (Faber and Faber), ISBN 0-571-16665-2
