= Whisky Bar =

Whisky Bar or Whiskey Bar can refer to

- Whisky Bar, a bar in the Sunset Marquis Hotel
- Whisky a Go Go, a bar in California sometimes referred to as "The Whisky"
- "Alabama Song (Whisky Bar)", a song notably covered by The Doors and David Bowie
- Whiskey Bar, a weblog by Billmon
