= Capsule hotel =

Japanese hotels with small bed-sized rooms

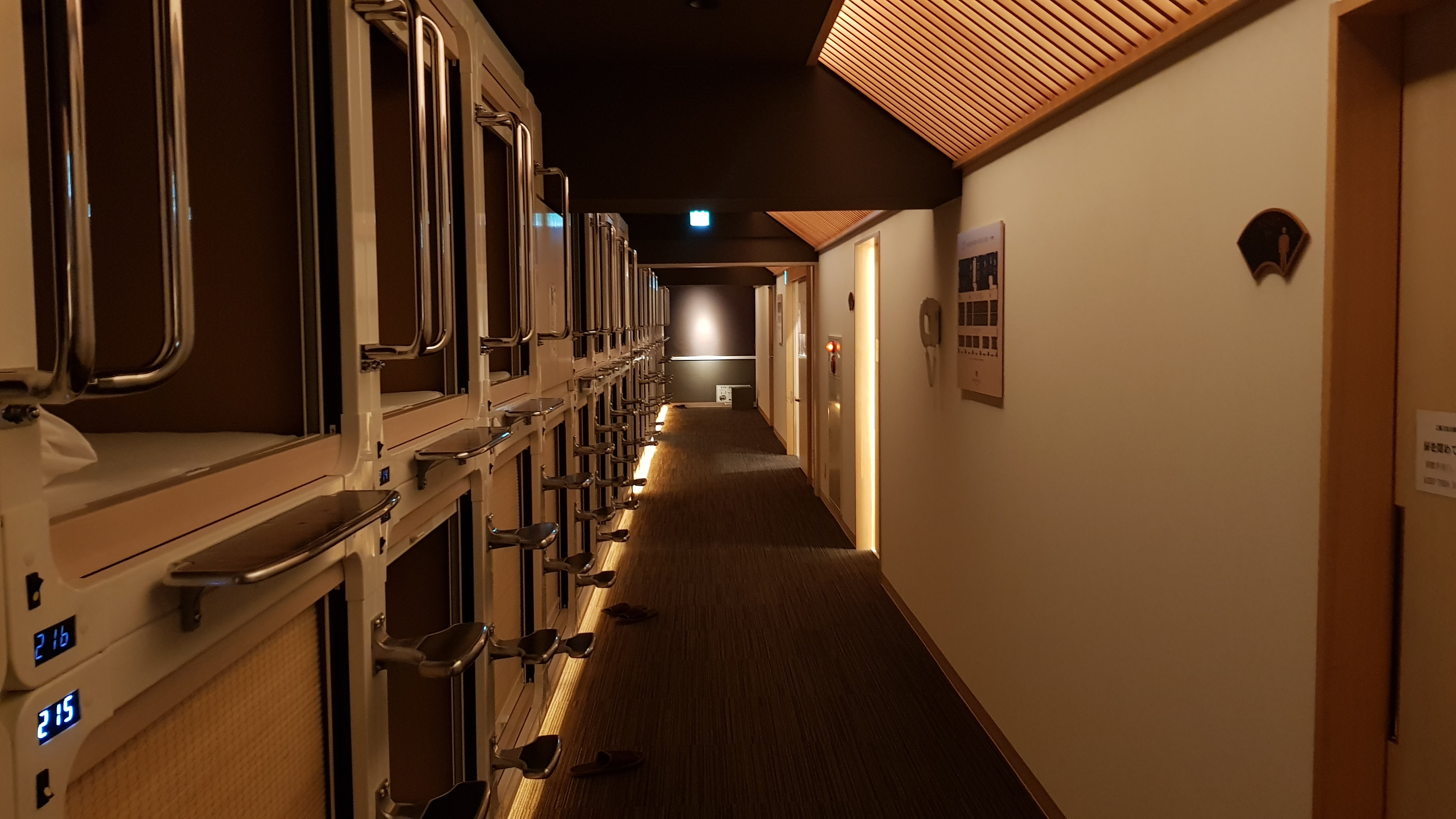
Capsules in Tokyo

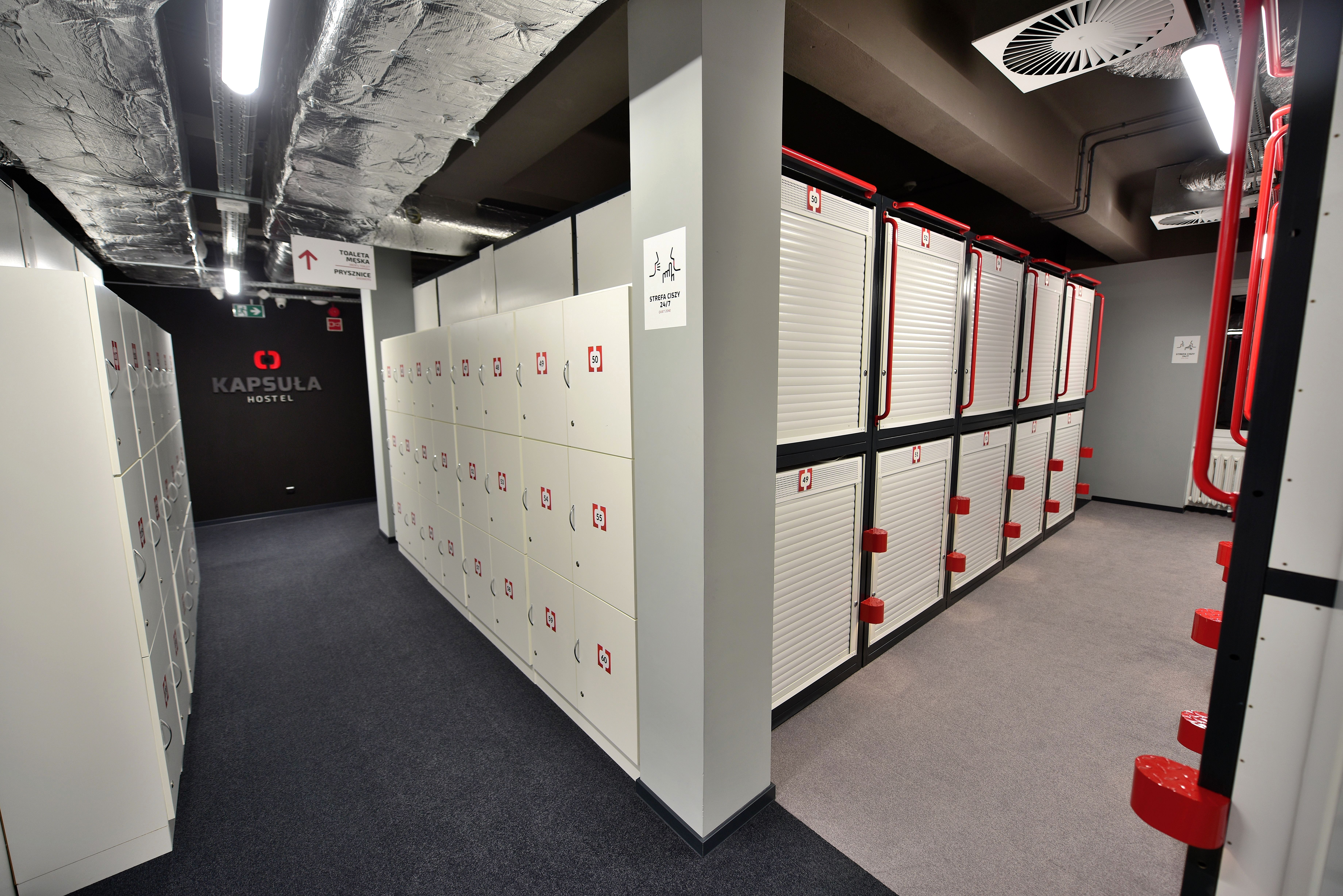
Capsule hotel in Warsaw, Poland. The lockers are on the left of the image, while the sleeping capsules are on the right.

A capsule hotel (Japanese: カプセルホテル, romanized: kapuseru hoteru), also known in the Anglosphere as a pod hotel, is a type of hotel developed in Japan that features many small, bed-sized rooms known as capsules. Capsule hotels provide cheap, basic overnight accommodation for guests who do not require or who cannot afford the larger, more expensive rooms offered by more conventional hotels.

The guest room is a chamber roughly the length and width of a single bed, with sufficient height for a hotel guest to crawl in and sit up on the bed. The chamber walls may be made of wood, metal or any rigid material, but are often fibreglass or plastic. Amenities within the room generally include a small television, air conditioning, an electronic console, and power sockets. The capsules are stacked side-by-side, two units high, with steps or ladders providing access to the second-level rooms, similar to bunk beds. The open end of the capsule can be closed with a curtain or a solid door for privacy, and can be locked from the inside only.

Capsule hotels vary in size, from 50 or so capsules to 700, and primarily cater to men. Some capsule hotels offer separate sections for male and female guests, or even separate floors and elevators.

== History ==
The first capsule hotel in the world was the Capsule Inn Osaka, which opened in 1979, located in the Umeda district of Osaka, Japan and designed by Kisho Kurokawa. The concept was conceived by Yukio Nakano, a sauna operator in Osaka, who wanted to offer customers who had missed the last train somewhere proper to sleep rather than on the sauna floor. He commissioned Kurokawa specifically because he had seen his Residential Capsule exhibit at the 1970 Osaka World Expo. From there, it spread to other cities within Japan. Since then, the concept has further spread to various other territories, including Belgium, Canada, China, Hong Kong, Iceland, India, Indonesia, Israel, Poland, Saudi Arabia, and South Korea.

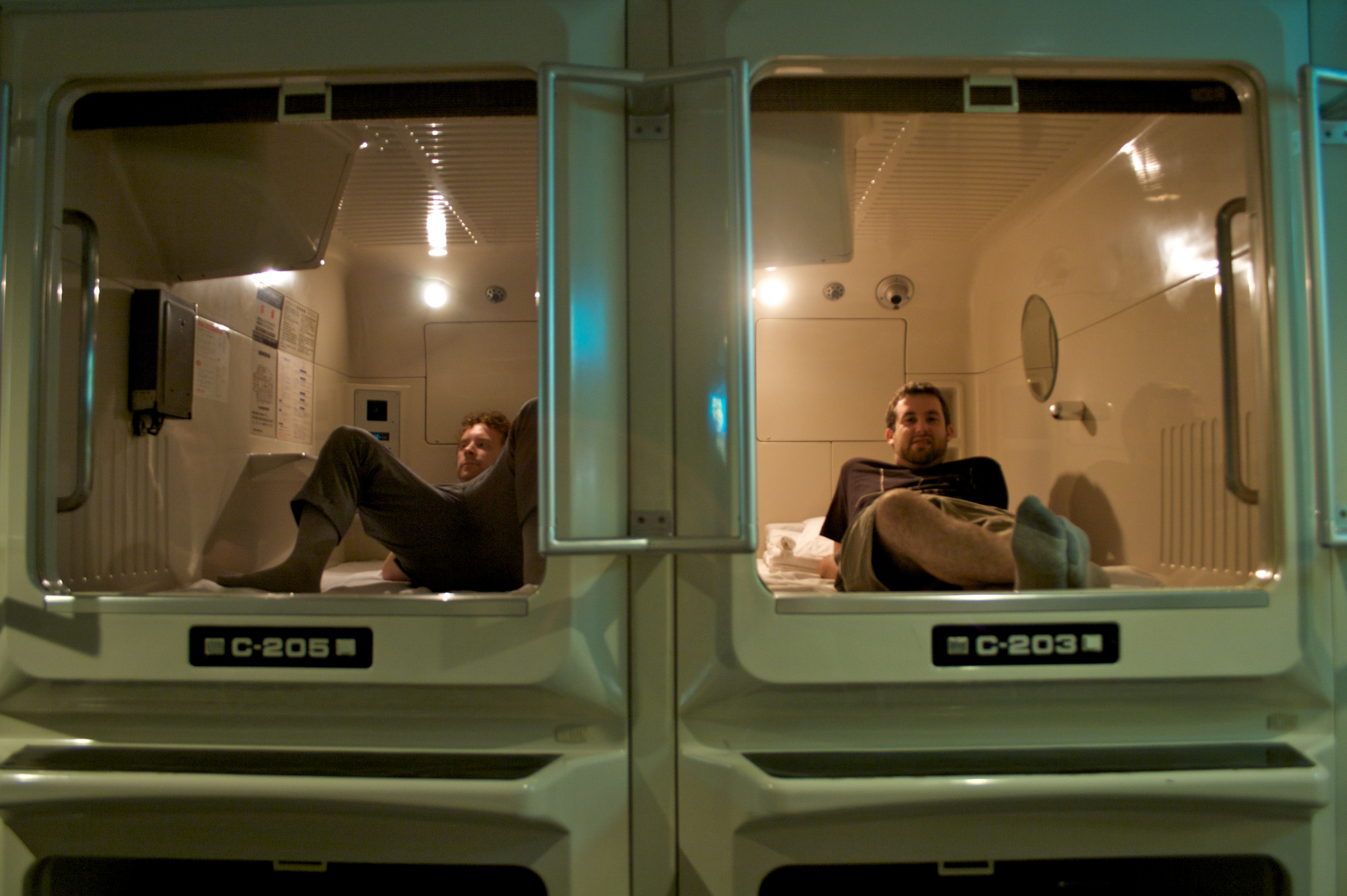
Guests in their beds at the Asahi Plaza capsule hotel

== Business strategy ==
GlobalData travel and tourism analyst Laura Beaton compares the strategy behind capsule hotels "to how companies like Ryanair and easyJet have mastered unbundling flight services", as hotel firms are “stripping down a service in order to offer the lowest price possible”. Capsule hotels are appealing to the hotel industry, as they are an "efficient use of space especially in key gateway cities where real estate is very expensive".

== Amenities ==
Like a hostel, many amenities are communally shared, including toilets, showers, wireless internet, and dining rooms. In Japan, a capsule hotel may have a communal bath and sauna. Some hotels also provide restaurants, snack bars, bars, or vending machines, pools, and other entertainment facilities. There may be a lounge with upholstered chairs for relaxing, along with newspapers and reading material. Clothes and shoes are exchanged for a yukata and slippers on entry, and a towel and bathrobe may also be provided. Luggage and valuables are usually stored in lockers or—if available—in-room safes. Guests are asked not to smoke or eat in the capsules.

== Types ==
=== Lower cost ===
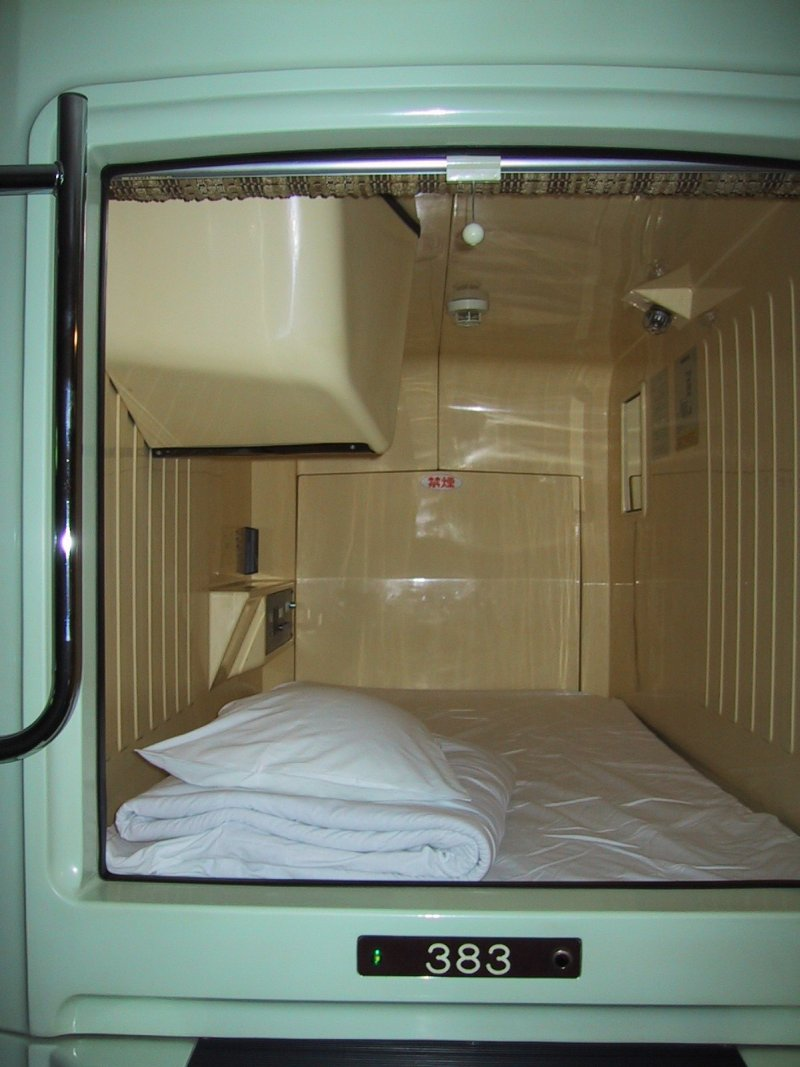
In this Osaka capsule hotel, the box in the upper left foreground is the TV, which is controlled via the panel in the left background. This panel also controls the light and the air conditioning. On the right wall is a mirror and the air conditioning inlet in the top corner.

The lowest-cost pod hotels consist of only a “bunk bed with a privacy curtain in a multi-bed dormitory and facilities shared with other guests.” The benefits of these hotels are their convenience and low price, usually around ¥2000–4000 (USD 13–25) a night.

In Japan, capsule hotels have been stereotypically used by Japanese salarymen who may be too drunk to return home safely, have missed the last train of the day to make a return trip home due to working late hours, or are too embarrassed to face their spouses. During the Great Recession, some unemployed or underemployed workers who had become homeless during the crisis temporarily rented capsules by the month. As of 2010, these customers made up 30% of visitors at the Capsule Hotel Shinjuku 510 in Tokyo.

The “backpacker market” is also important in the capsule hotel market, as not all backpackers like the low-privacy hostel experience, which involves “sharing a dormitory with 11 or more strangers…”

=== Luxury versions ===
Boutique capsule hotels are higher-priced versions which add “luxury to a traditionally no-frills market” such as “fancy decor or promises of fluffy duck-feather duvets.” CNN's Johan Nylander states that in 2018, a “new kind of stylish capsule hotel is popping up across [Japan]” which “blend[s]...function and style” to “attract both local business people and foreign hipsters in search of fashionable accommodation.” Nylander's examples of luxury pods include First Cabin Tsukiji, which has an “airport business class lounge”-style bar and larger pods you can stand up in; Tokyo’s Women Centurion Cabin & Spa, which has pods with “a TV, [electronic] tablets, humidifier and aroma diffuser” and a sauna and hot tubs as shared amenities; and Spa & Capsule Hotel Grandpark Inn Kitasenju in Tokyo, which adds a “whiskey bar, business center and “onsen” sauna area” to its pods.

=== Novelty types ===
There are a small number of novelty capsule hotels including, among others, bookstore capsules and outdoor adventure-type capsules.

Book and Bed is a novelty Tokyo capsule hotel which offers book lovers the opportunity to sleep amid bookshelves. The hotel, designed by architect Makoto Tanijiri, has a “wall of bookcases made from plywood, complete with lanterns, metal ladders, and 12 openings leading to 'bookshelf beds' in which guests can sleep” with the shelves including a selection of Japanese- and English-language “novels, design [books] and photography books.”

The Ovo Patagonia hotel in Argentina provides polycarbonate sleeping capsules suspended 270 metres above the ground with a view of nearby mountains. Guests put on safety gear and hike up to the capsules with a mountain guide, who also climbs to the capsule to provide room service, including meals.

== See also ==
- Sleepbox
- Nap pod
- Transit hotel
- Bedspace apartment
- Shipping container architecture
- Flophouse
- Four penny coffin
- Nakagin Capsule Tower
