= University of Alabama (disambiguation) =

University of Alabama is a public research university in Tuscaloosa, Alabama part of University of Alabama System.

University of Alabama may also refer to:

- University of Alabama at Birmingham
- University of Alabama in Huntsville

== See also ==
- 2010 University of Alabama in Huntsville shooting
