= Alabama (Julia Tutwiler song) =

Regional anthem of Alabama

- Regional anthem of Alabama
- Lyrics: Julia Tutwiler
- Music: Edna Gockel Gussen, 1931
- Published: 1931
- Adopted: March 9, 1931; 95 years ago

"Alabama" is the regional anthem of the U.S. state of Alabama; it was adopted as the official state song in 1931.

== History ==
"Alabama" was written as a poem by Julia Tutwiler, a distinguished educator and humanitarian. It was first sung to an Austrian air, but in 1931, the music written by Edna Gockel Gussen, an organist, and choirmaster from Birmingham, Alabama, was adopted by the State Federation of Music Clubs and through their efforts, House Joint Resolution 74 was adopted March 9, 1931. Act no. 126, adopted the music and words as the state song of Alabama. The bill was introduced by the Hon. Tyler Goodwyn, Montgomery, and was signed into law by Governor B. M. Miller.

The inspiration for writing the poem Alabama came to Julia Tutwiler after she returned to her native state from Germany, where she had been studying new educational methods for girls and women. She recalled that in Germany patriotism was inspired by spirited songs. She thought that it would be helpful toward restoring the spirits of her own people to give them a new patriotic song, inspiring her to write "Alabama."

== Lyrics ==
Alabama, Alabama, We will aye be true to thee,
From thy Southern shores where groweth,
By the sea thine orange tree.
To thy Northern vale where floweth,
Deep and blue the Tennessee,
Alabama, Alabama, We will aye be true to thee!

Broad thy stream whose name thou bearest;
Grand thy Bigbee rolls along;
Fair thy Coosa-Tallapoosa
Bold thy Warrior, dark and strong,
Goodlier than the land that Moses
Climbed lone Nebo's Mount to see,
Alabama, Alabama, we will aye be true to thee!

From thy prairies, broad and fertile,
Where thy snow-white cotton shines.
To the hills where coal and iron,
Hide in thy exhaustless mines,
Strong-armed miners -sturdy farmers;
Loyal hearts what'er we be,
Alabama, Alabama, we will aye be true to thee!

From thy quarries where the marble
White as that of Paros gleams
Waiting till thy sculptor's chisel,
Wake to life thy poet's dreams;
Fear not only wealth of nature,
Wealth of mind hast thou no fee,
Alabama, Alabama, we will aye be true to thee!

Where the perfumed south-wind whispers,
Thy magnolia groves among,
Softer than a mother's kisses,
Sweeter than a mother's song,
Where the golden jasmine trailing,
Woos the treasure-laden bee,
Alabama, Alabama, we will aye be true to thee!

Brave and pure thy men and women,
Better this than corn and wine
Make us worthy, God in Heaven
Of this goodly land of Thine.
Hearts as open as thy doorways.
Liberal hands and spirits free.
Alabama, Alabama, we will aye be true to thee!

Little, little can I give thee,
Alabama, mother mine.
But that little - hand, brain, spirit.
All I have and am are thine.
Take, O take, the gift and giver.
Take and serve thyself with me.
Alabama, Alabama, we will aye be true to thee!
