= USS Alabama =

At least seven United States Navy ships have been named Alabama, after the southern state of Alabama.

- USS Alabama (1819), a 74-gun ship of the line, laid down in 1819, though never completed as such. She was eventually launched in 1864 as the storeship USS New Hampshire.
- USS Alabama (1838), a sidewheel steamer transferred to the Navy in 1849 that served as a troop transport during the Mexican–American War.
- USS Alabama (1850), a sidewheel steamer merchant vessel that was commissioned in 1861 during the American Civil War.
- USS Alabama (BB-8), a pre-dreadnought battleship commissioned in 1900 and scrapped in 1924.
- USS Alabama (SP-1052), a 69-foot motor boat inspected by the Navy in the summer of 1917 and assigned the designation SP-1052.
- USS Alabama (BB-60), a South Dakota-class battleship commissioned in 1942, converted to a museum ship in 1964 and now docked in Mobile, Alabama.
- USS Alabama (SSBN-731), an Ohio-class submarine currently in service.

== See also ==
- USS Alabama was the French title for the film Crimson Tide, which was set on the eponymous submarine.

== See also ==
- CSS Alabama
- SS Alabama
- MV Maersk Alabama, the merchant ship involved in a 2009 piracy incident
