= Nathan Wilson =

Nathan Wilson may refer to:

- Nathan Wilson (politician) (1758–1834), American politician
- N. D. Wilson (born 1978), American author
- Nathan Wilson (footballer) (born 1993), Australian rules footballer from Western Australia
- Nathan Wilson (cinematographer) for The Trouble with Romance
- Nathan Wilson (cyclist) in 2013 USA Pro Cycling Challenge

== See also ==
- Nathaniel Wilson (disambiguation)
