= Billmon =

- Occupation: Blogger
- Known for: Published material critical of the US Invasion of Iraq on his blog called Whiskey Bar

Billmon was the pseudonym of an allegedly American blogger, who provided his own analysis and commentary on political topics, and who was mainly active in the early 2000s when he published material critical of the US Invasion of Iraq. His blog was called Whiskey Bar.

== Career as a blogger ==
Billmon was one of the earliest participants at DailyKos. His own blog, Whiskey Bar, came into being in the aftermath of the American invasion of Iraq in the spring of 2003. The actual name of the blog Whiskey Bar is taken from a line from Bertolt Brecht's "Alabama Song," quoted at the top of the blog.

He wrote extended pieces on domestic politics, the Iraq war, and the US economy.

At the end of June 2004 Billmon announced that he would be closing them down.

Billmon continued posting his analysis and comments, with some periods of inactivity, over the following two and a half years.

On December 28, 2006, Billmon stopped blogging at The Whiskey Bar, and the URL www.billmon.org became unavailable. In late April 2007, a more or less complete copy of Whiskey Bar re-surfaced, but was down again by October 2007. On July 31, 2008, Billmon returned to Daily Kos to post a diary entry in regard to John McCain's presidential campaign entitled "The Great White Hope," and posted sporadically on DailyKos afterward, also maintaining a Twitter account, which was deactivated at the end of 2016.
