= Alabam =

Alabam may refer to:

- Alabama, a U.S. state
- Alabam, Arkansas, an unincorporated community
- "Alabam" (song), a song by Cowboy Copas
- Old Alabam, Arkansas, an unincorporated community
