= Alabama Hollow =

- Valley

Dimensions
  - Length: ~2.9 miles (4.7 km)
- Elevation: 15 m (50 ft)
- Topo map: Holley, Ward Basin

Alabama Hollow is a shallow valley on Eglin Air Force Base near Navarre, Florida. It has an elevation of approximately 50 feet at its floor and 80 feet on either side of the hollow.
