= Shenandoah (schooner) =

Topsail schooner built 1964

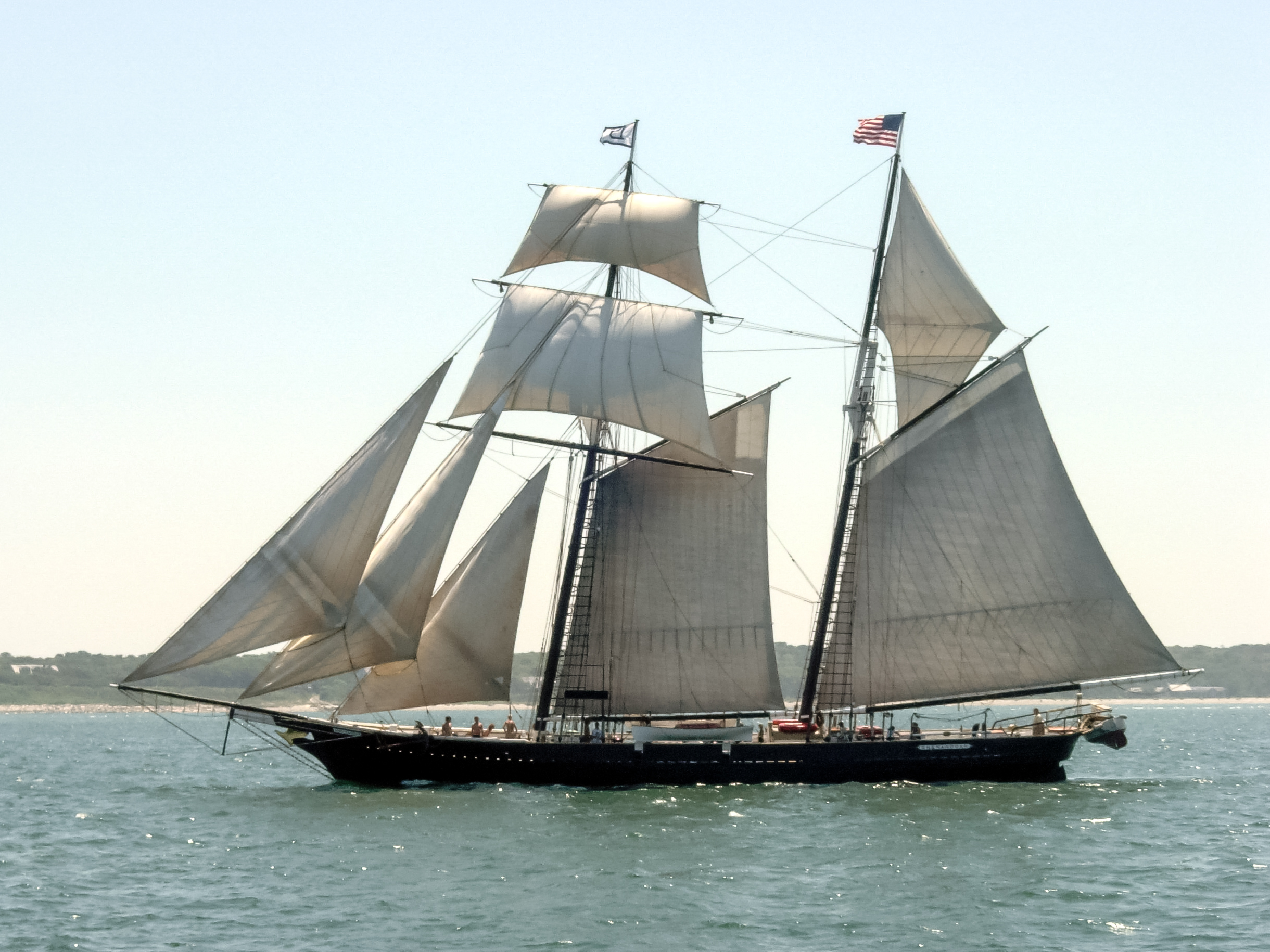
- Topsail schooner Shenandoah on Nantucket Sound.

History

United States
- Name: Shenandoah
- Owner: Martha's Vineyard Ocean Academy nonprofit organization as of 2020
- Builder: Harvey F. Gamage Ship Building Co
- Completed: 1964

General characteristics
- Displacement: 170 tons
- Length: 108 feet
- Height: 94 feet
- Installed power: Sail
- Sail plan: Topsail Schooner
- Speed: 12.5 knots
- Capacity: 30 Passengers
- Crew: 10

The Shenandoah is a 108-foot (33 m) topsail schooner built in Maine in 1964, and operates as a cruise ship and educational vessel in the waters of Vineyard Haven Harbor, Martha's Vineyard, Massachusetts. She is claimed to be the only schooner of her size and topsail rig without an engine in the world.

== History ==
The Shenandoah's design is based on an 1850s ship Joe Lane, but Captain Robert S. Douglas made numerous changes to improve the power of the vessel. Douglas was the vessel's only skipper since her launch in 1964, until Shenandoah was donated to the nonprofit organization FUEL in 2020. She is now captained by Ian Ridgeway.

The Shenandoah required extensive hull repairs and was dry docked in 2009.

== General characteristics ==
Type: Topsail schooner

Designed by: Captain Robert S. Douglas

Built by: Harvey F. Gamage Ship Building Co.

Length (overall): 108 feet (33 m)

Sparred length: 154 feet (47 m) (from jib boom to main boom end)

Sails: 7,000 square feet (700 m^{2}) of canvas

Topmast height: 94 feet (29 m)

Displacement: 170 tons (173 t)

Hull: made of Maine oak

Deck: made of pine

Lower masts: 20 inches diameter, 2.5 tons each

Maximum speed: 12.5 knots (23 km/h)

Maximum capacity: 30 passengers overnight

A range of one to four berths can be found in the 11 cabins below deck. It houses seven crew members, a first-mate, a cook, and the captain. The ship contains two heads, a main saloon, and a galley.

== Shenandoah gallery ==
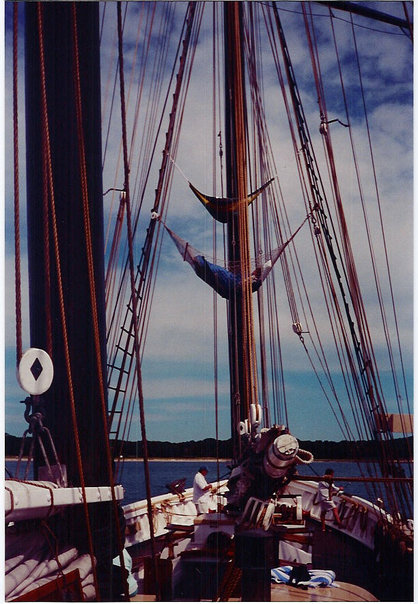
The crew sleeping in hammocks

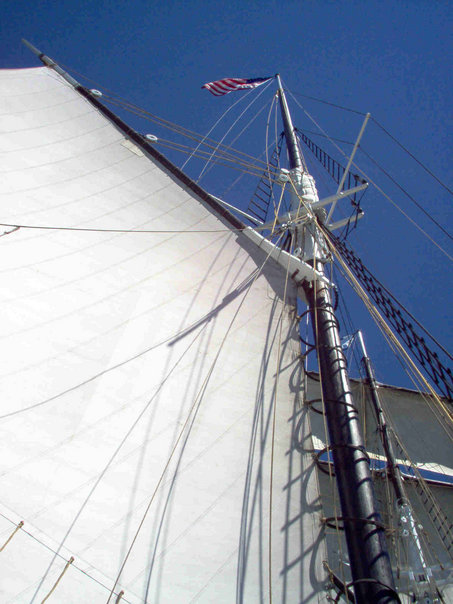
Shenandoah's sails

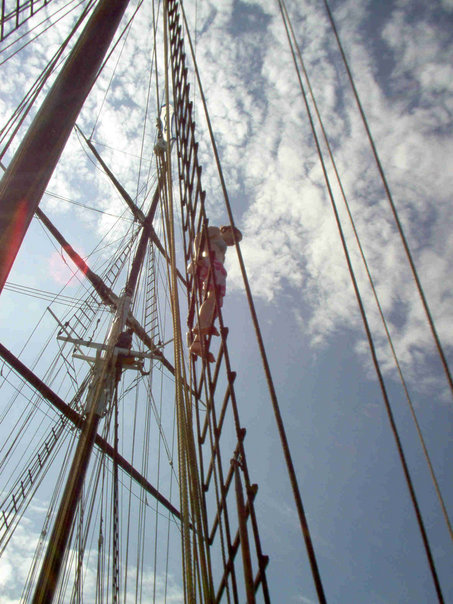
Aloft in the rigging

== See also ==
- Alabama schooner
- List of schooners
