= Alabama Hill =

Alabama Hill may refer to:

- Alabama Hills, California
- Alabama Hills in the Sierra Nevada
- Alabama Hill, Queensland
