= Alabama (schooner) =

History

United States
- Name: Alabama
- Owner: The Black Dog Tall Ships
- Operator: Captain Jamie Douglas
- Route: Southwestern New England, Vineyard Sound
- Completed: 1926
- Identification: MMSI number: 367315780; Callsign: WDD9744
- Status: Active

General characteristics
- Class & type: A
- Tonnage: 70 gross, 35 net
- Displacement: 150 tons
- Length: 90 ft (27 m)
- Beam: 21 ft (6.4 m)
- Height: 94 ft (29 m)
- Draft: 12 ft 6 in (3.81 m)
- Decks: Yellow Pine
- Installed power: Two Detroit 6-71 diesel engines
- Propulsion: Auxiliary sail
- Sail plan: Gaff Rigged Fore and Aft Schooner
- Speed: 11.5 knots (21.3 km/h).
- Capacity: 49 day, 27 overnight
- Crew: 5

Alabama is a Gloucester (Massachusetts) fishing schooner that was built in 1926 and was the pilot boat for Mobile, Alabama. The Alabama's home port is Vineyard Haven, Martha's Vineyard, Massachusetts. It is owned by The Black Dog Tall Ships, along with the Shenandoah, and offers cruises of Nantucket Sound.

== History ==
The schooner Alabama was one of the last vessels built from the design of one of the most notable designers of Gloucester fishing schooners, Thomas F. McManus. Commissioned by the Mobile Bar Pilot Association of Mobile, Alabama, the vessel was built in Pensacola, Florida, launched in 1926, and originally called Alabamian until her predecessor, the Bar Pilot Association's original Alabama, was retired. Though the hull bore a strong resemblance to McManus' famous Gloucester fishing schooner designs, it as a pilot boat stationed on the Mobile Bar until 1966.

In 1967, the schooner was bought by Captain Robert S. Douglas, master and designer of the Shenandoah, and moved to Vineyard Haven where she sat on a mooring with minimal necessary upkeep until 1994. In the early 1990s, with a dwindling market for windjammer cruises, which lack most modern amenities, children became the new direction for the Coastwise Packet Company, the original name of what is now also the Black Dog Tall Ships. Because of the success of these "kids' cruises" on board the Shenandoah, Alabama was rebuilt by the Five Corners Shipbuilding Company headed by Gary Maynard, a former first mate who sailed on the Shenandoah. Most of the work was done in Vineyard Haven with the vessel afloat on her mooring using Captain Douglas' own power tools and shop space. Any other work was done in Fairhaven, Massachusetts, at D.N. Kelly's shipyard.

The Alabama now flies the Douglas house flag and the Black Dog emblem from her rig. As an ambassador for the Black Dog, as well as a platform for youngsters to experience life at sea, the vessel can be seen cruising the waters of southern New England during the summer and making occasional visits to towns with a maritime heritage in the shoulder season.

A Coast Guard boat crew safely transferred 17 passengers from the grounded Alabama near the mouth of the Mystic River, Connecticut, on Sunday evening, June 18, 2017. Around 6:15 pm, watchstanders at Coast Guard Sector Long Island Sound Command Center were notified that the 126-foot schooner, with 17 passengers and five crew aboard, had run aground near the mouth of the river. Sector Long Island Sound watchstanders launched a Coast Guard boat crew from Coast Guard Station New London and issued a safety marine information broadcast. The station boat crew arrived on scene and safely transferred the 17 passengers from the Alabama to Noank shipyard in Groton, Connecticut. Sector Long Island Sound marine investigators were scheduled to conduct an investigation to ensure the integrity of the vessel prior to the vessel operating again.

The Alabama was a regular participant in the annual Gloucester Schooner Festival.

== In popular culture ==
The Alabama played the seal-hunting schooner Ghost in the 2009 German miniseries Sea Wolf.

A season-seven episode of ZOOM took place on the schooner.

== See also ==
- List of schooners
