= Mike Barker (director) =

British film director

- Born: Mike Barker; 29 November 1965 (age 60); England, United Kingdom
- Occupation: Director

Mike Barker (born 29 November 1965) is a British film director. His 2003 film To Kill a King was entered into the 25th Moscow International Film Festival.

== Filmography ==
- The Testaments (2026)
- Malice (2025)
- The Sandman (2022)
- Luckiest Girl Alive (2022)
- Hit & Run (TV series) (2021)
- The Handmaid's Tale TV series, seasons 1–5 (2017–22)
- Fargo TV series, season 3 (2017)
- Versailles TV series (2017)
- The Tunnel TV series (2016)
- Broadchurch TV series (2015)
- Outlander TV series, seasons 1–2 (2014–16)
- Rogue TV series (2014)
- The Smoke TV series (2014)
- Silent Witness TV series (2013)
- Moby Dick TV miniseries (2011)
- Sea Wolf TV miniseries (2009)
- Butterfly on a Wheel (2007)
- A Good Woman (2004)
- To Kill a King (2003)
- Lorna Doone TV mini series (2000)
- Best Laid Plans (1999)
- The James Gang (1997)
- The Tenant of Wildfell Hall TV miniseries (1996)
- Silent Witness TV series (1996)
