= Tony Carr (drummer) =

Maltese-British drummer (1927–2026)

- Born: George Caruana; 24 October 1927; Valletta, Crown Colony of Malta
- Died: 2 January 2026 (aged 98) London, England
- Genres: Jazz; rock
- Instruments: Drums; percussion

George Caruana (24 October 1927 – 2 January 2026), known professionally as Tony Carr, was a Maltese drummer and percussionist who was initially active in jazz and then predominantly in rock music.

== Career ==
Carr began his career in Malta, where he formed an early jazz trio with Frank 'Bibi' Camilleri and Joe Curmi (il-Puse), and later joined Jimmy Dowling’s band. In 1952, he emigrated to the United Kingdom to pursue a career in the music industry. Having been spotted in Malta by the British musician and music manager Tito Burns before he left, Carr auditioned that year in London, but his breakthrough came in 1954 when he joined the renowned American jazz pop singer and bandleader Billy Eckstine for a European tour. In 1957, he was in the studio with the ensemble of the show Share My Lettuce. In the 1960s, he first joined Bill Le Sage's trio, with whom he recorded the album Directions in Jazz in 1964. He then recorded Like Someone In Love with Danny Moss. In 1966, he also accompanied Hoagy Carmichael, with whom he also performed in Hamburg, Germany. He also performed with Cleo Laine at the Prague Jazz Festival, where recordings were made.

In the realm of pop music, Carr first gained recognition as a member of Donovan's band, with whom he initially recorded the single Sunshine Superman (1966) and the album For Little Ones (1967), before subsequently making several more albums with him. During this time, he also played in the groups of Ronnie Ross and Harold McNair. Later, he worked with Alexis Korner and the CCS, and as a studio musician with John Schroeder, Tim Hardin, Alan Price, Kevin Ayers, Al Stewart, Magna Carta, the Strawbs (Nomadness), and glam rocker Alvin Stardust. He was also briefly a member of the Family Dogg. In 1979, he played with Paul McCartney and Wings and participated in the Concert for Kampuchea. The following year, he worked with Roger Daltrey.

Later, Carr occasionally worked in the studio with Al Stewart and Alan Price and also contributed to Cliff Richard's compilation albums The Platinum Collection (2005) and 75 at 75 (2015).

== Personal life and death ==
Carr died in London, England on 2 January 2026, at the age of 98.
