= The Best Band in the Land =

Studio album by CCS
- Released: September 1973
- Recorded: January – May 1973
- Studio: Abbey Road Studios, London
- Genre: Blues, Jazz, Rock
- Length: 34:52
- Label: RAK
- Producer: Mickie Most

CCS chronology
C.C.S. (1972)	The Best Band in the Land (1973)

Singles from The Best Band in the Land
- 1. "The Band Played The Boogie" Released: 29 June 1973 (UK) September 1973 (US)

Professional ratings
Review scores
Source	Rating
AllMusic	2.5/5 stars

The Best Band in the Land is the third and final studio album of CCS. It was recorded at Abbey Road Studios in London, January to May 1973 and released in September that year. In Australia, the album was titled The Band Played the Boogie.

The album includes covers of songs by The Kinks and Cream amongst others, and it is equally split with original compositions. The style continues that of their previous two albums, with heavy rock and blues songs arranged with jazz instruments. The single "The Band Played the Boogie" charted as high as number 36 on the UK Official Charts. Neither the album or single charted in the US.

== Track listing ==
=== Side one ===
1. "The Band Played the Boogie" (Don Reedman, Jeff Jarrett, John Cameron) – 3:49
2. "Wild Witch Lady" (Donovan Leitch) – 4:00
3. "Lola" (Ray Davies) – 3:35
4. "Primitive Love" (Mike Chapman, Nicky Chinn) – 3:15
5. "Hundred Highways" (Cameron) – 3:49

=== Side two ===
1. "Shakin' All Over" (Frederick Heath) – 3:08
2. "Memphis" (Cameron) – 3:40
3. "Sunshine of Your Love" (Jack Bruce, Pete Brown, Eric Clapton) – 3:39
4. "Our Man in London" (Cameron) – 2:22
5. "Cannibal Sheep" (Alexis Korner) – 3:35

== Personnel ==
=== Musicians ===
- Alexis Korner – vocals
- Peter Thorup – vocals
- John Cameron – electric piano, conductor
- Alan Parker – electric guitar
- Herbie Flowers – bass
- Spike Heatley – string bass
- Tony Carr, Barry Morgan – drums
- Jim Lawless, Bill Le Sage – percussion
- Harold Beckett, Henry Lowther, Greg Bowen, Tony Fisher, Les Condon, Kenny Wheeler – trumpet
- Don Lusher, John Marshall, Brain Perrin, Bill Geldard – trombone
- Neil Sanders – horn
- Harold McNair, Tony Coe, Pete King, Danny Moss, Bob Efford, Ron Ross – saxophones, woodwinds

=== Technical ===
- Mickie Most – producer
- Mike Bobak, Guy Bidmead – engineers
