= List of UK top-ten singles in 1971 =

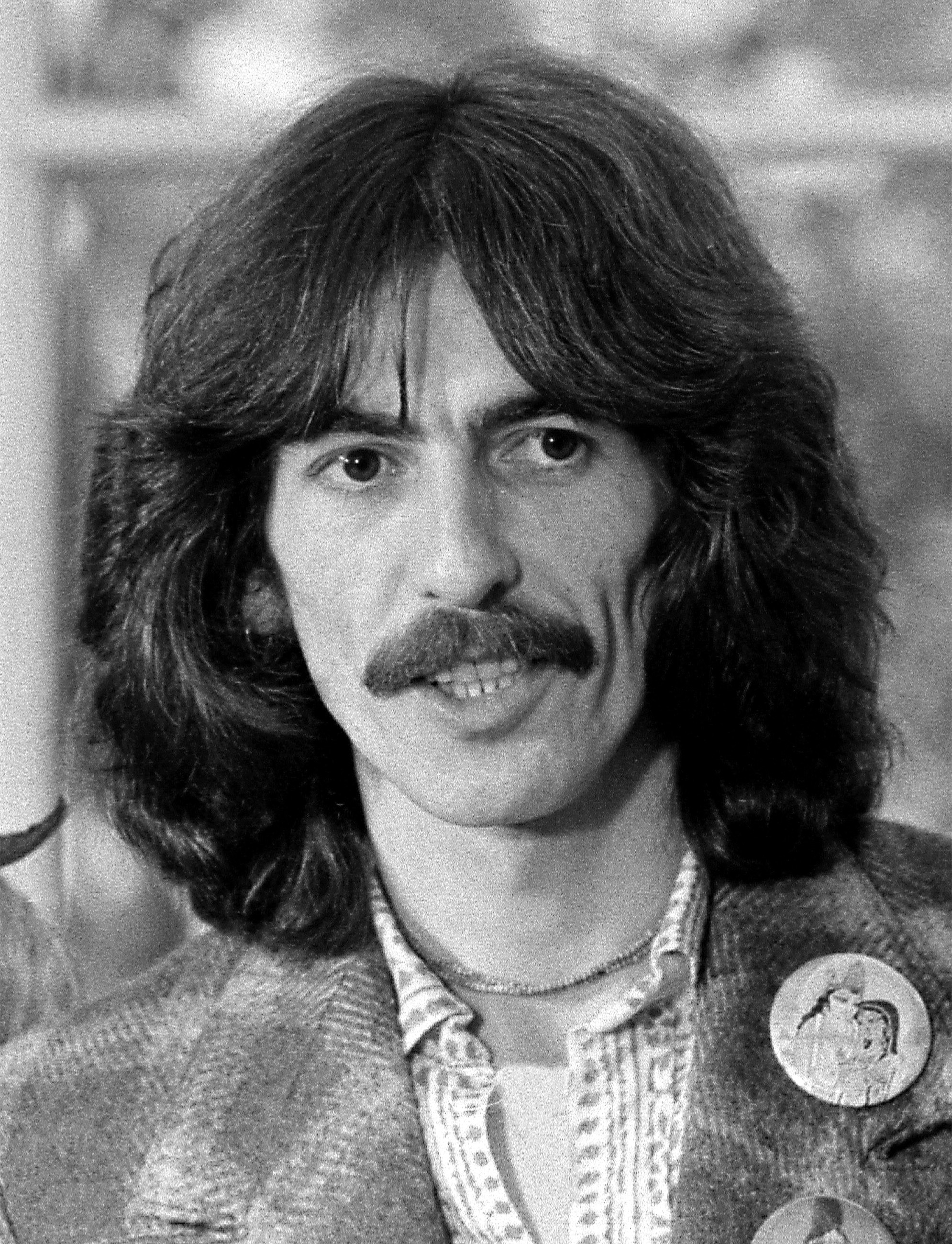
George Harrison had the best-selling single of 1971 with "My Sweet Lord", which spent five weeks at number-one. He also reached number ten with "Bangla Desh".

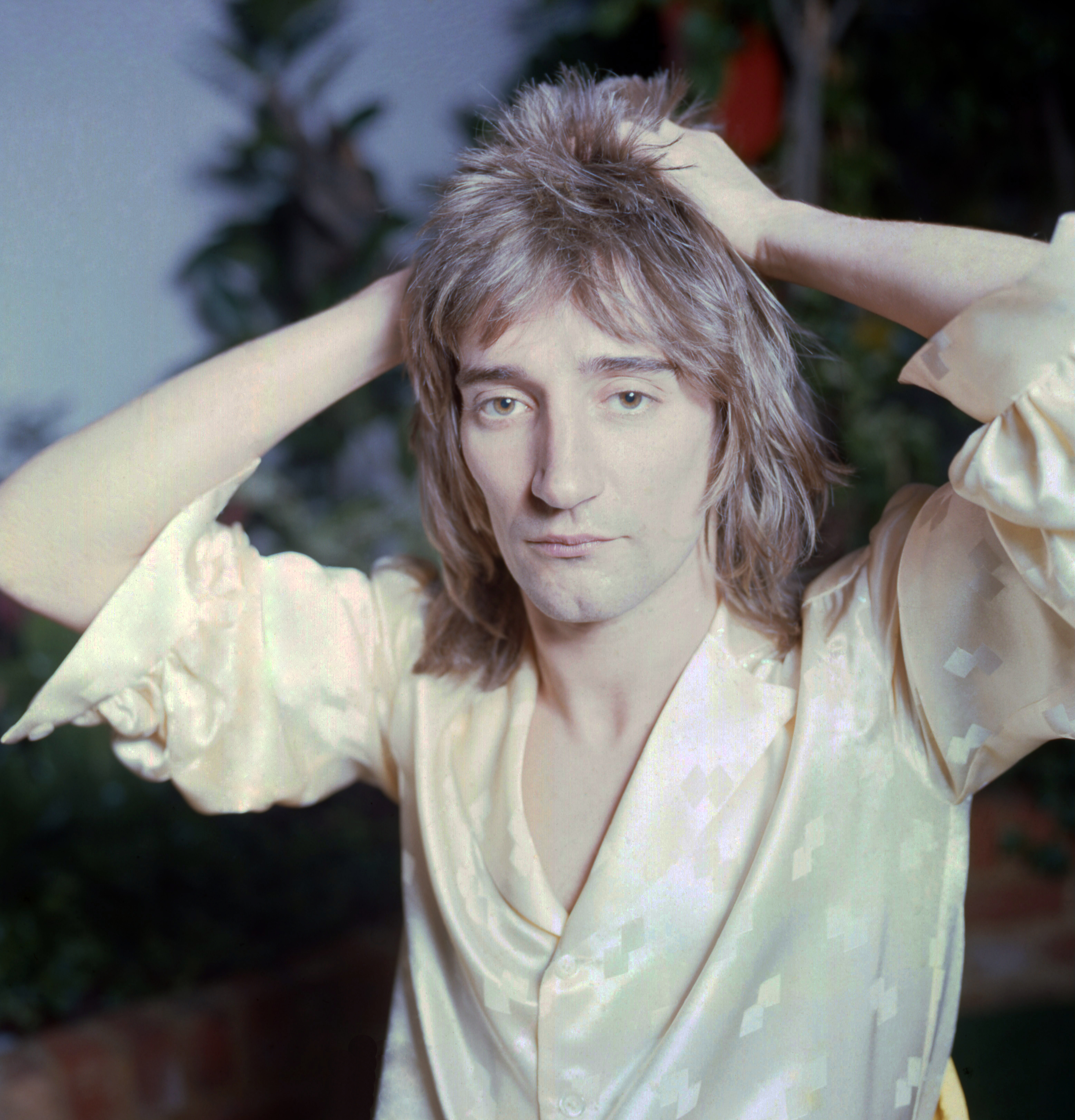
Rod Stewart made his chart debut this year with "Maggie May"/"Reason to Believe", which reached number-one in October, stayed there for five weeks, and became the second best selling single of the year.

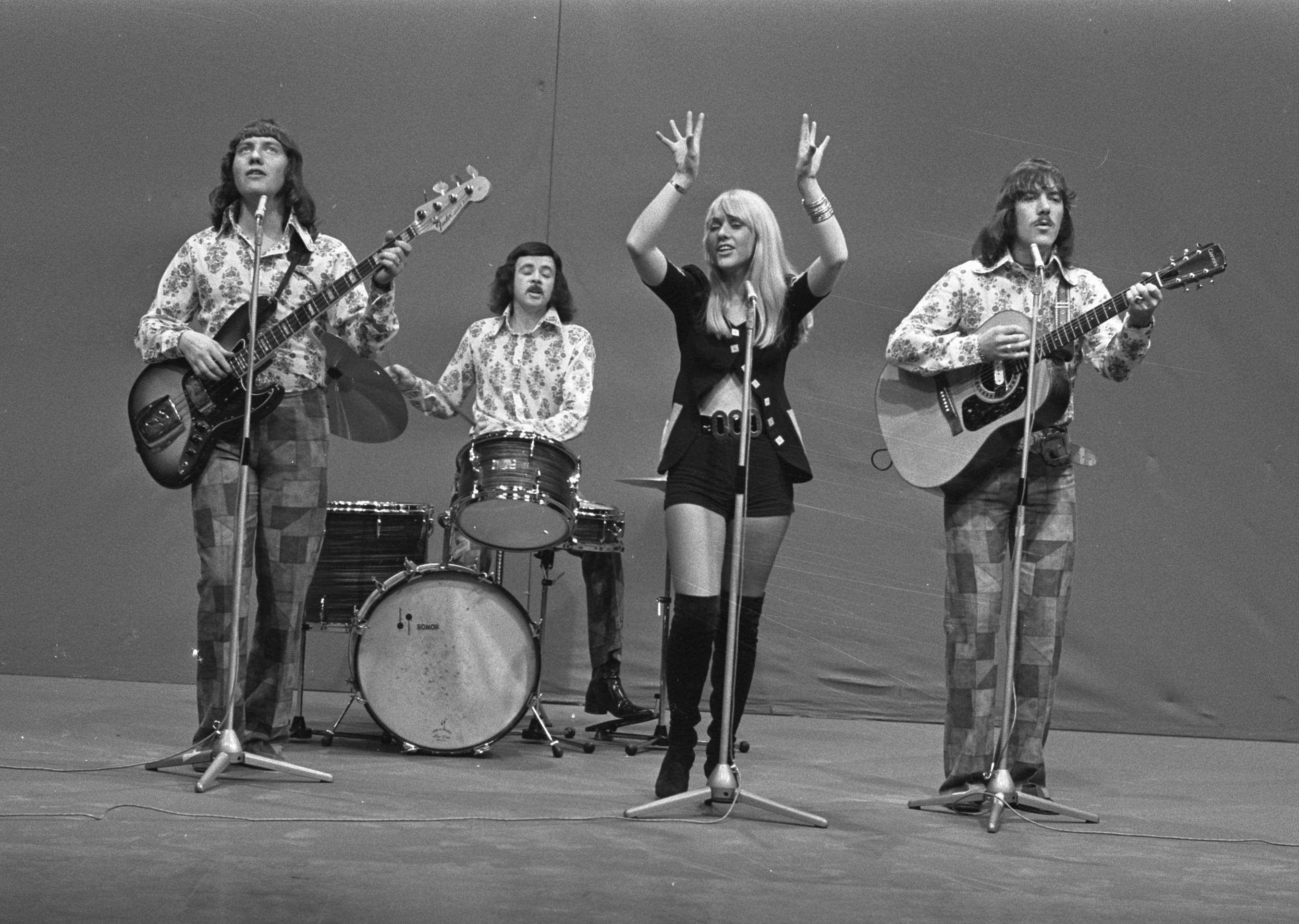
Scottish band Middle of the Road spent five weeks at number-one with "Chirpy Chirpy Cheep Cheep", which became the third best selling single of 1971, while "Tweedle Dee, Tweedle Dum" reached number two.

The UK Singles Chart is one of many music charts compiled by the Official Charts Company that calculates the best-selling singles of the week in the United Kingdom. Before 2004, the chart was only based on the sales of physical singles. This list shows singles that peaked in the Top 10 of the UK Singles Chart during 1971, as well as singles which peaked in 1970 and 1972 but were in the top 10 in 1971. The entry date is when the single appeared in the top 10 for the first time (week ending, as published by the Official Charts Company, which is six days after the chart is announced).

One-hundred and six singles were in the top ten in 1971. Ten singles from 1970 remained in the top 10 for several weeks at the beginning of the year, while "Something Tells Me (Something's Gonna Happen Tonight)" by Cilla Black was released in 1971 but did not reach its peak until 1972. "Grandad" by Clive Dunn, "I'll Be There" by The Jackson 5 and "Ride a White Swan" by T. Rex were the singles from 1970 to reach their peak in 1971. Sixteen artists scored multiple entries in the top 10 in 1971. Bay City Rollers, Elton John, The New Seekers, Rod Stewart and Slade were among the many artists who achieved their first UK charting top 10 single in 1971.

The 1970 Christmas number-one, "I Hear You Knocking" by Dave Edmunds, remained at number-one for the first week of 1971. The first new number-one single of the year was "Grandad" by Clive Dunn. Overall, thirteen different singles peaked at number-one in 1971, with T. Rex (2) having the most singles hit that position.

== Background ==
=== Multiple entries ===
One-hundred and six singles charted in the top 10 in 1971, with one-hundred and two singles reaching their peak this year.

Seventeen artists scored multiple entries in the top 10 in 1971. Elvis Presley and T. Rex shared the record for most top 10 hits in 1971 with four hit singles each.

George Harrison was one of a number of artists with two top-ten entries, including the number-one single "My Sweet Lord". Andy Williams, Dave and Ansell Collins, Gilbert O'Sullivan, Mungo Jerry and The Supremes were among the other artists who had multiple top 10 entries in 1971.

=== Chart debuts ===
Forty-three artists achieved their first top 10 single in 1971, either as a lead or featured artist. Of these, five went on to record another hit single that year: C.C.S., Dave and Ansell Collins, John Kongos, Middle of the Road and Olivia Newton-John. Dawn had two other entries in their breakthrough year.

The following table (collapsed on desktop site) does not include acts who had previously charted as part of a group and secured their first top 10 solo single.

Artist	Number of top 10s	First entry	Chart position	Other entries
Judy Collins	1	"Amazing Grace"	5	—
The Mixtures	1	"The Pushbike Song"	2	—
Ashton, Gardner and Dyke	1	"The Resurrection Shuffle"	3	—
Elton John	1	"Your Song"	7	—
Dawn	3	"Candida"	9	"Knock Three Times" (1), "What Are You Doing Sunday" (3)
Lynn Anderson	1	"Rose Garden"	3	—
C.C.S.	2	"Walking"	7	"Tap Turns on the Water" (5)
Dave and Ansell Collins	2	"Double Barrel	1	"Monkey Spanner" (7)
Olivia Newton-John	2	"If Not for You"	7	"Banks of the Ohio" (6)
Waldo de los Ríos	1	"Mozart Symphony No. 40"	5	—
The Fantastics	1	"Something Old, Something New"	9	—
R. Dean Taylor	1	"Indiana Wants Me"	2	—
East of Eden	1	"Jig-a-Jig"	7	—
The Elgins	1	"Heaven Must Have Sent You"	3	—
Séverine	1	"Un banc, un arbre, une rue"	9	—
Tony Christie	1	"I Did What I Did for Maria"	2	—
Tami Lynn	1	"I'm Gonna Run Away from You"	4	—
Middle of the Road	2	"Chirpy Chirpy Cheep Cheep"	1	"Tweedle Dee, Tweedle Dum" (2)
John Kongos	2	"He's Gonna Step on You Again"	4	"Tokoloshe Man" (4)
Hurricane Smith	1	"Don't Let It Die"	2	—
Sweet	1	"Co-Co"	2	—
Greyhound	1	"Black and White"	6	—
Lobo	1	"Me and You and a Dog Named Boo"	4	—
New World	1	"Tom-Tom Turnaround"	6	—
The New Seekers	1	"Never Ending Song of Love"	2	—
Atomic Rooster	1	"Devil's Answer"	4	—
The Pioneers	1	"Let Your Yeah Be Yeah"	5	—
Buffy Sainte-Marie	1	"Soldier Blue"	7	—
The Tams	1	"Hey Girl Don't Bother Me"	1	—
Lee Hazlewood	1	"Did You Ever"	2	—
Curved Air	1	"Back Street Luv"	4	—
Rod Stewart	1	"Maggie May"/"Reason to Believe"	1	—
James Taylor	1	"You've Got a Friend"	4	—
Redbone	1	"The Witch Queen of New Orleans"	2	—
Titanic	1	"Sultana"	5	—
Al Green	1	"Tired of Being Alone"	4	—
Bay City Rollers	1	"Keep On Dancing"	9	—
Slade	1	"Coz I Luv You"	1	—
The Piglets	1	"Johnny Reggae"	3	—
Springwater	1	"I Will Return"	5	—
Benny Hill	1	"Ernie (The Fastest Milkman in the West)"	1	—
The Newbeats	1	"Run, Baby Run (Back Into My Arms)"	10	—
Isaac Hayes	1	"Theme from Shaft"	4	—

Notes

George Harrison started his post-Beatles career with his debut solo single in 1971, "My Sweet Lord", topping the chart. A second single, "Bangla-Desh", also charted at number 10 this year. Fellow bandmate Paul McCartney also began life away from The Beatles with his first solo top 10 hit, "Another Day", which reached number two. With John Lennon having charted with Plastic Ono Band and a debut solo single the previous year, Ringo Starr became the final member to go it alone in 1971. His first release was the number 4 hit "It Don't Come Easy".

Before finding success as lead singer with Dawn, Tony Orlando had achieved a solo UK top 10 entry in 1961 with "Bless You", which reached number 5.

=== Songs from films ===
Original songs from various films entered the top 10 throughout the year. These included "(Where Do I Begin?) Love Story" (from Love Story) and "Theme from "Shaft"" (Shaft).

=== Charity singles ===
George Harrison released the single "Bangla Desh" as a follow-up to debut solo single "My Sweet Lord". The single highlighted the plight of refugees in Bangladesh (previously known as East Pakistan) after the country was hit by the 1970 Bhola cyclone. The song was performed by Harrison at The Concert for Bangladesh, a benefit concert to aid victims and survivors. The single charted in the UK at number ten on 28 August 1971.

=== Best-selling singles ===
George Harrison had the best-selling single of the year with "My Sweet Lord". The single spent ten weeks in the top 10 (including five weeks at number one), sold over 890,000 copies and was certified silver by the BPI. "Maggie May"/"Reason to Believe" by Rod Stewart came in second place, selling more than 615,000 copies and losing out by around 275,000 sales. Middle of the Road's "Chirpy Chirpy Cheep Cheep", "Knock Three Times" from Tony Orlando and Dawn and "Hot Love" by T. Rex made up the top five. Singles by The Mixtures, The New Seekers, Diana Ross, The Tams and T. Rex ("Get It On") were also in the top ten best-selling singles of the year.

== Top-ten singles ==
Key

Symbol	Meaning
‡	Single peaked in 1970 but still in chart in 1971.
♦	Single released in 1971 but peaked in 1972.
(#)	Year-end top-ten single position and rank
Entered	The date that the single first appeared in the chart.
Peak	Highest position that the single reached in the UK Singles Chart.

Entered (week ending)	Weeks in top 10	Single	Artist	Peak	Peak reached (week ending)	Weeks at peak
Singles in 1970
21 November 1970	10	"Cracklin' Rosie" ‡ ^{[A]}	Neil Diamond	3	5 December 1970	4
28 November 1970	10	"I Hear You Knocking" ‡	Dave Edmunds	1	28 November 1970	6
28 November 1970	9	"Ride a White Swan" ^{[B]}	T. Rex	2	23 January 1971	1
5 December 1970	8	"When I'm Dead And Gone" ‡	McGuinness Flint	2	12 December 1970	3
12 December 1970	6	"It's Only Make Believe" ‡	Glen Campbell	4	12 December 1970	4
12 December 1970	6	"Home Lovin' Man" ‡	Andy Williams	7	12 December 1970	4
19 December 1970	8	"I'll Be There"	The Jackson 5	4	23 January 1971	1
19 December 1970	10	"Grandad"	Clive Dunn	1	9 January 1971	3
19 December 1970	5	"Nothing Rhymed" ‡	Gilbert O'Sullivan	8	19 December 1970	4
19 December 1970	3	"My Prayer" ‡	Gerry Monroe	9	19 December 1970	3
Singles in 1971
9 January 1971	2	"(Blame It) On the Pony Express"	Johnny Johnson and the Bandwagon	7	9 January 1971	1
23 January 1971	4	"Apeman"	The Kinks	5	23 January 1971	2
23 January 1971	10	"My Sweet Lord" (#1)	George Harrison	1	30 January 1971	5
23 January 1971	9	"Amazing Grace" ^{[C]}	Judy Collins	5	13 February 1971	2
23 January 1971	1	"You Don't Have to Say You Love Me"	Elvis Presley	9	23 January 1971	1
23 January 1971	2	"Black Skin Blue Eyed Boys"	The Equals	9	30 January 1971	1
30 January 1971	8	"The Pushbike Song" (#6)	The Mixtures	2	6 February 1971	4
6 February 1971	6	"Stoned Love"	The Supremes	3	6 February 1971	2
6 February 1971	4	"No Matter What"	Badfinger	5	6 February 1971	1
6 February 1971	6	"The Resurrection Shuffle" ^{[D]}	Ashton, Gardner and Dyke	3	20 February 1971	2
13 February 1971	3	"Your Song"	Elton John	7	13 February 1971	1
13 February 1971	3	"Candida"	Tony Orlando and Dawn	9	27 February 1971	1
20 February 1971	8	"It's Impossible"	Perry Como	4	27 February 1971	1
27 February 1971	7	"Baby Jump"	Mungo Jerry	1	6 March 1971	2
6 March 1971	6	"Another Day"	Paul McCartney	2	13 March 1971	2
6 March 1971	4	"Sweet Caroline"	Neil Diamond	8	13 March 1971	2
6 March 1971	8	"Rose Garden"	Lynn Anderson	3	27 March 1971	4
13 March 1971	10	"Hot Love" (#5)	T. Rex	1	20 March 1971	6
20 March 1971	1	"Strange Kind of Woman"	Deep Purple	8	20 March 1971	1
27 March 1971	7	"Bridget the Midget (The Queen of the Blues)"	Ray Stevens	2	3 April 1971	3
27 March 1971	5	"Jack in the Box" ^{[F]}	Clodagh Rodgers	4	10 April 1971	1
3 April 1971	3	"Power to the People"	John Lennon & Plastic Ono Band	7	3 April 1971	1
3 April 1971	3	"There Goes My Everything"	Elvis Presley	6	10 April 1971	1
3 April 1971	5	"Walking"	C.C.S.	7	10 April 1971	1
17 April 1971	7	"Double Barrel"	Dave and Ansell Collins	1	1 May 1971	2
17 April 1971	6	"(Where Do I Begin?) Love Story"	Andy Williams	4	24 April 1971	1
17 April 1971	2	"If Not for You"	Olivia Newton-John	7	24 April 1971	1
24 April 1971	5	"Mozart Symphony No. 40"	Waldo de los Ríos	5	1 May 1971	3
24 April 1971	2	"Something Old, Something New" ^{[G]}	The Fantastics	9	24 April 1971	2
1 May 1971	10	"Knock Three Times" (#4)	Tony Orlando and Dawn	1	15 May 1971	5
1 May 1971	7	"Brown Sugar"/"Bitch"/"Let It Rock"	The Rolling Stones	2	15 May 1971	3
1 May 1971	5	"It Don't Come Easy"	Ringo Starr	4	8 May 1971	3
1 May 1971	4	"Remember Me"	Diana Ross	7	8 May 1971	2
15 May 1971	6	"Indiana Wants Me"	R. Dean Taylor	2	5 June 1971	1
15 May 1971	4	"Jig-a-Jig"	East of Eden	7	22 May 1971	2
22 May 1971	5	"Heaven Must Have Sent You"	The Elgins	3	5 June 1971	1
22 May 1971	3	"Malt and Barley Blues"	McGuinness Flint	5	29 May 1971	1
29 May 1971	3	"My Brother Jake"	Free	4	29 May 1971	2
29 May 1971	1	"Un banc, un arbre, une rue" ^{[H]}	Séverine	9	29 May 1971	1
5 June 1971	4	"I Am... I Said"	Neil Diamond	4	12 June 1971	1
5 June 1971	6	"I Did What I Did for Maria"	Tony Christie	2	12 June 1971	2
5 June 1971	1	"Rags to Riches"	Elvis Presley	9	5 June 1971	1
12 June 1971	5	"Lady Rose"	Mungo Jerry	5	26 June 1971	1
12 June 1971	6	"I'm Gonna Run Away From You"	Tami Lynn	4	26 June 1971	1
12 June 1971	7	"The Banner Man"	Blue Mink	3	26 June 1971	2
19 June 1971	10	"Chirpy Chirpy Cheep Cheep" (#3)	Middle of the Road	1	19 June 1971	5
19 June 1971	5	"He's Gonna Step on You Again"	John Kongos	4	3 July 1971	1
26 June 1971	6	"Don't Let It Die"	Hurricane Smith	2	3 July 1971	1
26 June 1971	8	"Co-Co"	Sweet	2	10 July 1971	2
3 July 1971	3	"Just My Imagination (Running Away with Me)" ^{[I]}	The Temptations	8	10 July 1971	1
10 July 1971	4	"Black and White"	Greyhound	6	17 July 1971	2
17 July 1971	8	"Get It On" (#10)	T. Rex	1	24 July 1971	4
17 July 1971	5	"Me and You and a Dog Named Boo"	Lobo	4	24 July 1971	2
17 July 1971	4	"Monkey Spanner"	Dave and Ansell Collins	7	17 July 1971	3
24 July 1971	5	"Tom-Tom Turnaround"	New World	6	31 July 1971	1
31 July 1971	8	"Never Ending Song of Love" (#7)	The New Seekers	2	7 August 1971	5
31 July 1971	6	"Devil's Answer"	Atomic Rooster	4	7 August 1971	3
7 August 1971	8	"I'm Still Waiting" (#8)	Diana Ross	1	21 August 1971	4
7 August 1971	3	"Won't Get Fooled Again"	The Who	9	14 August 1971	2
14 August 1971	4	"In My Own Time"	Family	4	4 September 1971	1
21 August 1971	5	"What Are You Doing Sunday"	Tony Orlando and Dawn	3	28 August 1971	2
21 August 1971	1	"Heartbreak Hotel"/"Hound Dog" ^{[J]}	Elvis Presley	10	21 August 1971	1
28 August 1971	3	"Let Your Yeah Be Yeah"	The Pioneers	5	11 September 1971	1
28 August 1971	4	"Soldier Blue"	Buffy Sainte-Marie	7	4 September 1971	2
28 August 1971	9	"Hey Girl Don't Bother Me" (#9)	The Tams	1	18 September 1971	3
28 August 1971	1	"Bangla Desh" ^{[K]}	George Harrison	10	28 August 1971	1
4 September 1971	3	"It's Too Late"/"I Feel the Earth Move"	Carole King	6	18 September 1971	1
11 September 1971	7	"Did You Ever"	Nancy Sinatra & Lee Hazlewood	2	25 September 1971	1
11 September 1971	4	"Nathan Jones"	The Supremes	5	18 September 1971	2
11 September 1971	2	"Back Street Luv"	Curved Air	4	18 September 1971	1
18 September 1971	4	"I Believe (In Love)"	Hot Chocolate	8	18 September 1971	2
25 September 1971	10	"Maggie May"/"Reason to Believe" (#2)	Rod Stewart	1	9 October 1971	5
25 September 1971	7	"Tweedle Dee, Tweedle Dum"	Middle of the Road	2	16 October 1971	1
25 September 1971	4	"Tap Turns on the Water"	C.C.S.	5	2 October 1971	1
25 September 1971	4	"Cousin Norman"	Marmalade	6	2 October 1971	1
25 September 1971	6	"You've Got a Friend"	James Taylor	4	16 October 1971	2
2 October 1971	6	"For All We Know"	Shirley Bassey	6	16 October 1971	2
9 October 1971	4	"Freedom Come, Freedom Go"	The Fortunes	6	23 October 1971	1
16 October 1971	5	"The Witch Queen of New Orleans"	Redbone	2	23 October 1971	3
23 October 1971	4	"A Simple Game"	Four Tops	3	6 November 1971	1
23 October 1971	4	"Sultana"	Titanic	5	30 October 1971	1
30 October 1971	4	"Tired of Being Alone"	Al Green	4	6 November 1971	1
30 October 1971	1	"Keep On Dancing"	Bay City Rollers	9	30 October 1971	1
6 November 1971	8	"Till"	Tom Jones	2	20 November 1971	1
6 November 1971	3	"The Night They Drove Old Dixie Down"	Joan Baez	6	6 November 1971	1
6 November 1971	8	"Coz I Luv You"	Slade	1	13 November 1971	4
13 November 1971	5	"Johnny Reggae"	The Piglets	3	20 November 1971	1
13 November 1971	4	"I Will Return"	Springwater	5	20 November 1971	1
20 November 1971	6	"Banks of the Ohio"	Olivia Newton-John	6	20 November 1971	2
20 November 1971	7	"Gypsys, Tramps & Thieves"	Cher	4	27 November 1971	2
20 November 1971	9	"Jeepster"	T. Rex	2	27 November 1971	5
27 November 1971	8	"Ernie (The Fastest Milkman in the West)"	Benny Hill	1	11 December 1971	4
27 November 1971	1	"Surrender"	Diana Ross	10	27 November 1971	1
4 December 1971	5	"Tokoloshe Man"	John Kongos	4	11 December 1971	1
4 December 1971	1	"Run, Baby Run (Back Into My Arms)"	The Newbeats	10	4 December 1971	1
11 December 1971	5	"Theme from Shaft"	Isaac Hayes	4	18 December 1971	2
11 December 1971	5	"No Matter How I Try"	Gilbert O'Sullivan	5	18 December 1971	2
18 December 1971	5	"Something Tells Me (Something's Gonna Happen Tonight)" ♦	Cilla Black	3	1 January 1972	1

== Entries by artist ==
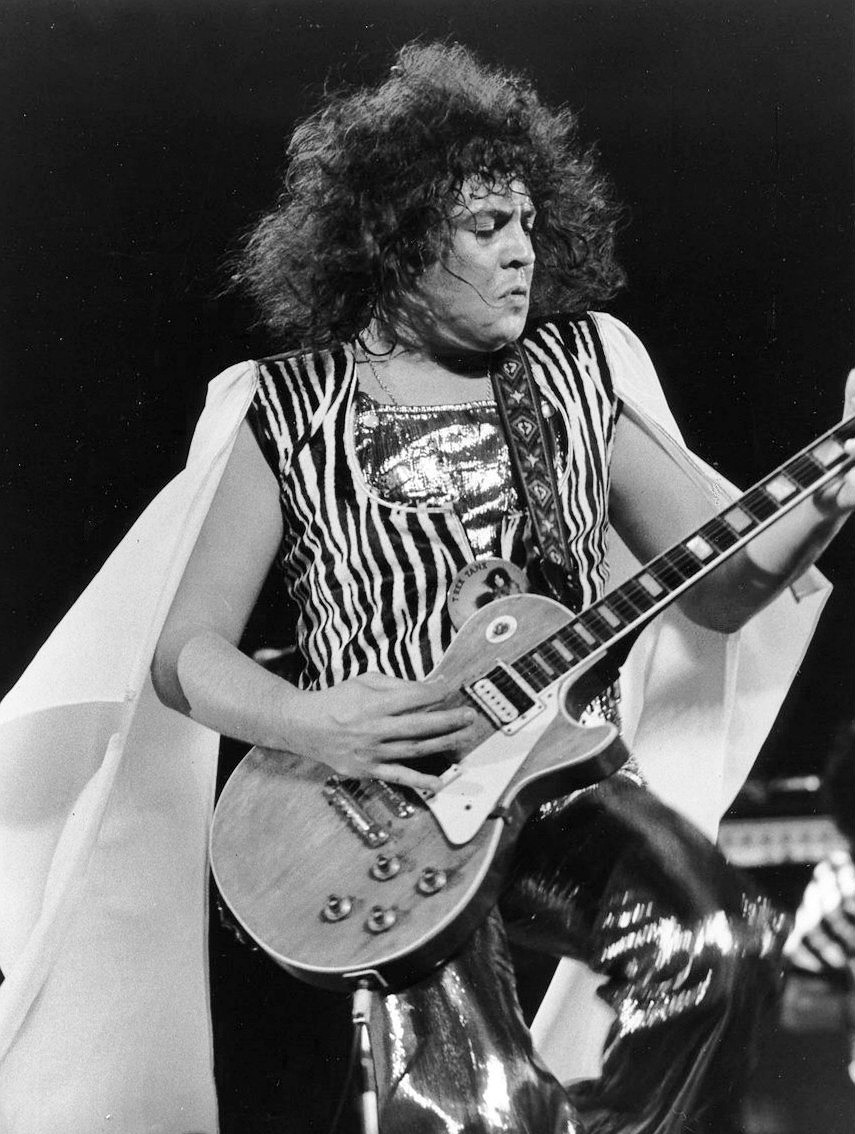
Marc Bolan and his band T. Rex secured four top 10 entries this year, two of which reached number-one: "Hot Love" and "Get It On"

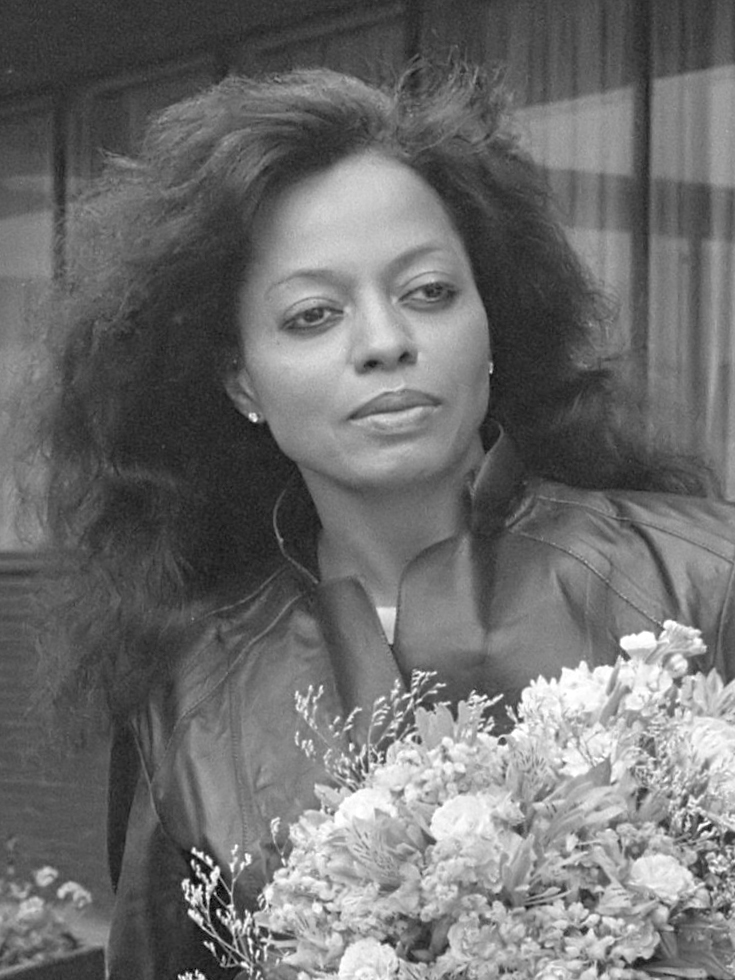
Diana Ross achieved three top 10 singles in 1971, the most successful of which was "I'm Still Waiting", which spent four weeks at number-one.

The following table shows artists who achieved two or more top 10 entries in 1971, including singles that reached their peak in 1970. The figures include both main artists and featured artists, while appearances on ensemble charity records are also counted for each artist. The total number of weeks an artist spent in the top ten in 1971 is also shown.

Entries	Artist	Weeks	Singles
4	Elvis Presley	6	"Heartbreak Hotel"/"Hound Dog", "Rags to Riches", "There Goes My Everything", "You Don't Have to Say You Love Me"
4	T. Rex ^{[K]}	30	"Get It On", "Hot Love", "Jeepster", "Ride a White Swan"
3	Diana Ross	13	"I'm Still Waiting", "Remember Me", "Surrender"
3	Neil Diamond ^{[L]}	12	"Cracklin' Rosie", "I Am... I Said", "Sweet Caroline"
3	Tony Orlando and Dawn	18	"Candida", "Knock Three Times", "What Are You Doing Sunday"
2	Andy Williams ^{[L]}	9	"Home Lovin' Man", "(Where Do I Begin?) Love Story"
2	C.C.S.	9	"Tap Turns on the Water", "Walking"
2	Dave and Ansell Collins	11	"Double Barrel", "Monkey Spanner"
2	George Harrison	11	"Bangla Desh", "My Sweet Lord"
2	Gilbert O'Sullivan ^{[L]}	6	"No Matter How I Try", "Nothing Rhymed"
2	John Kongos	9	"He's Gonna Step on You Again", "Tokoloshe Man"
2	McGuinness Flint ^{[L]}	7	"Malt and Barley Blues", "When I'm Dead and Gone"
2	Middle of the Road	17	"Chirpy Chirpy Cheep Cheep", "Tweedle Dee, Tweedle Dum"
2	Mungo Jerry	12	"Baby Jump", "Lady Rose"
2	Olivia Newton-John	8	"Banks of the Ohio", "If Not for You"
2	The Supremes	10	"Nathan Jones", "Stoned Love"

== Notes ==
- ^{a} "Cracklin' Rosie" re-entered the top 10 at number 10 on 30 January 1971 (week ending).
- ^{b} "Ride a White Swan" re-entered the top 10 at number 10 on 2 January 1971 (week ending) for 6 weeks.
- ^{c} "Amazing Grace" re-entered the top 10 at number 6 on 27 March 1971 (week ending).
- ^{d} "Resurrection Shuffle" re-entered the top 10 at number 10 on 20 March 1971 (week ending).
- ^{e} "Jack in the Box" was the United Kingdom's entry at the Eurovision Song Contest in 1971.
- ^{f} "Something Old, Something New" re-entered the top 10 at number 9 on 8 May 1971 (week ending).
- ^{g} "Un banc, un arbre, une rue" was Monaco's winning entry at the Eurovision Song Contest in 1971.
- ^{h} "Just My Imagination (Running Away with Me)" re-entered the top 10 at number 10 on 24 July 1971 (week ending).
- ^{i} Both "Heartbreak Hotel" and "Hound Dog" made the UK Singles Chart as separate entries when initially released in 1956. Both singles peaked at number two. The two songs were re-issued together as a double A-sided single in 1971. This re-release was part of an RCA Records series entitled "Maxi Million".
- ^{j} "Bangla Desh" was released as a charity single to raise awareness of refugees in Bangladesh (formerly East Pakistan) following the 1970 Bhola cyclone, backed by a relief concert.
- ^{k} Figure includes single that first charted in 1970 but peaked in 1971.
- ^{l} Figure includes single that peaked in 1970.

== See also ==
- 1971 in British music
- List of number-one singles from the 1970s (UK)
