= Povl Dissing =

Danish singer (1938–2022)

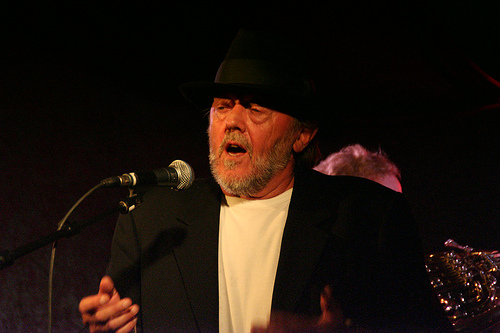
- Dissing in 2006
- Born: 27 January 1938; Farum, Denmark
- Died: 18 July 2022 (aged 84); Hundested, Denmark
- Occupations: Singer, composer, guitarist
- Notable work: Svantes viser

Povl Dissing (27 January 1938 – 18 July 2022) was a Danish singer, composer, guitarist, and harmonica player. He made his album debut with En aften i folkeklubben in 1965. His public breakthrough came in 1973 with the album Svantes viser, a collaboration with poet Benny Andersen, whom he has cooperated closely with since. In 2006, Svantes viser was selected for the Danish Culture Canon.

Povl Dissing grew up in Stavnsholt, a small village near Farum north of Copenhagen, and was educated commercial artist from which he made a living before turning to music full time. Originally he played the trumpet and jazz music, but an injuring accident in his early youth made him take up the guitar instead. He sang almost exclusively in Danish and played and worked with many other notable Danish musicians. He died on 18 July 2022 at the age of 84.

== Style ==
Dissing played a mixture of blues, folk and rock music and he was among the pioneers in using Danish language in rock in Denmark in the early 1960s. He sang in an unusual and very personal and emotional way, something that caused a lot of animosity towards him in the beginning of his career. However, Svantes viser from 1973 became a public darling in Denmark and his audience grew.

Throughout his career, Dissing covered and interpreted many traditional Scandinavian and Danish songs and ballads, including Bellman, Grundtvig, Thomas Laub and Henrik Rung, but also contemporary ballads and schlagers. He also composed music for several contemporary Danish poets, including Halfdan Rasmussen, Vagn Lundbye and in particular Benny Andersen. Many of his songs were composed and written by Dissing himself.

== Bands and collaborations ==
Dissing collaborated and recorded with many notable performers and artists in Denmark and Norway, including musicians Cæsar, Trille, Freddy Fræk, Benny Holst, Peter Thorup, Fuzzy, Irene Becker, Egon Aagaard, John von Daler, Knut Reiersrud, bands The Beefeaters, Burnin Red Ivanhoe and The Brazz Brothers, and poets Halfdan Rasmussen and Benny Andersen.

Apart from music, Dissing also voiced cartoons and films and narrated audiobooks.

Dissing had two sons, Rasmus and Jonas. They are also musicians and from the early 2000s they played and toured with Povl on a regular basis in their band Dissing, Dissing, Las og Dissing. They released three studio albums. In 2017, Dissing fell and hit his head, losing hearing on both ears.
