= C.C.S. 2 =

C.C.S.

Studio album by CCS
- Released: 1972
- Recorded: 1971 – 1972
- Genre: Blues, Jazz
- Length: 44:28
- Label: RAK
- Producer: Mickie Most

CCS chronology
C.C.S. (1970)	C.C.S. (1972)	The Best Band in the Land (1972)

Singles from C.C.S.
- 1. "Brother" Released: 11 February 1972 (UK only)

Professional ratings
Review scores
Source	Rating
AllMusic	1.5/5 stars

C.C.S. was the second studio album of the British blues and jazz outfit CCS, led by guitarist Alexis Korner. This album is usually called C.C.S. 2 to avoid confusion with the first, eponymous album, even though that title cannot be found anywhere on the record or sleeve.

It included covers of songs by such diverse artists as Led Zeppelin and The Jackson 5. On the UK Official Chart, the album charted at number 23, while the single "Brother" charted at number 25.

== Track listing ==
=== Side one ===
1. "Brother" (Alexis Korner) – 3:23
2. "Black Dog" (Robert Plant, Jimmy Page, John Paul Jones) – 4:07
3. "I Want You Back" (The Corporation) – 3:41
4. "Running Out of Sky (Sky Diver)" (John Cameron) – 3:58
5. "Whole Lotta Rock 'n' Roll" – 6:11
  1. "School Day" (Chuck Berry)
  2. "Long Tall Sally" (Albert Collins, Richard Penniman)
  3. "Whole Lotta Love" (Page, John Bonham, Jones, Plant)

=== Side two ===
1. "Chaos: Can't We Ever Get It Back" (Korner) – 8:52
2. "This Is My Life" (Peter Thorup) – 3:51
3. "Misunderstood" (Cameron) – 2:46
4. "Maggie's Song" (Korner) – 3:39
5. "City" (Cameron) – 3:34

== Personnel ==
=== Musicians ===
- Alexis Korner – guitar, vocals
- Peter Thorup – vocals
- Herbie Flowers – bass
- Tony Carr – drums
- Harold Beckett, Henry Lowther – trumpet
- Harold McNair – woodwinds

=== Technical ===
- Mickie Most – producer
- John Cameron – arranger
- John Kurlander – engineer
