= Harold McNair =

Jamaican musician

- Born: 5 November 1931; Kingston, Jamaica
- Died: 7 March 1971 (aged 39) Maida Vale, London, England
- Occupations: Saxophonist and flautist

Harold McNair (5 November 1931 – 7 March 1971) was a Jamaican-born saxophonist and flautist.

== Early life ==
McNair was born in Kingston, Jamaica. He attended the Alpha Boys School under the tutelage of Vincent Tulloch, while playing with Joe Harriott (a lifelong friend who considered McNair his de facto younger brother), Wilton "Bogey" Gaynair, and Baba Motta's band. He spent the first decade of his musical career in The Bahamas, where he used the name "Little G" for recordings and live performances. His early Bahamian recordings were mostly in Caribbean musical styles rather than jazz, in which he sang and played both alto and tenor saxophone. He also played a calypso singer in the film Island Women (1958). In 1960, he recorded his first album, a mixture of jazz and calypso numbers entitled Bahama Bash. It was around this time that he began playing the flute, which would eventually become his signature instrument. Initially he had some lessons in New York, but he was largely self-taught. He departed for Europe later in 1960.

== In Europe ==
Like many other Caribbean jazz musicians of the 1950s and 1960s (e.g., Joe Harriott, Dizzy Reece and Harry Beckett), McNair moved to Britain. However, before arriving in London, he toured Europe with Quincy Jones and worked on film and TV scores in Paris. Once in London, he quickly gained a reputation as a formidable player on flute, alto and tenor saxophone, leading to a regular gig at Ronnie Scott's Jazz Club.

His playing drew the admiration of bass player Charles Mingus, who was in London to shoot the motion picture All Night Long (1961). McNair was part of a quartet Mingus formed to rehearse with during his stay in Britain. However, the band never performed in front of a paying audience, due to a ban imposed by the Musicians' Union on US musicians in British nightclubs. A recording of the band exists, playing the earliest recorded version of the Mingus composition "Peggy's Blue Skylight". The Musician's Union ban was lifted later in 1961, leading to a residency by US tenor saxophonist Zoot Sims at Ronnie Scott's club. Ironically, McNair's own quartet were also on the bill, resulting in two of his performances with Phil Seamen on drums being issued. Around the same time, he also recorded with the drummer Tony Crombie and the percussionist Jack Costanzo.

== Later recordings ==
McNair cut his first all-jazz album, Up in the Air with Harold McNair on a visit to Miami, before settling back in London permanently. His first UK album as a leader, Affectionate Fink, was made for the fledgling Island Records in 1965. The session saw him team up with Ornette Coleman's then current rhythm section of David Izenzon (bass) and Charles Moffett (drums), for a set of standards played with hard swinging intensity. McNair equally featured his tenor sax and flute on this session, delivering virtuoso performances on both. His next (self-titled) album, cut for RCA in 1968, recorded at Trident Studios featured probably his best known composition, "The Hipster", which was included on Gilles Peterson's 2004 Impressed Vol. 2 compilation of 1960s British jazz.

His next album was Flute and Nut (RCA, 1970), which featured big band and string arrangements by John Cameron. This was quickly followed up in the same year by The Fence, which moved in the direction of jazz fusion. Another self-titled album was issued posthumously in 1972 by the B&C label, which mixed tracks from the 1968 RCA album with later, unreleased recordings. Recordings as a jazz sideman included sessions with the jazz-rock/big band ensemble Ginger Baker's Air Force and John Cameron's Off Centre. He recorded with visiting Americans Jon Hendricks, pianist/vocalist Blossom Dearie and drummer Philly Joe Jones and performed with saxophonist Eddie "Lockjaw" Davis at the Manchester Sports Guild in 1967.

=== Other recordings ===
McNair's unique phrasing on the flute in particular led to great demand for his services among non-jazz musicians, especially during the late 1960s. His flute was featured on the soundtrack for Ken Loach's film Kes (1969), with music written by regular McNair collaborator John Cameron. Another notable soundtrack contribution was his tenor saxophone on the original 1962 soundtrack theme from Dr. No and his solo flute on Johnny Harris, Movements (Warner Bros. 1970) that was originally recorded for the original soundtrack of the film Fragment of Fear.

His best-known sideman role came via his regular participation (with Cameron) on Donovan's mid-to-late 1960s recording sessions, and as a member of Donovan's touring band. McNair arranged the hit single "There Is a Mountain" (1967) and played the flute riff. Donovan's live album Donovan in Concert features McNair's flute and tenor extensively and demonstrates some of his finest recorded work.

Throughout the late 1960s he also played on many other jazz-inflected folk music and progressive rock albums, including John Martyn's The Tumbler and Davy Graham's Large as Life and Twice as Natural.

=== Death ===
McNair died of lung cancer in Maida Vale, North London, on Sunday, 7 March 1971, at the age of 39.

== Discography ==
=== As leader ===
- as Little G, Bahama Bash (Top Rank, 1960)
- Up in the Air with Harold McNair (Bahamian Rhythms, 1964)
- Affectionate Fink with Alan Branscombe, David Izenzon, Charles Moffett (Island, 1965)
- Harold McNair with Bill Le Sage, Spike Heatley, Tony Carr (RCA, 1968)
- Flute and Nut with John Cameron (RCA, 1970)
- The Fence with Keith Tippett, Ric Grech, Terry Cox, Danny Thompson, Tony Carr, Colin Green, Alan Branscombe (B&C, 1970) – reissued on CD in 2007 by Hux Records
- Harold McNair (B&C, 1972)

Appearance in compilations

- V.A., Bacchanal At Chez Paul Meers (Carib, 1958)[2EP] – two tracks only as bandleader [Peanuts Taylor & Orchestra LP]
- Alpha Boys' School Music in Education (Trojan, 2006) – one track only ("The Hipster" taken from Harold McNair)

=== As sideman ===
- Quincy Jones Big Band, Swiss Radio Days Jazz Series, Vol. 1: Lausanne 1960 (TCB, 1960)
- Tony Crombie, Whole Lotta Tony (Ember, 1961)
- Jack Costanzo, Equation in Rhythm (Fontana, 1962), credited as "Little Jesus"
- Eddie "Lockjaw" Davis, Oh Gee: Live in Manchester (Jasmine, 1967)
- Jimi Hendrix, Axis Bold as Love, on the track If 6 was 9 (Reprise RS 6281)
- Philly Joe Jones, Trailways Express (Black Lion, 1968), with Peter King, Kenny Wheeler
- John Cameron, Off Centre (Deram, 1969)
- Blossom Dearie, That's Just the Way I Want to Be (Fontana, 1970)
- Jon Hendricks, Live (Fontana, 1970)
- Ginger Baker's Air Force, Ginger Baker's Air Force (Polydor, 1970), with Steve Winwood, Rick Grech, Denny Laine, Chris Wood, Graham Bond
- Phil Seamen, The Late Great Phil Seamen (SWP Records SWP 037, 2009), on the track Tangerine, with Terry Shannon, Jeff Clyne, Phil Seamen

=== Session musician credits ===
With CCS

- CCS (Rak, 1970)
- CCS II (Rak, 1972)

With Syd Dale

- Flamboyant Themes – Vol. III (KPM, 1968)
- Chorus And Orchestra (KPM, 1969)

With Donovan

- Fairytale (Pye, 1965)
- Sunshine Superman (Epic, 1966)
- Mellow Yellow (Epic, 1967)
- A Gift from a Flower to a Garden (Pye, 1967)
- Donovan in Concert (Pye, 1968)
- Hurdy Gurdy Man (Epic, 1968)
- Barabajagal (1969)

With others

- Lionel Bart, Isn't This Where We Came In? (Deram, 1968)
- Brian Bennett – Illustrated London Noise (Columbia, 1969)
- Marc Brierley, Hello (CBS, 1969)
- John Cameron, Kes: Original Sound Track (Trunk, 2001) – rec. 1968
- Peter Collins, Peter Collins First Album (Decca Nova, 1970)
- Cressida, Asylum (Vertigo, 1971)
- Nick Drake – Bryter Layter (Island, 1970)(flautist on Bryter Layer was Lyn Dobson)
- Davy Graham, Large as Life and Twice as Natural (Decca, 1968)
- Kathe Green, Run the Length of Your Wildness (Deram, 1969)
- The Picadilly Line, The Huge World of Emily Small (CBS, 1967)
- Johnny Harris, Movements (Warner Bros., 1970)
- Rosetta Hightower, Hightower (CBS, 1970)
- Tim Hollier, Skysail (Philips, 1971)
- Al Jones, Alun Ashworth Jones, (Parlophone, 1969)
- Alexis Korner, Bootleg Him (Warner Bros., 1972)
- Magna Carta, Magna Carta (Mercury, 1969)
- John Martyn, The Tumbler (Island, 1968)
- Don Partridge, Don Partridge (Columbia, 1968)
- Seven Ages of Man, Seven Ages of Man (Rediffusion, 1972)
- Steamhammer, Steamhammer (CBS, 1969)
- Caetano Veloso, Caetano Veloso (Philips, 1971)
