= C.C.S. (album) =

Studio album by CCS
- Released: 1970
- Recorded: 1970
- Genre: Blues, jazz
- Length: 40:34
- Label: RAK
- Producer: Mickie Most

CCS chronology
| C.C.S. (1970) | C.C.S. (1972) |

Singles from C.C.S.
- 1. "Whole Lotta Love" Released: 25 September 1970 (UK) January, 1971 (US)

Professional ratings
Review scores
| Source | Rating |
|---|---|
| AllMusic | 2./5 stars |

C.C.S. was the first studio album of the British blues outfit CCS, led by guitarist Alexis Korner. To avoid confusion with the group's second album with the same name, the album is often called "Whole Lotta Love", due to the inclusion of the Led Zeppelin song. In the UK, "Boom Boom" was issued as the A-side of the single, however "Whole Lotta Love" charted at number 13 on the UK Official Charts. In the US, the single charted at number 58 on the Billboard Hot 100, while the album only charted at number 197 on the Billboard 200.

== Track listing ==
=== Side One ===
1. "Boom Boom" (John Lee Hooker) – 3:32
2. "(I Can't Get No) Satisfaction" (Mick Jagger, Keith Richards) – 4:30
3. "Waiting Song" (Peter Thorup) – 4:32
4. "Lookin' for Fun" (Ole Fick, Peter Thorup) – 3:59
5. "Whole Lotta Love" (Jimmy Page, Willie Dixon, John Bonham, John Paul Jones, Robert Plant) – 3:41

=== Side Two ===
1. "Living in the Past" (Ian Anderson) - instrumental in 5/4 time signature – 3:46
2. "Sunrise" (Alexis Korner) – 5:14
3. "Dos Cantos" (John Cameron) – 8:05
4. "Wade in the Water" (John Cameron) – 2:54

== Personnel ==
=== Musicians ===
- Alexis Korner, Peter Thorup – vocals
- Alan Parker – guitar
- Spike Heatley, Herbie Flowers – bass
- Barry Morgan, Tony Carr – drums
- Bill Le Sage, Jim Lawless – percussion
- John Cameron – piano, conductor, arranger, liner notes
- Bob Efford, Danny Moss, Harold McNair, Ron Ross, Tony Coe – saxophone
- Greg Bowen, Harold Beckett, Henry Lowther, Kenny Wheeler, Les Condon, Tony Fisher – trumpet
- Bill Geldard, Brian Perrin, Don Lusher, John Marshall – trombone
- Adrian Angove – bass (on Whole Lotta Love)

=== Technical ===
- Mickie Most – producer
- Peter Bown – engineer
- Christina – photography
