= Robert Vavra =

American photographer and author (1935–2025)

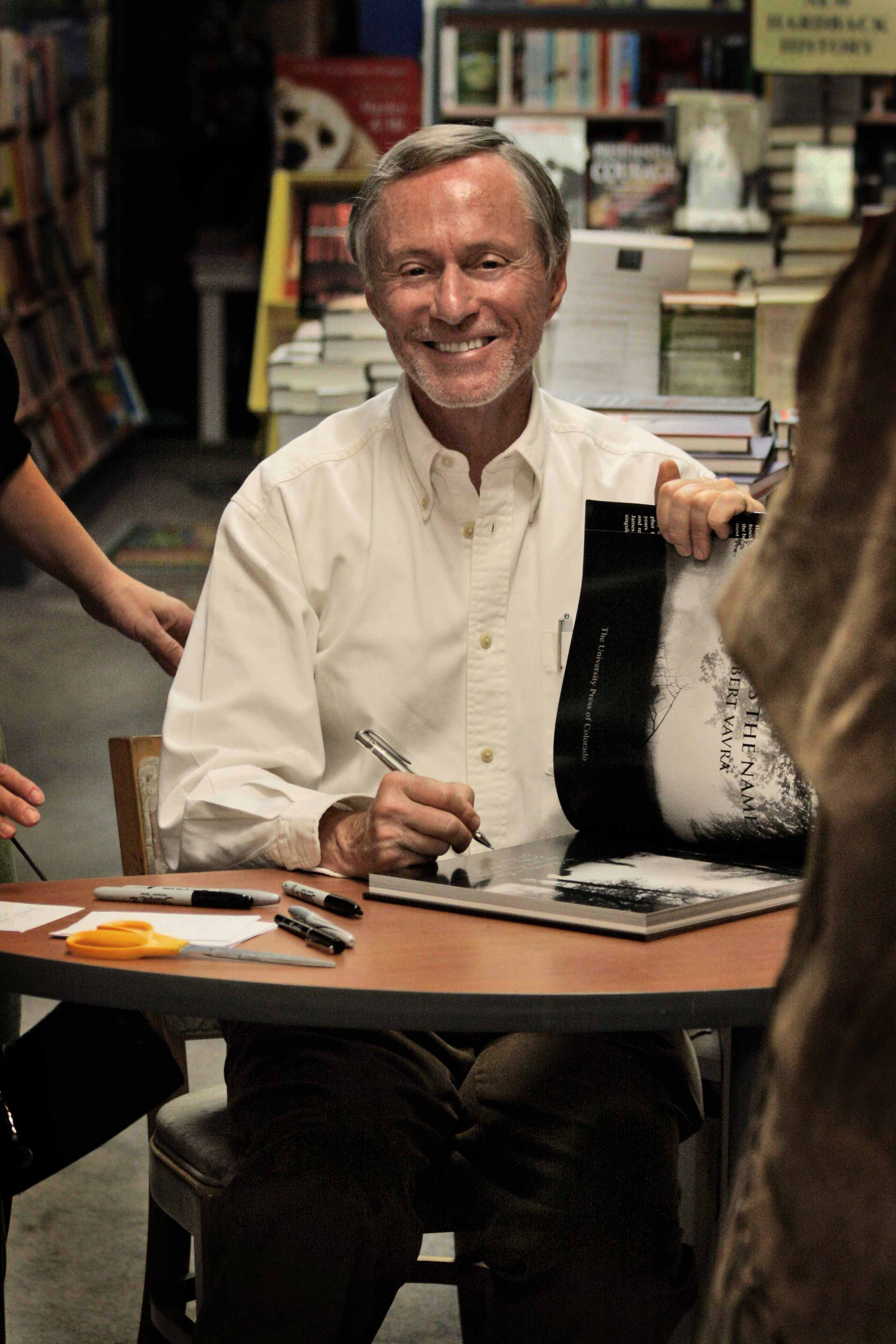
Robert Vavra, 2007.

Robert Vavra (March 9, 1935 – March 3, 2025) was an American photographer and author based in El Cajon, California, California and in Spain in the summer.

== Career ==
Inspired by bulls and bullfighting in Mexico, Vavra moved to Spain in 1958 with a one-way ticket to Madrid on an old Italian ship The Valcania. With no formal training in animals, he spent six years studying the beasts. “I couldn’t obtain the sort of photographs I wanted for the study, so I became a photographer out of necessity,” Vavra was quoted as saying. “I’ve never been interested in the camera ... I don’t really consider myself a photographer. I’m an artist and a storyteller.”

He became immersed in the lore and life of this beast which culminated in the publishing of his book, Bulls of Iberia, in 1972. He was a personal friend of legendary matador de toros Juan Belmonte, riding with him on horseback to check his herds of black bulls, and he shared the dreams, fears, adventures and valor of other toreros, such as the American John Fulton.

In 1988, Vavra established a camp in Ololasurai, Kenya and began what would become a six-year stay with the tribal Maasai people, which led to the publication of A Tent With a View in 1991. He has paid for the education of several Maasai children and financed the building of a school in Mexico, where, since its construction, more than 5000 boys and girls have learned to read and write.

Novelist James Michener once wrote of Vavra: "Though equus has fired the imaginations of painters from Leonardo da Vinci, Velasquez, and Goya to Picasso; still, in the history of photography, no cameraman has recorded the horse with such excitement and personal style as has Robert Vavra. His images are works of art which are a joy to see because they evoke the inner nature of the horse."

Vavra died on March 3, 2025, at the age of 90.

== Books and exhibitions (incomplete) ==
Vavra has published a wide range of adult and children's books. He is the author of over 30 books accounting for more than 3,000,000 volumes in print, in eight languages. He has had more than 100 one-man gallery displays and museum shows in America and Europe.

- Tiger Flower, 1969 (with Fleur Cowles) - ISBN 978-0-688-02841-1
- Lion and Blue, 1974 (with Fleur Cowles) - ISBN 978-0-688-61164-4. Was listed by The New York Times Book Review as among the top ten children's books with the most adult appeal of all time.
- romany free, 1977 (with Fleur Cowles) - Reynal & Company, ISBN 0-688-61193-1
- Such Is the Real Nature of Horses, 1979, William Morrow and Company, New York – ISBN 978-0-688-03504-4
- The Love of Tiger Flower, 1980 (with Fleur Cowles) - ISBN 978-0-688-03737-6
- Unicorns I Have Known, 1983 - ISBN 978-0688022037
- To Be A Unicorn, 1986 (with Fleur Cowles) - ISBN 978-0-002-17959-1
- Blanquito y Toro, 1966 (drawings by John Fulton) - ISBN 978-84-7176-071-5
- Equus: The Creation of a Horse, 1976 - 978–0688032395
- Vavra's Horses, Ten of the World's Most Beautiful Equines, 1989
- The Unicorn of Kilimanjaro, 1990 - ISBN 978-0-688-06850-9
- Stallions of the Quest, ISBN 978-0971260405 ISBN 0971260400 (August 8, 2001)
- Michener's the Name, 2007 - 978–0870818561
- Vavra's Vision, 2007 - ISBN 978-3-8331-4014-3

His work features in and on numerous publications including:

- Iberia: Spanish Travels And Reflections, James Michener
- The Horse Whisperer, Nicholas Evans
- Russian Republics postage stamps
- Max Factor, Roche, Renault and Revlon advertisements

== Films and music related projects ==
His film work includes Lawrence of Arabia and Patton and he was a creative advisor to Robert Redford during the filming of The Horse Whisperer. Jane Goodall and William Shatner have introduced his documentary film on primitive equine behavior, Such Is The Real Nature of Horses, the culmination of 20 years of research.

One of his best known horse-related projects is Horses Of The Wind, a music CD which includes Robert Vavra's photographs. Though mostly music, the CD includes horses' 'voices', a variety of whinnies and other equine vocalizations.
