= Fleur Cowles =

American writer, editor and artist (1908–2009)

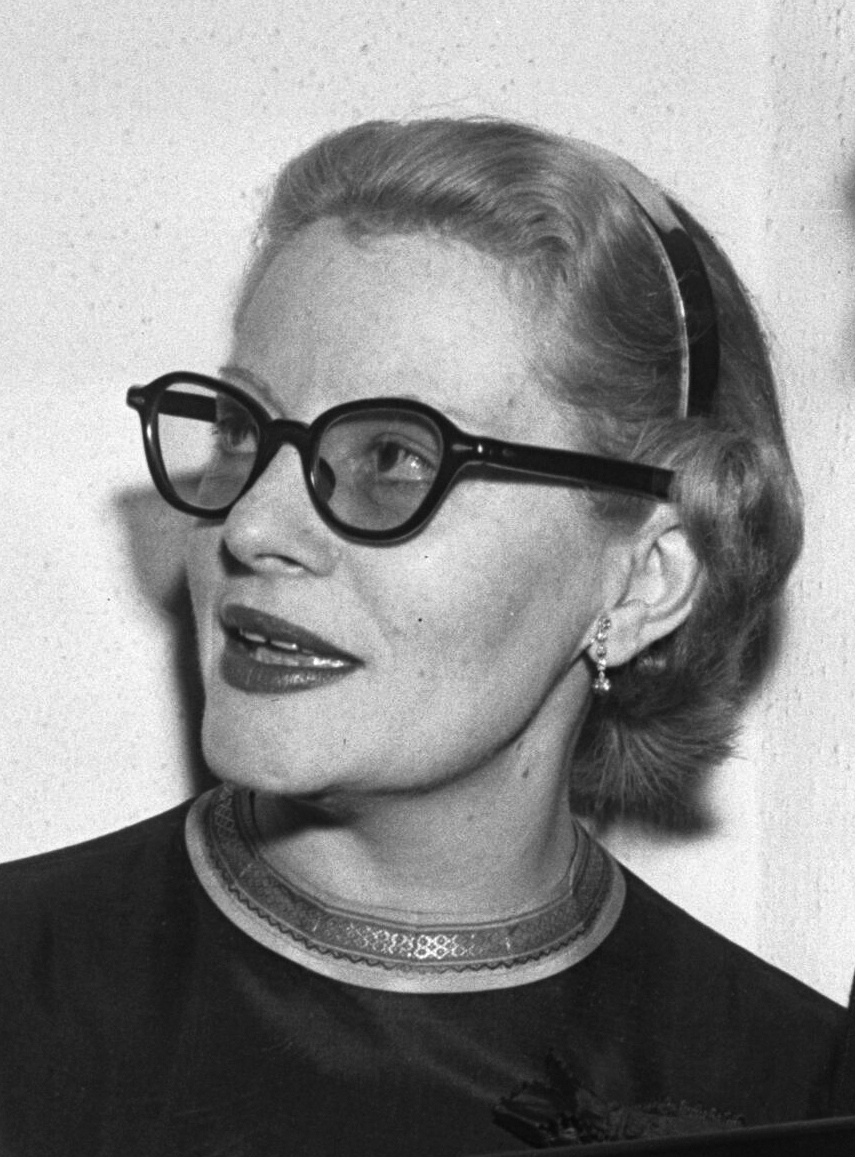
- Cowles in 1954
- Born: Florence Friedman; January 20, 1908; New York, New York
- Died: June 5, 2009 (aged 101)
- Other names: Fleur Fenton
- Known for: Flair magazine
- Spouses: Bertram Klapper (married 1930s?); Atherton "Pett" Pettingell Jr. (married 1937(?)-1946); Gardner Cowles Jr. (m. 1946–1955) Tom Montague Meyer (m. 1955)

Fleur Fenton Cowles (January 20, 1908 – June 5, 2009) was an American writer, editor and artist best known as the creative force behind the short-lived Flair magazine.

== Personal life ==
Fleur Fenton was born Florence Freidman in New York City (although she often claimed to have been born in Montclair, New Jersey). Her parents were Morris Freidman, a novelty salesman, and his wife, Lena. Her siblings adopted the surname Freeman later in life: Dr. Paul William Freeman, a dentist (1906–1966), and Mildred Freeman Goetze

Fleur Cowles' first husband was Bertram Klapper, a manufacturer of wood shoe heels. They later divorced. Her second husband was Atherton "Pett" Pettingell Jr. (1901–1971), an advertising executive who was a grandnephew of Samuel M. Pettingell, who founded one of the first advertising agencies in America in 1850. They married prior to 1937 and divorced in 1946.

Her third husband was Gardner Cowles, Jr. (1903–1982), an heir to the Cowles Media Company, which for a long time owned the Des Moines Register and the Minneapolis Star Tribune. Known as Mike, Cowles was the publisher of his family's Look magazine. They married in 1946 and divorced in 1955. She kept his surname professionally.

In November 1955, she married her fourth and last husband, Tom Montague Meyer (CBE), a timber executive. The Meyers lived for a number of years in London and Sussex, as well as Spain.

== Career ==
In the early and mid 1930s, she wrote a weekly column for The New York World-Telegram. In 1937, she became co-founder and executive vice president of the advertising agency Pettingell & Fenton Inc, which later became known as Hartman & Pettingell Inc, then again as Pettingell & Fenton, and finally as Dorland International-Pettingell Fenton Inc.

She founded it with her second husband, Atherton Pettingell, a former executive vice president of Blacker Advertising. Among its clients were A. S. Beck, the shoe concern, Helena Rubenstein, the cosmetics company, and Cohama Fabrics. She resigned from the firm in 1946.

Describing herself as "rough, uncut, [and] vigorous" as her trademark Russian emerald ring, she told Time, "I've worked hard, and I've made a fortune, and I did it in a man's world, but always, ruthlessly, and with a kind of cruel insistence, I have tried to keep feminine". In 1950, she was lampooned by the writer S. J. Perelman in The New Yorker as glamorous editor "Hyacinth Beddoes Laffoon".

In 1947, she became an associate editor at Look magazine, and a year later, an associate editor at Quick magazine. She resigned her position at Look in November 1955 upon her separation from Gardner Cowles and moved to Europe, where she served as the magazine's foreign editorial consultant. Before founding Flair, Cowles was a special consultant to the Famine Emergency Committee in Washington, D.C.

=== Flair ===
Flair, first issue

Cowles founded Flair magazine in 1950, and it folded a year later. The magazine, which Time described at its launch as "a fancy bouillabaisse of Vogue, Town & Country, Holiday, etc.," was celebrated not only because of its design and editorial production by European art director Federico Pallavicini (né Federico von Berzeviczy-Pallavicini) but also because of its lavish production. It was the resulting cost of production that killed the magazine, since the expensive special costs (for cover cut-outs for some issues, for example) could not be supported in the long run. This magazine is now sought after by collectors and sells for significant amounts on eBay.

Contributors included W. H. Auden, Simone de Beauvoir, Winston Churchill, Jean Cocteau, Salvador Dalí (The Gypsy Angels Of Spain), Lucian Freud, Clare Boothe Luce, Ogden Nash, Saul Steinberg, Rufino Tamayo, Tennessee Williams, and Angus Wilson.

In later decades, Cowles served on various government committees, such as writing speeches for the War Production Board, and represented Dwight D. Eisenhower at the coronation of Elizabeth II. She was a member of the Founding Council of the Rothermere American Institute at Oxford University. In 1996, the book The Best of Flair collected much of the material from the magazine she founded.

Fleur Cowles' painting "Desert Journey" was reproduced as the cover of the 1968 Donovan album Donovan In Concert.

== Artwork ==
As Fleur Fenton Pettingell and Fleur Cowles Meyer, she worked as a painter and illustrator. She also designed tapestries, accessories, and china for Denby Ltd.

== Death ==
Fleur Fenton Cowles died on June 5, 2009, at a nursing home in Sussex, England, aged 101.

== Bibliography ==
- Cowles, Fleur. All Too True: Twenty-Nine True Stories That Might Have Been Invented. Quartet Books, Ltd. ISBN 978-0-7043-2327-8
- Cowles, Fleur. An Artist's Journey. Collins. ISBN 978-0-00-215083-5
- Cowles, Fleur. The Best of Flair. Scriptum Editions. ISBN 978-1-902686-07-3
- Cowles, Fleur. The Best of Flair. Rizzoli Intl Pubns. ISBN 978-0-8478-2229-4
- Cowles, Fleur. The Best of Flair. HarperCollins Canada, Ltd. ISBN 978-0-06-017390-6
- Cowles, Fleur & De Campo, Brooke. Bright Young Things: London. Perseus Distribution Services. ISBN 978-2-84323-337-1
- Cowles, Fleur & Conder, Susan. Flower Decorations: A New Approach to Flower Arranging. Octopus Publishing Group. ISBN 978-1-85029-028-5
- Cowles, Fleur & Conder, Susan. Flower Decorations: A New Approach to Flower Arranging. Random House Publishing Group. ISBN 978-0-394-54473-1
- Cowles, Fleur. The Flower Game. HarperCollins Publishers, Ltd. ISBN 978-0-00-216625-6
- Cowles, Fleur. The Flower Game. W. Morrow. ISBN 978-0-688-02055-2
- Cowles, Fleur. Friends & Memories. Random House. ISBN 978-0-224-01140-2
- Cowles, Fleur. Friends & Memories. Reynal. ISBN 978-0-688-61200-9
- Cowles, Fleur. The Case of Salvador Dali. Heinemann, 1959.
- Cowles, Fleur. If I Were an Animal. Morrow. ISBN 978-0-688-06150-0
- Cowles, Fleur. The Life and Times of the Rose. Orion Books Ltd. ISBN 978-1-85592-533-5
- Cowles, Fleur. The Life and Times of the Rose: An Essay on Its History With Many of the Author's Own Paintings. HarperCollins. ISBN 978-0-688-12082-5
- Cowles, Fleur & Vavra, Robert. Lion and Blue. Collins. ISBN 978-0-00-211495-0
- Cowles, Fleur & Vavra, Robert. Lion and Blue. HarperCollins. ISBN 978-0-688-61164-4
- Cowles, Fleur & Vavra, Robert. The Love of Tiger Flower. HarperCollins Publishers Ltd. ISBN 978-0-00-216208-1
- Cowles, Fleur & Conder, Susan. The New Guide to Flower Arranging. Octopus Publishing Group. ISBN 978-1-85029-182-4
- Cowles, Fleur. People as Animals. R. Clark. ISBN 978-0-86072-094-2
- Cowles, Fleur & Vavra, Robert. Romany Free. Granite Impex Ltd. ISBN 978-0-688-61193-4
- Cowles, Fleur & Vavra, Robert. Romany Free. HarperCollins Publishers Ltd. ISBN 978-0-00-216725-3
- Cowles, Fleur & Fuentes, Carlos. She Made Friends and Kept Them. HarperCollins Canada, Ltd. ISBN 978-0-00-255689-7
- Cowles, Fleur & Fuentes, Carlos. She Made Friends and Kept Them: An Anecdotal Memoir. HarperCollins Canada. ISBN 978-0-06-095505-2
- Cowles, Fleur & Fuentes, Carlos. She Made Friends and Kept Them: An Anecdotal Memoir. HarperCollins. ISBN 978-0-06-018713-2
- Cowles, Fleur & Vavra, Robert. To Be a Unicorn. HarperCollins Publishers Ltd. ISBN 978-0-00-217959-1
- Cowles, Fleur & Vavra, Robert. To Be a Unicorn. HarperCollins Publishers. ISBN 978-0-688-06598-0
