= The Beefeaters =

Danish garage rock band

The Beefeaters

The Beefeaters were a Danish garage rock band active from 1964 to 1971. A precursor to this band was formed in Copenhagen in early 1964, but their strong orientation towards blues-rock began only with the arrival of Peter Thorup in 1966. In 1967, The Beefeaters played as support band for Jimi Hendrix, John Mayall and Pink Floyd during their concerts in Denmark.

The Beefeaters produced two albums: Beefeaters (1967) and Meet You There (1969). Both albums were top-notch "real" blues-rock efforts to file along albums by John Mayall, early Fleetwood Mac and even Cuby & The Blizzards. The first album was, along with Steppeulvene's Hip, among the most important Danish albums of 1967. The Beefeaters weren't entirely blues purists either, displaying both beat and soul influences. The sound (very well developed for 1967) was largely based on Thorup's talents as vocalist and guitarist, but Kjærumsgård's Farfisa organ (sometimes replaced by piano) obviously augmented the group’s sound. Burnin' Red Ivanhoe was one of many groups which later copied this distinctive organ sound. In 1969, Povl Dissing left the group, which continued for a while longer with Ole Fick (from Burnin' Red Ivanhoe) as their lead singer. The post-Dissing group recorded the soundtrack to Jesper Høm's 1969 film Smil Emil, but no further vinyl output emerged.

== Albums ==
=== Beefeaters (1967) ===
Beefeaters (1967) album cover artwork

Beefeaters is the group's first album, released in 1967.

Track Listing

1. "It Ain't Necessarily So" (3:54)
2. "Crossroads" (2:31)
3. "My Babe" (3:35)
4. "I Want You" (3:40)
5. "Hey Little Girl" (2:18)
6. "Papa's Got a Brand New Bag" (3:29)
7. "Let Me Down Easy" (3:41)
8. "Shakin' Fingerpop" (2:50)
9. "Night Flight" (3:19)
10. "Summer Scene" (4:29)

=== Meet You There (1969) ===
Meet You There (1969) album cover artwork

Meet You There is the group's second album, released in 1969.

Track listing

1. "I'll Meet You There" (4:51)
2. "You Changed My Way of Living" (4:13)
3. "Night Train" (4:26)
4. "Now I Know" (4:55)
5. "Serenade to a Cuckoo" (10:02)
6. "Stormy Monday" (9:56)

== Personnel ==
- Peter Thorup - guitars, vocals, flute
- Morten Kjjærumsgård - organ, piano
- Keith Volkersen - bass
- Max Nhuthzhi - drums
- Alexis Korner - guitar, vocals
