= Overdrive Live! =

Overdrive Live

Live album by The Blues Overdrive
- Released: 2017
- Genre: Blues
- Label: Gateway Music TBO-150517
- Producer: The Blues Overdrive

The Blues Overdrive chronology
Clinch! (2015)	Overdrive Live (2017)

Overdrive Live! is a 2017 album for Danish blues band The Blues Overdrive. It was their third release and was received quite well.

== Background ==
The third release for Blues Overdrive, it was recorded live in 2016 at the Smukfest Festival.

All but two of the songs were written by Martin Olsen. The two non-Olsen compositions are "High Water (For Charley Patton)" by Bob Dylan and "You Got the Power to Turn Me On", a Chambers Brothers song that was composed by Willie Chambers. "You've Got the Power to Turn Me On" was a song that Peter Thorup would often play live. Thorup was an influence on the band.

The album runs for 42 minutes and 45 seconds.

== Critical reception ==
The 13 September 2017 review by Rock Times was good but it did mention some shortcomings. One of them was the album's length, but as a document of the band in concert, it can still be recommended.

The 16 October 2017 review from Bman's Blues Report was positive with the reviewer calling the album really solid.

The 16 November 2017 review by Heinz W. Arnd of Rockblog Blues Spot mentioned the band's ability to handle to the material confidently and the band played as if they were ordained by a higher power to be congenial reincarnations of J.J. Cale.

Michael Koenig of Hooked on Music called the album a truly fantastic live album, saying that the only drawback was the shortness of it.

The album received a positive review in the 2 March 2018 issue of Blues Blast Magazine, with the reviewer calling the album "a fine recording of a very impressive blues band in concert". The reviewer also finished off with informing the reader that Overdrive Live! was great stuff and one couldn't start at a better place for an introduction to the band.

== Track listing ==
Overdrive Live!, Gateway Music TBO-150517
No.	Track	Composer	Time
01	"Death On the Highway"	Martin Olsen	
02	"Three Time Lover"	Martin Olsen	
03	"Ball & Chain"	Martin Olsen	
04	"High Water (For Charley Patton)"	Bob Dylan	
05	" Everybody Was Rocking"	Martin Olsen	
06	"Mr. 16 Tons (Blues for Thorup)"	Martin Olsen	
07	"You Got the Power to Turn Me On"	Willie Chambers	
08	"Cherry"	Martin Olsen	
09	"I Was Wrong"	Martin Olsen	

== Personnel ==
Credits
Name	Role
Andreas Andersen	guitar
Thomas Birck aka Brother Birck	bass, backing vocals
Louisian Boltner	drums
Martin Olsen	vocals, guitar
