= Clinch! =

CLINCH!

Studio album by The Blues Overdrive
- Released: 26 May 2015
- Studio: Cherry Recording Studios, Copenhagen, Denmark
- Genre: Blues
- Label: Gateway Music TB0-030515
- Producer: The Blues Overdrive

The Blues Overdrive chronology
The Blues Overdrive (2012)	CLINCH! (2015)	Overdrive Live! (2017)

Clinch! is a 2015 album by Danish blues band The Blues Overdrive. The album was received well in the blues and blues-rock circles. Musicians Joel Paterson and Duke Robillard appear on the album.

== Background ==
Clinch! is a follow up to the Blues Overdrive's 2912 debut album. It is a ten-track album by the Blues Overdrive that was released on 26 May 2015. It was recorded at Cherry Recording Studios in Copenhagen, Denmark. The band members that played on the album were, Martin Olsen on vocals and guitar, Andreas Andersen on guitar, Thomas Birck on bass and Lars Heiberg on drums and percussion. The album also featured two guest musicians, guitarist Duke Robillard and lap steel guitarist Joel Peterson.

== Reception ==
The Allan E. Petersen of Rootzone was published on 11 July, 2015. It was positive with Petersen saying that the album rocked solidly and infectiously with ten English-language, self-written songs. He also said that it had stylish instrumental mastery. However, he was not impressed with the Americanization of the words and cliches that were rolled out.

The album received a positive review by Rocktimes which was published on 28 July 2015. The reviewer said that the album was mixin elements from the classic Chicago blues to trance-like and hypnotic delta grooves. The reviewer also said that the album was very well done, and the group set in motion a carousel of 12-bar variations that didn't revolve around funk, R&B, or soul. It was rather revolving around trance and hypnotic sounds.

The album was given four-out of six stars by Gaffa in the magazine's 20 August 2015 review.

The 18 September review by Dutch publication Blues Magazine was Luke-warm with the reviewer calling the songs no-nonsense but more of a developed idea than a finished composition. The band was also said to have a soft spot for J.J. Cale.

The 12 November 2015 review by Get Ready to Rock was positive. Reviewer Pete Feenstra said that it was enjoyable album that is only a few songs short of being an exemplar of minimalist blues. It was given four stars.

It was reviewed by a hora del blues in February 2016. In addition to calling the release an interesting album, the reviewer said that the group faithfully used the sound of the past and drove it to the future. They also cleverly and tastefully mixed "elements of classic Chicago blues with hypnotic Delta grooves".

== Track listing ==
Clich!, Gateway Music TB0-030515
No.	Track	Composer	Time	Notes
01	"Pistol Blues"	Martin Olsen	3:48	
02	"Rolling Thunder"	Martin Olsen	3:27	
03	"Three Times Lover"	Martin Olsen	3:22	Featuring Duke Robillard on guitar
04	"Woman of Love"	Martin Olsen	3:44	
05	"Daughter of the Devil"	John Németh	4:10	Featuring Duke Robillard on guitar
06	"Jealous"	Martin Olsen	3:08	
07	"Cherry"	Martin Olsen	3:59	Featuring Joel Paterson on lap steel guitar
08	"Lay Your Burdon Down"	Martin Olsen	6:16	
09	"Living Here with You"	Martin Olsen	4:28	
10	"Aurora"	Martin Olsen	3:59	

== Personnel ==
Credits
Name	Role
Andreas Andersen	guitar
Thomas Birck	bass, resonator guitar
Lars Heiberg	drums, percussion, mixing
Martin Olsen	vocals, guitar
Jan Eliasson	mastering
Dennis McGraw	artwork
Frank Nielsen	photography
Kristian Gadegaard Petersen	mixing
The Blues Overdrive	producer
