= Donovan in Concert =

Live album by Donovan
- Released: June 1968 (U.S.)
- Recorded: 17 November 1967
- Venue: Anaheim Convention Center
- Genre: Folk rock, psychedelic rock
- Length: 55:00
- Label: Epic (U.S.); Pye (UK)
- Producer: Mickie Most

Donovan chronology
| A Gift from a Flower to a Garden (1967) | Donovan in Concert (1968) | The Hurdy Gurdy Man (1968) |

Professional ratings
Review scores
| Source | Rating |
|---|---|
| Allmusic | 4.5/5 stars |
| Amazon.com | |

Donovan in Concert is the sixth album from Scottish singer-songwriter Donovan, and the first live album of his career. It was recorded at the Anaheim Convention Center in Anaheim, California on 17 November 1967 during a lengthy North American tour, his first there since April 1966. It was released in the United States in June 1968 (Epic Records BN 26386 (stereo)) and in the United Kingdom in September 1968 (Pye Records NPL 18237 (monaural) / NSPL 18237 (stereo)). The album reached No. 18 on the US charts, his fourth top 20 album in a row in that country.

== History ==
This concert was recorded prior to Donovan's release of A Gift from a Flower to a Garden, and included several songs that would not have been widely known to a US audience, including some which were UK single b-sides. "Poor Cow" is introduced by Donovan as "Poor Love", its original title, which was changed when the song appeared in the film Poor Cow. It retained that title when released as the b-side to "Jennifer Juniper" in February 1968. Another new song introduced on the album as "Pebble and the Man" would be recorded as "Happiness Runs" and appear on 1969's Barabajagal. On the live version of the song, Donovan asks the audience to sing along with the chorus. This album would also mark the only appearance of the song "Rules and Regulations".

The music at the concert was much more subdued than Donovan's singles of the time. The singer was backed by the core group of musicians who had recorded with him on his previous albums including flautist Harold McNair and percussionist Tony Carr. They play many genres of music, from folk to jazz, occasionally joined by The Flower Quartet on strings. Several songs which featured only acoustic guitar on record, such as "Young Girl Blues", were given a full jazz backing while others like "Guinevere" which featured electric violin and sitar in the studio were conversely stripped down only to acoustic guitar. The concert was introduced by KRLA radio personality Rhett Walker, who then hands the proceedings to Donovan's father (and manager) Donald Leitch.

When reviewing Donovan's show at San Francisco's Winterland a week after the Anaheim concert, journalist Ralph J. Gleason remarked:

Donovan, of course, both in his lyrics and his music and, too, in the way in which he sings, is supremely lyrical. "My songs exist in the essence of silence" he told the Winterland audience as he waited for them to become quiet. And they became quiet, almost holding their breath in reverent attention as he sang. He is an extraordinary performer. The pageantry, the flowers (he throws them to the audience at the end, after a joyous "Mellow Yellow"), the incense, the long robes, are all effective but the musicianship is underneath and solid as a rock. He knows exactly what he is doing, he is show-wise to the nth degree. The songs themselves are artfully constructed with echoes of familiarity, “songs of the realm” in the Tolkian expression and articulating the "beginning of a new world."

== Album cover art ==
The album's front cover featured a painting titled "Desert Journey" by Fleur Cowles. The back featured a photo of Donovan in love beads and playing a recorder taken by Stephen Goldblatt, along with handwritten notes of his impression of the tour including a drawing of a small jet plane.

== Reissues ==
- On 15 February 2002 Beat Goes On Records reissued Donovan in Concert (BGOCD 90) on compact disc in the UK.
- In 2006 EMI reissued a 2-CD remastered version of the album Donovan in Concert – The Complete 1967 Anaheim Show (094635410020) in the UK.

== Track listing ==
=== Original album ===
Track number, title, length, and on which releases of the studio versions of each song appeared. Songs that were unreleased at the time of the concert are noted with an asterisk (*):

Side one All tracks by Donovan Leitch.

1. "Intro" – 3:25
2. "Isle of Islay"* – 4:21 (from A Gift from a Flower to a Garden, released December 1967)
3. "Young Girl Blues" – 6:09 (from Mellow Yellow, released February 1967)
4. "There Is a Mountain" – 3:04 (single, released August 1967)
5. "Poor Cow"* – 3:28 (b-side of "Jennifer Juniper" single, released February 1968)
6. "Celeste" – 5:15 (from Sunshine Superman, released August 1966)
7. "The Fat Angel" – 3:24 (from Sunshine Superman, released August 1966)
8. "Guinevere" – 2:42 (from Sunshine Superman, released August 1966)

Side two

1. "Widow with Shawl (A Portrait)"* – 3:34 (from A Gift from a Flower to a Garden, released December 1967)
2. "Preachin' Love" – 5:03 (b-side of "Epistle to Dippy" single, released January 1967)
3. "The Lullaby of Spring"* – 3:08 (from A Gift from a Flower to a Garden, released December 1967)
4. "Writer in the Sun" – 4:30 (from Mellow Yellow, released February 1967)
5. "Pebble and the Man"* – 3:10 (released as "Happiness Runs" on Barabajagal, August 1969)
6. "Rules and Regulations"* – 2:54 (no studio version released except a demo tape)
7. "Mellow Yellow" – 4:18 (single, released October 1966)

=== 2006 Reissue ===
==== Disc one ====
1. "Intro" – 3:25
2. "Isle of Islay" – 4:21
3. "Young Girl Blues" – 6:09
4. "There Is a Mountain" – 3:04
5. "Poor Love (Poor Cow)" – 3:28
6. "Sunny Goodge Street" – 3:13
7. "Celeste" – 5:15
8. "The Fat Angel" – 3:24
9. "Guinevere" – 3:39
10. "Widow with Shawl (A Portrait)" – 3:00
11. "Epistle to Derroll" – 5:53
12. "Preachin' Love" – 9:38

==== Disc two ====
1. "Lullaby of Spring" – 4:27
2. "Sand and Foam" – 3:21
3. "Hampstead Incident" – 5:10
4. "Writer in the Sun" – 4:11
5. "Try for the Sun" – 3:27
6. "Someone Singing" – 2:55
7. "Pebble and the Man (Happiness Runs)" – 3:10
8. "The Tinker and the Crab" – 3:38
9. "Rules and Regulations" – 2:33
10. "Mellow Yellow" – 4:42
11. "Catch the Wind" (part) – 1:16

== Personnel ==
- Donovan – Guitar, Harmonica, Vocals
- Tony Carr – Percussion
- Harold McNair – Flute & sax
- David Troncoso – Bass
- Lorin Newkirk – Piano
- 'Candy' John Carr – Bongos & finger cymbals
- and The Flower Quartet

== Charts ==
| Chart (1968) | Peak position |
|---|---|
| US Billboard Top LPs | 18 |
| US Cashbox Top 100 Albums | 14 |
| CAN RPM Top Albums | 30 |
