= The Party Album (Alexis Korner album) =

Live album by Alexis Korner
- Released: 1980
- Recorded: April 19, 1978
- Venues: Pinewood Studios, Iver Heath, England
- Genres: Jazz, Blues
- Length: 64:28
- Label: Universal Music
- Producer: Alexis Korner

Alexis Korner chronology
Just Easy (1978)	The Party Album (1980)	Me (1980)

Professional ratings
Review scores
Source	Rating
The Penguin Guide to Blues Recordings	2.5/4 stars

The Party Album, also known as The Party LP, is a 1978 live blues recording by Alexis Korner. The double album features Alexis Korner and various guest musicians singing a mix of both classic blues songs as well as some of Korner's own. The concert was a celebration of Korner's 50th birthday.

The album was originally released in 1980 and re-released in 1993.

== Track listing ==
1. “Things Ain't What They Used to Be” (Mercer Ellington) – 7:23
2. “Captain's Tiger” (Alexis Korner) – 3:30
3. “Skipping” (Korner) – 3:10
4. “Spoonful” (Willie Dixon) – 6:40
5. Medley – 9:06
  1. “Finkles Cafe” (Korner)
  2. “Dooji Hooji” (Duke Ellington)
6. “Whole Mess of Blues” (Doc Pomus, Mort Shuman) – 5:36
7. “Lining Track” (Huddie Ledbetter) – 3:15
8. “Robert Johnson” (Korner, J. Edwards) – 6:15
9. “Hey Pretty Mama” (Chris Farlowe) – 4:19
10. “Hi-Heel Sneakers” (Robert Higginbotham) – 9:15
11. “Stormy Monday Blues” (Billy Eckstein, Earl Hines) – 5:59

== Personnel ==
=== Musicians ===
- Alexis Korner – vocals, electric guitar, acoustic guitar, cowbell/backing vocals
- Zoot Money – electric piano, vocals, backing vocals, tambourine
- Mel Collins – tenor saxophone, soprano saxophone
- Dick Heckstall-Smith – tenor saxophone
- Art Themen – tenor saxophone
- Dick Morrissey – tenor saxophone
- John Surman – baritone saxophone, soprano saxophone
- Mike Zwerin – trombone
- Sappho Gillet – tambourine/backing vocals
- Chris Farlowe – vocals, tambourine
- Eric Clapton – electric guitar
- Colin Hodgkinson – bass guitar
- Stu Speer – drums
- Duffy Power – harmonica
- Paul Jones – harmonica
- Neil Ford – electric guitar

=== Technical ===
- Alexis Korner – producer
- Damian Korner – assistant producer, engineer
- Andy Jackson, Pete Walsh, Gordon Vicary, Mike Robinson – assistant engineers
