= Tap Turns on the Water =

Single by C.C.S.
- B-side: "Save the World"
- Released: 1971
- Label: Rak
- Songwriters: Alexis Korner, John Cameron
- Producer: Mickie Most

C.C.S. singles chronology
"Walking" (1971)	"Tap Turns on the Water" (1971)	"Brother" (1972)

"Tap Turns on the Water" is a song and single by British band, C.C.S. Written by band leader Alexis Korner and John Cameron, it was first released in the UK in 1971.

== Background and chart success ==
The song was the third UK Top 20 hit for C.C.S. and their most successful. It reached number five in the UK Singles Chart in September 1971 and remained in the chart for 15 weeks. On the New Zealand Listener charts it reached number 12.

The song was choreographed for BBC dance troupe Pan's People at Kempton Park pumping station.

The lyrics for the song were also adapted to be used as a football song by the supporters of Bristol Rovers.
