= Iberia (book) =

1968 book by James A. Michener

- First edition
- Author: James A. Michener
- Language: English
- Publisher: Random House
- Publication date: 1968
- Publication place: United States
- Media type: print
- Pages: 818 pp.
- ISBN: 0-394-42982-6

Iberia, by James A. Michener (original title: Iberia: Spanish Travels and Reflections, subtitled Photographs by Robert Vavra), is an illustrated travel book published in April 1968 that details the author's exploration of Spain as it was in the decades leading up to the mid-1960s. In researching the book, Michener visited Spain numerous times over a period of 40 years, also referring to it as his "second home".

== Chapters ==
1. Introduction
2. Badajoz
3. Toledo
4. Cordoba
5. Las Marismas
6. Sevilla
7. Madrid
8. Salamanca
9. Pamplona
10. Barcelona
11. The Bulls
12. Teruel
13. Santiago de Compostela
- Index

== Themes ==
Michener takes a measured, literary view on such subjects as the Moorish occupation, Islam, Catholicism, Francisco Franco, bullfighting, and other controversial themes.

Michener shows to be very prescient, as in his talk of national cycles of rebirth (p. 837): "And one of these days, (change) will be true even of Russia, and we had better be prepared to admit it ... though (in the United States) we fight against it and blind our eye and conscience to the fact".
