= The Blues Overdrive =

- Also known as: Martin Olsens Blues Overdrive, Blues Overdrive
- Genres: Blues, rock
- Years active: 2000 - present
- Label: Gateway Music
- Website: https://bluesoverdrive.com/

The Blues Overdrive is a Danish blues band.

Competing at the Mojo Blues Bar in Copenhagen in 2003, the group won the 25-year Anniversary Blues Competition.

As of 2015, the band consisted of Martin Olsen on vocals and guitar, Andreas Andersen on lead guitar, Thomas Birck on bass and Louisian Boltner on drums.

== Career ==
The German music magazine Wasser Prawda had the group's debut album as its album of the year.

In 2015, the group released their Clinch! album. It featured guest musician, Joel Patterson on lap steel, on the track "Cherry". Guitarist Duke Robillard also guested on two tracks. Also that year, the album was one of the five DMA nominated albums.

In 2017, the group released Overdrive Live!, their third album, on Gateway Music. It was reviewed in the 2 March 2018 issue of Blues Blast magazine. Rhys Williams said that it was a fine recording of a very impressive blues in concert. All but two of the tracks were composed by Martin Olsen. The two other tracks were, "High Water (For Charley Patton)" by Bob Dylan and "You Got the Power to Turn Me On" by The Chambers Brothers. "You Got the Power to Turn Me On", which was written by Willie Chambers, was often performed by Peter Thorup.

The group was performing a concert on 23 June 2024 as part of the Sonntags ans Schloss events.

== Discography ==
Albums
| Release | Catalogue | Year |
|---|---|---|
| The Blues Overdrive | Gateway Music TBO010312 | 2012 |
| Clinch! | Gateway Music TB0-030515 | 2015 |
| Overdrive Live! | Gateway Music TBO-150517 | 2017 |

Various artists
| Title | Song | Catalogue | Year | Notes |
|---|---|---|---|---|
| The Copenhagen Blues Sessions Vol. 2 (The Blues Bands) | "Feelin' Kind of Blue" | CBFCD-2-04 | 2004 | Band credited as Martin Olsens Blues Overdrive |
| Bluesnews Collection Vol. 10 | "Woman of Love" | BluesNews CD bncvol10 | 2015 | |
| Music from Denmark 2005 | "Feelin' Kind of Blue" | MXP MXPDVD0105 | 2015 | Band credited as Martin Olsen, Blues Overdrive; DVD |
