= A Gift from a Flower to a Garden =

A Gift From a Flower to a Garden

Studio album by Donovan
- Released: December 1967
- Genre: Psychedelic pop; folk
- Length: 59:54 (total); 23:45 (Wear Your Love Like Heaven); 36:09 (For Little Ones)
- Label: Pye; Epic
- Producer: Donovan (uncredited); Mickie Most

Donovan chronology
Mellow Yellow (1967)	A Gift From a Flower to a Garden (1967)	Donovan in Concert (1968)

Singles from A Gift From a Flower to a Garden
- 1. "Wear Your Love Like Heaven" b/w "Oh Gosh!" Released: November 1967 (US)

Wear Your Love Like Heaven

For Little Ones

A Gift From a Flower to a Garden is the fifth studio album from Scottish singer-songwriter Donovan, released in December 1967 through Pye Records in the UK and Epic Records in the US. It marks the first double-disc album of Donovan's career and one of the first box sets in pop music. In the US, Epic also released the two discs separately as the stand-alone albums Wear Your Love Like Heaven and For Little Ones.

A Gift from a Flower to a Garden spent 14 weeks on the UK albums chart, peaking at number 13. In the US, it spent 22 weeks on the US Billboard 200, peaking at number 19. In 1970, the album earned a Gold Record award for half a million sales.

== Background ==
After recording the Mellow Yellow album, Donovan focused on releasing hit singles. "Epistle to Dippy" (essentially an inside-joke/open letter for a childhood friend) hit the US top 20 in February 1967 and "There Is a Mountain" (No. 11 US; No. 8 UK) followed in August.

Riding high on the success of these singles, Donovan planned an album consisting of stripped-down acoustic children's music inspired by his spring 1967 move to Buck's Alley Cottage in Hertfordshire, where he had been writing songs celebrating its natural beauty. When he proposed the album to producer Mickie Most that August, Most did not find the project viable, which led to a temporary parting of ways between the two. As a result, Donovan decided to produce the album himself.

== Songs and recording ==
Donovan had been writing and saving a number of songs over the past 18 months with a pastoral acoustic feel. "Sand and Foam" had been among the first of these, which had recently seen release on Mellow Yellow. Other songs included "Voyage into the Golden Screen", written on the same spring 1966 trip to Mexico that had produced "Sand and Foam"; "Isle of Islay", penned on a summer 1966 trip to the Scottish isle of its title following his drug bust; "The Tinker and The Crab", first introduced during concerts in late 1966 and announced as the singer's next single in a March 1967 issue of New Musical Express, although this plan was scrapped; and "Lay of the Last Tinker", performed along with the previous three songs at the singer's acclaimed Royal Albert Hall show in January 1967. More songs followed after the singer moved to Buck's Alley Cottage in the spring of 1967, including "The Lullaby of Spring", "Song of the Naturalist's Wife" and "The Magpie", the latter a tribute to the many magpie birds which flew and congregated around the cottage. Another composition, "Epistle to Derroll", was a tribute to the singer and banjo player Derroll Adams who Donovan had befriended in his early folk days.

On August 16, Donovan's child Donovan Jerome was born. The newborn baby's cries opened the children's record, eventually titled For Little Ones, which was recorded at CBS Studios in London during the first two weeks of September 1967. The sessions were entirely produced by Donovan and allowed him to present a facet of his songwriting that had not been featured on his singles. It also allowed him to show his strength as a guitar player and performer in a way that he could not when augmented by session musicians. In fact, Donovan's live shows of the time, as documented on 1968's Donovan in Concert, featured instrumentation and performances more in line with For Little Ones than his hit singles.

Soon after the children's album was recorded, Donovan decided to record an additional disc of acoustic and electric music for adults, with most of its songs backed by a small jazz-pop combo of electric guitar, bass, drums, and keyboards. Sessions were held sporadically in September and October between North American tour dates and included "Mad John's Escape", a song written for a friend of Donovan's who had escaped from a borstal that recounted his subsequent adventures. Another track titled "Under the Greenwood Tree" stemmed from actor Laurence Olivier asking the singer to compose melodies for Olivier's adaptation of Shakespeare's As You Like It at the National Theatre. At the end of the song, Donovan sings "Will you, won't you... join the dance?" in reference to the chorus of "The Lobster Quadrille" in Chapter X of Lewis Carroll's Alice's Adventures in Wonderland.

When Donovan approached CBS Records executive Clive Davis with the idea for the double album, Davis was not willing to release the record unless the singer repaired his relationship with Mickie Most; he also thought there were no potential hit singles on the album and urged that Most help in that area. Donovan did as asked and brought Most in to produce the final two songs on the album, "Wear Your Love Like Heaven" and "Oh Gosh". "Wear Your Love Like Heaven" eventually gave the "for adults" disc its title and was released as the album's lead single in America. Its name-check of exotic colors was inspired by Donovan's love of painting and was intended as his hope that his generation would spread love and compassion throughout the globe. Although Most had only produced these final two tracks, Donovan allowed him a producer credit for the whole album to help sales.

In the album's liner notes, Donovan explained his purpose in creating two rather different discs (one for the present generation, and the other for the "dawning generation"), and also denounced the use of drugs. Several of his earlier records had contained both veiled and open references to drug use (particularly marijuana and LSD), but since the release of Mellow Yellow, he had both been arrested and prosecuted for marijuana possession, and had seen people he knew turning to harder drugs (speed, heroin, cocaine), and bemoaned the damage this caused in their lives. Instead, Donovan promoted the use of meditation and other techniques in his new songs.

== Album cover and artwork ==
A Gift From a Flower to a Garden appeared in an elaborate box set package which included both discs, along with a series of 12 A4 sheets of special coloured paper with drawings by friends Mick Taylor and Sheena McCall illustrating the lyrics to the songs on the children's record. When Donovan presented the package to Clive Davis, he was told it was far too expensive, usually reserved only for classical records, and would only allow it if Donovan paid for the extra costs of the package himself.

The front cover photo design of the album features a Pre-Raphaelite style infrared photograph (requiring seven colour separations for printing, instead of the usual four) of Donovan posing by the cliffs of Cornwall in a full robe and makeup, holding flowers in one hand and peacock feathers in another. On the inside of the box was another infrared picture of the artist in a boat on the moat in front of Bodiam Castle. The back cover photo was taken in Los Angeles during Donovan's initiation into Transcendental Meditation, and depicted Donovan visiting with Maharishi Mahesh Yogi. All three of the album package photographs were taken by Karl Ferris, who was his and Jimi Hendrix's personal photographer and was also initiated into TM on the same day.

== Release ==
Clive Davis would not allow the full double album package to be released unless it was also split into two separate records, Wear Your Love Like Heaven and For Little Ones, for simultaneous release by Epic Records in the United States. Meanwhile, the double album set was released in the US (Epic Records L2N 6071 (monaural) / B2N 171 (stereo)) in December 1967 and in the UK ((Pye Records NPL 20000 (monaural) / NSPL 20000 (stereo)) on April 16, 1968. While Wear Your Love Like Heaven could only chart at number 60 on the Billboard 200 and For Little Ones struggled to reach number 185, A Gift From a Flower to a Garden spent 22 weeks on the US Billboard 200, peaking at number 19, while peaking at number 13 during a 14-week stay on the UK chart.

== Reception ==
Professional ratings
Review scores
Source	Rating
AllMusic (original double album)	4.5/5 stars
AllMusic (for Wear Your Love Like Heaven)	4.5/5 stars
AllMusic (for For Little Ones)	3/5 stars
MusicHound	3/5 stars
The Rolling Stone Album Guide	3.5/5 stars
Encyclopedia of Popular Music	3/5 stars

Upon release, Melody Maker enthused that "lyrics which might seem mawkish in the hands of a more earthy performer come across with extraordinary charm, assisted by a seemingly endless flow of pretty melodies". In the US, Billboard opined "his poetry, clipped lamenting voice and fable-like simplicity are hypnotic" while Cashbox hailed the album as "a feast for the eyes in spectacular packaging, ears in delicate and moving songs, and mind through tantalizing lyrics and melodic weavings".

Retrospectively, AllMusic stated that the album "stands out as a prime artifact of the flower-power era that produced it," and noted that while "the music still seems a bit fey ... the sheer range of subjects and influences make this a surprisingly rewarding work." The New Rolling Stone Album Guide wrote that the album "delivered the Donovan persona to the max--a troubadour Saint Francis who filled his lyrics with exotic poetry that promoted a bliss straight out of William Blake's Songs of Innocence.

The Quietus noted of For Little Ones that "the words aren't patronising, dumbed down, or tailored to what adult writers think children either want to hear or should be told...The music is gentle enough for the album to work as a collection of lullabies, but the main reason these are songs aimed at "the dawning generation" is that they take the form of fables and fairy tales, of the kind common to both the 19th century folk revival and the Victorian children's literature of the same period: a canon with a unique combination of faded innocence and haunted strangeness that the psychedelic songwriters of the 60s saw as a rich well to draw from."

== Track listing ==
All tracks are written by Donovan Leitch, except "Under the Greenwood Tree" (words by William Shakespeare, music by Leitch).

Wear Your Love Like Heaven – side one
No.	Title	Length
1.	"Wear Your Love Like Heaven"	2:30
2.	"Mad John's Escape"	2:16
3.	"Skip-a-Long Sam"	2:23
4.	"Sun"	3:13
5.	"There Was a Time"	1:59
Total length:		12:21

Wear Your Love Like Heaven – side two
No.	Title	Length
1.	"Oh Gosh"	1:42
2.	"Little Boy in Corduroy"	2:33
3.	"Under the Greenwood Tree"	1:53
4.	"The Land of Doesn't Have to Be"	2:32
5.	"Someone's Singing"	2:44
Total length:		11:24

For Little Ones – side one
No.	Title	Length
1.	"Song of the Naturalist's Wife"	2:53
2.	"The Enchanted Gypsy"	3:19
3.	"Voyage into the Golden Screen"	3:12
4.	"Isle of Islay"	2:20
5.	"The Mandolin Man and His Secret"	3:32
6.	"Lay of the Last Tinker"	1:47
Total length:		17:03

For Little Ones – side two
No.	Title	Length
1.	"The Tinker and the Crab"	2:52
2.	"Widow with a Shawl (A Portrait)"	2:58
3.	"The Lullaby of Spring"	3:25
4.	"The Magpie"	1:27
5.	"Starfish-on-the-Toast"	2:39
6.	"Epistle to Derroll"	5:45
Total length:		19:06

== Personnel ==
- Donovan – vocals, guitar, banjo, harmonica, whistling
- Eric Leese – electric guitar
- Cliff Barton – bass
- Jack Bruce – bass on "Someone's Singing"
- Ken Baldock – double bass
- Mike O'Neill – keyboards
- Keith Webb – drums
- Tony Carr – drums, bells, congas, finger cymbals
- Mike Carr – vibraphone
- "Candy" John Carr – congas
- Harold McNair – flute

== Release history ==
Region	Date	Title	Label	Format	Catalog-Nr.
United States	12/1967	A Gift From a Flower to a Garden	Epic	mono LP	L2N6071
United States	12/1967	A Gift From a Flower to a Garden	Epic	stereo LP	B2N171
UK	16 April 1968	A Gift From a Flower to a Garden	Pye	mono LP	NPL20000
UK	16 April 1968	A Gift From a Flower to a Garden	Pye	stereo LP	NSPL 20000
United States	12/1967	Wear Your Love Like Heaven	Epic	monaural LP	LN 24349
United States	12/1967	Wear Your Love Like Heaven	Epic	stereo LP	BN 26349 (stereo)
United States	1/1968	For Little Ones	Epic	monaural LP	LN24350
United States	1/1968	For Little Ones	Epic	stereo LP	BN26350 (stereo)

=== Reissues ===
- In 1993, BGO Records reissued A Gift from a Flower to a Garden on compact disc in the UK. Mono and Stereo versions were issued. See Donovan - A Gift From A Flower To A Garden for details.
- On 12 September 2000, Collector's Choice Music reissued A Gift from a Flower to a Garden on compact disc in the US.
- On 16 January 2001, Collectables Records released Mellow Yellow/Wear Your Love Like Heaven (Collectables 6644), which contained all of Mellow Yellow and the Wear Your Love Like Heaven portion of A Gift from a Flower to a Garden.
- On 26 January 2009, EMI reissued A Gift from a Flower to a Garden, remastered, on compact disc with under a license agreement with Donovan.
- On 28 January 2022, The state51 Conspiracy released a remastered mono version of ‘’A Gift from a Flower to a Garden’’, as a double compact disc.

== Certifications ==
Region	Certification	Certified units/sales
United States (RIAA)	Gold	500,000^{^}
^{^} Shipments figures based on certification alone.
