= Tom Browne (broadcaster) =

British broadcaster and actor

- Born: 11 November 1945 (age 80); Lymington, Hampshire, England
- Occupations: Actor; DJ
- Years active: 1965–2003

Tom Browne (born 11 November 1945) is a British broadcaster and actor, born in Lymington, Hampshire, and educated at King's College School, Wimbledon.

== Career ==
=== Early film and acting career ===
As an actor, Browne graduated from RADA. He has appeared in several films, including Prudence and the Pill, Decline and Fall and The Vampire Lovers. He also performed throughout the UK in repertory theatres and in plays for both the BBC and ITV. He starred with Richard Todd in "The Winslow Boy" (1971) and then in "A Christmas Carol" also with Todd and Mervyn Johns.

=== Television ===
Browne also made appearances in the 1968 TV series Virgin of the Secret Service, The Queen Street Gang, The Prior Commitment, the 1971 TV series Hine, Budgie, and Whodunnit?. However, he is perhaps better known for his part as the Headmaster, James Bonfils, in Emmerdale Farm from November 1974 through to April 1975.

=== Early radio broadcasting and BBC Radio 1 career ===
Browne began his radio broadcasting career in Denmark in 1965. He married a Danish woman and moved to Chiswick in west London. In 1972 he was chosen by BBC producer Johnny Beerling to succeed Alan Freeman as presenter of the BBC Radio 1 Sunday afternoon chart show. He presented this show from 1 October 1972 to 26 March 1978. Initially the show ran for 3 hours from 4 pm–7 pm each Sunday called "Solid Gold Sixty", the first two hours being devoted to new releases and climbers on that week's Radio One playlist. "Solid Gold Sixty" ran from October 1972 to March 1974.

The first record that Tom Browne played on "Solid Gold 60" at 4.00 pm on Sunday 1 October 1972 was Honky Cat by Elton John. The first two hours were broadcast only on Radio 1's medium wave channel, which at that time was 247 metres (1215 kHz) although occasionally local radio stations broadcasting on FM in mono such as BBC Radio London (94.9 MHz) would carry the transmission from 4–6pm. The previous Sunday chart show, the long running Pick of the Pops with Alan Freeman, aired between 5–7 pm and was broadcast not just on 247m but Radio 2's FM and LW frequencies for the entire show, but the cancellation of Pick of the Pops, brought a change to the allocation of FM and LW airtime, with Radio 1 losing one of the hours of valuable FM and LW for its chart show, as they reverted to Radio 2. From the outset on 1 October 1972, Solid Gold 60's final hour was broadcast on FM and LW as well as on Radio 1 (247m). Twenty records were crammed into 60 minutes, plus a verbal countdown. The music used for the introduction of the Top 20 broadcast from 6pm to 7pm on BBC Radio 1, also using BBC Radio 2's FM transmitters on 88–91 MHz, was Brother by the band CCS.

At 7.00 pm, the VHF/FM (88–91 MHz) transmitters reverted to BBC Radio 2 only. The programme was listened to by millions and started with the sound of the Apollo mission's 'we have lift-off!' words. Sound effects, amongst many, included a racing car which indicated a record was rapidly moving up the top 20. Each chart position from 20 to number 1 had an individually numbered sung jingle which was played prior to each record. After the number 2 hit had finished playing, a further vocal run-down by Browne of numbers 20 down to 2 followed (with Browne's choice of background music) and then the number one record was announced and played which completed the programme. The chart was first broadcast (compiled by the British Market Research Bureau) on Johnnie Walker's programme the previous Tuesday (247 metres MW only) and played by Walker at that time. The music used for that rundown was Booker T. & the M.G.'s track, "Time is Tight".

In addition to the Sunday chart show on Radio 1, Browne also presented occasional music documentaries on the station, including on ABBA, Queen and The Stylistics. His smooth style and distinctive received pronunciation voice were unusual for Radio 1.

=== Later broadcasting career ===
After leaving Radio 1 he broadcast for BBC Radio 2 in the early 1980s and provided the voiceover for many TV and radio adverts. He subsequently became a newsreader for BBC World television and then moved to Hong Kong, where he became a popular broadcaster on the British Armed Forces radio service in the final years of British rule. His final appearance as a DJ on national BBC radio came at the very end of 1991, when he presented "The Million Selling Singles of the 60s and 70s" on BBC Radio 2, although he was a contributor to Radio 1's "25 Years of the UK Top 40", which aired in September 1992.

He hosted BFBS Radio Hong Kong's weekday breakfast show until the territory reverted to Chinese rule in 1997 and continued working in radio, as well as a commercial voice-over artist and freelance video presenter until 2005. In December 2023, Browne co-presented with Shaun Tilley on Boom Radio's programme Mister Top 20 – The Tom Browne Story.

Media offices
Preceded by Alan Freeman	BBC Radio 1 chart show presenter 1 October 1972 – 26 March 1978	Succeeded by Simon Bates
