= Run the Length of Your Wildness =

Studio album by Kathe Green
- Released: 1969
- Genre: Pop, rock
- Length: 33:56
- Label: Deram
- Producer: Wayne Bickerton

Kathe Green chronology
Run the Length of Your Wildness (1969)	Kathe Green (1976)

Professional ratings
Review scores
Source	Rating
Allmusic	link

Run the Length of Your Wildness is the first album by Kathe Green. It was originally released by Deram Records, a sister label to Decca Records.

Green wrote 10 of the album's 13 tracks. She was teamed up with in-house producer and head of A&R at Deram, Wayne Bickerton, arranger John Cameron and the cream of London session players. Four tracks were co-written with Liz Sacks. Cameron and Bickerton also provided material.

The album was housed in a striking sleeve which featured notes by Peter Sellers, Rex Harrison and Simon Dee.

== Track listing ==
All tracks composed by Kathe Green; except where indicated

1. "Primrose Hill" (Green, Liz Sacks) – 3:47
2. "Ring of String" – 3:25
3. "Only a Fool" (Jackie Lomax, Wayne Bickerton) – 2:17
4. "Why? (The Child's Song)" – 1:51
5. "Bossa Nova" – 1:53
6. "Tears in My Eyes" (Tony Waddington, Wayne Bickerton) – 3:04
7. "If I Thought You'd Ever Change Your Mind" (John Cameron) – 3:10
8. "Promise of Something New" (Green, Glenn Close) – 2:38
9. "Once There Was You" (Green, Liz Sacks) – 2:43
10. "Part of Yesterday" (Green, Liz Sacks) – 3:46
11. "I'll Never Forget" (John Cameron) – 2:54
12. "Run the Length of Your Wildness" (Green, Liz Sacks, John Cameron) – 5:16
13. "I Love You ('Though You Are Not Here)" (Green, Pat Lewis) – 0:43

== Personnel ==
- John Cameron - musical direction
- Derek Varnals - engineer
- Peter Rynston - assistant engineer
- Terence Ibbott - photography
