= Kathe Green =

American actress, model and singer (born 1944)

Kathe Jennifer Green (born September 22, 1944) is an American actress, model and singer. She is the daughter of composer and conductor Johnny Green and Bunny Waters. She has a younger sister, Kim Meglio.

== Early years ==
Born in Los Angeles, California, Kathe Green traveled for several years in the mid-to-late 1960s with the nonprofit encouragement singing group Up With People. During her time in Up With People, Kathe was part of a small singing group called the Green Glenn Singers, consisting of herself, Glenn Close, Jennie Dorn, and Vee Entwistle. The group's stated mission was "to write and sing songs which would give people a purpose and inspire them to live the way they were meant to live".

== Career ==
Green appeared in Blake Edwards's 1968 film The Party, and then dubbed all of Mark Lester's singing voice in Oliver!. She signed to Deram label and used a line of poetry bestowed on her by close friend Richard Harris as the title for her album Run the Length of Your Wildness. Released in 1969, it was a collaborative effort with orchestral arrangements handled by John Cameron and production by Wayne Bickerton. The album produced one single, Primrose Hill, released the same year on Deram.

In 1971 she recorded the song "Marianne", which was played over the opening credits to the film Die Screaming, Marianne, starring Susan George. Green recorded for the Motown label in the mid-1970s, but afterwards stepped away from the music business.

== Selected discography ==
=== Studio albums ===
- Run the Length of Your Wildness (Deram/Decca, 1969) (reissued on Rev-Ola)
- Kathe Green (Prodigal/Motown, 1976)

=== Singles ===
- Primrose Hill (Deram, 1969)
- Love City (Motown, 1975)
- Beautiful Changes (Motown, 1976)

== Selected filmography ==
- The Many Loves of Dobie Gillis "Who Needs Elvis?" (1960) as Esme Lauterbach
- The Party (1968) as Molly Clutterbuck
