= Alexis Korner =

British blues musician and radio broadcaster (1928–1984)

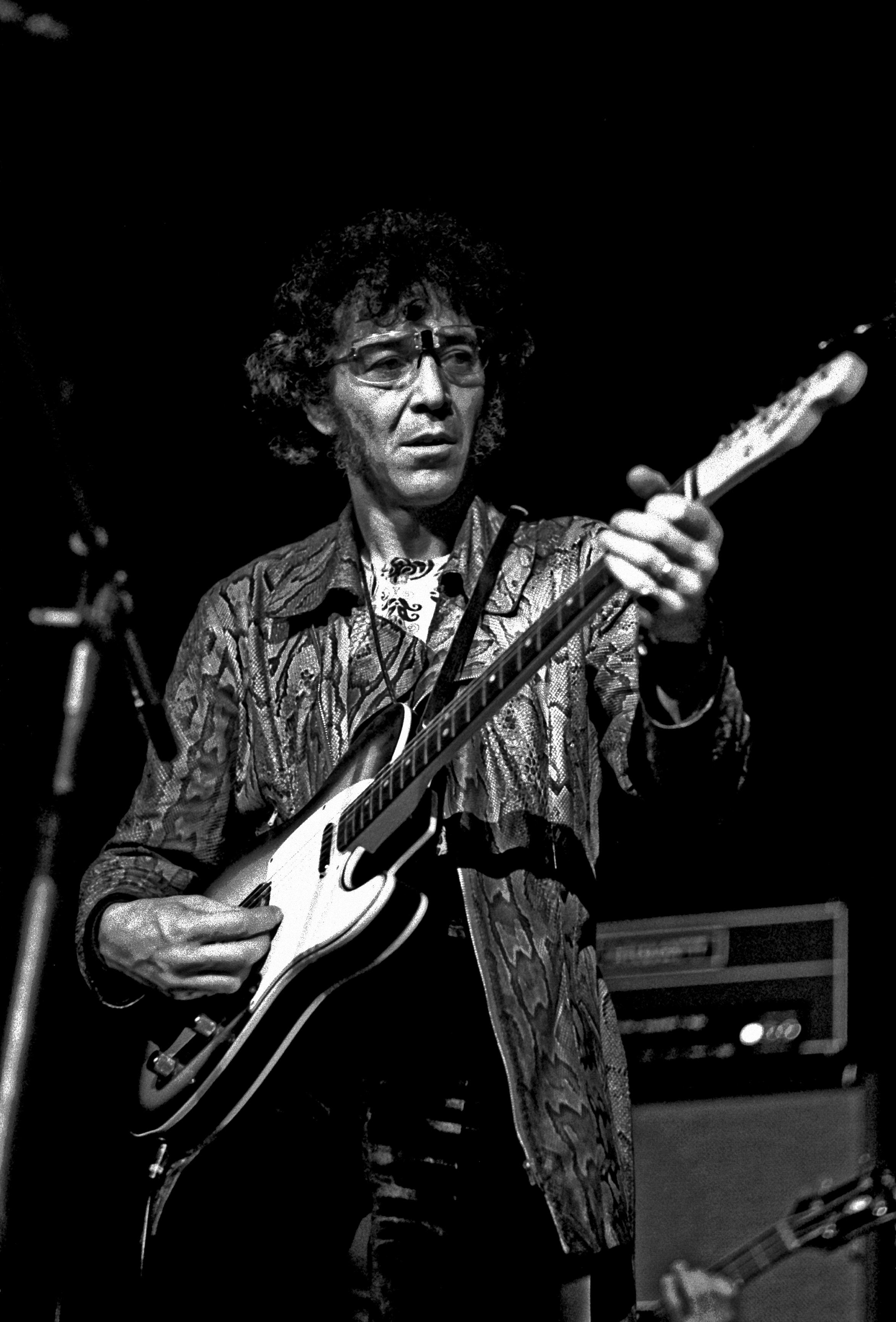
- Alexis Korner, Musikhalle Hamburg, November 1972

Background information
- Also known as: "Father of British Blues"
- Born: Alexis Andrew Nicholas Koerner; 19 April 1928; Paris, France
- Died: 1 January 1984 (aged 55) London, England
- Genres: Blues; blues rock
- Occupations: Musician, singer-songwriter, historian, broadcaster
- Instruments: Vocals, acoustic & electric guitar, mandolin, piano
- Years active: 1955–1984
- Labels: Decca, Polydor, Spot Records, CBS Records, Transatlantic Records, Fontana, RAK Records, Tempo, Brain Records, Liberty, Atlantic/Metronome, 77 Records, Warner Bros., Charisma
- Formerly of: Alexis Korner's Blues Incorporated, Free At Last, CCS, Snape

Alexis Andrew Nicholas Koerner (19 April 1928 – 1 January 1984), known professionally as Alexis Korner, was a British blues musician and radio broadcaster, who has sometimes been referred to as "a founding father of British blues". A major influence on the sound of the British music scene in the 1960s, he was instrumental in the formation of several notable British bands including the Rolling Stones and Free. Korner was inducted into the Rock and Roll Hall of Fame in the musical influence category in 2024.

== Early career ==
Alexis Andrew Nicholas Koerner was born on 19 April 1928 in Paris, France, to an Austrian Jewish father and a mother of Greek, Turkish and Austrian descent. He spent his childhood in France, Switzerland and North Africa, and arrived in London in 1940 after the start of the Second World War. One memory of his youth was listening to a record by black pianist Jimmy Yancey during a German air raid. Korner said, "From then on all I wanted to do was play the blues."

After the war, Korner played piano and guitar (his first guitar was built by friend and author Sydney Hopkins, who wrote Mister God, This Is Anna) and in 1949 joined Chris Barber's Jazz Band where he met blues harmonica player Cyril Davies. They started playing together as a duo, started the influential London Blues and Barrelhouse Club in 1955 and made their first record together in 1957.

Korner made his first official record on Decca Records DFE 6286 in the company of Ken Colyer's Skiffle Group. His talent extended to playing mandolin on one of the tracks of this British EP, recorded in London on 28 July 1955. Korner encouraged many American blues artists, previously virtually unknown in Britain, to perform at the London Blues and Barrelhouse Club, which he established with Davies at the Round House pub in Soho.

== The 1960s ==
In 1961, Korner and Davies formed Blues Incorporated, initially a loose-knit group of musicians with a shared love of electric blues and R&B music. The group included, at various times, Charlie Watts, Jack Bruce, Ginger Baker, Long John Baldry, Graham Bond, Danny Thompson and Dick Heckstall-Smith. It also attracted a wider crowd of mostly younger fans, some of whom occasionally performed with the group, including Mick Jagger, Keith Richards, Brian Jones, Eric Burdon, Geoff Bradford, Rod Stewart, John Mayall, and Jimmy Page. With Davies he co-founded Britain's first dedicated electric rhythm and blues club at the Ealing Jazz Club in 1962.

Although Cyril Davies left the group in late 1962, Blues Incorporated continued to record, with Korner at the helm, until 1966. However, by that time its originally stellar line-up (and crowd of followers) had mostly left to start their own bands. While his one-time acolytes, the Rolling Stones and Cream, made the front pages of music magazines all over the world, Korner was relegated to the role of 'elder statesman'.

In 1966, Korner formed the trio Free At Last with Hughie Flint and Binky McKenzie. Flint later recalled "I played with Alexis, right after leaving The Bluesbreakers, in a trio, which Alexis named Free At Last, a sort of mini and slightly restricted version of Blues Incorporated. Playing with Alexis was very loose. We would play anything from Percy Mayfield's ‘River's Invitation' to Charles Mingus' ‘Better Get It In Your Soul' – with lots of freaky guitar and bass solos. Alexis, like John Mayall had the most eclectic taste in music, very knowledgeable, and generous, and I am indebted to both of them for my wide approach to music".

Although Free At Last was short-lived, Korner ensured its name lived on in part by christening another young group of aspiring musicians, Free. Korner was instrumental in the formation of the band in April 1968, and continued to mentor them until they secured a deal with Island Records.

Although he himself was a blues purist, Korner criticised better-known British blues musicians during the blues boom of the late 1960s for their blind adherence to Chicago blues, as if the music came in no other form. He liked to surround himself with jazz musicians and often performed with a horn section drawn from a pool that included, among others, saxophone players Art Themen, Mel Collins, Dick Heckstall-Smith, and Lol Coxhill.

While touring Scandinavia he formed the band New Church with guitarist and singer Peter Thorup. They subsequently were one of the support bands at the Rolling Stones Free Concert in Hyde Park, London, on 5 July 1969. Jimmy Page reportedly found out about a new singer, Robert Plant, who had been jamming with Korner, who wondered why Plant had not yet been discovered. Plant and Korner were recording an album with Plant on vocals until Page had asked him to join "the New Yardbirds", a.k.a. Led Zeppelin. Only two songs are in circulation from these recordings: "Steal Away" and "Operator". Korner gave one of his last radio interviews to BBC Midlands on the Record Collectors Show with Mike Adams and Chris Savory.

== Broadcasting ==
In the 1960s Korner began a media career, working initially as a showbusiness interviewer and then on ITV's Five O'Clock Club, a children's TV show. Korner also wrote about blues for the music papers, and continued to maintain his own career as a blues artist, especially in Europe. Korner's main career in the 1970s was in broadcasting. In 1973, he presented a six-part documentary on BBC Radio 1, The Rolling Stones Story, and in 1977 he established a Sunday-night show on Radio 1, Alexis Korner's Blues and Soul Show, which ran until 1981. He also used his gravelly voice to great effect as an advertising voice-over artist. In 1983, Korner presented the 13 part BBC Radio 1 series, Guitar Greats, interviewing each of the artists, and playing their music.

== 1970s ==
=== CCS period ===
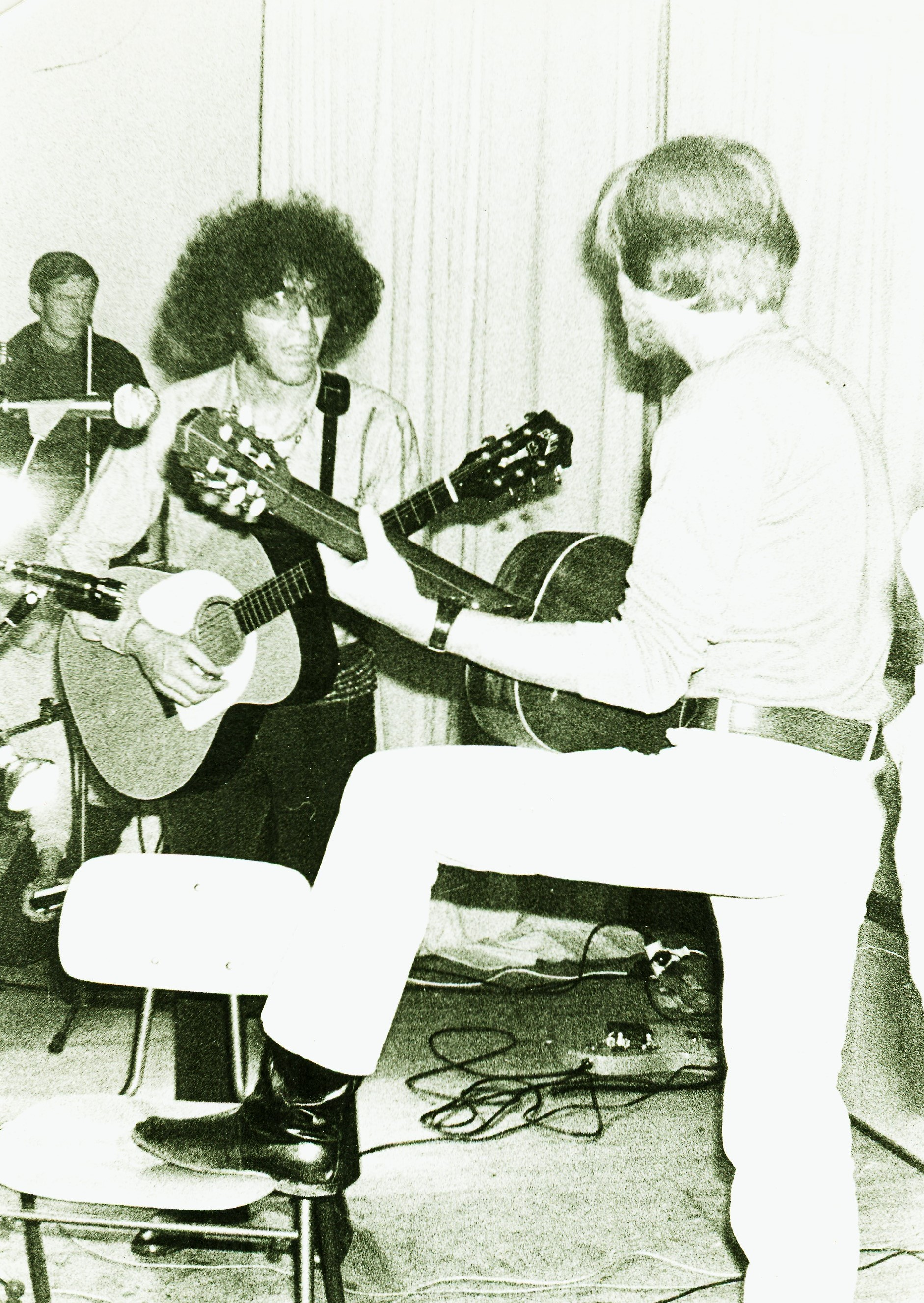
Korner and Peter Thorup in Bremen

In 1970, Korner and Thorup formed a big-band ensemble, CCS – short for "The Collective Consciousness Society" – which had several hit singles produced by Mickie Most, including a version of Led Zeppelin's "Whole Lotta Love", which was used as the theme for BBC's Top of the Pops between 1970 and 1981. Another instrumental called "Brother" was used as the theme to the BBC Radio 1 Top 20/40 when Tom Browne/Simon Bates presented the programme in the 1970s. It was also used in the 1990s on Radio Luxembourg for the Top 20 Singles chart. This was the period of Korner's greatest commercial success in the UK. In 1973, he provided a voice part for the Hot Chocolate single release Brother Louie.

=== 1970s to 1984 ===
Korner with Snape

In 1973, he and Peter Thorup formed another group, Snape, with Boz Burrell, Mel Collins, and Ian Wallace, who were previously together in King Crimson. Korner also played on B.B. King's In London album, and cut his own, similar "supersession" album; Get Off My Cloud, with Keith Richards, Steve Marriott, Peter Frampton, Nicky Hopkins and members of Joe Cocker's Grease Band. In the mid-1970s, while touring Germany, Korner established an intensive working relationship with bassist Colin Hodgkinson who played for the support act Back Door. They would continue to collaborate right up until Korner's death.

In 1978, for Korner's 50th birthday, an all-star concert was held featuring many of his above-mentioned friends, as well as Eric Clapton, Paul Jones, Chris Farlowe, Zoot Money and others, which was later released as The Party Album, and as a video.

In 1981, Korner joined another "supergroup", Rocket 88, a project led by Ian Stewart based on boogie-woogie keyboard players, which featured a rhythm section comprising Jack Bruce and Charlie Watts, among others, as well as a horn section. They toured Europe and released an album on Atlantic Records. He played in Italy with Paul Jones and the Blues Society of Italian bluesman Guido Toffoletti.

== Family life and death ==
In 1950, Korner married Roberta Melville (died 2021), daughter of art critic Robert Melville. He had a daughter, singer Sappho Gillett Korner (died 2006), and two sons, guitarist Nicholas 'Nico' Korner (died 1989) and sound engineer Damian Korner (died 2008).

Alexis Korner died in London from lung cancer on 1 January 1984, at the age of 55.

Korner was posthumously inducted, by Keith Richards, into the Rock and Roll Hall of Fame in 2024 in the musical influence category.

== Album discography (selected UK and other releases) ==
- Blues from the Roundhouse 10-inch (1957) – Alexis Korner's Breakdown Group
- R&B from the Marquee (1962) – Alexis Korner's Blues Incorporated
- Red Hot from Alex (1964) – Alexis Korner's Blues Incorporated
- At the Cavern (1964) – Alexis Korner's Blues Incorporated
- Alexis Korner's Blues Incorporated (1965) – Alexis Korner's Blues Incorporated
- Sky High (1966) – Alexis Korner Blues Incorporated
- I Wonder Who (1967)
- Alexis Korner's Blues Incorporated (re-issue of Sky High) – Alexis Korner's Blues Incorporated
- A New Generation of Blues (1968)
- Both Sides (1970) – New Church
- CCS 1st (1970) – CCS
- Alexis Korner (1971)
- Bootleg Him! (1972)
- CCS 2nd (1972) – CCS
- Accidentally Borne in New Orleans (1972) – with Peter Thorup; Snape
- Live on Tour in Germany (1973) – with Peter Thorup; Snape
- The Best Band in the Land (1973) – CCS
- Alexis Korner (1974)
- Get Off My Cloud (1975)
- The Lost Album (1977)
- Just Easy (1978)
- The Party Album (1979) – Alexis Korner and Friends
- Me (1980)
- Rocket 88 (1981) – Rocket 88
- Juvenile Delinquent (1984)
- Testament (1985) – with Colin Hodgkinson
- Live in Paris (1988) – with Colin Hodgkinson

== Bibliography ==
- Bob Brunning (1986), Blues: The British Connection, London: Helter Skelter, 2002. ISBN 1-900924-41-2
- Bob Brunning, The Fleetwood Mac Story: Rumours and Lies, Omnibus Press, 2004; foreword by B.B. King
- Dick Heckstall-Smith (2004), The Safest Place in the World: A Personal History of British Rhythm and Blues, Clear Books. ISBN 0-7043-2696-5. First Edition: Blowing the Blues – Fifty Years Playing the British Blues
- Christopher Hjort, Strange Brew: Eric Clapton and the British Blues Boom, 1965–1970, foreword by John Mayall, Jawbone, 2007. ISBN 1-906002-00-2
- Harry Shapiro, Alexis Korner: The Biography, London: Bloomsbury Publishing PLC, 1997; Discography by Mark Troster. ISBN 0-7475-3163-3
