= CCS (band) =

English musical group

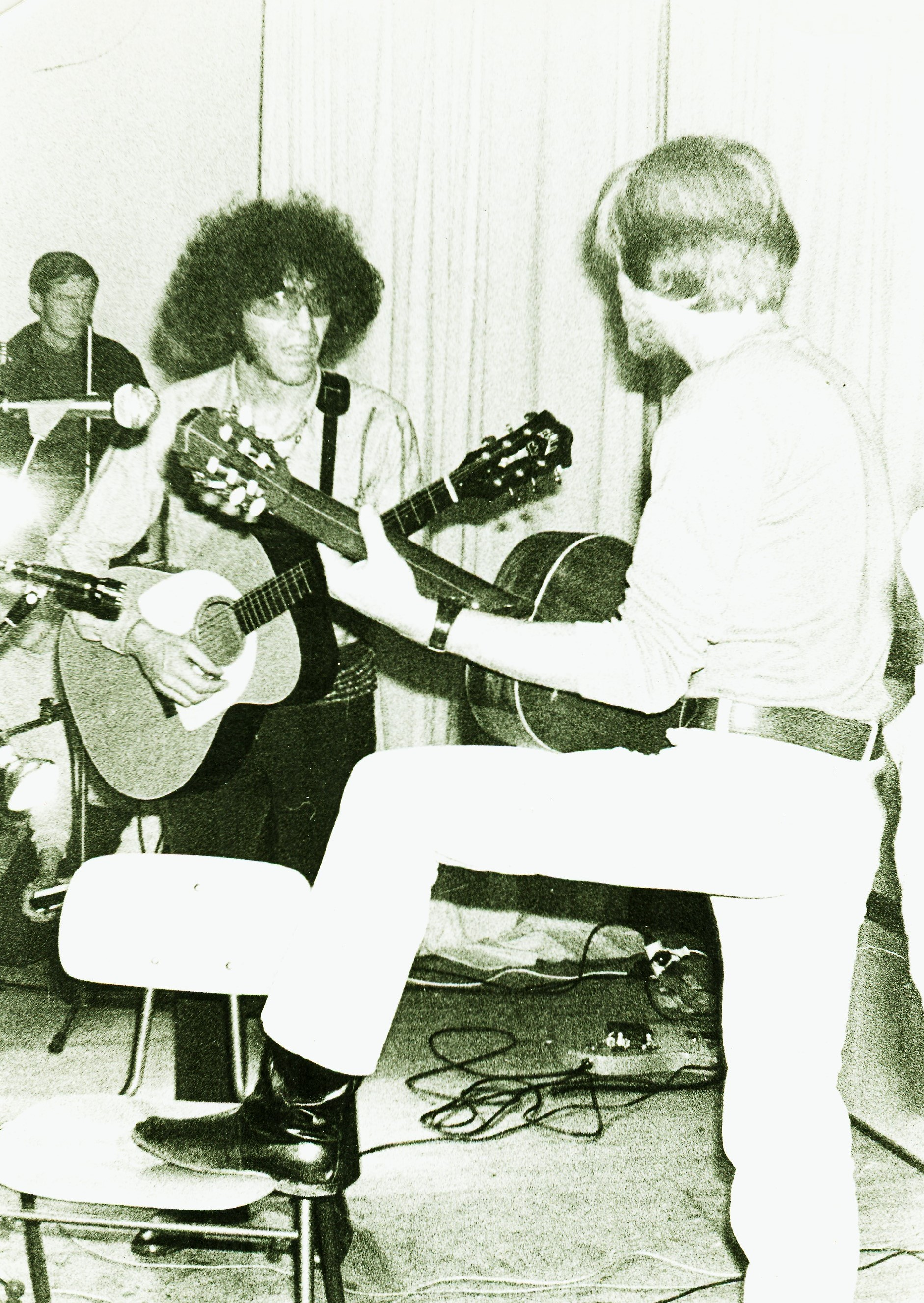
- Alexis Korner and Peter Thorup at Bremen in 1968

Background information
- Origin: England
- Genres: Rock, blues
- Years active: 1970–1973
- Label: Rak
- Past members: John Cameron; Herbie Flowers; Bill Geldard; Alexis Korner; Don Lusher; Harold McNair; Barry Morgan; Mickie Most; Alan Parker; Peter Thorup

CCS, sometimes written as C.C.S., were a British musical group, led by blues guitarist Alexis Korner. The name was derived as an abbreviation of Collective Consciousness Society.

Formed in 1970 by musical director John Cameron and record producer Mickie Most, CCS consisted largely of session musicians, and was created primarily as a recording outfit. The personnel also included Peter Thorup, vocals; Alan Parker, guitar; Harold McNair, flute; Herbie Flowers, bass; Barry Morgan, drums; plus Don Lusher and Bill Geldard, trombone. Some of the musicians were also members of Blue Mink.

CCS are best known for their instrumental version of Led Zeppelin's 1969 track "Whole Lotta Love", which entered the UK Singles Chart in 1970, and was used as the theme music for the BBC pop programme Top of the Pops ("TOTP") for most of the 1970s, and, in a remixed version, between 1998 and 2003. Technically, the TOTP theme was not by CCS, but was recorded by the TOTP orchestra one morning before the day's rehearsals. Nevertheless, the band was conducted by John Cameron on that occasion and many of the musicians were CCS regulars. This enabled the production to tailor the tune to the correct duration and avoided the weekly payment of royalties to the record label.

Their highest-charting singles were the Donovan song "Walking", and "Tap Turns on the Water". They also recorded three albums, including cover versions of the old blues standard "Boom Boom", "Living in the Past", and "(I Can't Get No) Satisfaction" as well as original material.

Their single, "Brother", was used as the theme to Tom Browne's and Simon Bates' Sunday Top 40/20 Chart Rundown on BBC Radio 1 in the 1970s. The band were also responsible for the first set of jingles for Manchester's Piccadilly Radio when the station launched in April 1974. The short-lived CCS broke up in 1973, while Alexis Korner moved on to form the group Snape.

== Discography ==
=== Albums ===
- CCS, also known as Whole Lotta Love (RAK SRKA 6751) (October 1970)
- CCS, also known as C.C.S. 2 (RAK SRAK 503) (March 1972) – UK No. 23
- The Best Band in the Land (RAK SRAK 504) (September 1973)

=== Compilation albums ===
- The Best of C.C.S. (RAK SRAK 527) (1977)
- Whole Lotta Love (EMI CDP 7 97553 2) (1991)
- A's, B's & Rarities (EMI Gold 560 2532) (2004)

=== Singles ===
| Year | Title A-side b/w B-side | UK | AUS | CAN | UK label & catalogue number |
|---|---|---|---|---|---|
| September 1970 | "Whole Lotta Love" b/w ""Boom Boom" | 13 | - | 37 | RAK Records 104; initial pressing had "Boom Boom" as A-side |
| January 1971 | "Walking" b/w "Salome" [US & Canada B-side: "Lookin' for Fun"] | 7 | 95 | - | RAK 109 |
| August 1971 | "Tap Turns on the Water" b/w "Save the World" | 5 | 95 | - | RAK 119 |
| February 1972 | "Brother" b/w "Mister, What You Can't Have I Can Get" | 25 | - | - | RAK 126 |
| October 1972 | "Sixteen Tons" b/w "This Is My Life" | 54 (Note: Chart position is from the official UK "Breakers List".) | - | - | RAK 141 |
| February 1973 | "Shakin' All Over" b/w "Cannibal Sheep"(Unissued) | - | - | - | RAK PSR 356; promo only |
| June 1973 | "The Band Played the Boogie" b/w "Hang It on Me" | 36 | 8 | - | RAK 154 |
| April 1974 | "Hurricane Coming" b/w "Dragster" | - | - | - | RAK 172 |
