= Peter Thorup =

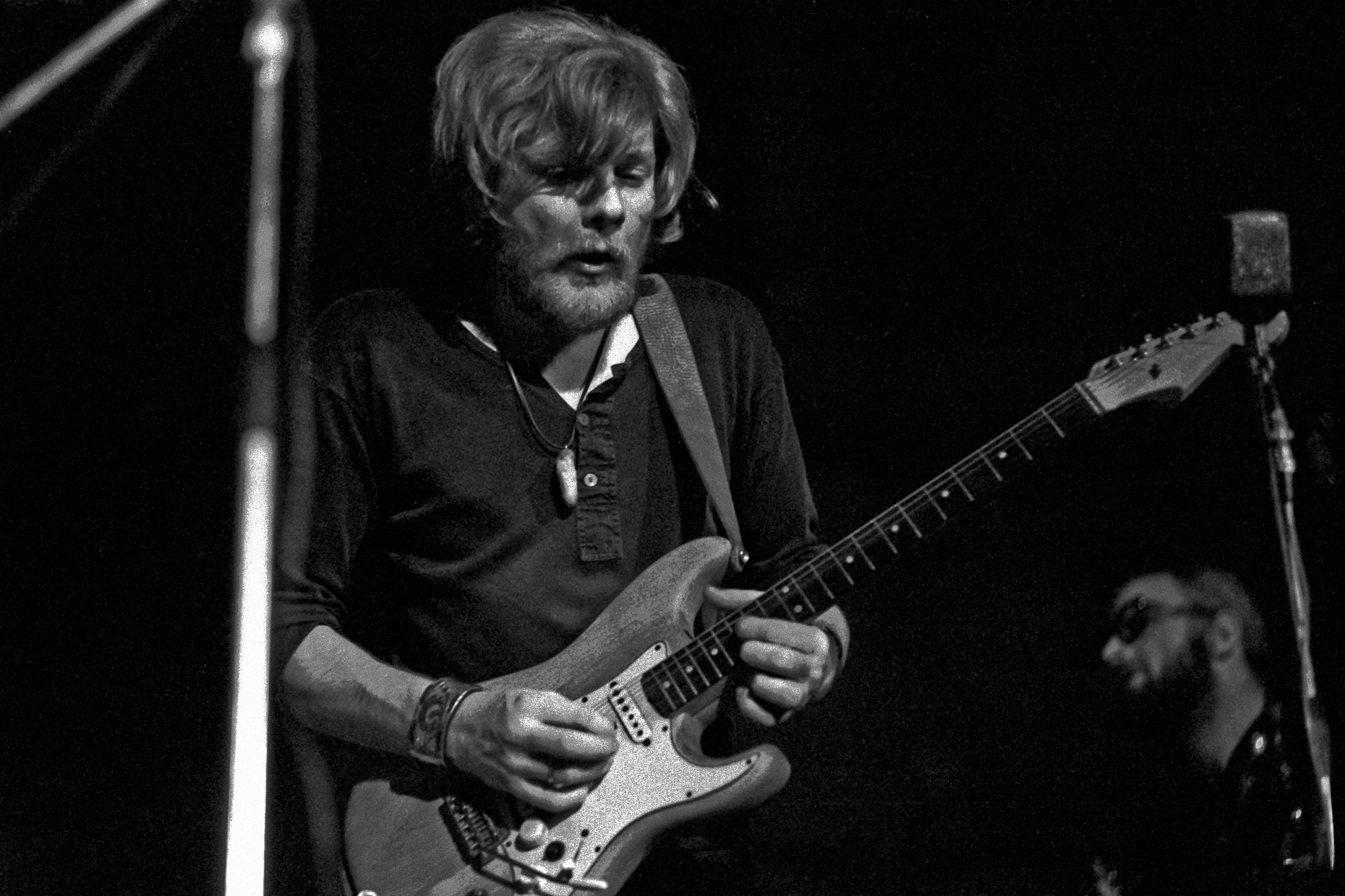
- Thorup performing in Hamburg, November 1972.

Background information
- Born: 14 December 1948; Sollerod, Denmark
- Died: 3 August 2007 (aged 58); Ronne, Bornholm Island, Denmark
- Genres: Jazz, Rock, blues, pop
- Occupation(s): Musician, composer, producer
- Instrument(s): Vocals, guitar
- Years active: 1964–2007
- Labels: RAK Records

Peter Eiberg Thorup (14 December 1948 – 3 August 2007) was a Danish guitarist, singer, composer and record producer. He was one of the most important blues musicians in Denmark, and he was known outside his own country, when in the late 1960s he met Alexis Korner and the two formed the bands New Church, The Beefeaters, CCS, and later Snape.

== Career ==
Thorup played at the age of 18 in the Danish band, Beefeaters, and he met Korner on his concert tour in Scandinavia. They formed New Church, and then in 1970 CCS around Korner and Thorup, the rest of the line-up was rather loose and depended on the availability in the schedules of many musicians. Frequent performers within the band included Tony Carr (drums), trumpeter Harold Beckett, Herbie Flowers on bass guitar, Henry Lowther (trumpet) and Harold McNair with woodwind instruments. They were among the first groups to record on Mickie Most's RAK Records and John Cameron arranged their albums. They had several hit singles, commencing with a cover of Led Zeppelin's "Whole Lotta Love", which was used as the theme for BBC Television's Top Of The Pops.

Their music was characterised by Korner's growling vocals and Thorup's higher tones. They split in 1973 to create a band, Snape, that Korner and Thorup formed when on tour with King Crimson in the United States. King Crimson members Boz Burrell, Mel Collins, and Ian Wallace left Robert Fripp in New Orleans to continue on tour with Korner. Thorup appeared on Korner's 1972 studio album Accidentally Born in New Orleans. The album included the tracks, "One Scotch, One Bourbon, One Beer" by Rudolph Toombs, "Rock Me", "You Got the Power (To Turn Me On)" by Willie Chambers" and "Lo and Behold" by James Taylor. It's likely that Thorup's influence on Danish blues band, The Blues Overdrive inspired them to record "You Got the Power (To Turn Me On)". It appeared on their Overdrive Live! album.

A live album from this band was released in Germany. During this period, Thorup frequented London's nightclubs, performing with Korner and Colin Hodgkinson on bass.

In 1976, Thorup returned to Denmark to work with Danish musicians including Sebastian.

Thorup mostly played rock or blues, but he also got a local pop hit, recording a Danish version of Kenny Rogers and Dolly Parton's "Islands in the Stream" with Anne Grete in 1984. In the last couple of decades of his life he lived a quiet life, playing small concerts in Denmark and recording a few albums.
