= All-Stars (band) =

UK musical group

The All-Stars
- Also known as: The R&B All-Stars; The Cyril Davies All-Stars; The Immediate All-Stars; The Carlo Little All-Stars
- Origin: London, England
- Genres: British blues
- Years active: 1962–1965; 1999–2002
- Labels: Pye; Immediate; Angel Air
- Past members: Cyril Davies; Jimmy Page; Carlo Little; Nicky Hopkins; Ricky Fenson; Bernie Watson; Long John Baldry; Hazel Futa; Patience Gcwabe; Eunice Mamsie Mthombeni; Keith Scott; Cliff Barton; Micky Waller; Geoff Bradford; Johnny Parker; Bob Wackett; Jeff Beck; Eric Clapton; Mick Jagger; Ian Stewart; Bill Wyman; Charlie Watts; Art Wood; Alex Chanter; Eddie Armer; Johnny Casanova

The All-Stars were a short-lived English blues combo active in the early-mid 1960s. Originally known as the Cyril Davies (R&B) All-Stars, their later recordings are often credited to the Immediate All-Stars due to their releases on Immediate Records. In 1999, the group reformed as the Carlo Little All-Stars.

== History ==
=== The Cyril Davies R&B All-Stars ===
The All-Stars were initially formed as a backing band for vocalist and blues harmonica player Cyril Davies after his departure from Alexis Korner's Blues Incorporated in October 1962. The original lineup was tentatively named 'The Cyril Davies Blues Band' and was made up of former members of Screaming Lord Sutch's group, the Savages, including Nicky Hopkins on piano, Carlo Little on drums and Ricky Fenson (a.k.a. Rick Brown) on bass. The band also featured Jimmy Page on guitar for a brief period, though he soon backed out to focus on his burgeoning career as a session musician and was replaced by Bernie Watson, another former member of the Savages.

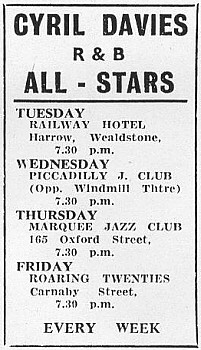
With Davies, the All-Stars had standing engagements at a number of London's jazz clubs.

In December 1962, Davies was in competition with Korner to recruit Long John Baldry as a second lead vocalist. Baldry had previously performed with Blues Incorporated while Davies was still a member, with both vocalists being featured on the 1962 album R&B from the Marquee. Following the formation of the All-Stars, Baldry played a few shows with each band before eventually committing to join Davies' camp in January 1963.

Around this time, Davies also added female backing singers to the lineup in the form of South African vocal group the Velvettes (not to be confused with Motown trio, the Velvelettes), who had emigrated to England after touring with the musical stage production King Kong. The Velvettes were initially a quartet made up of Peggy Phango, Hazel Futa, Patience Gcwabe and Eunice Mamsie Mthombeni, though Phango soon departed to pursue a solo career, leaving the rest of the group to join the All-Stars as a trio.

On 27 February, the All-Stars recorded their first single for Pye Records: the original compositions "Country Line Special" and "Chicago Calling", released under the name 'Cyril Davies and His Rhythm and Blues All-Stars'. However, Baldry and the Velvettes are not featured on these recordings.

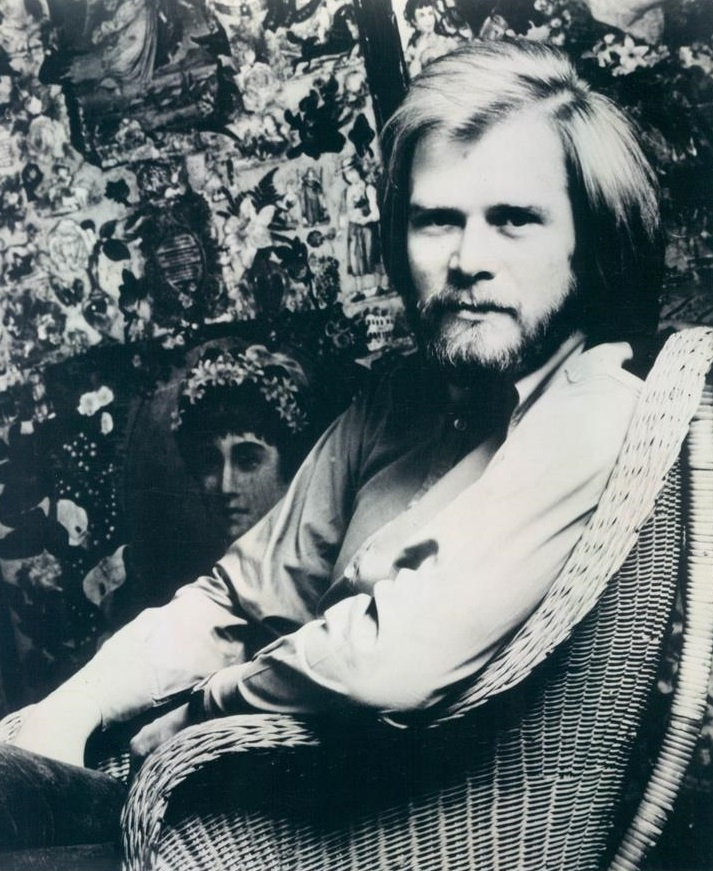
Long John Baldry was co-lead vocalist with the All-Stars throughout 1963. He would later take over as band leader following Davies' death in 1964.

In May 1963, illness forced the departure of Hopkins as he was hospitalised for several months. Former Blues Incorporated pianist Keith Scott was recruited in his stead, but growing tensions between Davies and the other band members meant that Fenson, Watson and Little each soon left the group to be replaced by bassist Cliff Barton, guitarist Geoff Bradford and drummer Micky Waller.

In August, this lineup recorded the R&B All-Stars' second single for Pye: "Preachin' the Blues", a Robert Johnson cover, and "Sweet Mary", a Lead Belly cover. As with the previous recordings, Baldry and the Velvettes are not featured. Instead, backing vocals for "Preachin' the Blues" are provided by Alex Bradford and Madeline Bell. Towards the end of 1963, Scott and Waller were themselves replaced by the group's final members Johnny Parker and Bob Wackett.

Cyril Davies died on 7 January 1964 of pleurisy and endocarditis. Following this, Pye Records paid tribute to Davies by re-releasing the four tracks he had recorded for them as the EP The Sound of Cyril Davies and His Rhythm and Blues All-Stars.

Baldry assumed the role of band leader, and with fellow All-Stars Barton, Bradford and Parker went on to perform as 'The Hoochie Coochie Men' together with Rod Stewart on vocals and Ernie O'Malley on drums. Carlo Little also joined them briefly in June 1964, but soon left due to "a difference in musical opinion" between himself and Baldry. The Hoochie Coochie Men released one album, Long John's Blues, before disbanding in October 1965. Baldry and Stewart went on to form Steampacket with former All-Stars Ricky Fenson and Micky Waller.

At least one further song is known to have been recorded by the All-Stars during Davies' lifetime: a cover of Little Walter's "Someday Baby", first issued by Immediate Records on the 1968 compilation album Blues Anytime Vol. 3. This track was credited to 'Cyril Davies and the All-Stars', although it is not clear when the recording was made, nor with which lineup. In 1986 a sixth track was released: a cover of Buddy Holly's "Not Fade Away" on the Castle Communications compilation album White Boy Blues Vol. 2, again credited to 'Cyril Davies and the All-Stars'.

=== The All-Stars featuring Jeff Beck ===
By 1965, Jimmy Page had established himself as a prolific session musician and was signed to Immediate Records as an in-house producer. Around eighteen months after Cyril Davies' death, Page brought together former All-Stars Nicky Hopkins, Carlo Little and Cliff Barton to record with him and his friend Jeff Beck. Together they recorded five original tracks, with Hopkins taking the lead on "Piano Shuffle", Beck on "Chuckles" and "Steelin'", and Page on "Down in the Boots" and "L.A. Breakdown".

The first track from this session to be issued was "Steelin'", although its initial release was not credited to the group. London fashion photographer David Anthony (under the pseudonym 'Charles Dickens') had recorded a cover of The Rolling Stones' "So Much in Love" for Immediate Records, and when this was released as a single in 1965 it featured "Steelin'" as its b-side under the title "Our Soul Brother TH", credited solely to Dickens. The rest of the tracks from this session would eventually get their first release in 1968, alongside "Steelin'", properly credited to 'The All-Stars featuring...' on the Immediate compilation album Blues Anytime Vol. 3.

=== Page, Clapton and the Immediate All-Stars ===
In June 1965, Jimmy Page invited Eric Clapton to join him in a jam session at his home studio on Miles Road in London, and the two guitarists recorded seven instrumental tracks together: "Choker", "Draggin' My Tail", "Freight Loader", "Miles Road", "Snake Drive", "Tribute to Elmore" and "West Coast Idea". Page and Clapton were both of the opinion that the tracks they recorded were merely rehearsals rather than fully formed songs, but representatives of Immediate Records soon approached Page informing him that they legally owned the publishing rights to all recordings he made as per the terms of their contract. Page reluctantly gave them the recordings of the jam session in fear of a lawsuit and was asked to clean them up by adding overdubs, which he recorded that August at Olympic Studios with a new lineup of the All-Stars. This time, the group featured members of The Rolling Stones: Mick Jagger, Bill Wyman, Ian Stewart and Charlie Watts (credited as Chris Winters), facilitated by the Stones' manager at the time also being Immediate Records' co-founder, Andrew Loog Oldham. This was seen by Clapton as a betrayal of confidence on Page's part, and greatly damaged the personal relationship between the two guitarists for years to follow.

"That was a real tragedy for me... Eric and I got friendly and he came down and we did some recording at home, and Immediate found out that I had tapes of it and said they belonged to them, because I was employed by them. I argued that they couldn't put them out because they were just variations of blues structures, and in the end we dubbed some other instruments over some of them and they came out- with liner notes attributed to me (on earlier copies) though I didn't have anything to do with writing them. I didn't get a penny out of it anyway... Stu from the Stones was on piano, Mick Jagger did some harp, Bill Wyman played bass and Charlie Watts was on drums."

— Jimmy Page talking to Pete Frame.

Immediate Records first released these tracks alongside the All-Stars' previous recordings in 1968, spread out across their compilation albums Blues Anytime Vol. 1–3. The tracks were initially attributed simply to Eric Clapton, or 'Eric Clapton and Jimmy Page', although many subsequent releases have given the credit to 'The Immediate All-Stars'.

=== The Carlo Little All-Stars ===
In late 1962, the Rolling Stones were beginning to gain a following as a new band on the London blues scene. At the time, the band consisted of vocalist Mick Jagger, guitarists Keith Richards and Brian Jones, and pianist Ian Stewart. The group played with a number of different bassists and drummers during this period, including members of the Cyril Davies All-Stars Carlo Little and Ricky Fenson. Little and Fenson made a strong impression on the younger musicians, and were repeatedly asked to join the band, but the Stones at the time couldn't afford to match what they were earning with the All-Stars. After finally recruiting permanent bassist Bill Wyman in December 1962 and drummer Charlie Watts in January 1963, the Stones played a support slot for the All-Stars for about a month, with Little and Fenson continuing to occasionally fill in for Watts and Wyman whenever the latter two were unavailable to play.

"Monday 14th Jan, 1963: Flamingo Club. Surprise!!! Rick and Carlo played. Without a doubt the Rollin' Stones were the most fantastic group operating in the country tonight. – Rick and Carlo! Little was a killing drummer, great energy. From time to time they'd sit in with us - that's when Charlie still wasn't with us, and it's why he decided to join the band, because he heard we had this red hot rhythm section. Ricky and Carlo, if they went into a solo, they would go into turbo max. The room would take off; they almost blew us off the stage they were so good. When Carlo set into that bass drum, this is what I'm talking about. This was rock and roll! That was the first time I got three feet off the ground and into the stratosphere."

— Keith Richards, from his memoir Life.

Decades later, in March 1998, Little was interviewed by Mojo magazine about his time playing with the Rolling Stones, which led to several more interviews and a TV documentary being produced for Channel 5. Little flew to Paris for the documentary, where he was reunited with the Stones, meeting them backstage at one of their shows and being invited to attend Jagger's 55th birthday party at their hotel.

Capitalising on the attention and publicity he was now receiving, Little reformed the All-Stars in 1999 with Fenson on bass and including vocalist Art Wood, guitarist Alex Chanter, Eddie Armer playing harmonica and Johnny Casanova on keyboards. They recorded an album together in 2001, named Never Stop Rockin', which also featured Ronnie Wood, Jeff Beck, Long John Baldry, Matthew Fisher and the Chanter Sisters, though this remained unreleased for several years.

Carlo Little died of lung cancer on 6 August 2005. The Carlo Little All-Stars' album Never Stop Rockin' was released posthumously by Angel Air Records in January 2009.

== Personnel ==
=== 1962–1964 ===
Cyril Davies and the R&B All-Stars
Note: Dates represented here are approximate, accurate only to within a month.

- Cyril Davies – vocals, harmonica (October 1962 – January 1964)
- Jimmy Page – guitar (October 1962)
- Nicky Hopkins – piano (October 1962 – May 1963)
- Ricky Fenson, a.k.a. Rick Brown – bass (October 1962 – June 1963)
- Carlo Little – drums (October 1962 – August 1963)
- Bernie Watson – guitar (November 1962 – July 1963)
- Long John Baldry – vocals (January 1963 – January 1964)
- The Velvettes – backing vocals (January 1963 – January 1964)
  - Hazel Futa, Patience Gcwabe, Eunice Mamsie Mthombeni
- Keith Scott – piano (May – October 1963)
- Cliff Barton – bass (June 1963 – January 1964)
- Micky Waller – drums (August – November 1963)
- Geoff Bradford – guitar (July 1963 – January 1964)
- Johnny Parker – piano (October 1963 – January 1964)
- Bob Wackett – drums (November 1963 – January 1964)

Timeline

=== 1965 ===
The All-Stars featuring Jeff Beck

- Jimmy Page – guitar, production
- Jeff Beck – guitar
- Nicky Hopkins – piano
- Cliff Barton – bass
- Carlo Little – drums

The Immediate All-Stars

- Jimmy Page – guitar, production
- Eric Clapton – guitar (original jam session)
- Mick Jagger – harmonica (overdubs)
- Ian Stewart – piano (overdubs)
- Bill Wyman – bass (overdubs)
- Charlie Watts, credited as Chris Winters – drums (overdubs)

=== 1999–2002 ===
The Carlo Little All-Stars

- Carlo Little – drums, band leader
- Art Wood – vocals
- Alex Chanter – guitar, vocals
- Eddie Armer – harmonica
- Johnny Casanova – keyboards
- Ricky Fenson – bass

== Discography ==
=== Pye Records ===
All releases credited to Cyril Davies and His Rhythm and Blues All-Stars.

Date	Release	Notes
1963	"Country Line Special" b/w "Chicago Calling"	Recorded 27 February 1963.; Baldry and the Velvettes not featured.
1963	"Preachin' the Blues" (Robert Johnson cover) b/w "Sweet Mary" (Lead Belly cover)	Recorded in August 1963.; Baldry and the Velvettes again not featured.; Backing vocals on "Preachin' the Blues" by Alex Bradford and Madeline Bell.
1964	The Sound of Cyril Davies and His Rhythm and Blues All-Stars: No. / Title / Length; 1. / "Country Line Special" / 2:34; 2. / "Chicago Calling" / 2:26; 3. / "Preachin' the Blues" / 2:11; 4. / "Sweet Mary" / 3:04	Compilation EP of all 4 tracks from the previous 2 singles.

=== Immediate Records ===
Listed here is only the initial release of each track recorded by the All-Stars. Following Immediate Records going out of business in 1970, these tracks have been released on many compilation albums by multiple record labels, major and independent.

Date	Release
1968	Blues Anytime Vol. 1 (a.k.a. An Anthology of British Blues Vol. 1): No. / Title / Credited artist / Length; 2. / "Snake Drive" / Eric Clapton / 2:29; 5. / "Tribute to Elmore" / Eric Clapton / 2:09; 9. / "West Coast Idea" / Eric Clapton / 2:19
1968	Blues Anytime Vol. 2 (a.k.a. An Anthology of British Blues Vol. 2): No. / Title / Credited artist / Length; 4. / "Draggin' My Tail" / Eric Clapton and Jimmy Page / 3:08; 7. / "Freight Loader" / Eric Clapton and Jimmy Page / 2:48; 10. / "Choker" / Eric Clapton and Jimmy Page / 1:26
1968	Blues Anytime Vol. 3 (a.k.a. The Beginning: British Blues): No. / Title / Credited artist / Length; 1. / "Someday Baby" (Little Walter cover) / Cyril Davies and the All-Stars / 2:50; 2. / "Steelin'" / The All-Stars featuring Jeff Beck / 2:39; 3. / "L.A. Breakdown" / The All-Stars featuring Jimmy Page / 2:06; 4. / "Chuckles" / The All-Stars featuring Jeff Beck / 2:24; 5. / "Down in the Boots" / The All-Stars featuring Jimmy Page / 3:26; 6. / "Piano Shuffle" / The All-Stars featuring Nicky Hopkins / 3:00; 7. / "Miles Road" / Eric Clapton and Jimmy Page / 2:26

Castle Communications

Date	Release
1986	White Boy Blues Vol. 2: No. / Title / Credited artist / Length; 13. / "Not Fade Away" (Buddy Holly cover) / Cyril Davies and the All-Stars ^{*} / 2:14

^* It has been suggested that this track was in fact recorded by Dave Berry and the Cruisers and misattributed to Davies.

=== Angel Air Records ===
Carlo Little All-Stars.

Date
2009
Release

Never Stop Rockin'
No.	Title	Length
1.	"All Over Now"	3:44
2.	"Mystery Train" (feat. Long John Baldry and Jeff Beck)	5:01
3.	"Born in the Country"	3:34
4.	"Midnight Special"	3:16
5.	"Mississippi" (feat. Jeff Beck)	4:15
6.	"Iko, Iko" (feat. Long John Baldry)	3:04
7.	"Country Line Special" (Cyril Davies cover, feat. Ronnie Wood)	3:24
8.	"Chicago Calling" (Cyril Davies cover)	2:26
9.	"Never Stop Rockin'"	3:57
