= Carlo Little =

English rock and roll drummer

- Born: Carl O'Neil Little; 17 December 1938; Shepherd's Bush, London, England
- Died: 6 August 2005 (aged 66) Cleadon, Tyne and Wear, England
- Genres: Rock; British blues
- Occupation: Musician
- Instrument: Drums
- Years active: 1960–2002
- Formerly of: The Savages; The All-Stars; The Rolling Stones; The Flower Pot Men
- Website: carlolittle.com

Carl O'Neil Little (17 December 1938 – 6 August 2005), better known by his stage name Carlo Little, was a rock and roll drummer, based in the London nightclub scene in the 1960s. He played in an early version of the Rolling Stones. Little was also with Cyril Davies' All-Stars and was a founder member of Screaming Lord Sutch's Savages.

== Early life ==
Born Carl O'Neil Little at the Queen Charlotte's Hospital, Shepherd's Bush, London, he was brought up and lived in Wembley, Middlesex for most of his life with his sister Carole. His fellow townsmen included peers Keith Moon, Ginger Baker and Charlie Watts, all of whom would find fame with the same instrument. He was included in the evacuation of civilians during World War II as a child, and sent to relatives in Wales during the Blitz in London.

As a teenager he discovered Ted Heath and then skiffle music, especially Chris Barber and Lonnie Donegan. Skiffle inspired Little to join a band, Derek Addison's Rhythm Katz. By the late 1950s rock and roll had arrived in the United Kingdom, and Little became a fan of Chuck Berry and Little Richard, whose drummer Earl Palmer he was influenced by. Little was called up in 1958 to do National Service in the Royal Fusiliers (City of London Regiment) Corps of Drums, serving in Kenya and Malta, and he was singled out to become head drummer due to his loud playing. He was demobbed in 1960.

== Career ==
On his return to civilian life, he met David Sutch and formed the Savages with amongst others Nicky Hopkins who lived locally. Screaming Lord Sutch & the Savages toured the UK and became known for their unique British rock and roll shows. The bulk of the band members, including Little, left in 1962 to join the Cyril Davies All Stars, and recorded a single "Country Line Special", an instrumental track which influenced Keith Richards and Ray Davies. He also played a few gigs with the young Rolling Stones and was asked by Brian Jones to join permanently before they hired Charlie Watts as their official drummer in January 1963. In 1998, during their European tour, he was invited as an official guest backstage at one of their Paris concerts.

Little gave Keith Moon drum lessons. Little was the loudest drummer many had ever seen or heard, one of the first to ever hammer the bass drum.

Little continued to work as a session drummer throughout the 1960s, and toured with the Flower Pot Men, Billie Davis and Neil Christian in Europe. He later auditioned for Deep Purple and Ian Dury but signed to Decca Records in 1973 as Hurricane with Stuart Colman and Freddie 'Fingers' Lee. Little played in pub bands throughout the 1970s and 1980s, until he reformed the All Stars in 2000. The band now included Art Wood on vocals, Alex Chanter (brother of the Chanter Sisters) on lead guitar and vocals, Johnny Casanova on keyboards and vocals, Eddie Armer on harmonicas and fellow former Cyril Davies band member, Ricky Brown (aka Ricky Fenson), on bass. Carlo and his All Stars recorded an album, which also featured Ron Wood, Jeff Beck, Long John Baldry, Matthew Fisher, Simon Bell and the Chanter Sisters. The album, entitled Never Stop Rockin', (the title track penned by Little), could not be released until 2009, so he was unable to see the finished product.

Next to his musical activities, he worked as a bread salesman and entrepreneur until his retirement.

Little died of lung cancer in Cleadon, Tyne and Wear in 2005, at the age of 66. The Carlo Little All Stars album Never Stop Rockin' was released by Angel Air Records in January 2009.

== See also ==
- British rock
- Blues rock
- Rhythm and blues
