= British rhythm and blues =

Musical movement in the United Kingdom

- Stylistic origins: Rhythm and blues; rock and roll; British jazz; skiffle; British folk revival
- Cultural origins: Late 1950s – early 1960s, United Kingdom
- Derivative forms: Hard rock; garage rock; British soul; psychedelic rock; progressive rock; pub rock

Other topics
- Blues rock; British blues; beat music

British rhythm and blues (or R&B) was a musical movement that developed in the United Kingdom between the late 1950s and the early 1960s, and reached a peak in the mid-1960s. It overlapped with, but was distinct from, the broader British beat and more purist British blues scenes, attempting to emulate the music of American blues and rock and roll pioneers, such as Muddy Waters and Howlin' Wolf, Chuck Berry and Bo Diddley. It often placed greater emphasis on guitars and was often played with greater energy.

The origins of the movement were in the British jazz, skiffle and folk movements of the 1950s. The 1958 visit of Muddy Waters influenced key figures Cyril Davies and Alexis Korner to turn to electric blues and form the band Blues Incorporated, which became something of a clearing house for British rhythm and blues musicians. A flourishing scene of clubs and groups emerged in the later 1950s and 1960s and bands began to break through into mainstream success. Major acts included the Rolling Stones, Manfred Mann, the Animals, the Yardbirds, Them, and the Spencer Davis Group, who dominated the UK and US charts from 1964, in the wake of the Merseybeat craze, becoming central to the beatnik and mod subculture in the UK and a second wave of British Invasion acts in the US.

Several of the bands and their members went on to become leading rock music performers of the late 1960s and early 1970s, helping to create psychedelic, progressive and hard rock and making rhythm and blues a key component of that music. In the mid to late-1970s, British R&B enjoyed a revival through the British soul and disco scenes, the pub rock circuit, new wave music and the mod revival, and has enjoyed a resurgence of interest since the late 1980s. In the 2000s, a British version of contemporary R&B began gaining popularity, and since the late 2000s the success of British female singers influenced by soul and R&B led to talk of another "R&B British invasion".

== Characteristics ==
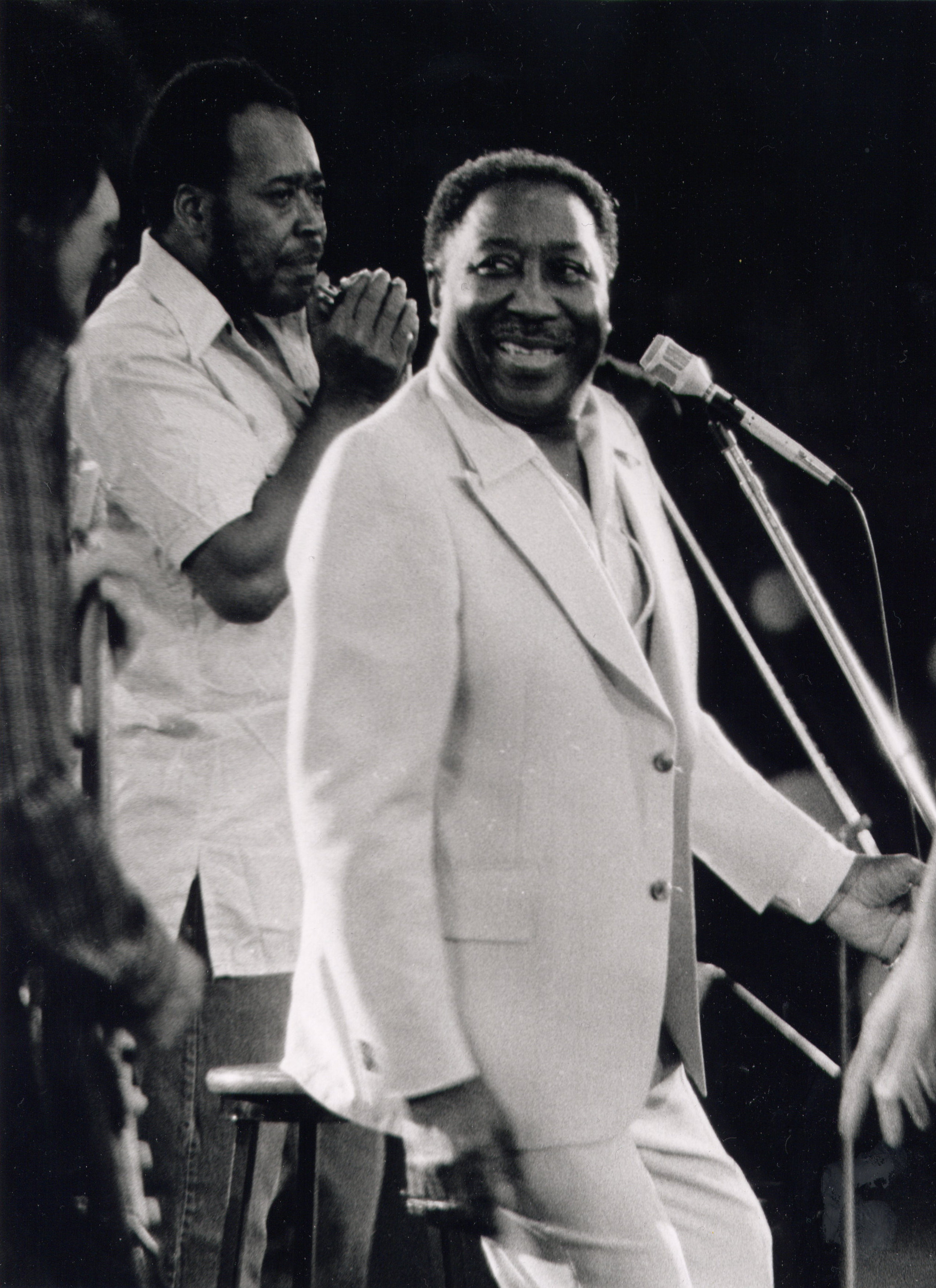
Muddy Waters, a major influence on the movement, pictured in 1971

Commentators often distinguish British rhythm and blues bands from beat bands (who were influenced by rock and roll and rockabilly) on the one hand, and, from "purist" British blues (which particularly emulated Chicago electric blues artists), on the other, although there was considerable crossover between the three sets of musicians. Merseybeat bands like the Beatles, or from the parallel beat scene in Manchester, were influenced by American forms of music that included rockabilly, girl groups and the early Motown sound, helping them to produce commercial orientated form of music that began to dominate the British charts from 1963. However, bands from the developing London club scene were mainly concerned to emulate black rhythm and blues performers, including the work of Chess Records' blues artists like Muddy Waters and Howlin' Wolf, but also wider rhythm and blues singer and rock and roll pioneers like Chuck Berry and Bo Diddley resulting in a "rawer" or "grittier" sound.

British rhythm and blues differed in tone from that of American artists, often with more emphasis on guitars and sometimes with greater energy. British rhythm and blues singers were criticised for their emulation of rhythm and blues vocal styles, with shouts, glottal stops, moans and cries. However, vocalists such as Van Morrison, Mick Jagger, Eric Burdon and Steve Winwood did not attempt to emulate a particular singer and were seen by critics as able to sing the blues convincingly and with some power. In cover versions of R&B songs, riffs were often simplified or used less frequently. The object of the music was usually to whip up energy, rather than to produce musical finesse. Many groups were based around guitars (rhythm, lead and bass) and drums and as a result arrangements tended to be guitar-oriented and at higher tempos than the originals. Amplification of guitars to the highest levels of underpowered amplifiers created the over-driven guitar sound that would become characteristic of rock music.

Nick Logan and Bob Woffinden noted that after the split of Blues Incorporated at the end of 1962, four main strands could be discerned in British Rhythm and Blues. Cyril Davies left to attempt to recreate the Chicago electric blues of Muddy Waters. The style would be the major influence on the later emergence of the blues boom, particularly through the work of John Mayall's Bluesbreakers. Alexis Korner continued with Blues Incorporated, bringing in jazz saxophonist Graham Bond and developing a more jazz orientated sound. This strand would be taken up by acts including the Graham Bond Organisation, Manfred Mann and Zoot Money. A unique form was pursued by Georgie Fame and the Blue Flames, who as the resident band at the Flamingo club on Wardour Street, unusual in having a predominantly black audience of American GIs and locals, also utilised jazz, but mixed R&B with elements of Caribbean music, including Ska and bluebeat. The Rolling Stones and others focused on rocking guitar music based on the work of Chuck Berry and Bo Diddley and would be followed by many small guitar and drum based groups, many of which would rapidly move into rock music.

== History ==
=== Origins ===
In the early 1950s blues music was largely known in Britain through blues-influenced boogie-woogie, and the jump blues of Fats Waller and Louis Jordan. Imported recordings of American artists were brought over by African American servicemen stationed in Britain during and after World War II, merchant seamen visiting the ports of London, Liverpool, Newcastle on Tyne and Belfast, and in a trickle of (illegal) imports. From 1955 major British record labels His Master's Voice and EMI (the latter, particularly through their subsidiary Decca Records), began to distribute American jazz and increasingly blues records to the emerging market.

Apart from recordings, occasional radio broadcasts were one of the few ways that British people could become familiar with the blues. A one-off broadcast by Josh White while he was visiting Britain in 1951 was so popular that he was asked to perform for a series of programmes for the BBC, eventually titled The Glory Road and broadcast in 1952. Later that year, folk song collector Alan Lomax, then resident in London, produced a series of three programmes under the title The Art of the Negro, of last of which, "Blues in the Mississippi Night" featured folk blues recordings by artists including Muddy Waters, Robert Johnson and John Lee Hooker and was the first introduction of many later followers of the blues to the music and hardships of life for African Americans in the Southern US. The next year the Jazz Club programme, hosted by Max Jones, included a recital of "Town and Country Blues", which played music by a wide range of blues artists.

=== Jazz ===
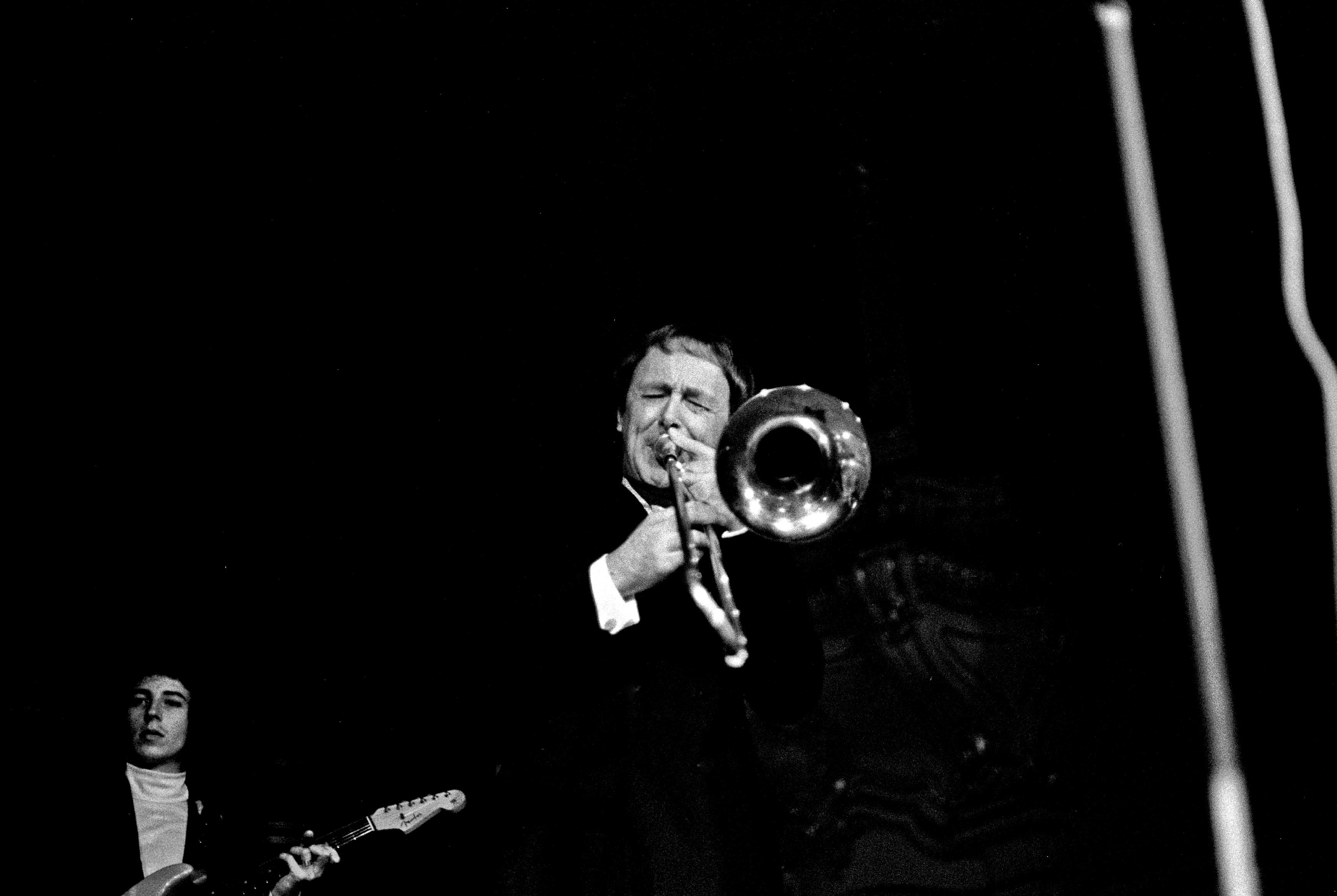
Chris Barber, one of the major figures in the early popularisation of the blues in Britain, playing at the Musikhalle, Hamburg, 1972

The British rhythm and blues scene developed in London out of the related jazz, skiffle and folk club scenes of the 1950s. The first of these scenes, that of jazz, had developed during the Second World War as a reaction to swing, consciously re-introducing older elements of American jazz, particularly that of New Orleans to produce trad jazz. This music incorporated elements of the blues and occasional blues-influenced singles reached the British Charts, including Humphrey Lyttelton's self-penned "Bad Penny Blues" (1956), the first jazz record to reach the British top 20.

British trad jazz band-leader Chris Barber was one of the major figures in the development and popularisation of rhythm and blues in Britain the 1950s. His interest in the blues would help foster both the skiffle craze and the development of electric rhythm and blues, as members of his dance band would be fundamental to both movements. He founded the National Jazz League partly as a means of popularising the blues, served as co-director of the National Jazz Federation and helped establish the Marquee Club, which would become one of the major venues for British R&B bands. He also brought over American folk and blues performers who found they were much better known and paid in Europe than America, a series of tours that began with Josh White and Big Bill Broonzy in 1951, and would include Brownie McGhee, Sonny Terry, Memphis Slim, Muddy Waters and Lonnie Johnson.

=== Skiffle ===
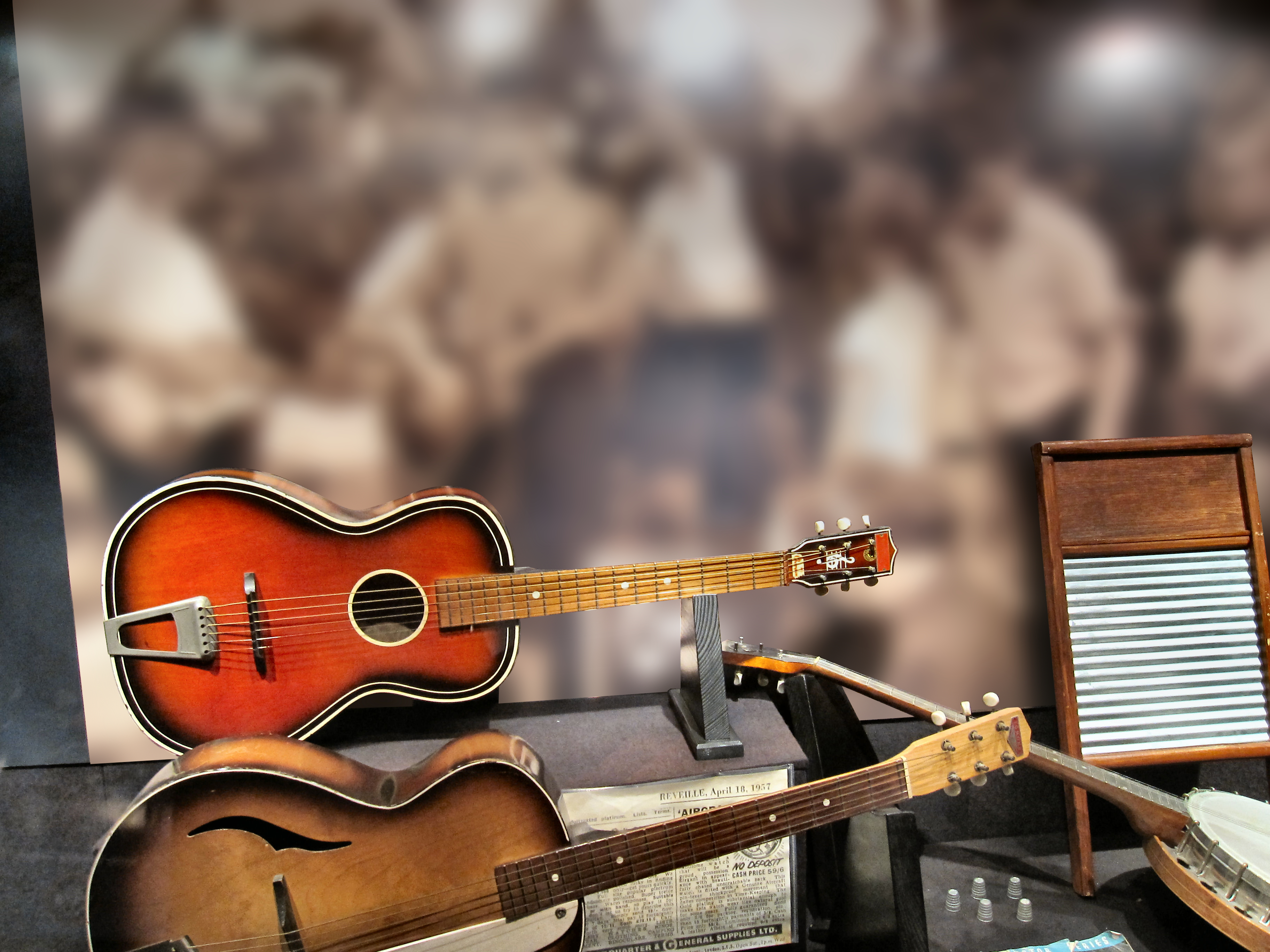
The instruments of the skiffle group the Quarrymen, who would become the Beatles

Lonnie Johnson played at the Royal Festival Hall in 1952 on a bill opened by a group led by the young Lonnie Donegan. Donegan became the key figure in the development of the British skiffle "craze", beginning in Ken Colyer's Jazzmen by playing American folk and blues songs, particularly those derived from the recordings of Huddie Leadbetter, during intervals to the accompaniment of guitar, washboard and tea-chest bass in a lively style that emulated American jug bands. After Colyer left in 1954 to form a new outfit, the band became Chris Barber's Jazz Band, and members of the band played "race blues" songs in concert intervals and recorded as the Lonnie Donegan Skiffle Group. They released their high-tempo version of Lead Belly's "Rock Island Line" in 1956 and it became a major hit, spending eight months in the Top 20, peaking at number six (and number eight in the US). It was the first début record to go gold in Britain, selling over a million copies worldwide. This stimulated the explosion of the British "skiffle craze" and it has been estimated that in the late 1950s there were 30,000–50,000 skiffle groups in Britain. Sales of guitars grew rapidly and groups performed on banjos, tea chest bass guitars and washboards in church halls, cafes and the flourishing coffee bars of Soho, London. In addition to members of the Beatles, a large number of British rhythm and blues musicians began their careers playing skiffle, including Van Morrison, Ronnie Wood, Mick Jagger and Roger Daltrey. The fashion created a demand for opportunities to play versions of American folk, blues and jazz music that would contribute to the growth of a club scene.

=== Folk ===
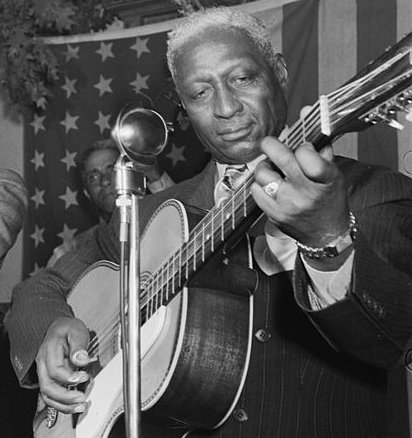
Lead Belly's recordings were major part of British R&B repertoires: he never performed in the UK

Until the mid-1950s in Britain the blues was seen as a form of folk music. When Broonzy toured England he played a folk blues set to fit British expectations of American blues, rather than his current electric Chicago blues. Skiffle clubs included the 'Ballad and Blues' club in a pub in Soho, co-founded by Ewan MacColl. In its early stages these clubs saw the playing of British and American folk music that included folk blues. As the skiffle craze subsided from the mid-1950s many of these clubs, following the lead of MacColl, began to shift towards the performance of English traditional folk material, partly as a reaction to the growth of American dominated pop and rock n' roll music, often banning American music from performances and became more exclusively English folk clubs.

The more traditional American folk blues continued to provide 1960s British groups with material, particularly after the emergence of Bob Dylan, who also popularised folk blues songs. In 1964, for example, the song-catalogue of Lead Belly provided the Animals with "The House of the Rising Sun", Manfred Mann with "John Hardy" and the Four Pennies with "Black Girl". British acoustic blues continued to develop as part of the folk scene. In the early 1960s, folk guitar pioneers Bert Jansch, John Renbourn and particularly Davy Graham, played blues, folk and jazz, developing a distinctive guitar style known as folk baroque. It continued with figures like Ian A. Anderson and his Country Blues Band, and Al Jones. Most British acoustic blues players could achieve little commercial success and found it difficult to gain recognition for their "imitations" of the blues in the US, being overshadowed by the rhythm and blues and electric blues that had emerged in the later 1950s.

=== Development ===
==== Blues Incorporated ====
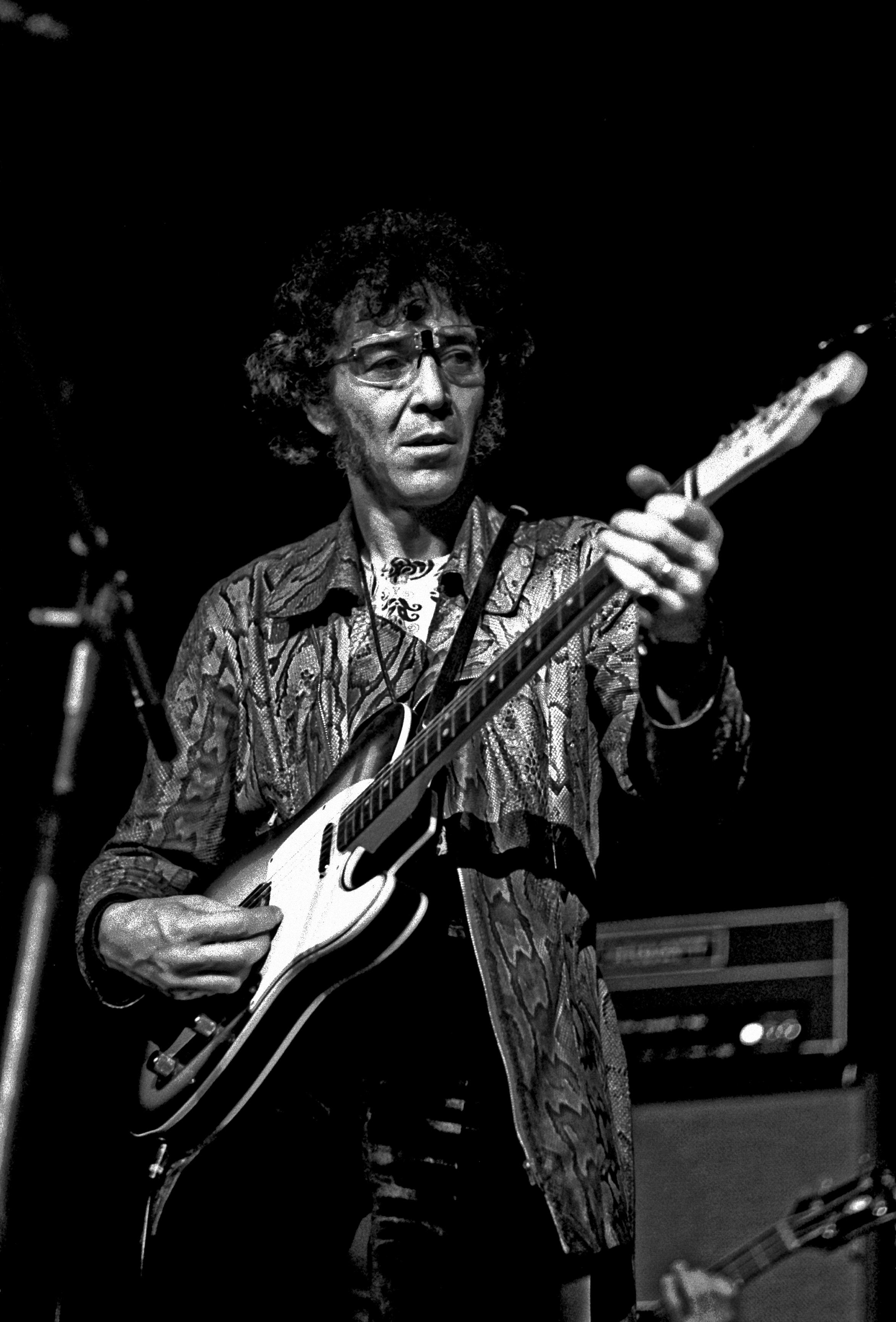
Alexis Korner in Hamburg in 1972

Blues harpist Cyril Davies ran the London Skiffle Club at the Roundhouse public house in London's Soho, which served as a focal point for British skiffle acts. Like guitarist Alexis Korner, he had worked for Chris Barber, playing in the R&B segment Barber introduced to his show and as part of the supporting band for visiting US artists. They began to play together as a duo and in 1957, deciding their central interest was blues, they closed the skiffle club and reopened a month later as the London Blues and Barrelhouse Club. It acted as a venue for visiting artists and their own performances. The visit of Muddy Waters in 1958 had a major impact on the duo and on the nature of British R&B in general. Initially British audiences were shocked by Waters's amplified electric blues, but he was soon playing to ecstatic crowds and receiving rave reviews. Where British blues had often emulated Delta blues and country blues in the emerging British folk revival, Davies and Korner, who had supported Waters on tour, now began to play high-powered electric blues, forming the band Blues Incorporated.

Blues Incorporated had a fluid line up and became a clearing house for British rhythm and blues musicians in the later 1950s and early 1960s. These included future members of the Rolling Stones, the Yardbirds, Manfred Mann and the Kinks; beside Graham Bond and Long John Baldry. As well as acting as a mentor to these figures and others, including John Mayall and Jimmy Page, Korner was also a historian, writer and record collector pivotal in the growth of the movement, and often referred to as "the father of British blues". Blues Incorporated established a regular "Rhythm and Blues Night" at the Ealing Jazz Club and were given a residency at the Marquee Club, from which in 1962 they took the name of the first British blues album, R&B from the Marquee (Decca), but Korner and Davies had split over the issue of including horn sections in the Blues Incorporated sound before its release. Korner continued with various line-ups for Blues Incorporated, while Davies went on to form his R&B All Stars.

==== Expansion of the scene ====
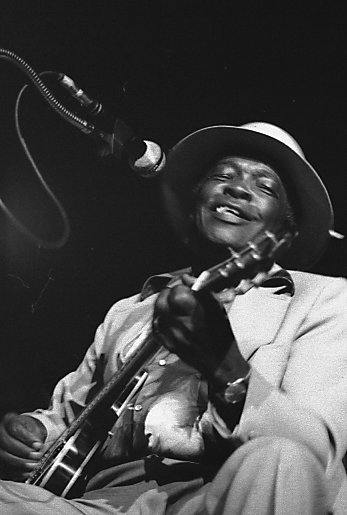
John Lee Hooker, whose visit to England was the anticipated R&B event of 1964, shown in 1978

Early British rhythm and blues bands like Blues Incorporated found that folk clubs would not accept amplified blues performances. However, many London trad jazz clubs moved over to the style. In addition to the Roundhouse and the Marquee in central London, these included The Flamingo, the Crawdaddy Club, Richmond, where the Rolling Stones first began to gain attention, Klooks Kleek, The Ealing Club and the Eel Pie Island Hotel. Blues clubs were appearing in the capital at such a rate that in 1963 Melody Maker declared London "The New Chicago!". The scene soon began to spread out beyond London, particularly into East Anglia and the Midlands, with clubs in Norwich and Birmingham adopting the genre. Jazz bands also followed suit, with the Mike Cotton Jazz Band becoming the Mike Cotton Sound, Warwick's Tony and the Talons becoming the Original Roadrunners and Burton on Trent's Atlantix becoming Rhythm and Blues Incorporated.

From 1962 demand for blues recordings in Britain and Europe led to new outlets for American recordings, Chicago recordings that were now available included Vee Jay Records through EMI's Stateside label and Chess Records through Pye International's R&B series. These records were enthusiastically sought and collected by a new generation of enthusiasts. The increasing appetite for rhythm and blues was reflected in the growing numbers of Afro-American artists visiting the country. From 1962 the American Folk Blues Festival, organised by German promoters Horst Lippmann and Fritz Rau, brought American blues stars including Waters, Wolf, Sonny Boy Williamson, and John Lee Hooker to the country. In 1964 the American Folk Blues and Gospel Caravan arrived in the UK for an 11-date tour, including in its line-up Sister Rosetta Tharpe, Blind Gary Davis, Sonny Terry, Muddy Waters and Otis Spann. The original dates sold out rapidly and six more had to be added. Later that year, the first of what was to become the annual National Jazz and Blues Festival was held at Reading in Berkshire.

==== Peak ====
1964 was the year of most rapid expansion and the peak of the British R&B boom. It has been estimated that there were 300 rhythm and blues bands in England at the beginning of the year and over 2,000 by the end. In June 1964 John Lee Hooker's 1956 "Dimples" reached number 23 on the UK charts during a stay of 10 weeks. The song was chosen by the Spencer Davis Group as their May 1964 debut single and the Animals covered it on their first album. Howling Wolf's "Smokestack Lightning", released in the UK by Pye International Records that year, peaked at number 42 in the singles chart and was covered by the Yardbirds, Manfred Mann, the Animals and the Who. On 5 December 1964 the Rolling Stones version of Willie Dixon's "Little Red Rooster", based on Howlin' Wolf's 1961 version and recorded at Chess Records in Chicago, topped the UK chart for one week. Willie Dixon-penned songs would continue to be covered by British artists.

=== Major acts ===
==== The Rolling Stones ====
The most commercially successful act in the genre, were the Rolling Stones. Keith Richards and Mick Jagger, who had renewed their childhood association after discovering a shared interest in R&B records, were introduced to guitarist Brian Jones through Alexis Korner, after a Blues Incorporated gig at the Ealing Jazz Club. Blues Incorporated contained two other future members of the Rolling Stones: Ian Stewart and Charlie Watts. Formed in London in 1962, Jones took their name from a track on the cover of a Muddy Waters album and they abandoned blues purism before their line-up solidified to focus on a wide range of rhythm and blues artists. They debuted at The Marquee and soon gained a residency at the Crawdaddy Club, building up a reputation as a live act. They signed a recording contract with Decca and their first single was a cover of Chuck Berry's "Come On" released in June 1963. Despite its being virtually unpromoted by the band or the record company, their reputation among R&B fans helped it reached number 21 on the UK singles chart.

They produced their first album, The Rolling Stones, in 1964, which largely consisted of rhythm and blues standards. Following in the wake of the Beatles' national and then international success, the Rolling Stones established themselves as the second most popular UK band and joined the British Invasion of the American record charts as leaders of a second wave of R&B oriented bands. In addition to Chicago blues numbers, the Rolling Stones also covered songs by Chuck Berry and Bobby and Shirley Womack, the latter's, "It's All Over Now", giving them their first UK number one in 1964. After the success of their cover of "Little Red Rooster" in 1964, the song-writing partnership between Jagger and Richards gradually began to dominate the band's output, giving them their breakthrough international hit "(I Can't Get No) Satisfaction (1965), a song which borrowed phrases and rhythms from R&B standards, and would be covered by both Otis Redding and Aretha Franklin. The importance of the writing partnership contributed to the marginalisation of Jones and marked a shift away from R&B material. They would investigate a series of new musical styles in their long career, but blues songs and influences continued to surface in the Rolling Stones' music.

==== Other London bands ====
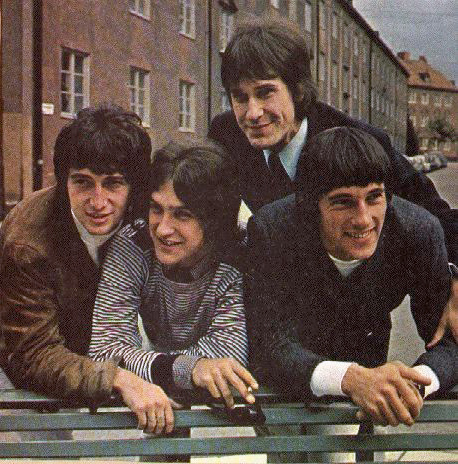
The original line up of the Kinks, 1965

Other London-based bands that pursued a similar course to the Rolling Stones included the Yardbirds, the Kinks, the Downliners Sect, the Pretty Things, Gary Farr and the T-Bones and Pink Floyd. The Yardbirds began as the Metropolis Blues Quartet. By 1963 they had acquired Eric Clapton as a lead guitarist and were acting as the backing band for Sonny Boy Williamson on his British tour. They earned a formidable reputation as a live act, developing frantic improvised guitar–harmonica "rave-ups", but they enjoyed only modest success with singles based on R&B covers. In 1965 they cut the more pop-oriented single "For Your Love", which made the top 10 in the UK and US, but the move away from the blues prompted Clapton to quit the band for a stint with John Mayall's Bluesbreakers and then to form Cream. His replacement Jeff Beck (and eventually his replacement Jimmy Page), saw the band enjoy a series of transatlantic hits and to go on to become pioneers of psychedelic rock.

After an early lack of success with R&B standards, the Kinks enjoyed their breakthrough with the single "You Really Got Me" (1964). Influenced by the Kingsmen's version of "Louie, Louie", it reached number one in the UK and the top 10 in the US. The follow-up "All Day and All of the Night" (1964) reached number two in the US, while the band also released two full-length albums and several EPs in this period.

The Downliners Sect formed in 1963, and developed a strong reputation in London clubs, but had less commercial success than many of their contemporaries. The Pretty Things had UK hits with "Don't Bring Me Down" (1964) and the self penned "Honey I Need" (1965), which both reached the top twenty, but they failed to break into the American market and would be chiefly remembered for their later psychedelic work. Pink Floyd began as a rhythm and blues outfit, the Tea Set, adopting a new name based on those of blues musicians Floyd Council and Pink Anderson and playing London blues clubs from 1966. By the time they began to record they had already moved on to psychedelic compositions and jams that would make them a central feature of the emerging London Underground scene.

==== Provincial groups ====
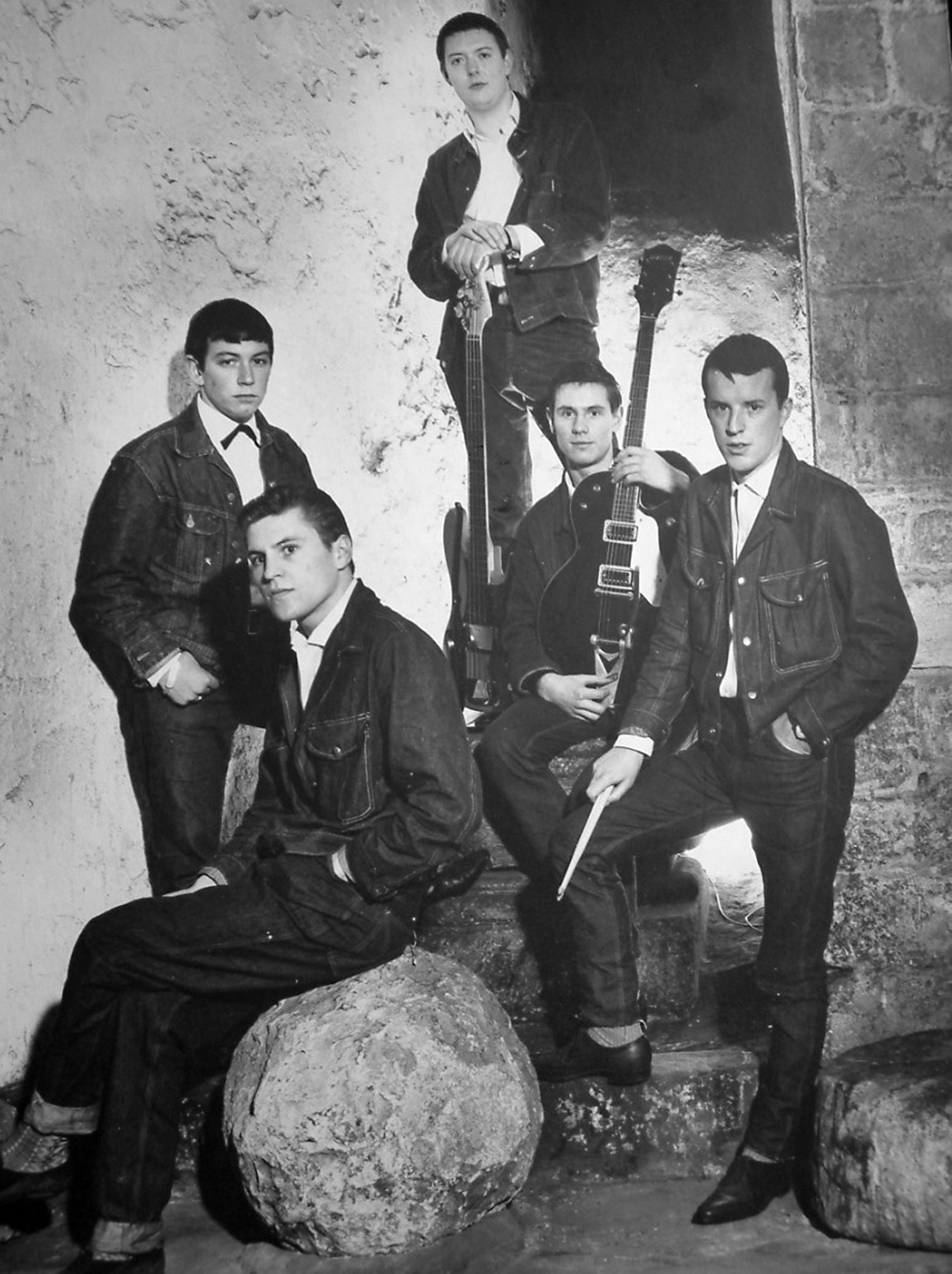
The Animals in 1964

Bands to emerge from other major British cities included the Animals from Newcastle, Them from Belfast and the Spencer Davis Group and the Moody Blues from Birmingham. None of these bands played exclusively rhythm and blues, often relying on sources that included Brill Building and girl group songs for their hit singles, but it remained at the core of their early albums. The Animals' sound was characterised by the keyboards of Alan Price and the powerful vocals of Eric Burdon. They moved to London in 1964 and released a series of successful singles, beginning with transatlantic hit "House of the Rising Sun", mixing more commercial folk and soul, while their albums were dominated by blues standards. Them, with their vocalist and multi-instrumentalist Van Morrison, had a series of hits with "Baby, Please Don't Go" (1964), which reached number 10 in the UK, and "Here Comes the Night" (1965), which charted at number 2 in the UK and made the top 40 in the US, but perhaps their most enduring legacy was the B-side "Gloria", which became a garage rock standard. The Spencer Davis Group had their first UK number one with the Jackie Edwards penned "Keep on Running" (1965), but became largely a vehicle for the young keyboard player and vocalist Steve Winwood, who at only 18 co-wrote "Gimme Some Lovin'" (1967) and "I'm a Man" (1967), both of which reached the Billboard 100 top 10 and became R&B standards. The Moody Blues had only one major R&B hit with a cover of "Go Now" (1964), which reached number one in the UK and number ten in the US. Subsequent singles failed to penetrate the top 20 and hardly broke the top 100 in the US, marking a steep decline in the band's fortunes. However, they would return after line-up changes to be one of the most important psychedelic rock bands and a major influence on progressive rock.

==== Mod groups ====
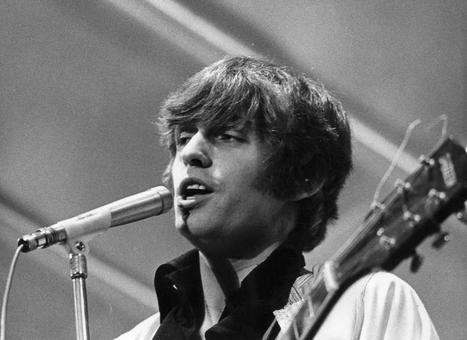
Georgie Fame, leader of one of the most widely influenced R&B groups, in 1968

The British Mod subculture, which was at its height in 1965 and 1966, was musically centred on rhythm and blues and later soul music, but the artists that performed the original music were not available in small London clubs around which the scene was based. British R&B bands like the Stones, Yardbirds and Kinks had a following among mods but a large number of specifically mod bands also emerged to fill this gap. These included the Small Faces, the Creation, the Action, the Smoke, John's Children and most successfully the Who. The Who's early promotional material tagged them as producing "maximum rhythm and blues", but by about 1966 they moved from attempting to emulate American R&B to producing songs that reflected the Mod lifestyle. Many of these bands were able to enjoy cult and then national success in the UK, but found it difficult to break into the American market. Only the Who managed, after some difficulty, to produce a significant US following, particularly after their appearances at the Monterey Pop Festival (1967) and Woodstock (1969).

==== Jazz-influenced acts ====
Among more jazz-influenced acts the Organisation were led by Graham Bond's organ and saxophone playing and gruff vocals. Their rhythm section of Jack Bruce and Ginger Baker would go on to form Cream with Eric Clapton in 1967. Manfred Mann had a much smoother sound and one of the most highly rated vocalists in the scene in Paul Jones. They enjoyed their first success with covers of girl group songs "Do Wah Diddy Diddy" (1964) and "Sha La La" (1964), the first of which reached number one in both the UK and the US, but largely stuck to rhythm and blues standards on their albums. Zoot Money, whose Big Roll Band mixed R&B, soul, rock and roll and jazz, and was one of the most popular live acts of the era, made little impact in terms of record sales, but is noted for the later successes of its members, including guitarist Andy Summers, pianist Dave Greenslade, drummer Jon Hiseman, bassist Tony Reeves and saxophonist Clive Burrows. Georgie Fame and the Blue Flames mixed jazz, ska and bluebeat into his music and had three number one singles in the UK, beginning with "Yeh Yeh" (1965).

==== African-Caribbean and Afro-American artists ====
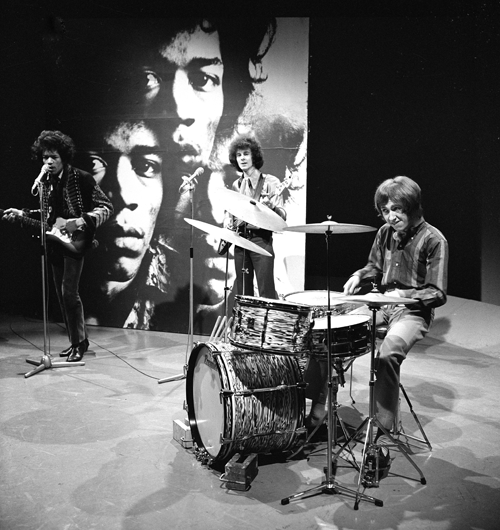
The Jimi Hendrix Experience performing on Dutch television in 1967

A number of visiting black stars became part of the British R&B scene. These included Geno Washington, an American singer stationed in England with the Air Force. He was invited to join what became Geno Washington & the Ram Jam Band by guitarist Pete Gage in 1965 and enjoyed top 40 hit singles and two top 10 albums before the band split up in 1969. Another American GI, Herbie Goins, sang with Blues Incorporated before leading his own band, the Nightimers. Jimmy James, born in Jamaica, moved to London after two local number one hits with the Vagabonds in 1960 and built a strong reputation as a live act, releasing a live album and their debut The New Religion in 1966 and achieving moderate success with singles before the original Vagabonds broke up in 1970. Champion Jack Dupree was a New Orleans blues and boogie woogie pianist, who toured Europe and settled there from 1960, living in Switzerland and Denmark, then in Halifax, England in the 1970s and 1980s, before finally settling in Germany.

The most significant and successful visiting artist was Jimi Hendrix who in early 1966, after years on the chitlin circuit as sideman for major R&B acts as well as playing in bands in New York, was invited to England to record as a solo artist by former Animals bassist Chas Chandler. With Mitch Mitchell on drums and Noel Redding on bass, the band formed around him as the Jimi Hendrix Experience became major stars in the UK, with three top ten hits in early 1967. it was followed later that year by the psychedelic album Are You Experienced [sic], which became a major hit in the US after Hendrix's triumphant return at the Monterey Pop Festival and made him one of the major figures of late 60s rock.

==== Solo artists ====
A number of solo artists who emerged from the British R&B scene would go on to highly successful careers in the later 1960s and 1970s. These included Long John Baldry, Rod Stewart and Elton John. After the dissolution of Blues Incorporated in 1962 Long John Baldry joined the Cyril Davies R&B All Stars, and after Davies' death in early 1964 took over leadership of the group, renaming it Long John Baldry and His Hoochie Coochie Men. The band featured Rod Stewart as a second vocalist, with whom Baldry formed short lived proto-supergroup Steampacket in 1965. Baldry moved on to front Bluesology, which had originally been formed as an R&B band in 1962 by teenage keyboardist Reggie Dwight, later better known as Elton John. Baldry enjoyed his greatest success with pop ballads, beginning with "Let the Heartaches Begin" (1967), which reached number one in Britain, but, despite supporting the Beatles and the Rolling Stones, he remained virtually unknown outside of the UK. After Steampacket dissolved in 1966, Rod Stewart joined blues-rock combo Shotgun Express and then the Jeff Beck Group, and when that broke up in 1969 he moved on to the Small Faces, which became the Faces, and also began to pursue his solo career, mixing R&B with rock and folk, to become one of the most successful British solo artists of the 1970s. Elton John, taking his first name from Bluesology saxophonist Elton Dean and his last from John Baldry, formed a partnership with lyricist Bernie Taupin in 1968 and after writing hits for major pop artists embarked on a solo career that would be the most commercially successful of the early 1970s and one of the most sustained in pop music.

==== British blues boom ====
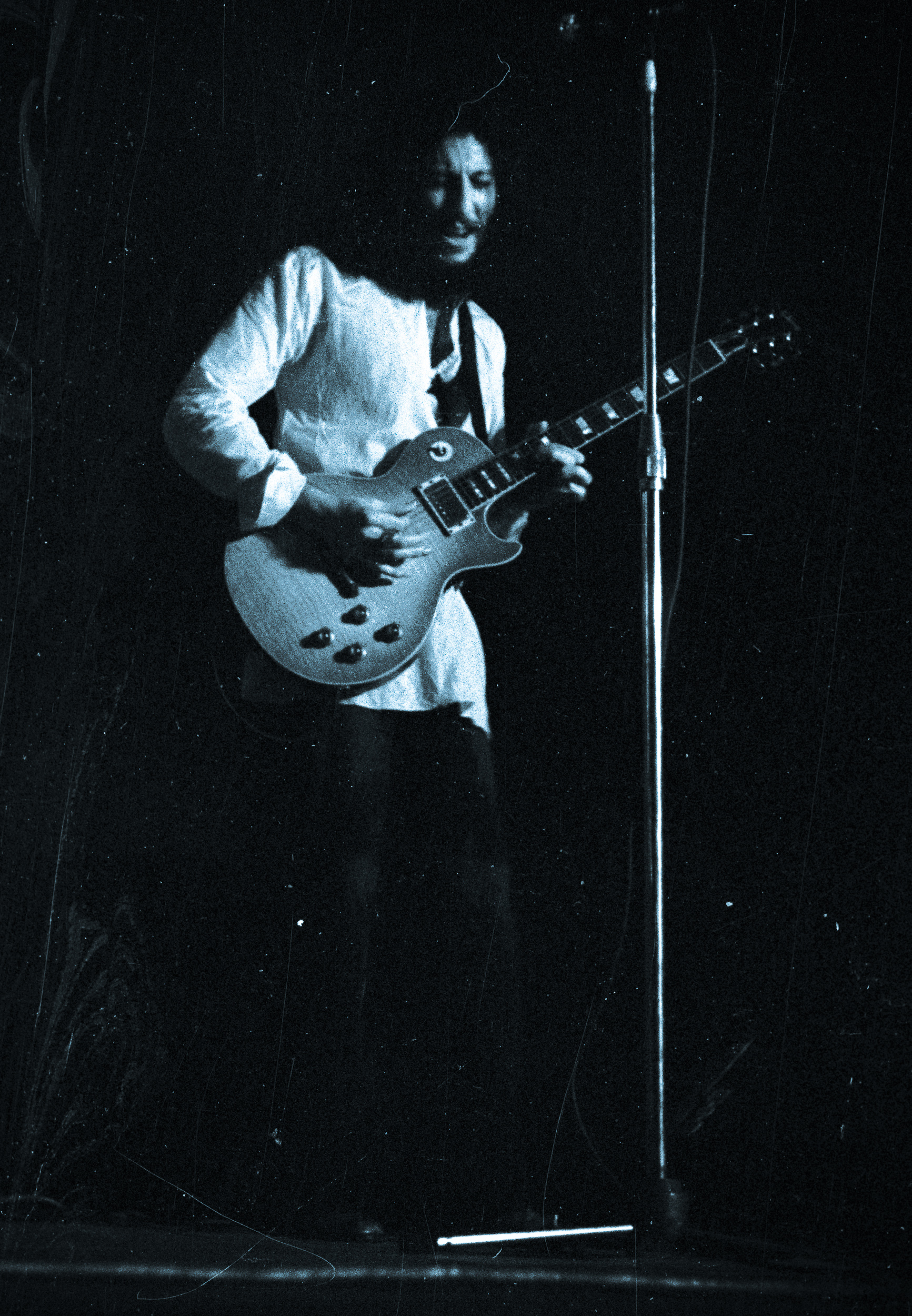
Peter Green of Fleetwood Mac onstage in 1970

The wider rhythm and blues boom overlapped, both chronologically and in terms of personnel, with the later and more narrowly focused British blues boom. The blues boom began to come to prominence in the mid-1960s as the rhythm and blues movement began to peter out leaving a nucleus of instrumentalists with a wide knowledge of blues forms and techniques. Central to the blues boom were John Mayall & the Bluesbreakers, who began to gain national and international attention after the release of Blues Breakers with Eric Clapton (Beano) album (1966), considered one of the seminal British blues recordings. Peter Green started a "second great epoch of British blues", as he replaced Clapton in the Bluesbreakers after Clapton's departure to form Cream.

In 1967, after one record with the Bluesbreakers, Green, with the Bluesbreakers' rhythm section Mick Fleetwood and John McVie, formed Peter Green's Fleetwood Mac. Mike Vernon, who had produced the "Beano" album set up the Blue Horizon record label and signed Fleetwood Mac and other emerging blues acts. Other major acts included Free, Ten Years After, and Duster Bennett. Fleetwood Mac's eponymous début album reached the UK top 5 in early 1968 and as the instrumental "Albatross" reached number one in the single charts in early 1969. Chicken Shack, formed at the peak of the boom in 1965 by Stan Webb, were unusual in having a female vocalist and keyboard player in Christine Perfect. They had a British hit with Etta James' R&B classic "I'd Rather Go Blind" in 1969, before Perfect left to join her husband John McVie in Fleetwood Mac, but remained largely focused on blues standards. The band then suffered a series of line-up changes and, although managing a comeback on the club circuit, they never achieved another mainstream breakthrough and split up in 1973. The last years of the 1960s were, as Scott Schinder and Andy Schwartz put it, "the commercial apex of the British blues boom".

=== Decline ===
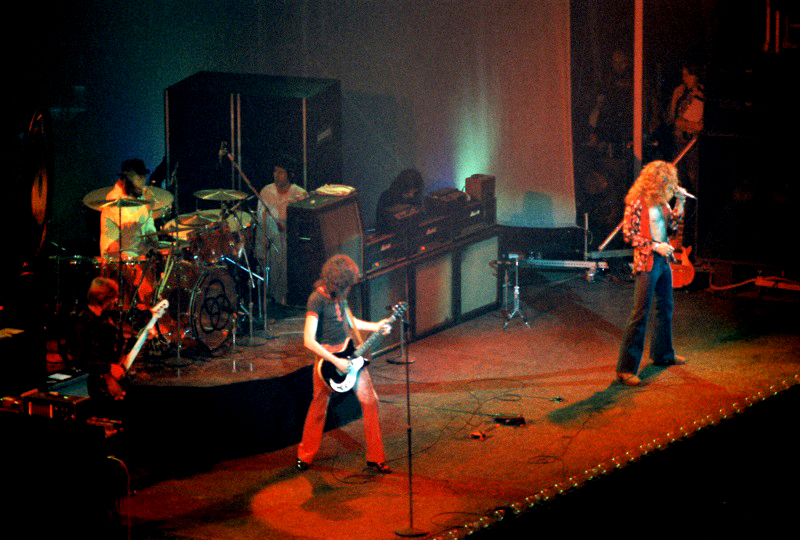
Led Zeppelin performing at Chicago Stadium in January 1975

By 1967 most of the surviving major British R&B acts had moved away from covers and R&B-inspired music to psychedelic rock, and from there they would shift into new subgenres. Some, like Jethro Tull followed bands like the Moody Blues away from 12-bar structures and harmonicas into complex, classical-influenced progressive rock. Members of the next generation of blues-based bands, including Led Zeppelin, Deep Purple and Black Sabbath, played a loud form of blues-influenced rock, would lead to the development of hard rock and ultimately heavy metal. Some, like Mayall, continued to play a "pure" form of the blues, but largely outside of mainstream notice. The structure of clubs, venues and festivals that had grown up in the late 1950s and early 1960s in Britain virtually disappeared in the 1970s. By 1970 British rhythm and blues had virtually ceased to exist as an active genre. Rhythm and blues bands began to find it very difficult to achieve serious album sales, even in the UK. Vinegar Joe, formed in 1971 around the vocals of Elkie Brooks and Robert Palmer and the instrumental talents of Pete Gage and Steve York, despite popular stage performances, broke up after only three albums with disappointing sales two years later.

=== Revivals ===
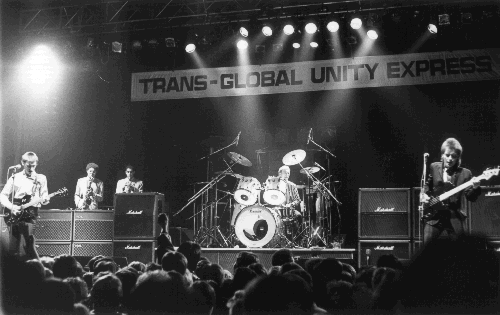
The Jam in Newcastle-upon-Tyne in 1982

British R&B continued to be played in the Northern Soul club scene, where early soul records, particularly those of Motown, were highly prized. There were also bands on the London pub rock circuit. Occasional R&B-based pub rock acts like Dr Feelgood managed to build a following through tireless touring. They topped the British charts with live album Stupidity (1976), but failed to make a significant impact in the US.

==== 1970s ====
With the rise of disco music, British soul music became popular in the mid-late 1970s. A handful of pub rock acts managed to achieve mainstream success after the advent of punk rock, often being re-categorised as new wave music, including Graham Parker and the Rumour, Nick Lowe, Squeeze and Elvis Costello. London-based R&B pub rock bands received a major boost when the Jam kicked off the mod revival in 1977 with their debut album In the City, which mixed R&B standards with originals modelled on the Who's early singles. They confirmed their status as the leading mod revival band with their third album All Mod Cons (1978), on which Paul Weller's song-writing drew heavily on the British-focused narratives of the Kinks. Pub rock bands like Red Beans and Rice, the Little Roosters, the Inmates, Nine Below Zero and Eddie and the Hot Rods, became major acts in the growing mod revival scene in London. Other bands grew up to feed the desire for mod music, often combining the music of '60s mod groups with elements of punk music, including the Lambrettas, the Merton Parkas, Squire, and Purple Hearts. These acts managed to develop cult followings and some had pop hits, before the revival petered out in the early '80s. In 1979, Dave Kelly, who had been a member of the John Dummer Blues Band formed the Blues Band with ex-Manfred Mann vocalist Paul Jones and Gary Fletcher, who continued to tour and record rhythm and blues into the new millennium.

==== 1980s ====
Paul Weller broke up the Jam in 1982 and formed the Style Council, who abandoned most of the elements of punk to adopt music much more based in R&B and early soul. Some major figures of the movement, including Robert Palmer and Steve Winwood, re-emerged as solo artists in the early 1980s, being as defined as blue-eyed soul singers.

During the 1980s and 1990s, musicians, particularly African Americans, mixed pop with disco like beats and high tech electronic production to produce the new genre of contemporary R&B, adding elements of other genres, including funk, hip hop, and soul music.

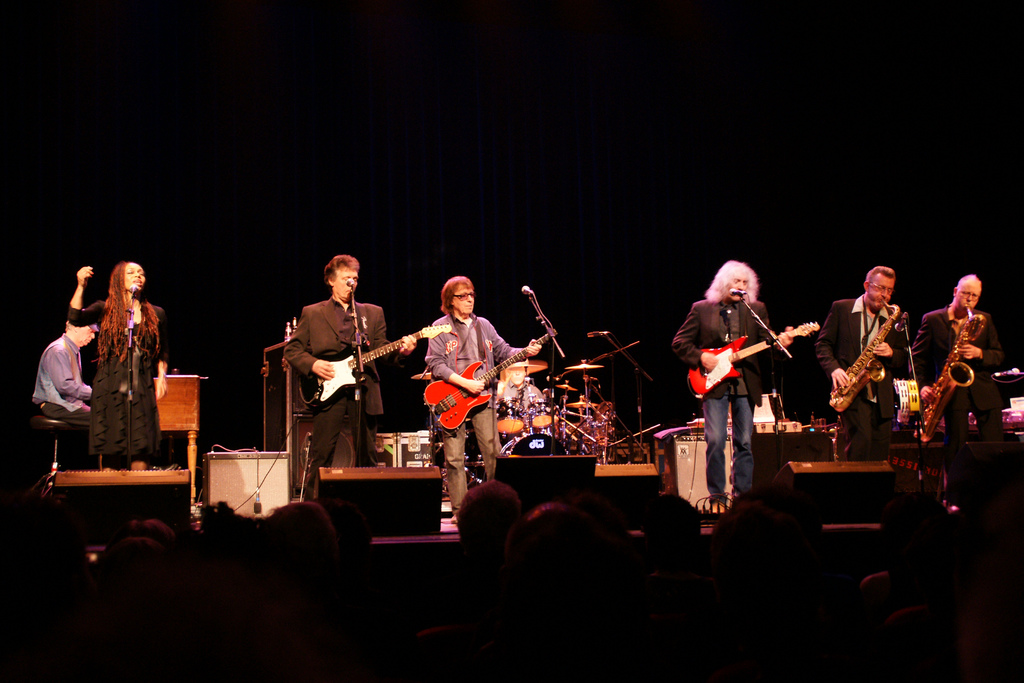
Bill Wyman's Rhythm Kings at Middelburg in 2009

==== 1990s ====
Roots music, including rhythm and blues, began to enjoy another resurgence of interest towards the end of the 1980s and in the 1990s. Annual blues festivals were established, including The Great British Rhythm and Blues Festival, held at Colne in Lancashire from 1989, which hosts both US and British R&B acts. In 1994, Jools Holland, former keyboard player with Squeeze and presenter of the TV show Later... with Jools Holland, reshaped his backing band as Jools Holland's Rhythm and Blues Orchestra and, as well as supporting him on the show, they embarked on a series of tours. After leaving the Rolling Stones in 1997, Bill Wyman formed the Rhythm Kings, which featured guitarists Peter Frampton and Albert Lee as well former Procol Harum keyboardist Gary Brooker, touring and producing a series of R&B based albums. By 2000, the fanzine Blues Matters! had managed to become a regular glossy magazine.

==== 2000s–2010s ====
In the 2000s, British artists began to enjoy success with the genre, including Craig David and Estelle. Much of the music produced by modern British R&B artists tend to incorporate electropop sounds, as exemplified by artists such as Jay Sean and Taio Cruz. In the 2000s, there was success in the US for British female artists who mixed soul music with elements of rhythm and blues, including Amy Winehouse, Duffy, Leona Lewis and Adele, leading to talk of another British Invasion, known as the "Third British Invasion", "R&B British Invasion" or "British Soul Invasion". Ella Mai won three awards at the 2019 Billboard Music Awards, including Top R&B Artist.

== Significance ==
Because of the very different circumstances from which they came, and in which they played, the rhythm and blues produced by British artists was very different in tone from that created by African Americans, often with more emphasis on guitars and sometimes with greater energy. They have been criticised for exploiting the massive catalogue of African American music, but it has also been noted that they both popularised that music, bringing it to British, world and in some cases American audiences, and helping to build the reputation of existing and past rhythm and blues artists. In order to sustain their careers most British R&B artists soon moved on from recording and performing American standards to writing and recording their own music. Many from the 60s helped pioneer psychedelic, and eventually progressive, hard rock and heavy metal, mixing in elements of world, folk and classical music. Others from the 1970s and 1980s, helped shape new wave and post-punk music and had a major impact on later genres, including Britpop. As a result, British rhythm and blues has been a major component of the sound of rock music.

== UK chart hits ==
This table lists recordings by British groups that made Record Retailer magazine's chart in the early 1960s, of material previously recorded by American rhythm and blues musicians:

Month entered UK singles chart	Band	Title	Position reached	Originally by
March 1963	The Big Three	"Some Other Guy"	37	Richie Barrett
May 1963	Freddie and the Dreamers	"If You Gotta Make a Fool of Somebody"	3	James Ray
June 1963	The Searchers	"Sweets for My Sweet"	1	The Drifters
July 1963	The Rolling Stones	"Come On"	21	Chuck Berry
July 1963	Brian Poole and the Tremeloes	"Twist and Shout"	4	The Top Notes (original version); The Isley Brothers (US hit version)
August 1963	The Hollies	"Searchin'"	12	The Coasters
September 1963	Brian Poole and the Tremeloes	"Do You Love Me"	1	The Contours
October 1963	Dave Berry and the Cruisers	"Memphis Tennessee"	19	Chuck Berry
November 1963	The Hollies	"Stay"	8	Maurice Williams and the Zodiacs
November 1963	Bern Elliott and the Fenmen	"Money (That's What I Want)"	14	Barrett Strong
January 1964	Dave Berry and the Cruisers	"My Baby Left Me"	37	Arthur Crudup
January 1964	The Paramounts	"Poison Ivy"	35	The Coasters
February 1964	The Hollies	"Just One Look"	2	Doris Troy
May 1964	Lulu and the Luvvers	"Shout"	7	The Isley Brothers
May 1964	The Dennisons	"Walking the Dog"	36	Rufus Thomas
June 1964	The Animals	"House of the Rising Sun"	1	Lead Belly also many other recordings
July 1964	The Rolling Stones	"It's All Over Now"	1	The Valentinos
July 1964	Manfred Mann	"Do Wah Diddy Diddy"	1	The Exciters
November 1964	The Rolling Stones	"Little Red Rooster"	1	Howlin' Wolf
November 1964	The Yardbirds	"Good Morning Little Schoolgirl"	44	Sonny Boy Williamson I
December 1964	The Moody Blues	"Go Now"	1	Bessie Banks
January 1965	The Animals	"Don't Let Me Be Misunderstood"	3	Nina Simone
January 1965	Them	"Baby, Please Don't Go"	10	Big Joe Williams
February 1965	The Spencer Davis Group	"Every Little Bit Hurts"	41	Brenda Holloway
March 1965	The Animals	"Bring It On Home to Me"	7	Sam Cooke
May 1965	The Birds	"Leaving Here"	45	Eddie Holland

== See also ==
- Blues rock
- British blues
- British soul
- Category:British rhythm and blues boom musicians
