= Geoff Bradford (musician) =

English guitarist (1934–2014)

- Born: Geoffrey Frank Bradford; 13 January 1934; Islington, England
- Died: 24 March 2014 (aged 80) Enfield, England
- Genres: Blues, British blues, skiffle, blues rock, folk rock
- Occupations: Guitarist, singer
- Years active: 1954–2014

Geoffrey Frank Bradford (13 January 1934 – 24 March 2014) was an English guitarist who played alongside British blues musicians in the 1950s and 1960s, such as Long John Baldry and Alexis Korner.

== Early life and influences ==
Bradford was born in Islington, England, and went to school in East Barnet. From the age of 14 he took piano lessons, playing transcriptions of Meade Lux Lewis and Albert Ammons; although he soon lost interest in the instrument, exposure to blues music left a lasting impression on him.

After leaving school, he briefly obtained a position in an insurance office, before signed on for the Navy as a stoker-engineer when he was 17 years old. In 1954, whilst on leave, he met and married his wife Jean. During his service with the Navy, Bradford visited Sicily and bought his first guitar. Bradford bought himself out of the Navy, then worked briefly as a baker and butcher, before obtaining a position as a screen printer.

== Early musical career ==
He joined a skiffle group called the Sunrisers, and initially emulated the work of Big Bill Broonzy and Bo Diddley. Eventually, he placed an advertisement in the Melody Maker for other blues players, and one of the respondents was Keith Scott. Bradford and Scott appeared as a duo at The Roundhouse blues club, which was run by Cyril Davies and Alexis Korner. This is not the famous Roundhouse at Chalk Farm in London's Camden Town. The one mentioned here was a pub on the corner of Wardour Street and Brewer Street, which was London's "Skiffle Centre" until 1956, when Cyril Davies and Alexis Korner started the London Blues and Barrelhouse Club. The Thursday night sessions often took the form of impromptu jams amongst the blues enthusiasts present and were visited by touring American bluesmen such as Muddy Waters, Otis Spann, and Big Bill Broonzy. The Rolling Stones also played there in their early days. The Roundhouse was recently open as The O Bar.

== Blues By Six ==
Bradford and Scott formed the band, Blues By Six, with Brian Knight on vocals and harmonica, Charlie Watts on drums and Peter Andrews on bass. The band played a form of Chicago blues, with Bradford's guitar work now inspired by T-Bone Walker and Willie Johnson.

== The R&B All-Stars ==
Cyril Davies had formed a successful Chicago blues band named the R&B All-Stars; original guitarist Bernie Watson left, and Davies asked Bradford to replace him. The band had a residency at the Marquee Club in Wardour Street, London. The band released a single on Pye, "Preachin' The Blues" / "Sweet Mary".

== Later career ==
The R&B All-Stars were at the forefront of a wave of British Blues bands at the beginning of the 1960s; other groups that were part of the wave included The Yardbirds, Manfred Mann and The Rolling Stones. However Davies died, and the R&B All-Stars became the Hoochie Coochie Men, fronted by Davies's backup singer, Long John Baldry. The blues boom evolved into what would become rock, and the music of the Hoochie Coochie Men failed to evolve with the times. As a result, Bradford faded from the view of the general public.

He recorded infrequently, most recently in 1995. Bradford also appeared on the video Masters of British Guitar, and on the film, Living with the Blues on Channel Four.

== Discography ==
- Geoff Bradford and the Hoochie Coochie Men – Geoff's Blues (1965)
- Geoff Bradford – The Right String (1976) Black Lion Records
- Geoff Bradford – Rockin' the Blues (1979) Black Lion Records
- Geoff Bradford – Tribute to Fats Waller (1985)
- Loren Auerbach with Richard Newman (and Bert Jansch) - Playing the Game (1985)
- Geoff Bradford – Magnolia (1986) Christabel Records
- Geoff Bradford – The Return of a Guitar Legend (1995) BGO Records

== Bibliography ==
- Bob Brunning (1986): Blues: The British Connection, Londra 2002 – Helter Skelter ISBN 1-900924-41-2
- Eric Burdon con J. Marshall Craig: Don't Let Me Be Misunderstood, New York 2001 – Thunder's Mouth Press
- Dick Heckstall-Smith: (2004) The Safest Place in the World: A personal history of British rhythm and blues, Clear Books ISBN 0-7043-2696-5
- Christopher Hjort (with foreword of John Mayall): Strange brew: Eric Clapton and the British blues boom 1965–1970, Jawbone, 2007 ISBN 1-906002-00-2
- Paul Myers: It Ain't Easy: Long John Baldry and the Birth of the British Blues, Vancouver Canada 2007 – GreyStone Books
- Harry Shapiro: Alexis Korner: The Biography, Bloomsbury Publishing PLC, Londra 1997 with discography of Mark Troster ISBN 0-7475-3163-3
