= Ricky Fenson =

British rock bass guitarist (born 1945)

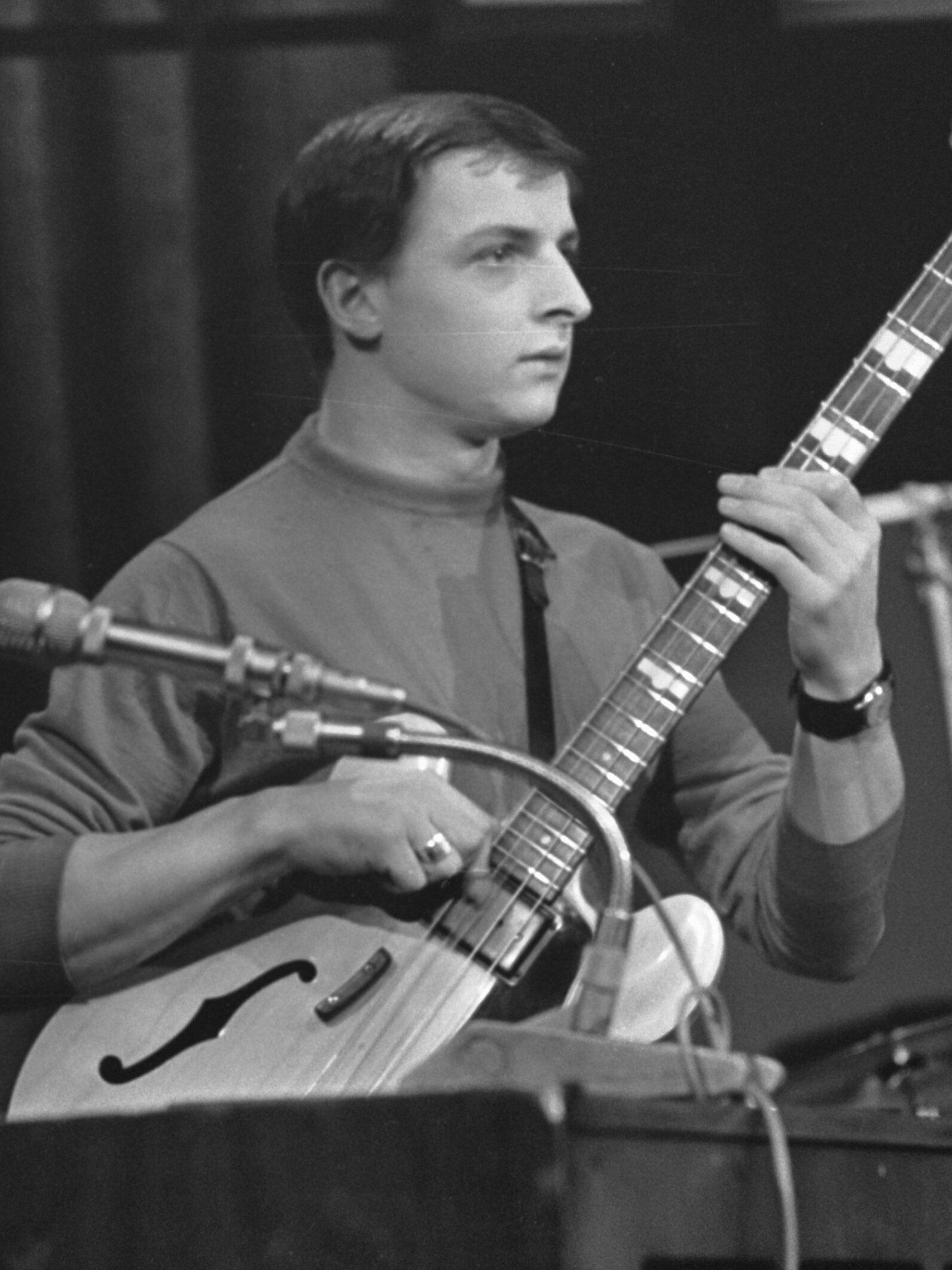
- Fenson with Georgie Fame in 1966

Background information
- Born: Richard Brown; 22 May 1945 (age 80); Chopwell, County Durham, England
- Genres: Rock; British blues
- Occupation: Bassist
- Instrument: Bass guitar

Richard Brown (born 22 May 1945), better known by his stage name of Ricky Fenson and also known as Rick Brown, is a British bass guitarist.

== The Rolling Stones ==
Fenson briefly played with an early version of the Rolling Stones before he was replaced by Bill Wyman in their long-standing classic line-up. He appeared with the band in 1962 and 1963 with fellow Screaming Lord Sutch and the Savages and Cyril Davies' All Stars band members Carlo Little and Nicky Hopkins, including a gig at Sidcup Art College, Bexley, which Keith Richards attended.

== Later career ==
Fenson was also a member of the bands Brian Auger and the Trinity and Steampacket. He also appeared with Screaming Lord Sutch and the Savages and Cyril Davies' All Stars.

He would later play double bass for the London Festival Ballet and then for the Scottish Ballet and Opera.
