= Alexis Korner's Blues Incorporated =

English blues band (1961–1966)

- Also known as: Blues Incorporated
- Origin: London, England
- Genres: Blues; rhythm and blues
- Years active: 1961–1966
- Labels: Decca; Parlophone; Fontana; Transatlantic
- Past members: Alexis Korner; Cyril Davies; Long John Baldry; Jack Bruce; Dick Heckstall-Smith; Art Wood; Ginger Baker; Graham Bond; Herbie Goins; Danny Thompson; Duffy Power; Johnny Parker; Charlie Watts

Alexis Korner's Blues Incorporated, or simply Blues Incorporated, were an English blues band formed in London in 1961, led by Alexis Korner and including at various times Jack Bruce, Charlie Watts, Terry Cox, Ginger Baker, Art Wood, Long John Baldry, Ronnie Jones, Danny Thompson, Graham Bond, Cyril Davies, and Dick Heckstall-Smith.

== History ==
Korner (1928–1984) was a member of Chris Barber's Jazz Band in the 1950s, and met up with Cyril Davies (1932–1964) who shared his passion for American Blues. In 1954 they teamed up as a duo, began playing blues in London jazz clubs, and opened their own club, the London Blues and Barrelhouse Club, where they featured visiting bluesmen from America. The club embraced aspiring young musicians, including in its early days Charlie Watts, Long John Baldry, and Jack Bruce.

In 1961 Korner and Davies formed Blues Incorporated, the first amplified R&B band in Britain, and brought in singer Baldry (sometimes replaced by Art Wood), drummer Watts, bassist Bruce, and saxophonist Dick Heckstall-Smith. It was an informal band: its membership was intended to be fluid.

On 17 March 1962, Korner and Davies established a regular "Rhythm and Blues Night" at the Ealing Jazz Club. This brought together many more fans of blues and R&B music including Mick Jagger, Keith Richards, Brian Jones, Eric Clapton, Rod Stewart, Paul Jones, John Mayall, Zoot Money, and Jimmy Page, some of whom would occasionally sit in at Blues Incorporated performances. Watts left the group around this time to join the Rolling Stones and suggested Ginger Baker as his replacement.

From 3 May 1962, Blues Incorporated secured a Thursday-night residency at the Marquee Club, which brought them to the attention of record producer and promoter Jack Good who arranged a recording contract with Decca Records resulting in the LP R&B from the Marquee, released in late 1962. The album was actually recorded in the Decca studio and featured Baldry as lead singer with songs by Muddy Waters, Jimmy Witherspoon and Leroy Carr.

Late in 1962 Davies disagreed with Korner's intention to add a brass section to the band and turn more towards jazz than blues, so left to form his own group, the Cyril Davies All-Stars, and was replaced by Graham Bond. Blues Incorporated found a new residency at the Flamingo club but, shortly afterwards, Bond, Bruce and Baker left to form the Graham Bond Organisation.

Blues Incorporated concentrated on live work rather than recording and the group only released two singles on Parlophone, "I Need Your Loving" / "Please Please Please Please" (1964) and "Little Baby" / "Roberta" (1965). In 1964 they released the LPs At The Cavern and Red Hot From Alex, with American Herbie Goins as lead singer and Danny Thompson, later of Pentangle, on bass. By the time of the group's last album Sky High (credited to Alexis Korner's Blues Incorporated) in 1965, the group included Duffy Power on vocals. Korner dissolved the group in 1966.

== Discography ==
- R&B from the Marquee (1962)
- Red Hot From Alex (1964)
- At The Cavern (1964)
- Alexis Korner's Blues Incorporated (1965)
- Sky High (1965)

== Bibliography ==
- Bob Brunning (1986) Blues: The British Connection, London: Helter Skelter, 2002, ISBN 1-900924-41-2
- Bob Brunning, The Fleetwood Mac Story: Rumours and Lies (Omnibus Press, 2004, foreword by B. B. King
- Dick Heckstall-Smith (2004) The safest place in the world: A personal history of British Rhythm and blues, Clear Books, ISBN 0-7043-2696-5 – First Edition : Blowing The Blues – Fifty Years Playing The British Blues
- Christopher Hjort Strange brew: Eric Clapton and the British blues boom, 1965-1970, foreword by John Mayall, Jawbone (2007)ISBN 1-906002002
- Harry Shapiro Alexis Korner: The Biography, Bloomsbury Publishing PLC, London 1997, Discography by Mark Troster
