= London Blues and Barrelhouse Club =

Coordinates: 51.51251°N 0.13335°W

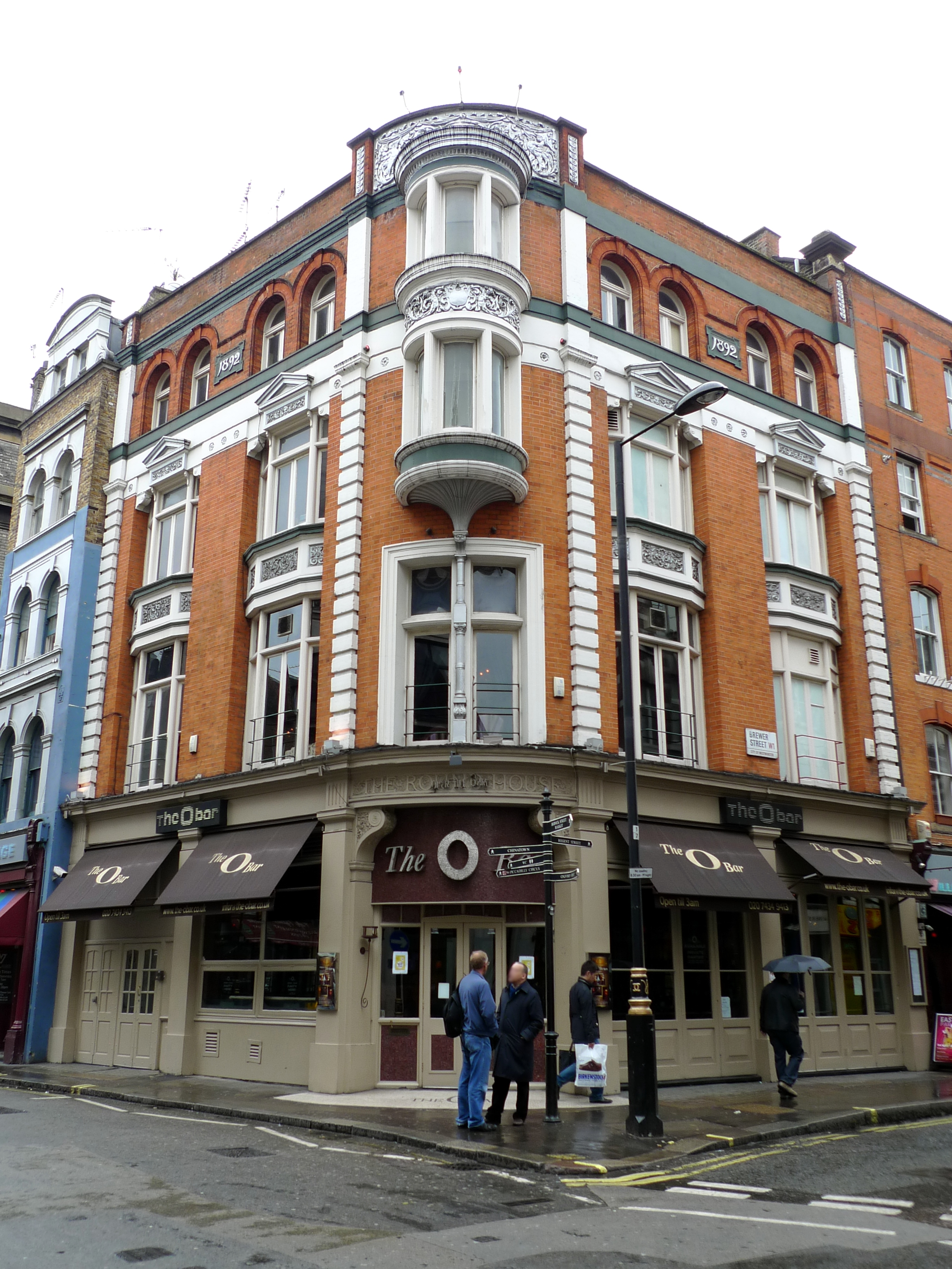
The club's venue, now the "O Bar", in 2010

The London Blues and Barrelhouse Club ran between 1957 and 1961 at the Round House public house at the junction of Wardour Street and Brewer Street in Soho, London. Established by Cyril Davies and Alexis Korner, it hosted many visiting American blues performers and was an important catalyst in developing British blues music, R&B, and ultimately British rock music.

== History ==
In September 1955, musicians Cyril Davies and Bob Watson set up the London Skiffle Club, meeting weekly on Thursday evenings in an upstairs room of the Round House pub. The venue was originally the Blue Cross inn, renamed the Round House in 1862 and rebuilt in 1892. (It was unconnected with the Roundhouse venue at Chalk Farm some 2.5 miles (4.0 km) away.) Though early meetings were occasionally billed as the Blues and Skiffle Club, the craze for skiffle music meant that the club became popular but that little traditional blues music was performed there.

After Watson ended his involvement in early 1957 to join Dickie Bishop's Sidekicks, Davies, who was "tired of all this skiffle stuff", closed down the club and, with Alexis Korner, reopened it a few weeks later as the London Blues and Barrelhouse Club. Though it lost its earlier clientele of skiffle fans, the club attracted a new audience, listening to Korner and Davies with accompanying musicians. In November 1957, an LP, Blues from the Roundhouse, was given a limited release of 99 copies on Doug Dobell's 77 label, credited to Alex Korner's Breakdown Group Featuring Cyril Davis [sic]; four of the tracks were written by Lead Belly. A few months later, in early 1958, an EP, Blues from the Roundhouse Vol.1, credited to the Alexis Korner Skiffle Group, was released by Tempo Records. Regular performers alongside Korner and Davies included guitarist Geoff Bradford, and visitors included Long John Baldry, Davy Graham and Ralph McTell.

Jazz band leader Chris Barber had established connections with American blues musicians and organised tours for them in Britain, with performances at the Blues and Barrelhouse Club. In 1957 and 1958, visiting performers included Big Bill Broonzy, Brother John Sellers, Sister Rosetta Tharpe, and Sonny Terry & Brownie McGhee. Other guest performers included Memphis Slim, Little Brother Montgomery, Champion Jack Dupree, Speckled Red, Otis Spann, and Ramblin' Jack Elliott. The BBC reported live from the club for the TV programme Town and Country in 1960.

In October 1958, Muddy Waters performed at the venue, the first time a performer using an electric guitar had appeared there. In response, Korner and Davies began playing amplified rather than acoustic music, and the club's existence at the Round House soon ended. Korner and Davies formed the band Blues Incorporated, and in 1961 moved their residency to the Ealing Jazz Club, where they were seen and soon joined onstage by musicians including future members of the Rolling Stones, who formed their own group as a result.

Folk music nights continued at the Round House for some years, organised by Bob Davenport. The Round House venue is now known as the O Bar.
