= Art Wood =

- Born: Arthur Wood; 7 July 1937; West Drayton, Middlesex, United Kingdom
- Died: 3 November 2006 (aged 69) London, United Kingdom
- Genres: Blues, pop, rock
- Occupation: Singer

Arthur Wood (7 July 1937 – 3 November 2006) was a British blues, pop and rock singer, who led The Artwoods in the 1960s and subsequently became a graphic artist. He was the brother of Ronnie Wood of the Rolling Stones.

== Early life ==
Born in 1937, Wood grew up in the village of Yiewsley, Middlesex. Wood came from a family of canal Bargees of England. He was the oldest son of Arthur "Archie" Wood and Lizzie Dyer Wood, his two younger brothers were musicians Ted and Ron Wood. In 1950 he enrolled at the Ealing School of Art where he developed his musical interests, as well as taking a keen interest in graphic design and fine art.

== Career ==
In 1955 he started two years of National Service; he was posted to Devizes, Wiltshire, where he formed a skiffle group. In 1958, after he had returned to London, he formed his own R&B group, the Art Wood Combo, playing versions of songs by Chuck Berry, Fats Domino and others. By 1962, he was one of several singers regularly featured with Alexis Korner's Blues Incorporated, which also included Charlie Watts and Cyril Davies. However, as that group firmed up its line-up with Long John Baldry as the main lead singer, Wood formed his own group, which he now called The Artwoods. The group included organist Jon Lord (who would go on to form Deep Purple) and drummer Keef Hartley.

The Artwoods failed to make a major commercial breakthrough, and split up in 1967. In 1969 Wood formed the short-lived group Quiet Melon, with his brother Ronnie, Rod Stewart, Ronnie Lane, Kenney Jones, Ian McLagan and Kim Gardner. They recorded four songs and delivered the tapes to Fontana Records, who turned them down and cancelled Wood's contract. He then semi-retired from the music business; Gardner later went on to form Ashton, Gardner & Dyke; and the other members of the group carried on to become The Faces.

Wood joined his brother Ted in setting up a graphic design business and continued to perform on a semi-professional basis with the Downliners Sect, the Carlo Little All-Stars, and reunited versions of the Artwoods, with occasional guest appearances by his brother Ronnie.

== Personal life ==
Wood had one child, a son named Simon from his first marriage to Doreen G Harris in 1960 from whom he had two grandsons. Upon his death he was married to his second wife Angela.

Wood died in London from prostate cancer on 3 November 2006, aged 69. He is buried in Teddington Cemetery, Shacklegate Lane, Teddington, Middlesex.
