= R&B from the Marquee =

Studio album by Alexis Korner's Blues Incorporated
- Released: November 1962
- Recorded: 8 June 1962
- Studio: West Hampstead Studios, London
- Genre: British rhythm and blues, blues rock
- Length: 34:31
- Label: Decca
- Producer: Jack Good

Alexis Korner's Blues Incorporated chronology
R&B from the Marquee (1962)	Red Hot From Alex (1964)

Professional ratings
Review scores
Source	Rating
AllMusic	5/5 stars
The Penguin Guide to Blues Recordings	3.5/4 stars

R&B from the Marquee is an album by Alexis Korner's Blues Incorporated released in November 1962 on Decca Records. Blues Incorporated was a British rhythm and blues band in the early 1960s. Although never very successful commercially, it was extremely influential on the development of British rock music in the 1960s and later.

== Track listing ==
Side A
No.	Title	Writer(s)	Featured vocalist	Length
1.	"Gotta Move"	Alexis Korner		2:28
2.	"Rain is Such a Lonesome Sound"	Jimmy Witherspoon, Rachel Witherspoon	Long John Baldry	2:49
3.	"I Got My Brand on You"	Willie Dixon	Cyril Davies	3:46
4.	"Spooky But Nice"	Davies		2:57
5.	"Keep Your Hands Off"	Davies	Davies	2:28
6.	"I Wanna Put a Tiger in Your Tank"	Dixon	Davies	2:52
Total length:				17:20

Side B
No.	Title	Writer(s)	Featured vocalist	Length
7.	"I Got My Mojo Working"	Preston Foster	Davies	3:09
8.	"Finkle's Cafe"	Korner		2:44
9.	"Hoochie Coochie"	Dixon	Davies	3:02
10.	"Down Town"	Korner		2:58
11.	"How Long, How Long Blues"	Leroy Carr	Baldry	3:00
12.	"I Thought I Heard That Train Whistle Blow"	Baldry	Baldry	2:18
Total length:				17:11

=== Re-releases ===
- The album was re-released by Decca on CD (UDCD 657) with a bonus track "I'm Built For Comfort" (Willie Dixon) Vocal: John Baldry.
- Limited re-issued CD in Japan in 2007 (24 January 2007) Strange Days Records (POCE-1087)

== Personnel ==
- Alexis Korner – guitar
- Cyril Davies – vocals (3,5,6,7,9), harmonica (except for 6)
- Dick Heckstall-Smith – tenor saxophone (except for 3), vocal chorus (7)
- Keith Scott – piano
- Spike Heatley – string bass (except for 7)
- Graham Burbidge – drums
- Long John Baldry – vocals (2,11,12), vocal chorus (7)
- Teddy Wadmore – bass guitar (7)
- Big Jim Sullivan – vocal chorus (7)
- Recording Engineer: Jack Clegg
- Produced by Jack Good
- Recorded: Decca West Hampstead Studios, London, 8 June 1962
- Released in November 1962 (Decca Ace of Clubs LP, ACL 1130)
