= Chanter Sisters =

British singing duo

The Chanter Sisters are British sisters Irene and Doreen Chanter who perform both as a duo, and as backing for other singers. They released three albums and a number of singles from the mid to late 1970s.

== Background ==
Irene and Doreen began recording as The Chanters – a family group which also included several of their brothers.

The sisters then went their own way, recording first under the name Birds of a Feather, and later as The Chanter Sisters, enjoying their only UK Singles Chart hit when "Sideshow" (Note: Not to be confused with the much bigger hit for Barry Biggs with the same title later the same year.) entered the chart in July 1976 reaching number 43.

The sisters have been far more successful in their backup singing career. Their credits include work with Elton John, Long John Baldry, Phil Manzanera, Roxy Music, John Miles, The Secret Policeman's Ball, Van Morrison, Pink Floyd, Roger Waters, Meat Loaf, Joe Cocker and many other famous names. The pair also had uncredited bit parts as schoolgirls in the 1971 horror film, Twins of Evil.

Although the sisters have predominantly worked together, Doreen has had the more extensive musical career, touring without her sister with several of the above named bands. However, the pair continue to work together in the recording studio, providing backup vocals for Chris Farlowe as recently as 2003.

Doreen also found success as a songwriter, being responsible for "Star", a UK hit in 1982 for Kiki Dee.

== Songs recorded ==
One of the songs they covered was "If Only I Could Start Again". This song released as a single in 1977 had previously been covered by The Drifters and was from their 1975 album There Goes My First Love. It was written by Geoff Stephens and Roger Greenaway.

== Recordings ==
=== UK 7" singles ===
- "Sideshow" / "Goodbye Charlie" – Polydor 2058 735 – 1976
- "Band of Gold" / "Blue Jean days" – Polydor 2058 699 – 1976
- "Halfway To Paradise" / "My love" – Polydor 2058 679 – 1976
- "Just Your Fool" / "History" – Polydor 2058 795 – 1976
- "Na Na Hey Hey (Kiss Him Goodbye)" / "When The Lights Go Out" – Safari SAFE 3 – 1978
- "Can't Stop Dancing" / "Back on the Road" – Safari SAFE 10 – 1978

=== US singles ===
- "Blue Jean Days" / "Cuckoo Cuckoo" – Polydor PD 14327 – 1975

=== Euro singles ===
- "Sideshow" /" Goodbye Charlie" – Polydor 2058 740 – 1976 – (picture sleeve) – (Italy)
- "Cuckoo Cuckoo" / "Sweet Water Memory" – Polydor 2058 608 – 1976 – (Germany) – (art sleeve)
- "Just Your Fool" /" History" – Safari 612073 – 1976 (picture sleeve) (Australia)
- "Just Your Fool" / "Talking Too Much About My Baby" – Safari 612073 – 1976 (company sleeve) – (Germany)
- "Just Your Fool" / "Nashville" Polydor 2058 816 – 1976 (picture sleeve) – Italy
- "Dance Dance Dance" / "It's Too Late Now" – Safari 6.12169 AC – 1977 – (picture sleeve) – (Germany)
- "Can't Stop Dancing" / "Back on the Road" – 1978 – Germany, Italy

=== Unknown ===
- "Sideshow" / "Turn Rolling Stone"

=== 12" singles ===
- "Na Na Hey Hey", "Danny Disco" / "When the Lights Go Out" – Safari DOZ1 – 1977 (UK)
- "Can't Stop Dancing" / "Back on the Road" – Safari / Crystal 052 CRY 61816 YZ – 1979 – (Blue vinyl) – (Germany)

=== UK 12" albums ===
- First Flight – Polydor 2383 382 – 1976

Side A: "Cuckoo-Cuckoo", "Darlin'", "Side Show", "Hound Dog", "Band of Gold" / "(Your Love Has Lifted Me) Higher And Higher"
Side B: "Halfway To Paradise", "Turn Rolling Stone", "Blue Jean Days", "All The Young Dudes", "Loving You Is"

- Ready for Love – Safari LONG 3 – 1977

Side A: "You've Lost that Lovin' Feelin'", "Never Thought Falling in Love (Could Be So Wild)", "Dance Dance Dance", "Talking Too Much About My Baby", "When the Lights Go Out"
Side B: "Na Na Hey Hey (Kiss Him Ggoodbye)" / "It's Too Late Now"/ "Sunshine Day" / "Nashville"

- Shoulder to Shoulder – Safari LONG 4 – 1978

Side A: "Shoulder to Shoulder", "Oh What A Shame", "I Wanna Get Closer", "I Love You", "Born to Lose"
Side B: "Can't Stop Dancing", "Cari Blue", "I'll Be There", "I've Got Your Number", "Thanks To You"
