= Cyril Davies =

English blues musician (1932–1964)

- Born: 23 January 1932; Denham, Buckinghamshire, England
- Died: 7 January 1964 (aged 31) London, England
- Genres: British blues; Chicago blues; rhythm and blues
- Occupation: Musician
- Instruments: Harmonica; vocals
- Years active: Early 1950s–1964
- Formerly of: Cyril Davies All-Stars; Blues Incorporated

Cyril Davies (23 January 1932 – 7 January 1964) was an English blues musician, and one of the first blues harmonica players in England.

== Early life ==
Born at St Mildred's, 15 Hawthorn Drive, Willowbank, Denham, Buckinghamshire, he was the son of William Albert Davies, a labourer, and his wife Margaret Mary (née Jones). He had an elder brother named Glyn, and the family is believed to have come from Wales.

== Career ==
=== 1950s ===
Cyril Davies began his career in the early 1950s first within Steve Lane's Southern Stompers, then in 1955 formed an acoustic skiffle and blues group with Alexis Korner. He began as a banjo and 12-string guitar player before becoming a Chicago-style blues harmonica player after hearing Little Walter. Working by day as a panel beater, he ran an unsuccessful skiffle club before meeting Korner, then Davies and Korner opened a London Rhythm and Blues club "England's Firstest and Bestest Skiffle Club", later known as the "London Blues and Barrelhouse Club". Popular with other musicians, the club hosted gigs by blues musicians such as Muddy Waters, Sonny Terry and Brownie McGhee and Memphis Slim.

During this period Davies and Korner worked as session musicians, and often backed Ottilie Patterson during her featured set with husband Chris Barber's band, using amplified instruments for the first time – which did not go down well with their blues purist audience and many fellow musicians. After closing the blues club, Davies and Korner went their separate ways, and, influenced by Muddy Waters electric sound, Davies formed his own electric blues band.

=== The Ealing Club and Blues Incorporated ===
In 1961, Chris Barber recruited Davies and Korner to play harmonica and electric guitar in accompanying Barber's band regularly at its Wednesday and Friday night sets at the Marquee Club, a popular London jazz club. This opportunity granted Davies and Korner some exposure to the London music scene, but the duo wished to focus more on blues and R&B. The two decided to found their own rhythm and blues group and, in a show of support, Barber offered them the intermission slot at the Marquee on Wednesday nights.

Korner supplied musicians for the rhythm sections, and Davies recruited Art Wood and Long John Baldry to be the vocalists. They named the group Blues Incorporated, and their initial performances at the Marquee were very well received. However, they realized the need for additional performance opportunities and, since most jazz and folk clubs in London were wary of electric guitars, Davies and Korner decided to found their own club at which they could perform. In 1962 they founded the Ealing Club, which featured performances by both Blues Incorporated and other Trad jazz outfits popular in England at the time. The club proved to be a popular sensation in the burgeoning R&B scene, and attracted such far-flung admirers and future stars as Mick Jagger and Eric Burdon. Jagger was in the audience for the second night at the club and got up to sing "Got My Mojo Working".

=== Later success ===
In June 1962 they recorded R&B from the Marquee, actually recorded in Decca Records' studio. After touring the UK and headlining a residency at the Marquee, by October 1962 there was musical tension in the band as some members wanted to play crowd pleasers like Chuck Berry and Bo Diddley songs while Cyril Davies and others members were blues purists who wanted to play what they saw as only genuine Chicago-style R&B. Following his departure from Blues Incorporated in October 1962, Davies then formed the Cyril Davies All-Stars in November 1962 and recorded five tracks for Pye Records, who had announced an R&B label featuring music imported from Davies' favourite Chicago musicians ("Country Line Special", "Chicago Calling", "Preachin' the Blues", "Sweet Mary" and "Someday Baby").

The original line-up was largely recruited from Screaming Lord Sutch's Savages, and featured both Long John Baldry and Davies on vocals to give Davies room to play harmonica. The band, later known simply as the All-Stars was subject to frequent personnel changes. In 1963, on one or probably multiple occasions he recorded or contributed to at least 17 tracks in front of a live television audience for the UK regional television folk and blues music series Hullabaloo presented by the Scottish folksinger Rory McEwen, mostly with his band billed as "His Rhythm and Blues All Stars", most also featuring as singer the young (22 year old) Long John Baldry (simply as "John Baldry") plus backing trio "The Velvettes"; these sessions were released on DVD in 2020.

In October 2014 the compilation entitled Preachin' The Blues: The Cyril Davies Memorial Album was finally released on GVC Records (GVC2040) in Great Britain.

== Personal life ==
Davies married his wife Marie in 1953. The couple had a son and a daughter. After his death Marie married his bandmate Brian Knight.

== Death ==
After contracting pleurisy in 1963, Davies began to drink heavily to assuage the pain while undergoing a heavy touring schedule. He died in January 1964, after collapsing during an engagement at a night club on Eel Pie Island, Twickenham in London. The official cause of death was given as endocarditis, although leukaemia is often quoted. The core band was taken over by Long John Baldry and formed the basis of his 'Hoochie Coochie Men'.

== See also ==
- List of blues musicians
- List of British blues musicians
- List of harmonicists
- British blues

== Bibliography ==
- Bob Brunning, Blues: The British Connection, London: Helter Skelter Publishing, 2002, ISBN 1-900924-41-2 – First edition 1986 – Second edition 1995 Blues in Britain
- Bob Brunning, The Fleetwood Mac Story: Rumours and Lies, London: Omnibus Press, 1990 and 1998, ISBN 0-7119-6907-8
- Martin Celmins, Peter Green – Founder of Fleetwood Mac, London: Sanctuary, 1995, foreword by B. B. King, ISBN 1-86074-233-5
- Fancourt, L. (1989), British blues on record (1957–1970), Retrack Books.
- Dick Heckstall-Smith, The safest place in the world: A personal history of British Rhythm and blues, London: Quartet Books Limited, 1989, ISBN 0-7043-2696-5 – Second Edition: Blowing The Blues – Fifty Years Playing The British Blues, 2004, Clear Books, ISBN 1-904555-04-7
- Christopher Hjort, Strange brew: Eric Clapton and the British blues boom, 1965–1970, foreword by John Mayall, Jawbone 2007, ISBN 1-906002-00-2
- Paul Myers, Long John Baldry and the Birth of the British Blues, Vancouver 2007, GreyStone Books, ISBN 1-55365-200-2
- Harry Shapiro Alexis Korner: The Biography, London: Bloomsbury Publishing PLC, 1997, Discography by Mark Troster, ISBN 0-7475-3163-3
- Schwartz, R. F. (2007), How Britain got the blues: The transmission and reception of American blues style in the United Kingdom, Ashgate, ISBN 0-7546-5580-6.
- Mike Vernon, The Blue Horizon story 1965–1970 vol.1, notes of the booklet of the Box Set (60 pages)
