= Gail Davies discography =

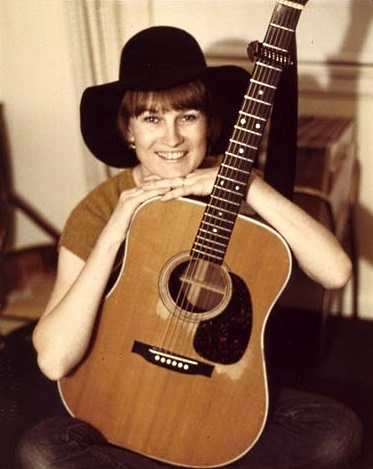
- Gail Davies with her D-28 Martin guitar.
- Studio albums: 13
- Live albums: 1
- Compilation albums: 1
- Singles: 25

The discography of American country artist Gail Davies consists of thirteen studio albums, one compilation, one live album, and twenty-five singles. In 1974, she recorded and released one single with A&M Records before signing with Lifesong Records in 1978. Her self-titled debut album was released in November 1978, spawning three singles. The album's first single, a cover Webb Pierce's "No Love Have I", peaked at number twenty six on the Billboard Hot Country Singles chart. It was the third single entitled "Someone Is Looking for Someone Like You" that became Davies' first major hit, reaching the top fifteen on the Billboard country chart in 1979. Dissatisfied with her first album's production techniques, Davies produced her second studio album, The Game. With the album's released in 1980, Davies became the first female country artist to produce her own recordings entirely by herself. "Blue Heartache" was the project's lead single, becoming her first top-ten hit in 1980.

I'll Be There (1981) was her third studio album and became the most commercially successful, peaking at number twenty-seven on the Billboard Top Country Albums chart. Spawning three singles, "I'll Be There (If You Ever Want Me)", "It's a Lovely, Lovely World", and "Grandma's Song", became top-ten hits on the Hot Country Singles chart. Her next studio album Givin' Herself Away was issued in February 1982. It included the top-ten single, "Round the Clock Lovin'" and a cover of Marty Robbins' "Singing the Blues", which reached the country top twenty. What Can I Say (1983) was her fifth studio release and final recording for Warner Bros. Records, reaching number forty-eight on the country albums chart in 1983. Signing with RCA Nashville in 1984, Where Is a Woman to Go was released on the label that November, reaching a peak of number fifty-seven. The album spawned a total of four singles, including the major hits "Jagged Edge of a Broken Heart" and "Break Away". Pretty Words was issued in 1989 on MCA Records, spawning two minor Billboard country singles. While becoming a staff producer for Capitol Nashville in 1990, Davies released her next studio album, The Other Side of Love, through the same label. In the 1990s, she formed her own record label entitled Little Chickadee, releasing three studio albums on the company: Eclectic (1995) and Greatest Hits and Love Ain't Easy (1998). Her 2005 studio album release The Songwriter Sessions compiled forty-five original tracks recorded by Davies throughout her career.

== Albums ==
=== Studio albums ===
List of albums, with selected chart positions, showing other relevant details
Title	Album details	Peak chart positions
Title	Album details	US Country
Gail Davies	Released: November 1978; Label: Lifesong; Formats: LP, cassette	—
The Game	Released: January 1980; Label: Warner Bros.; Formats: LP, cassette	40
I'll Be There	Released: January 1981; Label: Warner Bros.; Formats: LP, cassette	27
Givin' Herself Away	Released: February 1982; Label: Warner Bros.; Formats: LP, cassette	41
What Can I Say	Released: November 1983; Label: Warner Bros.; Formats: LP, cassette	48
Where Is a Woman to Go	Released: November 1984; Label: RCA Nashville; Formats: LP, cassette	57
Pretty Words	Released: March 1989; Label: MCA; Formats: LP, CD, cassette	—
The Other Side of Love	Released: May 10, 1990; Label: Capitol Nashville; Formats: Cassette, CD	—
Eclectic	Released: July 18, 1995; Label: Little Chickadee; Formats: CD	—
Greatest Hits	Release date: June 16, 1998; Label: Little Chickadee; Formats: CD	—
Love Ain't Easy	Released: 1998; Label: Little Chickadee; Formats: CD	—
The Songwriter Sessions	Release date: 2003; Label: Little Chickadee; Formats: CD	—
Since I Don't Have You (featuring Benny Golson)	Released: February 24, 2014; Label: Little Chickadee; Formats: CD	—
"—" denotes releases that did not chart

=== Live albums ===
List of live albums, showing other relevant details
Title	Album details
Live and Unplugged at the Station Inn	Release date: September 25, 2001; Label: Little Chickadee; Formats: CD

=== Compilation albums ===
List of compilation albums, showing all relevant details
Title	Album details
The Best of Gail Davies	Release date: February 1, 1991; Label: Liberty; Formats: Cassette, CD

== Singles ==
List of singles, with selected chart positions, showing other relevant details
Title	Year	Peak chart positions		Album
Title	Year	US Cou.	CAN Cou.	Album
"Party in My Heart"	1974	—	—	Non-album single
"No Love Have I"	1978	26	—	Gail Davies
"Poison Love"	1978	27	—	Gail Davies
"Someone Is Looking for Someone Like You"	1979	11	—	Gail Davies
"Blue Heartache"	1979	7	49	The Game
"Like Strangers"	1980	21	52	The Game
"Good Lovin' Man"	1980	21	—	The Game
"I'll Be There (If You Ever Want Me)"	1980	4	8	I'll Be There
"It's a Lovely, Lovely World"	1981	5	11	I'll Be There
"Grandma's Song"	1981	9	17	I'll Be There
"Round the Clock Lovin'"	1982	9	13	Givin' Herself Away
"You Turn Me On, I'm a Radio"	1982	17	7	Givin' Herself Away
"Hold On"	1982	24	—	Givin' Herself Away
"Singing the Blues"	1983	17	19	Givin' Herself Away
"You're a Hard Dog (To Keep Under the Porch)"	1983	18	20	What Can I Say
"Boys like You"	1984	19	26	What Can I Say
"It's You Alone"	1984	55	—	What Can I Say
"Jagged Edge of a Broken Heart"	1984	20	38	Where Is a Woman to Go
"Nothing Can Hurt Me Now"	1985	37	50	Where Is a Woman to Go
"Unwed Fathers"	1985	56	—	Where Is a Woman to Go
"Break Away"	1985	15	—	Where Is a Woman to Go
"Waiting Here for You"	1989	50	—	Pretty Words
"Hearts in the Wind"	1989	69	—	Pretty Words
"Happy Ever After (Comes One Day at a Time)"	1990	—	—	The Other Side of Love
"The Other Side of Love"	1990	—	89	The Other Side of Love
"Your Mamma Works So Hard"	1995	—	—	Eclectic
"—" denotes releases that did not chart

== Appearances on other artist's albums ==
Year	Artist	Album
1974	Michael Dinner	The Great Pretender
1975	Hoyt Axton	Southbound
1976	Tom Pachero	Swallowed Up
1977	Hoyt Axton	Road Songs
1982	Lacy J. Dalton	Dream Baby
1985	Neil Young	Old Ways
1985	Emmylou Harris	The Ballad of Sally Rose
1987	The Whites	Greatest Hits
1996	Hugh Moffat	The Life of a Minor Poet
1996	Emmylou Harris	Portraits
1998	Paul Craft	Brother Jukebox
2001	Rosie Flores	Speed of Sound
2002	Ralph Stanley	Clinch Mountain Sweethearts
2003	Ron Davies	Where Does the Time Go

== Music videos ==
Year	Title
1985	"Jagged Edge of a Broken Heart"
1985	"The Trouble with Love"
1985	"Break Away"
