= Audio engineer =

Engineer involved in the recording, reproduction, or reinforcement of sound

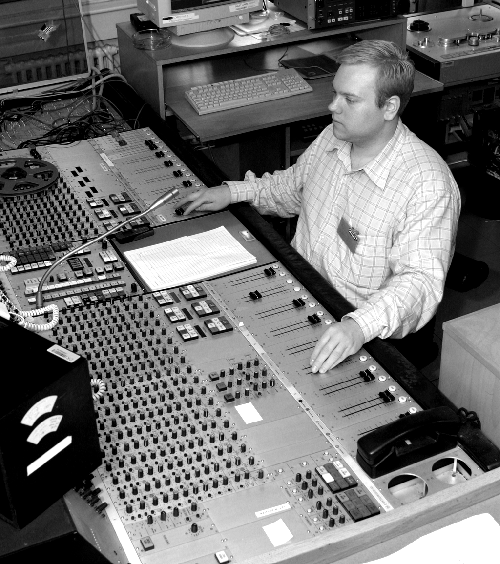
An audio engineer with audio console at a recording session at the Danish Broadcasting Corporation

An audio engineer (also known as a sound engineer or recording engineer) helps to produce a recording or a live performance, balancing and adjusting sound sources using equalization, dynamics processing and audio effects, mixing, reproduction, and reinforcement of sound. Audio engineers work on the "technical aspect of recording—the placing of microphones, pre-amp knobs, the setting of levels. The physical recording of any project is done by an engineer…"

Sound engineering is increasingly viewed as a creative profession and art form, where musical instruments and technology are used to produce sound for film, radio, television, music and video games. Audio engineers also set up, sound check, and do live sound mixing using a mixing console and a sound reinforcement system for music concerts, theatre, sports games, and corporate events.

Alternatively, audio engineer can refer to a scientist or engineer who holds a degree and designs, develops, and builds audio or musical technology working under terms such as electronic/electrical engineering or (musical) signal processing.

== Research and development ==
Research and development audio engineers invent new technologies, audio software, equipment, and techniques to enhance the process and art of audio engineering. They might design acoustical simulations of rooms, shape algorithms for audio signal processing, specify the requirements for public address systems, carry out research on audible sound for video game console manufacturers, and other advanced fields of audio engineering. They might also be referred to as acoustic engineers.

=== Education ===
Audio engineers working in research and development may come from backgrounds such as acoustics, computer science, broadcast engineering, physics, acoustical engineering, electrical engineering, and electronics. Audio engineering courses at university or college fall into two rough categories: (i) training in the creative use of audio as a sound engineer, and (ii) training in science or engineering topics, which then allows students to apply these concepts while pursuing a career developing audio technologies. Audio training courses provide knowledge of technologies and their application to recording studios and sound reinforcement systems, but do not have sufficient mathematical and scientific content to allow someone to obtain employment in research and development in the audio and acoustic industry.

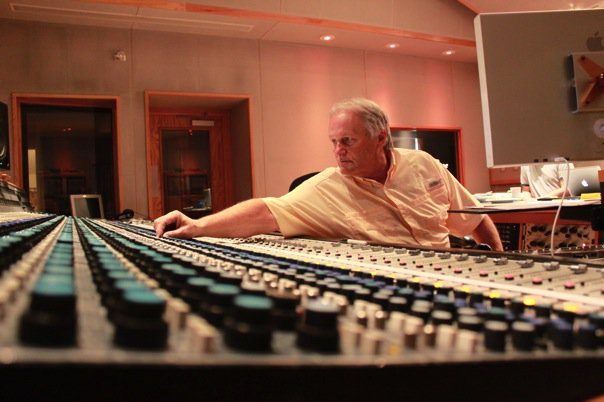
8-time Grammy-winning audio engineer Roger Nichols using a vintage Neve recording console

Audio engineers in research and development usually possess a bachelor's degree, master's degree or higher qualification in acoustics, physics, computer science or another engineering discipline. They might work in acoustic consultancy, specializing in architectural acoustics. Alternatively, they might work in audio companies (e.g., headphone manufacturers), or other industries that need audio expertise (e.g., automobile manufacturers), or carry out research in a university. Some positions, such as faculty (academic staff), require a Doctor of Philosophy. In Germany a Toningenieur is an audio engineer who designs, builds and repairs audio systems.

=== Sub-disciplines ===
The listed subdisciplines are based on PACS (Physics and Astronomy Classification Scheme) coding used by the Acoustical Society of America with some revision.

==== Audio signal processing ====
Audio engineers develop audio signal processing algorithms to allow the electronic manipulation of audio signals. These can be processed at the heart of much audio production, such as reverberation, Auto-Tune or perceptual coding (e.g., MP3 or Opus). Alternatively, the algorithms might perform echo cancellation, or identify and categorize audio content through music information retrieval or acoustic fingerprint.

==== Architectural acoustics ====
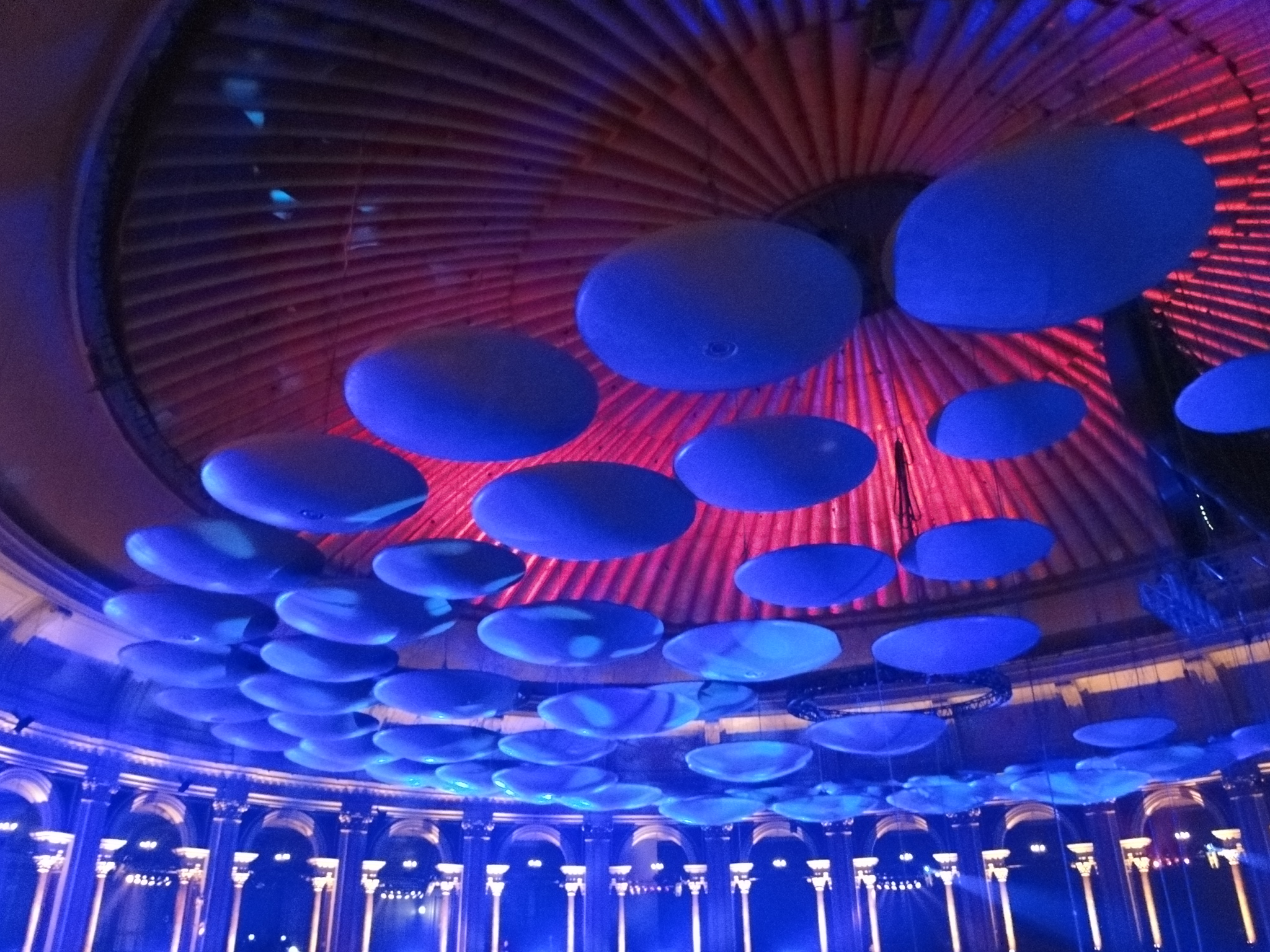
Acoustic diffusing mushrooms hanging from the roof of the Royal Albert Hall

Architectural acoustics is the science and engineering of achieving good sound within a room. For audio engineers, architectural acoustics can be about achieving good speech intelligibility in a stadium or enhancing the quality of music in a theatre. Architectural Acoustic design is usually done by acoustic consultants.

==== Electroacoustics ====
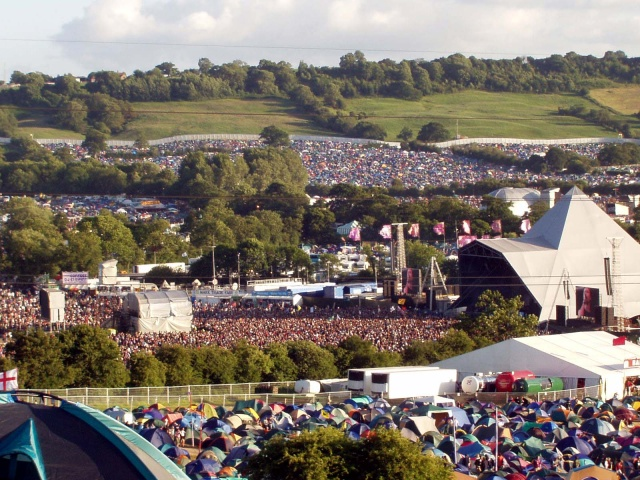
The Pyramid Stage

Electroacoustics is concerned with the design of headphones, microphones, loudspeakers, sound reproduction systems and recording technologies. Examples of electroacoustic design include portable electronic devices (e.g. mobile phones, portable media players, and tablet computers), sound systems in architectural acoustics, surround sound and wave field synthesis in movie theater and vehicle audio.

==== Musical acoustics ====
Musical acoustics is concerned with researching and describing the science of music. In audio engineering, this includes the design of electronic instruments such as synthesizers; the human voice (the physics and neurophysiology of singing); physical modeling of musical instruments; room acoustics of concert venues; music information retrieval; music therapy, and the perception and cognition of music.

==== Psychoacoustics ====
Psychoacoustics is the scientific study of how humans respond to what they hear. At the heart of audio engineering are listeners who are the final arbiters as to whether an audio design is successful, such as whether a binaural recording sounds immersive.

==== Speech ====
The production, computer processing and perception of speech is an important part of audio engineering. Ensuring speech is transmitted intelligibly, efficiently and with high quality; in rooms, through public address systems and through mobile telephone systems are important areas of study.

== Practitioner ==
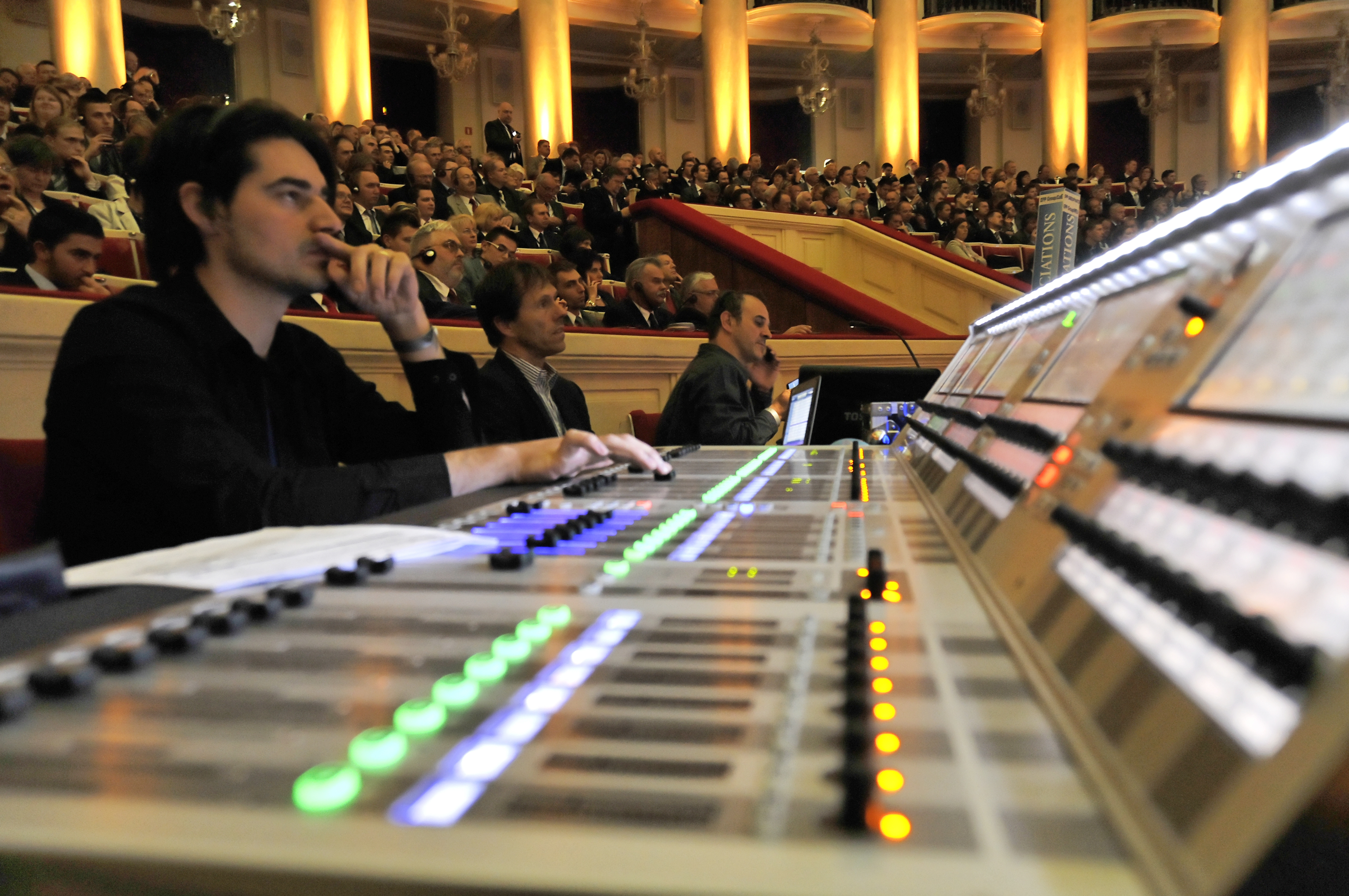
Live sound mixing

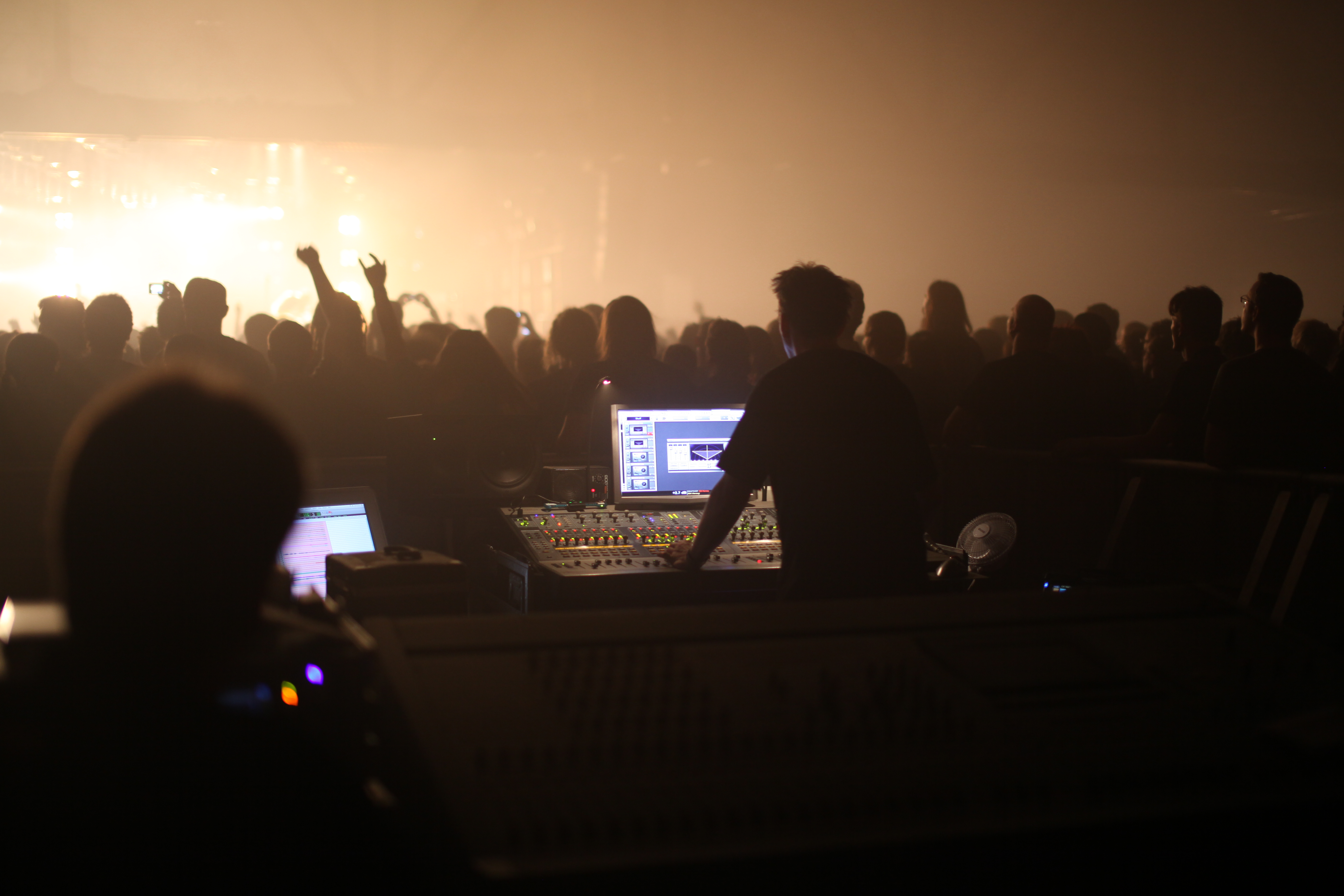
At the front of house position, mixing sound for a band

A variety of terms are used to describe audio engineers who install or operate sound recording, sound reinforcement, or sound broadcasting equipment, including large and small format consoles. Terms such as audio technician, sound technician, audio engineer, audio technologist, recording engineer, sound mixer, mixing engineer and sound engineer can be ambiguous; depending on the context, they may be synonymous, or they may refer to different roles in audio production. Such terms can refer to a person working in sound and music production; for instance, a sound engineer or recording engineer is commonly listed in the credits of commercial music recordings (as well as in other productions that include sound, such as movies). These titles can also refer to technicians who maintain professional audio equipment. Certain jurisdictions specifically prohibit the use of the title engineer to any individual not a registered member of a professional engineering licensing body.

In the recording studio environment, a sound engineer records, edits, manipulates, mixes, or masters sound by technical means to realize the creative vision of the artist and record producer. While usually associated with music production, an audio engineer deals with sound for a wide range of applications, including post-production for video and film, live sound reinforcement, advertising, multimedia, and broadcasting. In larger productions, an audio engineer is responsible for the technical aspects of a sound recording or other audio production, and works together with a record producer or director, although the engineer's role may also be integrated with that of the producer. In smaller productions and studios, the sound engineer and producer are often the same person.

In typical sound reinforcement applications, audio engineers often assume the role of producer, making artistic and technical decisions, and sometimes even scheduling and budget decisions.

=== Education and training ===
Audio engineers come from backgrounds or postsecondary training in fields such as audio, fine arts, broadcasting, music, or electrical engineering. Training in audio engineering and sound recording is offered by colleges and universities. Some audio engineers are autodidacts with no formal training, but who have attained professional skills in audio through extensive on-the-job experience.

Audio engineers must have extensive knowledge of audio engineering principles and techniques. For instance, they must understand how audio signals travel, which equipment to use and when, how to mic different instruments and amplifiers, which microphones to use and how to position them to get the best quality recordings. In addition to technical knowledge, an audio engineer must have the ability to problem-solve quickly. The best audio engineers also have a high degree of creativity that allows them to stand out amongst their peers. In the music realm, an audio engineer must also understand the types of sounds and tones that are expected in musical ensembles across different genres—rock and pop music, for example. This knowledge of musical style is typically learned from years of experience listening to and mixing music in recording or live sound contexts. For education and training, there are audio engineering schools all over the world.

=== Role of women ===
According to Women's Audio Mission (WAM), a nonprofit organization based in San Francisco dedicated to the advancement of women in music production and the recording arts, less than 5% of the people working in the field of sound and media are women. "Only three women have ever been nominated for best producer at the Brits or the Grammys" and none won either award. According to Susan Rogers, audio engineer and professor at Berklee College of Music, women interested in becoming an audio engineer face "a boys' club, or a guild mentality". The UK "Music Producers' Guild says less than 4% of its members are women" and at the Liverpool Institute of Performing Arts, "only 6% of the students enrolled on its sound technology course are female."

Women's Audio Mission was started in 2003 to address the lack of women in professional audio by training over 6,000 women and girls in the recording arts and is the only professional recording studio built and run by women. Notable recording projects include the Grammy Award-winning Kronos Quartet, Angelique Kidjo (2014 Grammy winner), author Salman Rushdie, the Academy Award-nominated soundtrack to "Dirty Wars", Van-Ahn Vo (NPR's top 50 albums of 2013), Grammy-nominated St. Lawrence Quartet, and world music artists Tanya Tagaq and Wu Man.

There certainly are efforts to chronicle women's roles and history in audio. Leslie Gaston-Bird wrote Women in Audio, which includes 100 profiles of women in audio through history. Sound Girls is an organization focused on the next generation of women in audio, but also has been building up resources and directories of women in audio. Women in Sound is another organization that has been working to highlight women and nonbinary people in all areas of live and recorded sound through an online zine and podcast featuring interviews of current audio engineers and producers.

One of the first women to produce, engineer, arrange and promote music on her own rock and roll music label was Cordell Jackson (1923–2004). Trina Shoemaker is a mixer, record producer and sound engineer who became the first woman to win the Grammy Award for Best Engineered Album in 1998 for her work on The Globe Sessions.

Gail Davies was the first female producer in country music, delivering a string of Top 10 hits in the 1970s and 1980s including "Someone Is Looking for Someone Like You", "Blue Heartache" and "I'll Be There (If You Ever Want Me)". When she moved to Nashville in 1976, men "didn't want to work for a woman" and she was told women in the city were "still barefoot, pregnant and [singing] in the vocal booth." When Jonell Polansky arrived in Nashville in 1994, with a degree in electrical engineering and recording experience in the Bay Area, she was told "You're a woman, and we already had one"—a reference to Wendy Waldman. KK Proffitt, a studio "owner and chief engineer", states that men in Nashville do not want to have women in the recording booth. At a meeting of the Audio Engineering Society, Proffitt was told to "shut up" by a male producer when she raised the issue of updating studio recording technologies. Proffitt said she "finds sexism rampant in the industry".

Other notable women include:

- Sylvia Robinson, early hip hop music producer
- Susan Rogers, engineer for Purple Rain
- Genya Ravan, producer The Dead Boys' Young, Loud and Snotty;
- Delia Derbyshire, British electronics pioneer
- Lari White, a co-producer on Toby Keith's White Trash With Money
- Leslie Ann Jones, recording engineer
- Sylvia Massy, engineer and producer for Tool, System of a Down, and Johnny Cash
- Ethel Gabriel, producer and record executive RCA Victor

=== Sub-disciplines ===
There are four distinct steps to the commercial production of a recording: recording, editing, mixing, and mastering. Typically, each is performed by a sound engineer who specializes only in that part of the production.

- Studio engineer – an engineer working within a studio facility, either with a producer or independently.
- Recording engineer – the engineer who records sound.
- Assistant engineer – often employed in larger studios, allowing them to train to become full-time engineers. They often assist full-time engineers with microphone setups, session breakdowns and in some cases, rough mixes.
- Mixing engineer – a person who creates mixes of multi-track recordings. It is common to record a commercial record at one studio and have it mixed by different engineers in other studios.
- Mastering engineer – the person who masters the final mixed stereo tracks (or sometimes a series of audio stems, which consist of a mix of the main sections) that the mix engineer produces. The mastering engineer makes any final adjustments to the overall sound of the record in the final step before commercial duplication. Mastering engineers use principles of equalization, compression and limiting to fine-tune the sound timbre and dynamics and to achieve a louder recording.
- Sound designer – broadly an artist who produces soundtracks or sound effects content for media.
- Live sound engineer
  - Front of House (FOH) engineer, or A1. – a person dealing with live sound reinforcement. This usually includes planning and installation of loudspeakers, cabling and equipment and mixing sound during the show. This may or may not include running the foldback sound. A live/sound reinforcement engineer hears source material and tries to correlate that sonic experience with system performance.
  - Wireless microphone engineer, or A2. This position is responsible for wireless microphones during a theatre production, a sports event or a corporate event.
  - Foldback or Monitor engineer – a person running foldback sound during a live event. The term foldback comes from the old practice of folding back audio signals from the front of house (FOH) mixing console to the stage so musicians can hear themselves while performing. Monitor engineers usually have a separate audio system from the FOH engineer and manipulate audio signals independently from what the audience hears so they can satisfy the requirements of each performer on stage. In-ear systems, digital and analog mixing consoles, and a variety of speaker enclosures are typically used by monitor engineers. In addition, most monitor engineers must be familiar with wireless or RF (radio-frequency) equipment and often must communicate personally with the artist(s) during each performance.
  - Systems engineer – responsible for the design and setup of modern PA systems, which are often very complex. A systems engineer is usually also referred to as a crew chief on tour and is responsible for the performance and day-to-day job requirements of the audio crew as a whole along with the FOH audio system. This is a sound-only position concerned with implementation, not to be confused with the interdisciplinary field of system engineering, which typically requires a college degree.
- Re-recording mixer – a person in post-production who mixes audio tracks for feature films or television programs.

== Equipment ==
An audio engineer is proficient with different types of recording media, such as analog tape, digital multi-track recorders and workstations, plug-ins and computer knowledge. With the advent of the digital age, it is increasingly important for the audio engineer to understand software and hardware integration, from synchronization to analog to digital transfers. In their daily work, audio engineers use many tools, including:

- Tape machines
- Analog-to-digital converters
- Digital-to-analog converters
- Digital audio workstations (DAWs)
- Audio plug-ins
- Dynamic range compressors
- Audio data compressors
- Equalization (audio)
- Music sequencers
- Signal processors
- Headphones
- Microphones
- Preamplifiers
- Mixing consoles
- Amplifiers
- Loudspeakers

== Notable audio engineers ==
=== Recording ===
List
- Steve Albini
- Larry Alexander
- Jim Anderson
- Dave Aron
- Sylvia Massy
- Michael J. Bishop
- Tony Bongiovi
- Bill Bottrell
- David Bottrill
- Helmut Burk
- Iain Burgess
- Chuck Britz
- Patrick Brown
- Terry Brown
- John Burns
- Ian Caple
- Dru Castro
- Fred Catero
- Roy Cicala
- Bob Clearmountain
- John Congleton
- Mike Crossey
- Terry Date
- Nick Davis
- Charles De Schutter
- Neil Dorfsman
- Jack Douglas
- Tom Dowd
- Mark "Flood" Ellis
- Geoff Emerick
- Jack Endino
- Shawn Everett
- Bob Ezrin
- James Farber
- David R. Ferguson
- Steve Fisk
- Dave Fridmann
- Humberto Gatica
- Rudy Van Gelder
- Nigel Godrich
- Doug Grean
- James Guthrie
- Mick Guzauski
- Roy Halee
- Wally Heider
- David Hentschel
- Bones Howe
- Andrew Jackson
- Andy Johns
- Glyn Johns
- Leslie Ann Jones
- Toshi Kasai
- Neil Kernon
- Jacquire King
- Eddie Kramer
- Greg Ladanyi
- Maxime Le Guil
- Scott Litt
- James Lock
- Chris Lord-Alge
- Tom Lord-Alge
- Malinda Lowe
- Reinhold Mack
- Mike Marciano
- George Martin
- Tony Maserati
- George Massenburg
- Mario J. McNulty
- Joe Meek
- Yuri Morozov
- Alan Moulder
- Jack Mullin
- Evgeny Murzin
- Roger Nichols
- Clif Norrell
- Alex Tumay
- Paul Northfield
- Gary Paczosa
- Hugh Padgham
- Robert Parker
- Alan Parsons
- Dave Pensado
- Lynn Peterzell
- Tony Platt
- Malcolm Pollack
- Resul Pookutty
- Bill Porter
- Bill Putnam
- Bob Rock
- Phil Ramone
- Emitt Rhodes
- Bruce Robb (producer)
- Susan Rogers
- Scott Salem
- Elliot Scheiner
- Bill "Bear" Scheniman
- Andrew Scheps
- Al Schmitt
- Tom Scholz
- Jim Scott
- Ken Scott
- Da-Hong Seetoo
- Eberhard Sengpiel
- Mike Shipley
- Norman Smith
- H. Sridhar
- Chris Steinmetz
- Mike Stone
- Stephen Street
- Bruce Swedien
- Bill Szymczyk
- Mike Terry
- Wharton Tiers
- Devin Townsend
- Ken Townshend
- Phil Thornalley
- John Travis
- Michael B. Tretow
- Robert Venable
- Tony Visconti
- Andy Wallace
- Dan Wallin
- Kenneth Wilkinson
- Jonathan Wilson

=== Mastering ===
List
- Tom Coyne
- Mike Dean
- Kevin Gray
- Bernie Grundman
- Steve Hoffman
- Ted Jensen
- Dale Becker
- Bob Katz
- Bob Ludwig
- Rodney Mills
- George Peckham
- Bob Weston
- Gavin Lurssen
- Mike Bozzi

=== Live sound ===
List
- Dan Healy
- "Big Mick" Hughes
- Bruce Jackson
- Bill Porter
- Dave Rat
- Owsley Stanley
- Charles De Schutter

== See also ==
- Category:Audio engineers
- Category:Acoustical engineers
- Institute of Professional Sound
- Professional Lighting and Sound Association
- Audio restoration
- Audiography
- History of sound recording
- Loudness
- Sound follower
- Tape op
