= It Ain't Easy (Ron Davies song) =

- German release picture sleeve

Single by Ron Davies
- B-side: "Silent Song Through the Land"
- Released: 1970
- Length: 2:29
- Label: A&M 1188
- Composer: Ron Davies
- Producer: Chad Stuart

US singles chronology
"It Ain't Easy" (1970)	"Long Hard Climb" (1973)

"It Ain't Easy" is a song written by Ron Davies. It was a hit for him in Canada in 1970. It has since been covered by many other artists, including Three Dog Night, Mitch Ryder's Detroit, Long John Baldry, Dave Edmunds, David Bowie and Dennis Waterman.

== Background ==
The backing musicians on Davies's recording were described by RPM Weekly as Joe Cocker's Mad Dogs & Englishmen group. The backing musicians and singers included Leon Russell on piano, Merry Clayton, Venetta Fields, Clydie King and Mrs. Ron Davies. It appears on the Silent Song Through the Land album that was released on A&M Records.

Over the years the song has been recorded by other artists. Three Dog Night recorded the song which was the flip side to their single, "One Man Band" that was released in 1971. The group Detroit recorded the song which was the A side of their single, released on Paramount in May that year. It was received well by Record World and Cash Box, and it was one of the Nimbus Nine Productions singles that did see some international action. Long John Baldry recorded the song which was included on his 1971 album of the same name. Dave Edmunds covered the song on his 1972 album Rockpile. David Bowie released his version on his 1972 album The Rise and Fall of Ziggy Stardust and the Spiders from Mars. Dennis Waterman recorded a version which was released in 1977. The Raconteurs recorded a version which was released as the B side of their single, "Hands".

== Airplay ==
As shown in Kal Rudman's Money Music section of Record World for the week of 4 July 1970, "It Ain't Easy" was new on the KILT play list. His name was also mis-spelt as Fran Davies.

According to the 12 November 1973 issue of the Walrus, Davies' new release was one to watch. Also, the songs from his U.F.O. album,"It Ain't Easy", "Long Hard Climb" and "Shadows" were Consensus Cuts, which were derived from information obtained by special survey of the Walrus contributors.

== Reception ==
A Cash Box Choice Programming single, "It Ain't Easy" was reviewed in the magazine's 30 May 1970 issue. The reviewer called the song a "Country blues bash with a vocal that will either tear out your brain or win immediate favor". The reviewer also said that there was very good FM play potential. The B side was given as "Yesterday is All I Want".

=== Charts ===
For the week of 1 August 1970, "It Ain't Easy debuted at no. 98 in the RPM 100 Singles chart. The single peaked at no. 55 for the week of 26 September.
