= It Still Ain't Easy =

Studio album by Long John Baldry
- Released: September 24, 1991
- Recorded: 1990–1991
- Studio: Blue Wave Studios
- Genre: Blues
- Length: 55:00
- Label: Stony Plain (SPCD 1163); Hypertension (HYCD 200 122)
- Producer: Tom Lavin

Long John Baldry chronology
A Touch of the Blues (1989)	It Still Ain't Easy (1991)	On Stage Tonight - Baldry's Out! (1993)

Professional ratings
Review scores
Source	Rating
AllMusic	4/5 stars
The Penguin Guide to Blues Recordings	2.5/4 stars

It Still Ain't Easy is the fourteenth studio album by the British-Canadian blues singer Long John Baldry, released in 1991. It marks the 20th anniversary of his US breakthrough album It Ain't Easy in 1971. Much of the material from It Still Ain't Easy was regularly performed in concert.

== Track listing ==
1. "It Still Ain't Easy" (Tom Lavin, David Raven) - 4:04
2. "Midnight In New Orleans" (Len O'Connor, Matthew Horner) - 3:23
3. "One Step Ahead" (Al Walker) - 4:12
4. "I Never Loved Nobody" (Len O'Connor, Matthew Horner, Michael Timothy Jackson) - 4:24
5. "Get It While The Gettin's Good" (Daryl Burgess) - 4:08
6. "What've I Been Drinking" (Jack Lavin) - 2:54
7. "Insane Asylum" (Willie Dixon) - 5:18
8. "You Wanna Dance" (David Brewer) - 4:00
9. "Shake That Thang" (Al Walker) - 3:44
10. "Like You Promised" (Laurie Coyle, Sue Elton, Neil Shilkin, Charles Bell, Corrine Hawkes) - 4:29
11. "Busker" (Tom Lavin, David Raven) - 3:13
12. "Can't Keep From Crying" (Traditional) - 2:07
13. "No More" (Traditional) - 3:16
14. "Soft and Furry" (Eddie Jefferson, Johnny Griffin) - 2:59

== Personnel ==
- Long John Baldry - Vocals and 12 string guitar
- Darryl Bennett - Drums
- Bill Runge - Bass, soprano saxophone
- Teddy Borowiecki - Piano, Keyboards
- Mike Kalanj - Hammond B3
- David Raven - Slide guitar
- Tom Lavin - Lead & rhythm guitar, tambourine, background vocals
- Butch Coulter - Harmonica
- Kathi McDonald - Vocals
- Papa John King - Acoustic guitar
- Amos Garrett - Guitar
- Gaye Delorme - Slide guitar
- Tony Coleman - Drums
- Russell Jackson - Bass
- Willie MacCalder - Piano
- Lucky Peterson - Lead guitar
- Bobby King - Background vocals
- Terry Evans - Background vocals
- Colin James - Lead guitar
- Al Walker - Rhythm guitar
- Laurie Coyle - Guitars
- Corrine Hawkes - Backup vocals
- Kevin O'Brien - Backup vocals
- Neil Shilkin - Bass and drum programming
- Charles Bell Bass and drum programming
- Rene Worst - Bass
- Pat Coleman - Guitar
- Pat Caird - Saxophone
- Recorded and mixed at Blue Wave Studios, 34 West 8th Ave., Vancouver, B.C. Canada V5Y 1M7 (604) 873-3388
- Chief engineer: Perry Barrett
- Second engineer: Marcel Duperreault
- Assistant engineer: Guy Winger
- Arrangements by Tom Lavin, except 'Like You Promised, arr. by Neil Shilkin and Laurie Coyle
- Colin James appears courtesy of Virgin Records
- Bobby King & Terry Evans appear courtesy of Rounder Records
- Lucky Peterson appears courtesy of Alligator Records
- Tony Coleman & Russell Jackson appear courtesy of Antone's Records
- Gaye Delorme appears courtesy of Sony Music
- Design & artwork: Clive Blewchamp
- Typesetting: Cam Westren
- Photography: D. Lippingwell
- Long John Baldry says: "thanks to everyone who helped me pull this one off; they all know who they are! The generous assistance of FACTOR and VideoFACT is also acknowledged."
- Produced by Tom Lavin for Stony Plain Records
