= Way Down South =

Way Down South may refer to:

- Way Down South (film), a 1939 film
- Way Down South (album), a 1990 album by Matt "Guitar" Murphy
- Way Down South, the 1972 reissue of The Delta Sweete, an album by Bobbie Gentry
- "Way Down South", 1912 song by George Fairman
