= Boys like You =

Boys like You may refer to:

- "Boys like You" (Gail Davies song), 1984
- "Boys like You" (360 song), 2011
- "Boys Like You" (Who Is Fancy song), featuring Ariana Grande and Meghan Trainor, 2015
- "Boys Like You" (Itzy song), 2022
- "Boys like You", song by Loretta Lynn from Songs from My Heart, 1965
- "Boys like You", song by Brenda K. Starr from I Want Your Love, 1985
- "Boys like You", song by Leona Naess from I Tried to Rock You But You Only Roll, 2001
- "Boys like You", song by Megan and Liz
- "Boys like You", song by Carter's Chord
- "Boys Like You", song by VVAVES featuring Iggy Azalea, 2019
- "Boys Like You", song by Dodie Clark, 2019
- "Boys Like You", song by Anna Clendening
- "Boys Like You", song by Charlotte Lawrence, 2023
