= The Boys in the Band =

The Boys in the Band may refer to:

== Play and its adaptations ==
- The Boys in the Band (play), a 1968 play by Mart Crowley
  - The Boys in the Band (1970 film), an adaption directed by William Friedkin
  - The Boys in the Band (2020 film), an adaptation directed by Joe Mantello

== Music ==
- Boys in the Band (album), by Long John Baldry, 1980
- Boys in the Band (video), by the Libertines, 2004
- Boys in the Band, an album by Vodka Collins, 2004
- "The Boys in the Band", a song by Gentle Giant from Octopus, 1972
- "Boys in the Band", a song by Mountain from Climbing! 1970
- "Boys in the Band (Boy Band Anthem)", a song by New Kids on the Block, 2019
- "(How Bout a Little Hand For) The Boys in the Band", a song written by Lieber and Stoller, 1970

== Television episodes ==
- "Boys in the Band" (The Fairly OddParents), 2002
- "The Boys in the Band" (Family Guy), 2016
- "Boys in the Band" (Given), 2019
- "The Boys in the Band" (Step by Step), 1992
