= The Other Side of Love (disambiguation) =

"The Other Side of Love" is a 1982 song by Yazoo

The Other Side Of Love or Other Side of Love may also refer to:

== Books ==
- Love, Volume VI: The Other Side of Love, a 1980 romantic novel by Denise Robins
- The Other Side of Love, a 1991 novel about World War II by Jacqueline Briskin

== Film and television ==
- The Other Side of Love, the DVD release name of the 1991 television film Locked Up: A Mother's Rage
- The Other Side of Love, a 2011 Nigerian film with Okawa Shaznay

== Music ==
=== Albums ===
- The Other Side of Love, a 1981 album by Al Campbell
- The Other Side of Love, a 1990 album by Gail Davies
- The Other Side Of Love, a 1993 album by Mad Professor with Carroll Thompson
- The Other Side Of Love, a 2011 album by Amy Stroup, songs written by Trent Dabbs

=== Songs ===
- "Other Side of Love", a song by Sean Paul, 2014
- "The Other Side of Love", a song by The Caravelles, Callander & Murray, 1968
- "The Other Side of Love", a song by Evelyn King from I'm in Love, 1981
- "The Other Side of Love", a song by Evelyn "Champagne" King from the B-side of "I'm in Love", 1981
- "Other Side Of Love", a single by Joe Kubek from Smokin' Joe Kubek, 1985
- "The Other Side of Love", a song by Ryuichi Sakamoto, 1997
- "The Other Side of Love", a song by Shanley Del, written by Leslie Mills, 2002
- "The Other Side of Love", a song by Emyli (m-flo feat. Sister E), 2003
