= Good to Be Alive (Long John Baldry album) =

Album by Long John Baldry

Studio album by Long John Baldry
- Released: 1973
- Recorded: Spring 1973
- Studios: IBC, London
- Genres: Blues, folk, rock
- Length: 42:32
- Labels: GM, Casablanca
- Producer: Jimmy Horowitz

Long John Baldry chronology
| Everything Stops for Tea (1972) | Good to Be Alive (1973) | Welcome to Club Casablanca (1976) |

Professional ratings
Review scores
| Source | Rating |
|---|---|
| The Rolling Stone Record Guide | 2/5 stars |

Good to Be Alive is the seventh studio album by British musician Long John Baldry, released in 1973. It was credited to John Baldry on the cover and spine. The album was produced by Jimmy Horowitz. "Maggie Bell" was an acoustic tribute to the singer of Stone the Crows.

== Track listing ==
1. "Good to Be Alive" (Colin Allen, Zoot Money) – 4:05
2. "Let Me Pass" (Bo Diddley) – 3:18
3. "Rake and Ramblin' Boy" (arranged by Baldry) – 3:27
4. "High and Low" (Jeff Thomas) – 3:43
5. "Gasoline Alley" (Rod Stewart, Ron Wood) – 3:39
6. "I Wish I Was a Rock" (Derroll Adams) – 1:18
7. "Up in the Trees" (Neil Shepherd) – 2:51
8. "Brand New Day" (Al Kooper) – 3:17
9. "Song for Martin Luther King" (Baldry) – 4:14
10. "Maggie Bell" (Baldry) – 3:06
11. "Let's Go" (Chas Jankel) – 2:39
12. "She" – duet with Lisa Strike (Chris Ethridge, Gram Parsons) – 4:38

== Personnel ==
- Long John Baldry – 12-string guitar, vocals
- Dave Ball – guitar
- Denny Ball – bass guitar
- Terry Cox – drums
- Jimmy Horowitz – keyboards
- Sam Mitchell – steel guitar, dobro
- Chris Hughes – tenor saxophone
- Lesley Duncan, Lisa Strike, Susie Glover, Kay Garner – backing vocals

Additional musicians

- Tony Newman – drums (tracks 5, 7)
- Mike Driscoll – drums (track 1)
- John Mealing – organ (track 1)
- Bob Cohen – guitar on (track 1)
- Andy Bown – acoustic guitar (track 9)
- Pete Stanley – banjo (tracks 5–7)
- John Field, Mike French – fiddle (tracks 5, 7)
- Lesley Duncan – lead vocal (track 3)
- Neil Shepherd – lead vocal (track 7)
- Liza Strike – lead vocal (track 12)
- The Pop Arts Strings – strings, brass

Technical

- Jimmy Horowitz – producer, arranger
- Andy Knight, Mike Claydon – engineers
- Steve Campbell – photography
- David Fields – cover art
- Mike Gill – cover design
