= Grandma's Song =

Single by Gail Davies

from the album I'll Be There
- B-side: "Mama's Gonna Give You Sweet Things"
- Released: July 1981
- Recorded: April 1980; Hollywood, CA, US
- Genre: Country
- Length: 4:05
- Label: Warner Bros. Nashville
- Songwriter(s): Gail Davies
- Producer(s): Gail Davies

Gail Davies singles chronology
"It's a Lovely, Lovely World" (1981)	"Grandma's Song" (1981)	"Round the Clock Lovin'" (1982)

"Grandma's Song" is a song written and recorded by American country music artist Gail Davies. The song was recorded for Davies' self-titled 1978 debut album. A re-recorded version from her 1981 album I'll Be There was released as the album's third single in July 1981.

The song was written by Gail Davies as a tribute to her grandmother, Frances Marion Whitten. Davies features her grandmother's singing voice at the beginning of the track, singing part of "The Fox Hunting Song", a popular folk song. "Grandma's Song" was recorded in April 1980 at the "Producer's Workshop" recording studio in Hollywood, California, United States. Davies produced the session herself and recorded the rest of her third studio album, I'll Be There, during this one session.

"Grandma's Song" was released as a single via Warner Bros. Records in July 1981, peaking at number nine on the Billboard Hot Country Singles chart later that year. The single became Davies' fourth Billboard top-ten hit and her third top-ten single from her album I'll Be There. Additionally, the single peaked within the top-twenty on the Canadian RPM Country Tracks chart in 1981.

== Chart performance ==
Chart (1981)	Peak position
Canada Country Songs (RPM)	17
US Hot Country Singles (Billboard	9
