= The Blues Don't Bother Me! =

Studio album by Matt "Guitar" Murphy
- Released: March 26, 1996
- Recorded: Northlake Sound
- Genre: Blues
- Length: 39:13
- Label: Roesch
- Producer: Joe Roesch

Matt "Guitar" Murphy chronology
Way Down South (1990)	The Blues Don't Bother Me! (1996)	Lucky Charm (2000)

Professional ratings
Review scores
Source	Rating
AllMusic	3/5 stars

The Blues Don't Bother Me! is Matt "Guitar" Murphy's second solo album, first released in 1996 with Roesch Records. It includes contributions by his nephew, Floyd Murphy, Jr.

The title recording was licensed by Universal Records as the second track on the Blues Brothers 2000 Original Motion Picture Soundtrack, which earned the RIAA Certified Gold Award of 500,000 units sold, on March 16, 1998.

== Track listing ==
All tracks are written by Matt "Guitar" Murphy, unless otherwise noted.

No.	Title	Length
1.	"Ungrateful Woman"	5:40
2.	"The Blues Don't Bother Me"	3:37
3.	"Some Sanctified Funk"	2:00
4.	"I Can't Hang"	3:46
5.	"I Can Cry on My Own" (Floyd Murphy, Jr., Matt "Guitar" Murphy)	3:02
6.	"Strut Your Stuff"	3:04
7.	"Bye Bye Texas"	3:18
8.	"It's Been a Long, Long Time"	3:52
9.	"We're Gonna Have a Party"	2:52
10.	"Bip Bop"	5:01
11.	"I Ain't Got No Time" (Floyd Murphy, Jr., Matt "Guitar" Murphy)	3:01

== Personnel ==
- Matt "Guitar" Murphy – composer, guitar, primary artist, producer, vocals
- Floyd Murphy, Jr. – composer, drums, guitar (rhythm), percussion
- Jim Biggens – saxophone (tenor)
- Baron Raymonde – saxophone (alto)
- Joe Roesch – drums
- Roger Young – piano
- Scott Spray – bass
- Eric Udel – bass
- Gary "Sonny, Jr." Onofrio – harmonica
- Howard Eldridge – vocals

Support

- Joe Roesch – executive producer, liner notes, mixing
- Sable Roesch – associate producer
- Basil Grabovsky – digital editing
- Randy King – mastering
- Bob Kuttruff – engineer
- Keith Lo Bue – illustrations
- Vic Steffens – mixing
