= Way Down South (album) =

Studio album by Matt "Guitar" Murphy
- Released: 1990
- Studio: Studio D, Austin, TX, United States
- Genre: Blues
- Length: 46:52
- Label: Discovery
- Producer: Clifford Antone

Matt "Guitar" Murphy chronology
Way Down South (1990)	The Blues Don't Bother Me! (1996)

Way Down South is the debut solo album by Matt "Guitar" Murphy, released in 1990 via Discovery Records. It includes contributions by his brother Floyd.

== Critical reception ==
Professional ratings
Review scores
Source	Rating
AllMusic	4.5/5 stars

The Toronto Star called the album "a languid, liquid masterpiece".

The record is listed as an "Album Pick" on AllMusic. Reviewing for the site, Bill Dahl commented that the guitarist "acquits himself most competently here, mixing blues, funk, R&B, and a little jazz into his sparkling fretwork. His brother Floyd Murphy, a Memphis blues guitar legend himself, is on hand for a family reunion."

== Track listing ==
All tracks are written by Matt "Guitar" Murphy, unless otherwise stated.

Side one
No.	Title	Length
1.	"Way Down South"	4:33
2.	"Big Six"	4:48
3.	"Gonna Be Some Changes Made"	3:18
4.	"Big City Takedown" (Floyd Murphy)	4:43
5.	"Buck's Boogie"	4:28

Side two
No.	Title	Length
1.	"Thump Tyme" (Floyd Murphy, Matt "Guitar" Murphy)	3:39
2.	"Matt's Guitar Boogie, No. 2"	3:10
3.	"Low Down and Dirty"	5:19
4.	"Gimme Somma Dat"	6:43
5.	"Blue Walls"	6:11

== Personnel ==
- Matt "Guitar" Murphy – composer, guitar, primary artist, producer, vocals
- Mark "Kaz" Kazanoff – saxophone
- Derek O'Brien – guitar (rhythm)
- Floyd Murphy – guitar, drums, composer
- Mel Brown – piano
- Eugene Carrier – organ, piano
- Chester King – harmonica
- Russell Jackson – bass
- Tony Coleman – drums
- Donna Pearl – vocals (background)
- Angela Strehli – guest artist, vocals (background)

Support

- Mark Guerra – photography
- Malcolm Harper – editing
- Bill Narum – art direction
- Derek O'Brien – assistant producer, engineer, mixing, production assistant
- Jim O'Neal – liner notes
- Stuart Sullivan – engineer
- James Tuttle – engineer, mixing
- Sam Yeates – artwork, illustrations
