= Stop Her on Sight (S.O.S.) =

Single by Edwin Starr
- B-side: "I Have Faith in You"
- Released: January 1966
- Recorded: 1966
- Genre: R&B; soul; Northern soul
- Length: 2:08
- Label: Ric-Tic Records (US); Polydor Records (UK)
- Songwriters: Albert Hamilton; Richard Morris; Edwin Starr (the latter sometimes credited to Starr's birth name of Charles Hatcher)
- Producers: Al Kent; Richard Morris

Edwin Starr singles chronology
"Back Street" (1965)	"Stop Her on Sight (S.O.S.)" (1966)	"I'll Love You Forever" (1966)

"Stop Her on Sight (S.O.S.)" is a song written in 1966 by Albert Hamilton, Richard Morris, and Edwin Starr. It was initially released by Starr as a single in the United States in January that year on Ric-Tic Records. The track was released on Polydor Records in the UK in April 1966.

The track was produced by co-writer Richard Morris and Al Kent, using the popular elements of the Motown Sound. It was Starr's third consecutive chart hit, following on from his earlier releases of "Agent OO Soul" and "Back Street". AllMusic noted that "everything about this record is remarkably crisp".

The track was popular on the UK's Northern soul scene. As of August 2022, copies of the original vinyl single sell online for in excess of £35 ($43).

== Charts ==
Chart (1966)	Peak position
US Billboard Hot 100	48
US Billboard R&B Singles	9
US Record World 100 Top Pops	45
UK Singles Chart	35

Chart (1969)	Peak position
UK Singles Chart	11

== Other versions ==
Various cover versions of the song were recorded by Deon Jackson (1966), Long John Baldry (Looking at Long John, 1966), Bob Kuban and the In-Men (1966), Cliff Bennett and the Rebel Rousers (1967), The Foundations (1968), Alan Caddy Orchestra & Singers (1970), and Rare Earth (1978) among others.
