= Round the Clock Lovin' =

Single by Gail Davies

from the album Givin' Herself Away
- B-side: "It's Amazing What a Little Love Can Do"
- Released: January 1982
- Recorded: July 1981; Hollywood, CA, U.S.
- Label: Warner Bros. Nashville
- Songwriter(s): Rory Bourke; K. T. Oslin
- Producer(s): Gail Davies

Gail Davies singles chronology
"Grandma's Song" (1981)	"Round the Clock Lovin'" (1982)	"You Turn Me On, I'm a Radio" (1982)

"Round the Clock Lovin'" is a song written by Rory Bourke and K.T. Oslin. It was recorded by American country artist Gail Davies and was released as a single via Warner Bros. Records in 1982. The song was recorded in July 1981 at the "Producer's Workshop" in Hollywood, California, United States. The session was produced entirely by Davies among previous sessions.

Released as a single in January 1982, "Round the Clock Lovin'" reached a peak of number nine on the Billboard Hot Country Singles chart. The song would become Davies' final top-ten hit on any Billboard chart. Additionally, the single peaked within the top-twenty on the Canadian RPM Country Tracks chart in 1981.

Co-writer K.T. Oslin would in later years would become a major country music artist herself. "Round the Clock Lovin'" has often been described as a catalyst for Oslin's early career. Oslin recorded her own version of the song on her 1988 album This Woman. Oslin's version served as the B-side to her 1989 single "Didn't Expect It to Go Down This Way".

== Chart performance ==
Chart (1982)	Peak position
Canada Country Songs (RPM)	13
US Hot Country Singles (Billboard)	9
