= Everything Stops for Tea =

Studio album by John Baldry
- Released: May 1972
- Recorded: January–February 1972
- Studios: IBC Studios, London; Morgan Studios, London
- Genres: Blues-rock, folk rock
- Label: Warner Bros.
- Producers: Elton John (Side one), Rod Stewart (Side two)

John Baldry chronology
It Ain't Easy (1971)	Everything Stops for Tea (1972)	Good to Be Alive (1973)

Professional ratings
Review scores
Source	Rating
AllMusic	4/5 stars

Everything Stops for Tea is the sixth studio album by British musician John Baldry, released in May 1972. It was produced by Elton John and Rod Stewart. Elton provides vocal accompaniment on tracks 1, 3–5. Stewart provides vocal accompaniment and plays banjo on track 8.

Several standout songs include the two Willie Dixon penned cuts, "Seventh Son" and "You Can't Judge a Book by the Cover"; as well as the Dixie Cups song "Iko Iko". This album along with his previous offering It Ain't Easy were the beginning of Baldry's return to the blues after his pop years in the late 1960s. Several songs were released as singles by Warner Bros. including "Mother Ain't Dead", "Iko Iko" and "You Can't Judge a Book by the Cover".

Ronnie Wood drew the cover art which portrays Baldry as the Mad Hatter. The album peaked at No.189 on the Billboard 200.

== Track listing ==
1. "Intro: Come Back Again" (Ross Wilson) – 4:05
2. "Seventh Son" (Willie Dixon) – 3:07
3. "Wild Mountain Thyme" (Traditional; arranged by John Baldry and Davey Johnstone) – 3:49
4. "Iko Iko" (Sharon Jones, Jesse Thomas, Joe Jones, Mary Lynn Jones) – 3:10
5. "Jubilee Cloud" (John Kongos, Peter Leroy) – 4:16
6. "Everything Stops for Tea" (Al Goodhart, Al Hoffman, Maurice Sigler) – 3:09 (from the 1935 musical film Come Out of the Pantry)
7. "You Can't Judge a Book by the Cover" (Dixon) – 4:21
8. "Mother Ain't Dead" (Traditional) – 2:55
9. "Hambone" (Sam Mitchell) – 3:48
10. "Lord Remember Me" (Myrtle Jackson) – 4:08
11. "Armit's Trousers" (Ian Armit) – 1:45

Additionally the following tracks were added as bonus tracks on the re-release of the album in 2005:

1. "Radio Spot #1" – 1:06
2. "Bring My Baby Back to Me" (Live) – 6:26
3. "Only Love Can Break Your Heart" (Featuring Joyce Everson) (Neil Young) – 3:13
4. "I'm Just a Rake and Ramblin' Boy" (Featuring Joyce Everson) – 3:27
5. "Radio Spot #2" – 0:57

== Personnel ==
- John Baldry - vocals, guitar
- Elton John - backing vocals (tracks 1, 3–5)
- Rod Stewart - banjo and backing vocals on "Mother Ain't Dead"
- Madeline Bell - backing vocals on "You Can't Judge a Book"
- Jimmy Horowitz - organ on "You Can't Judge a Book"
- Davey Johnstone - guitar, mandolin, piano (tracks 1–5)
- Sam Mitchell - steel guitar on "Hambone"
- Doris Troy - backing vocals on "You Can't Judge a Book" and "Lord Remember Me"
- Ian Armit - piano (tracks 5, 6, 9, 11)
- Ray Cooper - percussion (tracks 1, 4, 5)
- Stefan Delft - viola on "Wild Mountain Thyme"
- John Dentith - drums on "You Can't Judge a Book" and "Lord Remember Me"
- James Litherland - guitar on "You Can't Judge a Book" and "Lord Remember Me"
- Nigel Olsson - drums
- John Porter - bass guitar on "Hambone"
- Klaus Voormann - bass guitar
- Barry St. John - backing vocals on "Lord Remember Me"
- Terry Stannard - drums on "Hambone"
- Liza Strike - vocals, backing vocals (tracks 6, 7, 10)
- Micky Waller - percussion on "You Can't Judge a Book"
- Bob Weston - guitar on "You Can't Judge a Book" and "Lord Remember Me"
- Bill Smith - bass guitar on "You Can't Judge a Book" and "Lord Remember Me"

== Charts ==
Chart (1972)	Peak position
US Billboard Top LPs & Tape	180
