= Looking at Long John =

Studio album by Long John Baldry
- Released: 1966
- Recorded: 1965
- Genres: Rhythm and Blues, blue-eyed soul
- Length: 30:53
- Label: United Artists
- Producer: Martin Davis

Long John Baldry chronology
Long John's Blues (1965)	Looking at Long John (1966)	Let the Heartaches Begin (1968)

Professional ratings
Review scores
Source	Rating
AllMusic	3/5 stars

Looking at Long John is the second studio album by British musician Long John Baldry released in 1966. In 1995, Long John's Blues / Looking at Long John was released on CD. It has since been re-released and remastered on Looking at Long John: The UA Years. The orchestral arrangements were conducted by Bob Leaper; except "Turn On Your Love Light" which was by Charles Blackwell.

== Track listing ==
1. "You've Lost That Loving Feeling" (Barry Mann, Phil Spector, Cynthia Weil) – 3:22
2. "Only a Fool Breaks His Own Heart" (Norman Bergen, Shelly Coburn) – 2:44
3. "Make It Easy On Yourself" (Burt Bacharach, Hal David) – 2:58
4. "Let Him Go (and Let Me Love You)" (Lockie Edwards Jr., Robert Maxwell) – 2:12
5. "Drifter" (Richard Gottehrer, Bob Feldman, Jerry Goldstein) – 3:03
6. "Cry Me a River" (Arthur Hamilton) – 3:01
7. "Stop Her on Sight (S.O.S.)" (Richard Morris, Albert Hamilton, Charles Hatcher) – 1:56
8. "Turn On Your Love Light" (Deadric Malone, Joseph Scott) – 2:07
9. "I Love Paris" (Cole Porter) – 2:13
10. 'Keep on Running" (Jackie Edwards) – 2:16
11. "Ain't Nothing You Can Do" (Deadric Malone, Joseph Scott) – 2:31
12. "Bad Luck Soul" (Ann Martin, David Gussin) – 2:22
