= Long John's Blues =

Studio album by Long John Baldry
- Released: 1964
- Recorded: 1964
- Studio: IBC Studios, London
- Genre: Blues; rhythm and blues; jazz
- Length: 42:32
- Label: United Artists
- Producer: Ron Belchier; Martin Davis; Jack Good

Long John Baldry chronology
R&B from the Marquee (1962)	Long John's Blues (1964)	Looking at Long John (1966)

Professional ratings
Review scores
Source	Rating
AllMusic	4/5 stars
Record Mirror	4/5 stars

Long John's Blues is the debut solo album by British blues singer Long John Baldry and his band, the Hoochie Coochie Men, featuring musicians who had previously played alongside Baldry in the Cyril Davies All-Stars. The album featured a track list that he would continue to play at live shows throughout his career.

In 1995 Long John's Blues / Looking at Long John was released on CD. It has since been re-released and remastered on Looking at Long John: The UA Years. The album had a vinyl reissue in 2009.

== Track listing ==
1. "I Got My Mojo Workin'" (Preston Foster) – 3:13
2. "Gee Baby Ain't I Good to You" (Don Redman, Andy Razaf) – 3:57
3. "Roll 'Em Pete" (Pete Johnson) – 3:32
4. "You're Breaking My Heart" (B.B. King, Joe Josea) – 4:36
5. "Hoochie Coochie Man" (Willie Dixon) – 3:50
6. "Everyday (I Have the Blues)" (Peter Chatman) – 3:04
7. "Dimples" (John Lee Hooker) – 2:22
8. "Five Long Years" (Eddie Boyd) – 5:11
9. "My Babe" (Dixon) – 2:36
10. "Times Are Getting Tougher Than Tough" (Jimmy Witherspoon) – 2:28
11. "Goin' Down Slow" (James Burke Oden) – 3:57
12. "Rock the Joint" (John Baldry) – 3:53

== Personnel ==
- Long John Baldry – vocals, guitar

The Hoochie Coochie Men

- Cliff Barton – bass guitar
- Bill Law – drums
- Geoff Bradford – guitar, harmonica
- Ian Armit – piano

Technical

- Ron Belchier – producer
- Martin Davis – producer (track 6)
- Jack Good – producer (track 7)
- Norman Seeff – art direction
- John Van Hamersveld – album cover design

== Original album ==
This album features many of the musicians from the Hoochie Coochie Men, Baldry's band at the time, although, for contractual reasons, Rod Stewart is notably absent. It includes songs such as "Got My Mojo Working," "Goin' Down Slow" and "Everyday I Have the Blues," which became staples of Baldry's live shows throughout his career. Released on CD in 2006.

== Long John's Blues 1971 ==
Long John's Blues (1971)

Studio album by Long John Baldry
- Released: 1971
- Recorded: 1964–1966
- Genre: Blues, Jazz
- Length: 43:00
- Label: United Artists

Baldry's 1964 album for United Artists was reissued for America with a gatefold sleeve showing photos and clippings from the era. The bonus on this record is the inclusion of Baldry's duet with Rod Stewart on Sister Rosetta Tharpe's "Up Above My Head", the B-side to Baldry's 1964 single "You'll Be Mine."

=== Track listing ===
1. "Rock The Joint" (Long John Baldry) – 3:53
2. "Times Are Getting Tougher Than Tough" (Jimmy Witherspoon) – 2:28
3. "I Got My Mojo Workin'" (Preston Foster) – 3:13
4. "Everyday (I Have The Blues)" (Peter Chatman) – 3:04
5. "You're Breaking My Heart" – 4:36
6. "Bring My Baby Back to Me" (Baldry) – 3:25
7. "Up Above My Head (There's Music in the Air)" (Sister Rosetta Tharpe) – 2:48
8. "Dimples" (John Lee Hooker) – 2:22
9. "Five Long Years" (Eddie Boyd) – 5:11
10. "Gee Baby, Ain't I Good to You?" (Don Redman, Andy Razaf) – 3:57
11. "Goin' Down Slow" (James Burke Oden) – 3:57
12. "Roll 'Em Pete" (Pete Johnson) – 3:32
