= You're a Hard Dog (To Keep Under the Porch) =

Single by Gail Davies

from the album What Can I Say
- B-side: "The Boy in You Is Showing"
- Released: September 1983
- Recorded: June 1983
- Studio: Woodland (Nashville, Tennessee)
- Label: Warner Bros. Nashville
- Songwriters: Susanna Clark; Harlan Howard
- Producer: Gail Davies

Gail Davies singles chronology
"Singing the Blues" (1983)	"You're a Hard Dog (To Keep Under the Porch)" (1983)	"Boys Like You" (1984)

"You're a Hard Dog (To Keep Under the Porch)" is a song written by Susanna Clark and Harlan Howard. It was originally recorded by American country artist Gail Davies for her fifth studio album entitled What Can I Say.

The song was recorded in June 1983 at the Woodland Studios, located in Nashville, Tennessee, United States. The session was produced entirely by Davies, who had been self-producing her recording sessions for several years. Released as a single in September 1983, "You're a Hard Dog (To Keep Under the Porch)" reached the eighteenth position on the Billboard Magazine Hot Country Singles chart. The single became Davies' ninth top-twenty hit on the Billboard country chart. In addition, the single peaked within the top-twenty on the Canadian RPM Country Tracks chart.

== Chart performance ==
Chart (1983–1984)	Peak position
Canada Country Songs (RPM)	20
US Hot Country Singles (Billboard)	18
