= Remembering Leadbelly =

Studio album by Long John Baldry
- Released: November 13, 2001
- Recorded: 2000–2001
- Genre: Blues
- Length: 58:00
- Label: Stony Plain

Long John Baldry chronology
Evening Conversation (2000)	Remembering Leadbelly (2001)	Boogie Woogie: The Warner Bros. Recordings (2005)

Professional ratings
Review scores
Source	Rating
The Penguin Guide to Blues Recordings	2.5/4 stars

Remembering Leadbelly is the sixteenth and final studio album Long John Baldry completed in his lifetime. The album serves as a tribute to Baldry's musical hero Lead Belly with songs he either wrote or is known for. The album was released on November 13, 2001 in North America and on August 12, 2002 internationally.

== Track listing ==
1. "Lining Track" - 1:49
2. "Gallows Pole" - 2:42
3. "Midnight Special" - 3:29
4. "Take This Hammer" - 3:28
5. "Rock Island Line" - 2:50
6. "Good Morning Blues" - 3:45
7. "Go Down Old Hannah" - 0:55
8. "Birmingham Jail" - 2:52
9. "Here Rattler" - 2:14
10. "Easy Rider Blues" - 3:09
11. "We're In The Same Boat Brother" - 3:33
12. "John Hardy" - 2:30
13. "Digging My Potatoes" - 3:10
14. "On A Christmas Day" - 2:50
15. "Mary Don't You Weep" - 2:35
16. "We Shall Walk Through The Valley" - 3:42
17. "Alan Lomax Interview" - 5:56
18. "Long John Baldry Interview" - 6:36

== Personnel ==
- Long John Baldry - vocals, 12-string guitar
- Kathi McDonald - vocals
- Hans Stamer - vocals, national steel guitar, harmonica, jews harp, trumpet
- Chris Nordquist - drums, hans-on drums, finger cymbals
- John Lee Sanders - piano, organ, keyboard tuba, keyboard accordion, vocals, harmonica & other keyboards
- Andreas Schuld - acoustic guitar, electric guitar, ukulele, Russian zither, e-bow, percussion, claps, foot, national steel, vocals, slide
- Norm Fisher - acc. bass
- Jesse Zubot - fiddle, mandolin, violin
- Butch Coulter - harmonica
- Tom Colclough - clarinet
- Sybel Thrasher - vocals
- Tyee Montessori Elementary School - backing vocals 'On A Christmas Day'.
- Produced by Andreas Schuld for Stony Plain Records
- Executive producer: Holger Peterson
- Recorded at Music Lab Recording, Sebastian and Dolly's Hutch, Skeena's Place, all Vancouver, Canada
- Butch Coulter was recorded at Halve Recording Studios, Hamburg, Germany
- Mastering: Peter Moore, MDI Productions, Toronto
- Bonus track interviews by Holger Peterson
- Special thanks to Alan Lomax for making himself available at the 1993 W.C. Handy Awards in Memphis, Tennessee
