= Charles De Schutter =

Belgian musical producer and sound engineer

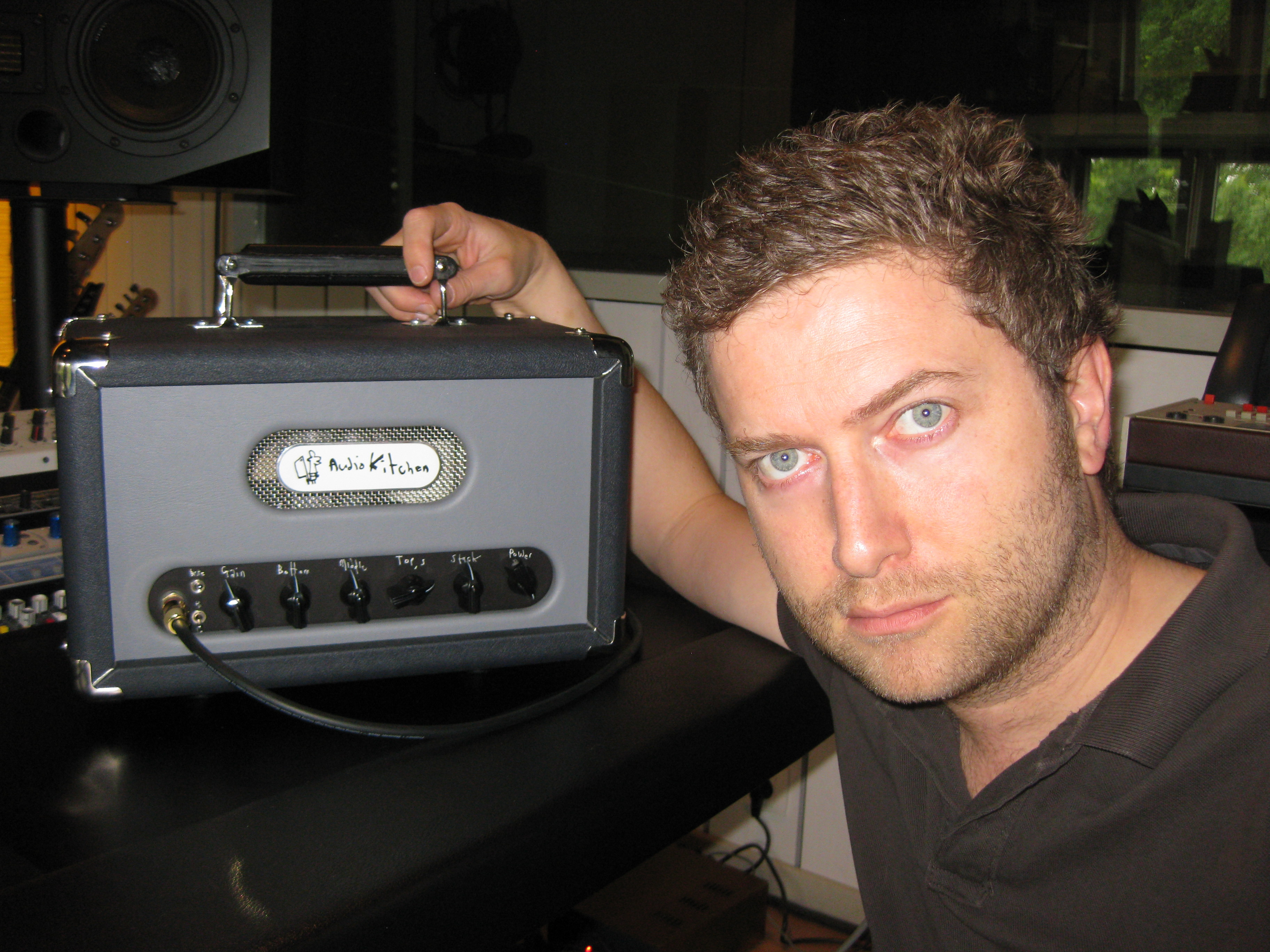
Charles and his Audio Kitchen

Charles De Schutter was born in Brussels in December 1975. He is a Belgian musical producer and sound engineer. In February 2014 he won a "Victoire de la Musique" in France for the best live act with -M-.

== Selected discography ==
Artists	Live/Studio	Rewards	Records Compagnies / Labels
1000 Women : "LP"	Studio/Live	-	HKM
Baloji	Studio/Live	-	Universal Belgium
Blackfeet Revolution : "EP"	Studio	-	Santo Muerte
César : "La Faim" "Infréquentables"	Studio	-	-
Daphné D. : "100% Magenta"	Studio	-	Tattoo
Dominik Nicolas : "LP"	Studio	-	-
Duplex : "EP"	Studio	-	Atmosphériques
Edake : “Decadence and Poetry”	Studio	-	-
Elliott Murphy : "LP"	Studio/Live	-	-
Elvis Black Stars	Studio/Live	-	-
Empyr : “Your Skin My Skin” “Say it”	Studio	-	Sony BMG
Ghinzu	Live	-	-
Hudson : "EP" "LP"	Studio/Live	-	-
Kid Noize : “Brooklin”	Studio	-	-
Komah	Studio/Live	-	-
Krisdane	Live	-	-
Kyo : "Best Of"	Live	-	Sony BMG
Lady Lo : "EP"	Studio	-	-
Matthieu Chedid -M- : “Labo M2” “Live 2013/2014" “Faites moi souffrir” “Bouboule (soundtrack)” “J ai embrassé une fille (soundtrack)”	Studio/Live	Best Show "Victoires de la Musique" (France)	Universal/Barclay; Universal/Barclay
Misia : "Ruas" "Senhora da Noite"	Studio	-	Universal/AZ
Mud Flow	Live	-	-
Mystical Machine Gun : "EP"	Studio	-	Santo Muerte
Natal : "LP"	Studio	-	-
No One Is Innocent : "Drugstore"	Studio	-	Naïve
Normandy All Stars : "LP"	Studio	-	-
Ozark Henry	Live	-	-
Pleymo : “Ce Soir C’est Grand Soir”	Studio/Live	Gold	Sony BMG
Recorders	Live	-	-
RIVIERA : “Holy Fire” EP	Studio	-	Mantraa Corp
Romano Nervoso : “Italian Stallions” "LP"	Studio	-	-
Stereogrand : "Yeah Yeah"	Studio	-	-
Superbus : "Live à Paris" "Lova Lova" "Anniversary Best Of"	Studio/Live	Gold; Platinum; Gold	Universal/Mercury; Universal/Mercury; Universal/Polydor
The Bikinians : "EP"	Studio/Live	-	-
The Dukes	Studio	-	-
Uman	Studio	-	-
Va à la Plage : "EP"	Studio	-	-
Vegas : “An Hour With” "Everything You Know Is Wrong"	Studio	-	Universal Belgium
Vegastar : "Television"	Studio	-	Sony BMG
Vincent Scarito : "Beings"	Studio	-	-
Vismets : "Guru Voodoo"	Studio	-	-
Wonderama : "EP"	Studio	-	Universal/Polydor
Romano Nervoso : "Born to Boogie"	Studio		Mottow Soundz
Romano Nervoso : "The Return of the Rocking Dead"	Studio		Mottow Soundz

== Link ==
Official website : - http://www.charlesdeschutter.com
