= Evening Conversation =

Live album by Long John Baldry
- Released: October 17, 2000
- Recorded: September 21, 1999
- Genre: Blues
- Length: 67:00
- Label: Stony Plain Records, Hypertension-Music
- Producer: Helge Halvé, Butch Coulter

Long John Baldry chronology
Let The Heartaches Begin: The Pye Anthology (1998)	Evening Conversation (2000)	Remembering Leadbelly (2001)

Professional ratings
Review scores
Source	Rating
The Penguin Guide to Blues Recordings	2.5/4 stars

Evening Conversation (a.k.a. Long John Baldry Trio Live) is Long John Baldry's second live record, which was captured at the Downtown Blues Club in Hamburg, Germany in Sept 1999. Baldry was accompanied by long-time friend Butch Coulter and British guitarist Matt Taylor. Baldry performs acoustic versions of "Morning Dew", "Who Back Buck", "Flying", "Maggie Bell" and "Backwater Blues".

== Track listing ==
1. "Good Morning Blues" (Traditional) - 5:28
2. "Who Back Buck" (Traditional) - 2:40
3. "Back Water Blues" (Traditional) - 7:47
4. "Morning Dew" (Tim Rose, Bonnie Dobson) - 4:14
5. "Black Girl" (Traditional) - 3:22
6. "It Ain't Easy" (Ron Davies) - 4:17
7. "Burn Down The Cornfield" (Randy Newman) - 5:58
8. "Moon Dance in Tajikistan" (Butch Coulter) - 4:15 (Butch Coulter solo)
9. "Walk On" (Sonny Terry, Brownie McGhee) - 5:54 (Matt Taylor lead vocals)
10. "Can't Keep From Crying Some Time" (Traditional) - 2:22
11. "Maggie Bell" (Long John Baldry) - 3:33
12. "Blue Valentine" (Tom Waits) - 5:55 (Matt Taylor solo)
13. "Midnight in New Orleans" (Len O'Connell) - 4:32
14. "Flying" (Rod Stewart, Ronnie Wood, Ronnie Lane) - 6:05

== Personnel ==
- Long John Baldry - vocals and 12 string guitar
- Matt Taylor - electric and acoustic guitar, vocals
- Butch Coulter - harmonica and acoustic guitar
- Christina Lux - vocals on "Black Girl"
- Recorded by Helge Halvé
- Mixed and Produced by Helge Halvé and Butch Coulter
- Mastered by Helge Halvé at Recording Service Halvé in Hamburg
- Road manager: Jens Becker, Christian Seul
- Executive producer: Christian Thiel

== Album ==
Another live recording from Germany, this was recorded in September 1999 at the "Downtown Blues Club" in Hamburg and features Butch Coulter and young U.K. guitarist Matt Taylor. The recording is a replica of Baldry's acoustic shows, featuring blues material such as "Good Morning Blues," "Can't Keep from Crying Some Times" and "Back Water Blues."
