= Ron Davies (songwriter) =

American singer-songwriter (1946–2003)

- Born: 15 January 1946; United States
- Died: 30 October 2003 (aged 57)
- Occupations: Musician, songwriter

Ronny Wayne "Ron" Davies (January 15, 1946 – October 30, 2003) was an American songwriter and musician. He was described by CMT News at the time of his death as "the family's artistic trailblazer" although "less celebrated… than his [younger] sister, singer/songwriter and producer Gail Davies."

== Background ==
The son of country singer Tex Dickerson, Ron took the name Davies after he and his siblings were adopted by their stepfather, Darby Davies. He began his professional songwriting career at the age of 17, when he wrote an entire album of songs (Outburst!) for the Tacoma, Washington-based Wailers. He released two albums of his own on A&M Records, Silent Song Through the Land and U. F. O, which he co-produced with Grammy Award-winning engineer Tommy Vicari.

== Career ==
=== It Ain't Easy (album) and single ===
Working with session musicians, Chad Stuart, Jim Keltner, Demetri Callas, Mike Deasy, Larry Knechtel, Mike Lang, and backing vocalists, Clydie King, Merry Clayton, and Vanetta Fields, Davies recorded his album, Silent Song Through the Land, which was released in 1970. The album had a positive review in the 1 August 1970 issue of RPM Weekly. The reviewer referred to Davies as a rapidly rising talent who had Tim Hardin among his admirers. The music on the album was referred to as irresistible swamp and other influenced rock. Also that week, his single, "It Ain't Easy" debuted at no. 98 in the RPM 100 Singles chart.. The single peaked at no. 55 for the week of 26 September.

For the week of 21 November, his album was on the Record World FM Airplay Chart for WMMR in Philadelphia.

Davies' song "It Ain't Easy" was covered by Three Dog Night (on their album of the same name), Long John Baldry (as title song of his 1971 album), David Bowie (on his 1972 Ziggy Stardust album), Dave Edmunds, and Grammy Award winner Shelby Lynne, among others; his "Long, Hard Climb" by Helen Reddy and Maria Muldaur; “Silent Song Through the Land” by the Association; "The Man I Used to Be" by Jerry Jeff Walker; and "Waitin' on a Dark-Eyed Girl" by the Nitty Gritty Dirt Band.

=== Further activities ===
According to the 12 November 1973 issue of the Walrus, Davies' new release was one to watch. Also, the songs from his U.F.O. album,"It Ain't Easy", "Long Hard Climb" and "Shadows" were Consensus Cuts, which were derived from information obtained by special survey of the Walrus contributors. He was also a new addition to WBRU-FM, WPHD-FM. and approximately fifteen other stations.

Davies moved to Nashville, Tennessee in 1985 where he wrote for Cedarwood Publishing and later for Warner/Chappell Music. Although not a professional actor, he played the lead role in the George Jones video Cold Hard Truth in 1999.

== Death ==
Davies died of a heart attack at his home in Nashville on October 30, 2003.

== Later years ==
In 2013 an album of his songs entitled Unsung Hero: A Tribute to the Music of Ron Davies was released. Produced by his sister, Gail Davies, this album features 22 well-known artists including John Prine, Dolly Parton, Vince Gill, Alison Krauss, Delbert McClinton, Crystal Gayle, Rodney Crowell, and jazz legend Benny Golson.

== Discography ==
- Silent Song Through The Land (1970)
- U. F. O (1973)
- I Don't Believe It (1978)
- Lucky To Be Alive (2000) (self released)
- It Ain't Easy (2001) (self released)
- Where Does The Time Go (2003)
- The Kitchen Tapes (2014) (Posthumous)
