= Boys like You (Gail Davies song) =

Single by Gail Davies

from the album What Can I Say
- B-side: "What Can I Say"
- Released: March 1984
- Recorded: June 1983; Nashville, TN, U.S.
- Label: Warner Bros. Nashville
- Songwriter(s): Gail Davies; Walker Igleheart
- Producer(s): Gail Davies

Gail Davies singles chronology
"You're a Hard Dog (To Keep Under the Porch)" (1983)	"Boys like You" (1984)	"It's You Alone" (1984)

"Boys like You" is a song written by Gail Davies and Walker Igleheart. It was recorded and released as a single by Davies, an American country artist. It was released on her fifth studio record entitled What Can I Say.

"Boys like You" was originally recorded in June 1983 at the "Groundstar Recording Lab", located in Nashville, Tennessee, United States. "It's You Alone" (a song written by her brother Ron Davies) was also recorded during this session and would be released as Davies' next single. The song's session was produced completely by Davies. "Boys like You" was released as the second single from her album What Can I Say. Released in March 1984, the single peaked at number nineteen on the Billboard Magazine Hot Country Singles & Tracks chart, becoming Davies' tenth "top-twenty" hit. In addition, the single peaked within the top-thirty on the Canadian RPM Country Tracks chart.

== Chart performance ==
Chart (1984)	Peak position
Canada Country Songs (RPM)	26
US Hot Country Singles & Tracks (Billboard)	19
