= It Ain't Easy (Long John Baldry album) =

Studio album by Long John Baldry
- Released: June 1971
- Recorded: January – February 1971
- Studios: Morgan Studios, London; IBC Studios, London
- Genre: Blues rock
- Length: 37:29
- Label: Warner Music
- Producers: Rod Stewart, Elton John

Long John Baldry chronology
| Wait For Me (1969) | It Ain't Easy (1971) | Everything Stops for Tea (1972) |

Professional ratings
Review scores
| Source | Rating |
|---|---|
| AllMusic | 3.5/5 stars |
| Christgau's Record Guide | C |
| The Vinyl District | A− |

It Ain't Easy is the fifth studio album by British musician Long John Baldry, released in June 1971 on Warner Music. It marked his return to the edgier blues sound that he performed in the mid-1960s. The album was produced jointly by Rod Stewart, who oversaw the first six tracks, and Elton John, who produced the remaining four, with John also contributing piano and organ throughout his sessions. Notable contributors include Ron Wood on guitar and vocalist Maggie Bell. The album contains Baldry's biggest United States hit, "Don't Try to Lay No Boogie-Woogie on the King of Rock and Roll", and reached number 83 on the US Billboard Top LPs chart. It was recorded at Morgan Studios and IBC Studios in London in January and February 1971.

== Background ==
According to extensive notes about Long John Baldry's career in the re-release 2005 CD, Rod Stewart was brought on board to produce It Ain't Easy for Warner Brothers. Shortly thereafter, in 1970, Stewart met Baldry's former Bluesology bandmate Elton John at a party, and the piano player agreed to participate as well. Stewart and John each produced half of this bluesy album, with John contributing much of the piano work. Stewart brought in his associate Ronnie Wood to play guitar as well as many others who would appear on Stewart's Every Picture Tells a Story, released later in 1971.

The Baldry album features his biggest U.S. hit, "Don't Try to Lay No Boogie-Woogie on the King of Rock and Roll"; Baldry once noted how Stewart's late-night recording sessions affected the tracks, "especially those recorded on my thirtieth birthday when he showed up with cases of Remy Martin cognac and several measures of good quality champagne!" Baldry points out that "Don't Try to Lay No Boogie-Woogie on the King of Rock and Roll" was recorded "whilst laying [sic] on the floor".

The 1971 release also features "Black Girl", an American folk song most associated with Lead Belly, though covered by the likes of Bob Dylan, the Grateful Dead, Dolly Parton and Nirvana. Baldry recorded a version featuring Maggie Bell, who also appeared on Every Picture Tells a Story.

It Ain't Easy also includes Willie Dixon's song "I'm Ready" and an Elton John-Bernie Taupin song, "Rock Me When He's Gone".

Baldry and Stewart put a band together to promote the album on Baldry's first tour of the US, consisting of mostly musicians from Stewart's Every Picture Tells a Story album: Sam Mitchell (blues guitar), Micky Waller (drums), Pete Sears (bass) and Ian Armit (piano). They were called "The Long John Baldry Blues Band", and played two tours of the US.

== Track listing ==
1. "Intro: Conditional Discharge" (John Baldry, Ian Armit) – 3:15
2. "Don't Try to Lay No Boogie-Woogie on the King of Rock and Roll" (Jeff Thomas) – 3:26
3. "Black Girl" (Traditional, Lead Belly) – 2:50
4. "It Ain't Easy" (Ron Davies) – 4:52
5. "Morning, Morning" (Tuli Kupferberg) – 2:38
6. "I'm Ready" (Willie Dixon) – 4:15
7. "Let's Burn Down the Cornfield" (Randy Newman) – 4:12
8. "Mr. Rubin" (Lesley Duncan) – 4:00
9. "Rock Me When He's Gone" (Elton John, Bernie Taupin) – 5:01
10. "Flying" (Ronnie Wood, Rod Stewart, Ronnie Lane) – 6:50
- Tracks 1–6 recorded at Morgan Studios; January 15, 17, 27 and 29; February 4, 1971
- Tracks 7–10 recorded at IBC Studios; February 1, 3, 4, 10 and 11, 1971

2005 re-issue bonus tracks:

1. "Goin' Down Slow"
2. "Blues (Corn Bread, Meat and Molasses)"
3. "Love In Vain"
4. "Midnight Hour Blues"
5. "Black Girl" (alternate take)
6. "It Ain't Easy" (alternate take)
7. "I'm Ready" (alternate take)

== Personnel ==
- Long John Baldry – vocals, 12-string guitar (track 3)
- Maggie Bell – vocals (tracks 3, 4)
- Elton John – organ, piano (tracks 7–10)
- Ron Wood – guitar (tracks 2, 4, 6), 12-string guitar (track 5)
- Alan Skidmore – tenor saxophone (track 2)
- Lesley Duncan, Tony Hazzard, Doris Troy, Tony Burrows, Roger Cook, Madeline Bell, Kay Garner, Liza Strike – backing vocals (tracks 2, 9–10)
- Sam Mitchell – dobro, (tracks 3–4) guitar, (tracks 2, 5–6) slide guitar (track 6)
- Ian Armit – piano (tracks 1–6)
- Ricky Brown – bass guitar (tracks 2–6)
- David Glover – bass guitar (tracks 7–10)
- Mick Waller – drums (tracks 2–6)
- Roger Pope – drums (tracks 7–10)
- Caleb Quaye – guitar (tracks 7–10)
- Ray Jackson – mandolin (tracks 3, 5)
- Joshua M'Bopo – guitar (tracks 7–10)
- Madeline Bell – tambourine (track 9)
- Lesley Duncan – chorus caster [choirmistress] (tracks 2, 9–10)

=== Technical ===
- Rod Stewart – producer (tracks 1–6)
- Elton John – producer (tracks 7–10)
- Jimmy Horowitz – executive producer
- Ed Thrasher – art director
- Judith Sims – liner notes

== Charts ==
| Chart (1971) | Peak position |
|---|---|
| US Billboard Top LPs | 83 |

== Certifications ==
| Region | Certification | Certified units/sales |
|---|---|---|
| Canada (Music Canada) | Gold | 50,000^{^} |
^{^} Shipments figures based on certification alone.
