= Blue Heartache =

1973 song performed by Osborne Brothers

Single by Osborne Brothers

from the album Fastest Grass Alive
- B-side: "You're Heavy on My Mind"
- Released: August 1973
- Recorded: May 10, 1972
- Studio: Bradley's Barn, Mt. Juliet, Tennessee
- Genre: Bluegrass
- Label: MCA
- Songwriter: Paul Craft

Osborne Brothers singles chronology
"Tears" (1973)	"Blue Heartache" (1973)	"Fastest Grass Alive" (1973)

"Blue Heartache" is a song written by Paul Craft. It has been recorded by numerous musical artists in several different genres and formats, most notably by the Osborne Brothers in 1973 and Gail Davies in 1979.

== Osborne Brothers version ==
"Blue Heartache" was notably recorded by American Bluegrass group the Osborne Brothers and was released as a single in August 1973 under MCA Records.

"Blue Heartache" was recorded at Bradley's Barn studio in Mount Juliet, Tennessee on May 10, 1973. It was a part of a series of songs recorded for the group's next album entitled Fastest Grass Alive. The song was officially released as a single in August 1973, peaking at number sixty-four on the Billboard Magazine Hot Country Singles chart that year. The single was part of a series of minor hits that the group endured during the early half of the 1970s.

=== Chart performance ===
Chart (1973)	Peak position
US Hot Country Singles (Billboard)	64

== Gail Davies version ==
"Blue Heartache"

Single by Gail Davies

from the album The Game
- B-side: "Everybody's Somebody's Fool"
- Released: October 1979
- Recorded: July 1979; Nashville, Tennessee, U.S.
- Genre: Country
- Label: Warner Bros. Nashville
- Songwriter: Paul Craft
- Producer: Gail Davies

Gail Davies singles chronology
"Someone Is Looking for Someone Like You" (1979)	"Blue Heartache" (1979)	"Like Strangers" (1980)

In October 1979, American country artist Gail Davies recorded and released her version of "Blue Heartache" as a single.

Issued in 1979 as an official single, the song peaked at number seven on the Billboard Magazine Hot Country Singles chart in early 1980. "Blue Heartache" became Davies' first top-ten hit as a musical artist, helping to begin a series of similar successes into the decade. It also became Davies' first entry on the Canadian RPM Country Tracks chart. The song was included on Davies' second studio album entitled The Game (1980).

=== Chart performance ===
Chart (1979–1980)	Peak position
Canada Country Songs (RPM)	49
US Hot Country Singles (Billboard)	7
