= Break Away (Gail Davies song) =

Single by Gail Davies

from the album Where Is a Woman to Go
- B-side: "Not a Day Goes By"
- Released: August 1985
- Recorded: June 1984; Nashville, TN, U.S.
- Label: RCA Nashville
- Songwriter(s): Wayland Holyfield; Gary Nicholson
- Producer(s): Gail Davies; Leland Sklar

Gail Davies singles chronology
"Unwed Fathers" (1985)	"Break Away" (1985)	"Waiting Here for You" (1989)

"Break Away" is a song written by Wayland Holyfield and Gary Nicholson. It was originally recorded and released as a single by American country artist Gail Davies.

"Break Away" was recorded at the "Emerald Sound Studio" in June 1984, which is located in Nashville, Tennessee, United States. Davies recorded her entire sixth studio album (Where Is a Woman to Go) during this session. The session was co-produced by Davies and Leland Sklar. "Break Away" was released as the album's fourth single in August 1985 via RCA Records. The single peaked at number fifteen on the Billboard Hot Country Singles & Tracks chart. The single was Davies' final major hit on the latter chart.

== Chart performance ==
Chart (1985)	Peak position
US Hot Country Singles & Tracks (Billboard)	15
