= Like Strangers =

Single by The Everly Brothers

from the album The Fabulous Style of the Everly Brothers
- B-side: "Brand New Heartache"
- Released: 1960
- Recorded: 1960
- Genre: Pop
- Length: 1:59
- Label: Cadence
- Songwriter: Boudleaux Bryant

The Everly Brothers singles chronology
"So Sad (To Watch Good Love Go Bad)" (1960)	"Like Strangers" (1960)	"Walk Right Back" (1961)

"Like Strangers" is a song written by Boudleaux Bryant, which was a hit single for The Everly Brothers in 1960. The song was later a country hit for Gail Davies in 1980.

== The Everly Brothers version ==
The Everly Brothers released the song on their album The Fabulous Style of the Everly Brothers in spring of 1960, and as a single in autumn of that year. It spent 10 weeks on the Billboard Hot 100 chart, peaking at No. 22, while reaching No. 11 on the United Kingdom's Record Retailer chart, and No. 32 on Canada's CHUM Hit Parade.

=== Chart performance ===
Chart (1960–1961)	Peak position
Canada (CHUM Hit Parade)	32
UK Record Retailer	11
UK New Musical Express	16
US Billboard Hot 100	22
US Cash Box Top 100	25

== Gail Davies version ==
"Like Strangers"

Single by Gail Davies

from the album The Game
- B-side: "Love Is Living Around Us"
- Released: February 1980
- Recorded: 1979
- Genre: Country
- Length: 3:44
- Label: Warner Bros.
- Songwriter: Boudleaux Bryant

Gail Davies singles chronology
"Blue Heartache" (1979)	"Like Strangers" (1980)	"Good Lovin' Man" (1980)

Gail Davies released a cover of the song in 1980 as a single and on the album The Game. Davies' version reached No. 21 on the Billboard "Hot Country Singles" chart, No. 17 on the Record World Country Singles chart, No. 20 on the Cash Box Top 100 Country chart, and No. 52 on Canada's RPM Country 75 Singles chart.
