= It's a Lovely, Lovely World =

1952 song performed by Carl Smith

Single by Carl Smith
- A-side: "Are You Teasing Me"
- Released: March 1952
- Recorded: February 5, 1952; Nashville, Tennessee, US
- Studio: Castle Studio (Nashville, Tennessee)
- Genre: Country
- Label: Columbia
- Songwriter: Boudleaux Bryant
- Producer: Don Law

Carl Smith singles chronology
"Don't Just Stand There" (1952)	""Are You Teasing Me" / "It's a Lovely, Lovely World"" (1952)	"Softly and Tenderly" (1952)

"It's a Lovely, Lovely World" is a song written by Boudleaux Bryant that was originally recorded by American country artist Carl Smith. It has since been recorded by numerous musical artists, including Gail Davies, who revived the song as a single in 1981.

== Carl Smith version ==
"It's a Lovely, Lovely World" was originally composed by Boudleaux Bryant who wrote numerous country recordings during the 1950s and 1960s, including "Bye Bye Love" and "Rocky Top". The song was recorded by Carl Smith on February 5, 1952 in Nashville, Tennessee, United States at the Castle Recording Laboratory. Also included on the session was Smith's future single "Are You Teasing Me". The recording session was produced by Don Law. "It's a Lovely, Lovely World" was released as the B-side to Smith's single "Are You Teasing Me" in March 1952. While the A-side reached number one on the Billboard Magazine Most Played C&W in Juke Boxes list, "It's a Lovely, Lovely World" peaked at number five on the same chart. Originally, both songs were not issued onto official studio albums.

"It's a Lovely, Lovely World" was recorded during the peak of Carl Smith's career as a country music artist. During the early 1950s, along with this song, Smith had thirty top-ten hits amidst the Billboard country singles chart. The song was recorded in Smith's signature Honky Tonk musical style.

=== Chart performance ===
Chart (1952)	Peak position
US Most Played C&W in Juke Boxes (Billboard)	5

== Gail Davies version ==
"It's a Lovely, Lovely World"

Single by Gail Davies

from the album I'll Be There
- B-side: "I'm Hungry, I'm Tired"
- Released: February 1981
- Recorded: April 1980; Hollywood, CA, U.S.
- Genre: Country
- Label: Warner Bros. Nashville
- Songwriter: Boudleaux Bryant
- Producer: Gail Davies

Gail Davies singles chronology
"I'll Be There (If You Ever Want Me)" (1980)	"It's a Lovely, Lovely World" (1981)	"Grandma's Song" (1981)

In 1981, American country artist Gail Davies released a version of "It's a Lovely, Lovely World" as a single. The song was recorded in Hollywood, California, United States at the "Producer's Workshop" studio. The entire recording session for her third studio album I'll Be There took place during this date. The session was produced entirely by Davies.

Released as a single in February 1981 via Warner Bros. Records, "It's a Lovely, Lovely World" reached number five on the Billboard Hot Country Singles chart in mid-1981. The song became Davies' third top-ten Billboard hit and her second highest-charting single during her career. The single also reached a peak of number eleven on the Canadian RPM Country Tracks chart during this same time. The song features background vocals from country artist Emmylou Harris.

=== Chart performance ===
Chart (1981)	Peak position
Canada Country Songs (RPM	11
US Hot Country Singles (Billboard)	5
