= Boys in the Band (album) =

Studio album by Long John Baldry
- Released: 1980
- Recorded: 1974
- Studio: Marquee Studios, London
- Genre: Rock, Blues
- Length: 38:00
- Label: Quality
- Producer: Billy Russell

Long John Baldry chronology
Baldry's Out! (1979)	Boys in the Band (1980)	Long John Baldry (1980)

Boys in the Band is the tenth studio album by British musician Long John Baldry released in late 1980 but recorded in 1974 for ABC Records.

== Background ==
This album was released by Quality Records in Canada to capitalize on the success of Baldry's Out! The material was recorded in the mid −70s, and producer Billy Russell replaced Tom Brown's vocals with Baldry's vocals.(Saxophonist Tom Brown wrote the title track "Boys in the Band" and the lead track "Crazy Lady") More than likely, Baldry agreed to this in an attempt to secure a record deal. The material is album-oriented rock highlighted by the title song and the work of Baldry's guitarist Alan Murphy, who later worked with Kate Bush. Not available on CD.

Although the album was not released until early 1980 two tracks had appeared on a single from ABC records (ABC 4016) in November 1974. LJB released the single under the name – John Baldry Barracuda. The single features "Crazy Lady" as its A-side and "End of Another Day" as the B-side.

Boys in the Band is one of the more obscure Baldry releases that is very rarely seen in discographies. It was made available for digital download in 2010 by Minder Records.

The album was not promoted with a tour and none of the material has ever appeared on live recordings. In 1974 however LJB did record the track "Let’s See What Love Can Do" in a club during a concert that was filmed as part of the documentary – The Gospel According to Long John. This is the only known time anything from Boys in the Band was played live. This may have been due to the fact ABC were set to release the album or more singles and LJB was slowly introducing the material into his repertoire. During a British tour in 1974 many of the tracks were performed along with Baldry's repertoire of classic blues. An album was scheduled to be recorded in Reyjkavik and the band flew with John to Iceland. However, Baldry became ill mainly due to his morbid fear of flying and he returned to London to recover. The band carried on recording without him. The resulting tracks formed the titled Delta Blues album, with vocals contributed by the backing singers The Blues Choir. It was only released in Benelux and copies are rare.

== Track listing ==
1. "Crazy Lady" (Tom Brown) – 4:23
2. "Small Talk'" (George Nash, Michael "Moon" Williams) – 4:13
3. "Boys in the Band" (Tom Brown) – 4:07
4. "Together" (George Nash, Michael "Moon" Williams, Alan Murphy) – 5:55
5. "Let's See What Love Can Do" (George Nash, Alan Murphy) – 3:59
6. "Just a Smile" (George Nash, Michael "Moon" Williams) – 3:07
7. "Taking Time" (George Nash) – 3:43
8. "My Kind of Woman" (Tony Joe White) – 3:36
9. "End of Another Day" (George Nash, Michael "Moon" Williams) – 4:45

== Personnel ==
- Long John Baldry – vocals
- Harry Hughes – drums
- Preston Ross Heyman – drums
- Alan Murphy – guitar
- Michael Finbarr Murphy – guitar
- Sammy "Slide" Mitchell – guitar
- Tom Brown – saxophones, piano, vocals
- Steve Humphries – bass guitar
- George Nash – keyboards

=== Technical ===
- Billy Russell – producer
- John Small – design concept
- Jill Small – artwork
- Mark McKay – graphics
