= I'll Be There (If You Ever Want Me) =

1954 single by Ray Price

Single by Ray Price
- B-side: "Release Me"
- Released: January 1954
- Recorded: December 28, 1953
- Studio: Castle Studio, Nashville
- Genre: Country
- Label: Columbia
- Songwriters: Rusty Gabbard; Ray Price
- Producer: Don Law

Ray Price singles chronology
"Leave Her Alone" (1953)	"I'll Be There (If You Ever Want Me)" (1954)	"I'm Much Too Young to Die" (1954)

"I'll Be There (If You Ever Want Me)"' is a song co-written and originally released as a single by American country artist Ray Price. After becoming a major country hit in 1954, the song has been covered by numerous artists such as Cowboy Copas, Elvis Presley, Connie Smith, Johnny Bush, George Jones and Tammy Wynette, Ronnie Milsap, Heather Myles, Martina McBride, Sam Palladio, Don White & Eric Clapton, Willie Nelson, Nick Lowe, John Fogerty, Gail Davies and J. J. Cale.

== Ray Price version ==
Ray Price co-wrote "I'll Be There (If You Ever Want Me)" with songwriter Rusty Gabbard. The song was professionally recorded on December 28, 1953, at the Castle Studio in Nashville, Tennessee. Also included on the recording session were cover versions of "Release Me" (the eventual B-side to this single) and "The Last Letter". The session was produced by Don Law. Released in January 1954 as a single via Columbia Records, "I'll Be There (If You Ever Want Me)" reached number two on the Billboard Magazine Most Played C&W in Juke Boxes list. Additionally, the song's B-side ("Release Me") reached the top-ten on the same chart. Originally, the song was not issued onto an album.

"I'll Be There (If You Ever Want Me)" was part of a series of songs recorded early in Ray Price's career. It exemplified a musical persona built upon the ideology and musicality of friend/mentor Hank Williams. Price regularly performed the song with Williams' band the Drifting Cowboys in concert. However, despite the song's success (among other hit recordings during that period), Price was dissatisfied that his sound closely resembled Williams. Following 1954, Price spent time re-working his musical image until returning to success in 1956 with "Crazy Arms".

=== Chart performance ===
Chart (1954)	Peak position
US Most Played in C&W in Juke Boxes (Billboard)	2

== Gail Davies version ==
"I'll Be There (If You Ever Want Me)"

Single by Gail Davies

from the album I'll Be There
- B-side: "Farewell Song"
- Released: October 1980
- Recorded: April 1980; Hollywood, CA, U.S.
- Genre: Country
- Label: Warner Bros. Nashville
- Songwriters: Rusty Gabbard; Ray Price
- Producer: Gail Davies

Gail Davies singles chronology
"Good Lovin' Man" (1980)	"I'll Be There (If You Ever Want Me)" (1980)	"It's a Lovely, Lovely World" (1981)

Among other numerous cover versions, American country artist Gail Davies released her version of "I'll Be There (If You Ever Want Me)" as a single in 1980. The song was recorded at the "Producer's Workshop" in Hollywood, California, United States in April 1980. The session was produced entirely by Davies herself. Other songs included on the session included cover versions of "It's a Lovely, Lovely World" and "Honky Tonk Waltz".

"I'll Be There (If You Ever Want Me)" was released as a single via Warner Bros. Records in October 1980. It became a major hit, reaching number four on the Billboard Hot Country Singles chart in early 1981, becoming Davies' highest-charting single on any Billboard chart. "I'll Be There (If You Ever Want Me)" also reached number eight on the Canadian RPM Country Tracks chart in 1981, becoming her highest-charting single on that list also. The song was included on her third studio album entitled, I'll Be There (1981).

Davies said she particularly enjoyed singing this song because of the line, "There ain't no man big enough to stop me." The line is in the original lyrics and has been sung by all male performers of the song, but she felt it acquired a feminist twist when sung by a woman.

=== Chart performance ===
Chart (1980–1981)	Peak position
Canada Country Songs (RPM)	8
US Hot Country Singles (Billboard)	4
