= Long John Baldry =

British and Canadian musician and actor (1941–2005)

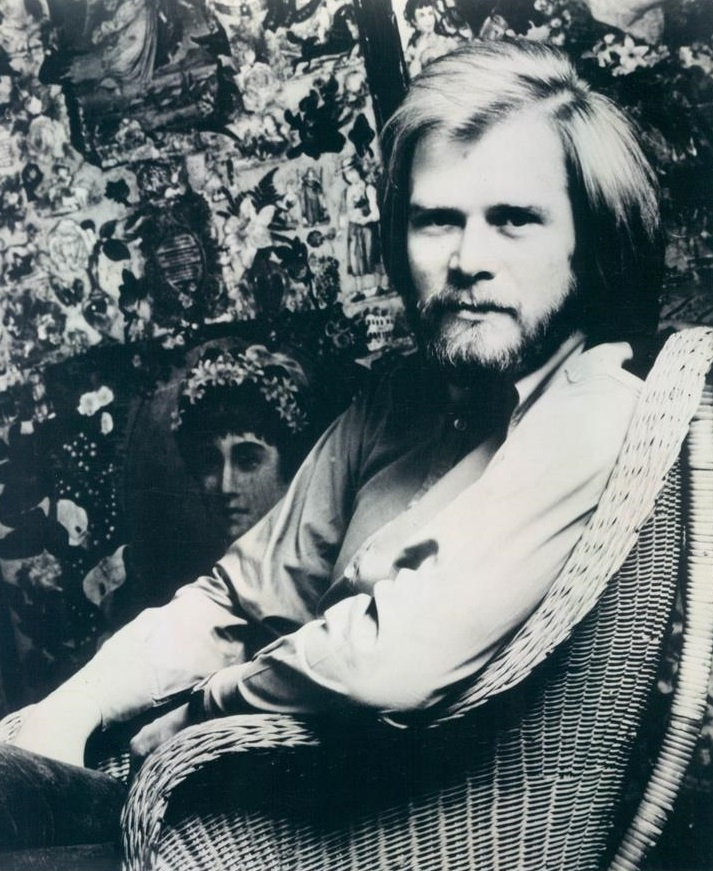
- Baldry in 1972

Background information
- Born: John William Baldry; 12 January 1941; East Haddon, Northamptonshire, England
- Died: 21 July 2005 (aged 64) Vancouver, British Columbia, Canada
- Genres: Blues; blues rock; folk rock
- Occupations: Musician; singer; actor
- Instruments: Vocals; guitar
- Years active: 1957–2004
- Labels: Decca; United Artists; Pye; Warner; GM; ABC; Casablanca; Atlantic; EMI; Music Line; Stony Plain; Hypertension

John William "Long John" Baldry (12 January 1941 – 21 July 2005) was a British and Canadian musician and actor. In the 1960s, he was one of the first British vocalists to sing the blues in clubs and shared the stage with many British musicians including the Rolling Stones, the Animals and the Beatles. Before achieving stardom, Rod Stewart and Elton John were members of bands led by Baldry. He enjoyed pop success in 1967 when "Let the Heartaches Begin" reached No. 1 in the UK, and in Australia where his duet with the American singer Kathi McDonald, a cover of the Righteous Brothers' "You've Lost That Lovin' Feelin'", reached No. 2 in 1980.

Baldry lived in Canada from the late-1970s onward, and continued to make records there. Beginning in the mid-1980s, he took up voiceover work, most notably as Doctor Ivo Robotnik in Adventures of Sonic the Hedgehog.

== Early life ==
John William Baldry was born on 12 January 1941, at East Haddon Hall, East Haddon, Northamptonshire, which was serving as a makeshift wartime maternity ward. He was the son of William James Baldry (1915–1990), a Metropolitan Police constable and his wife, Margaret Louisa (née Parker; 1915–1989); their usual address was recorded as 18 Frinton Road, East Ham. His early life was spent in Edgware, Middlesex, where he attended Camrose Primary School until the age of 11, after which he attended Downer Grammar School (now Canons High School).

== Blues bands of the 1960s ==
Baldry grew to 6 ft 7 in (2.01 m), resulting in the nickname "Long John". He appeared quite regularly in the early 1960s in the Gyre & Gimble coffee lounge, around the corner from Charing Cross railway station, and at the Bluesville R. & B. Club, Manor House, London, also Klooks Kleek (Railway Hotel, West Hampstead). He appeared weekly for some years at Eel Pie Island on the Thames at Twickenham and also appeared at the Station Hotel in Richmond, one of the Rolling Stones' earliest venues.

In the early 1960s, he sang with Alexis Korner's Blues Incorporated, with whom he recorded the first British blues album in 1962, R&B from the Marquee. At stages, Mick Jagger, Jack Bruce and Charlie Watts were members of this band while Keith Richards and Brian Jones played on stage, although none played on the R&B at the Marquee album. When the Rolling Stones made their debut at the Marquee Club in July 1962, Baldry put together a group to support them. Later, he was the announcer introducing the Stones on their United States-only live album Got Live If You Want It! in 1966.

Baldry became friendly with Paul McCartney after a show at the Cavern Club in Liverpool in the early 1960s, leading to an invitation to sing on one of the Beatles' 1964 television specials, Around the Beatles. In the special, Baldry performs "Got My Mojo Workin'" and a medley of songs with members of the Vernons Girls trio; in the latter, the Beatles are shown singing along in the audience.

In 1963, Baldry joined the Cyril Davies R&B All Stars with Nicky Hopkins playing piano. He took over in 1964 after the death of Cyril Davies, and the group became Long John Baldry and his Hoochie Coochie Men featuring Rod Stewart on vocals and Geoff Bradford on guitar. Stewart was recruited when Baldry heard him busking a Muddy Waters song at Twickenham Station after Stewart had been to a Baldry gig at Eel Pie Island. Long John Baldry became a regular fixture on Sunday nights at Eel Pie Island from then onwards, fronting a series of bands.

In 1965, the Hoochie Coochie Men became Steampacket, with Baldry and Stewart as male vocalists, Julie Driscoll as the female vocalist, and Brian Auger on Hammond organ. After Steampacket broke up in 1966, Baldry formed Bluesology, featuring Reg Dwight on keyboards and Elton Dean, later of Soft Machine, as well as Caleb Quaye on guitar. When Dwight began to record as a solo artist, he adopted the name Elton John, his first name from Elton Dean and his surname from John Baldry.

Following the departure of Elton John and Bluesology, Baldry was left without a backup band. Attending a show in the Mecca at Shaftesbury Avenue, he saw a five-piece harmony group from Plymouth called Chimera, who had recently turned professional. He approached them after their set to tell them how impressed he was by their vocal harmonies and that they would be ideal to back him on the cabaret circuit he was currently embarking on, which they did.

== Solo artist ==
In 1967, he recorded a pop song "Let the Heartaches Begin" that went to number one in Britain, followed by a 1968 top 20 hit titled "Mexico", which was the theme of the UK Olympic team that year. "Let the Heartaches Begin" made the lower reaches of the Billboard Hot 100 in the US. Baldry was still touring, doing gigs with Bluesology, but the band refused to back his rendition of "Let the Heartaches Begin", and left the stage while he performed to a backing-tape played on a large Revox tape-recorder.

In 1971, John and Stewart each produced one side of It Ain't Easy which became Baldry's most popular album and made the top 100 of the US album chart. The album featured "Don't Try to Lay No Boogie Woogie on the King of Rock and Roll" which became his most successful song in the US. Baldry's first tour of the US was at this time. The band included Micky Waller, Ian Armitt, Pete Sears, and Sammy Mitchell. Stewart and John would again co-produce his 1972 album Everything Stops For Tea which also made the lower reaches of the US album charts. The same year, Baldry worked with ex-Procol Harum guitarist Dave Ball. The 1979 album Baldry's Out was recorded in Canada, which he released at Zolly's Forum; a nightclub in Oshawa, underneath the Oshawa Shopping Centre.

In a 1997 interview with a German television programme, Baldry claimed to be the last person to see singer Marc Bolan before Bolan's death on 16 September 1977, having conducted an interview with the fellow singer for an American production company, he says, just before Bolan was killed in a car accident.

== Move to Canada, later career ==
After time in New York City and Los Angeles in 1978, Baldry lived in Dundas, Ontario from 1980 to 1984 before settling in Vancouver, British Columbia, where he became a Canadian citizen. He toured the west and east coasts as well as the United States northwest.

In 1976, he teamed with the American singer Kathi McDonald, who became part of the Long John Baldry Band, touring Canada and the United States. In 1979 the pair recorded a version of the Righteous Brothers' "You've Lost That Lovin' Feelin'" (of which Baldry previously covered solo in 1966), following which McDonald became part of his touring group for two decades. The song entered the United States Billboard charts and was a No. 2 hit in Australia in 1980. "(Walk Me Out In the) Morning Dew", a song from his 1980 Boys in the Band album, became a hit in the Netherlands in 1981.

He last recorded with the Stony Plain label. His 1997 album Right To Sing The Blues won a Juno Award in the Blues Album of the Year category at the Juno Awards of 1997.

In 2003, Baldry headlined the British Legends of Rhythm and Blues United Kingdom tour, alongside Zoot Money, Ray Dorset and Paul Williams. Baldry's final United States performance was held at Barrister Hall in Columbus, Ohio, on 19 July 2004. Baldry's final United Kingdom tour as the Long John Baldry Trio concluded with a performance on 13 November 2004 at The King's Lynn Arts Centre, King's Lynn, Norfolk, England. The trio consisted of Baldry, Butch Coulter on harmonica and Dave Kelly on slide guitar.

== Personal life ==
According to Giorgio Gomelsky, Baldry's flamboyant mannerisms made his homosexuality an open secret within the music industry during the early 1960s; until 1967, male homosexual acts were unlawful in England and Wales, and so Baldry did not publicly disclose his orientation. Baldry had a brief relationship with Dave Davies of the Kinks.

In 1968, Elton John tried to take his own life after relationship problems with a woman, Linda Woodrow. His lyricist Bernie Taupin and Baldry found him, and Baldry talked him out of marrying her. The song "Someone Saved My Life Tonight" from Captain Fantastic and the Brown Dirt Cowboy was about the experience.

In 1978, Baldry's then-upcoming album Baldry's Out announced his formal coming out, and he addressed sexuality problems with a cover of Canadian songwriter Barbra Amesbury's "A Thrill's a Thrill".

=== Health and death ===
During the mid-1970s, Baldry suffered from depression exacerbated by his collapsing career (particularly the failure of his 1973 album Good to Be Alive) and separation from an Austrian boyfriend who was required to leave the United Kingdom when his visitor visa expired. As a result, he developed an addiction to alcohol and painkillers.

Following an incident in which he was allegedly mugged in Amsterdam, Baldry was found barely conscious by his sister, Margaret, in their Muswell Hill home, having overdosed on Valium and alcohol in an apparent suicide attempt. Baldry was institutionalised for less than a week, reportedly stopping his dependencies cold turkey.

By the release of his 1986 album Silent Treatment, Baldry suffered from crippling gout – which required several pairs of special shoes – as well as bronchial and sinus issues. Shortly after moving into a condominium on Vancouver's 4th Avenue in 1995, Baldry was hospitalised and underwent surgery for a bleeding stomach ulcer. He quit smoking afterwards and ceased performing in clubs that allowed smoking. During a performance in Banbury promoting his 1999 live album Live, Long John Baldry Trio, Baldry was hospitalised for another bleeding ulcer caused and obscured by his arthritis medication indometacin. A few days after being discharged from Horton General Hospital, he developed agonising gout across his body, prompting Rod Stewart to admit him to the London Clinic, where he stayed for three weeks.

In 2002, Baldry remarked that he had developed spinal osteoporosis and dorsocervical lipodystrophy. He underwent hip replacement surgery to treat his osteoporosis, after which Tom Lavin of the Powder Blues Band noted that he appeared healthier.

Although he had ceased smoking, Baldry developed a persistent hacking cough and chronic wheezing by late 2004; according to Felix "Oz" Rexach, Baldry's partner of 25 years, he had fallen ill with pneumonia after returning from a European tour earlier that year. Baldry held a phobia of hospitals, fearing that he would "never come out", and so resisted Rexach's attempts to get him medical attention. After becoming too ill to endure, he was finally admitted to a hospital in March 2005, and was moved to a rehabilitation clinic two weeks later, where Rod Stewart visited him. In early April, his condition deteriorated and he was moved to an intensive care unit, where he was fitted with a tracheotomy. Despite weeks of exploratory operations on Baldry's lung, the prognosis was grim; his doctor believed that he was unlikely to survive, and even if he did, he would likely not be able to perform again due to the damage to his lungs. On 1 July, Baldry's condition was deemed beyond treatment, as he had contracted MRSA due to his depleted immune system. Baldry's personal friend and unofficial archivist, Jeff Edmunds, selected Sister Rosetta Tharpe's "Up Above My Head" as the last song Baldry listened to. Surrounded by friends, family, and loved ones, Baldry was pronounced dead at 10:30 pm on 21 July 2005 at Vancouver General Hospital at the age of 64. The cause of death was listed as a severe chest infection. He was survived by Rexach, his brother Roger, and his sister Margaret.

== Discography ==
=== Studio albums ===
Year	Title	Peak chart positions	Label	Cat. No.
Year	Title	US 200	Label	Cat. No.
1964	Long John's Blues	—	United Artists	ULP 1081
1966	Looking at Long John	—	United Artists	ULP 1146
1968	Let the Heartaches Begin	—	Pye Records	NPL 18208
1969	Wait for Me	—	Pye Records	NSPL 18366
1971	It Ain't Easy	83	Warner Bros.	WS 1921
1972	Everything Stops for Tea	180	Warner Bros.	BS 2614
1973	Good to Be Alive	—	GM Records	GML 1005
1976	Welcome to Club Casablanca	—	Casablanca Records	NBLP 7035-V
1979	Baldry's Out!	—	EMI Capitol	ST 6459
1980	Boys in the Band	—	Quality Records	SV 2068
1980	Long John Baldry	—	EMI Capitol	SW 17038
1982	Rock With the Best	—	EMI Capitol	ST 6490
1986	Silent Treatment	—	Musicline Records	ML 000l
1991	It Still Ain't Easy	—	Stony Plain Records / Hypertension-Music	SPCD 1163 / HYCD 200 122
1996	Right to Sing the Blues	—	Stony Plain Records / Hypertension-Music	SPCD 1232 / HYCD 296 167
2001	Remembering Leadbelly	—	Stony Plain Records	SPCD 1275

=== Live albums ===
Year	Title	Label	Cat. No.
1986	Long John Baldry & Friends	Musicline Records	ML 0002
1987	This Is Japan (Diamond Club, Toronto 6 September 1987)	Musicline Records	Unreleased
1989	A Touch of the Blues	Musicline Records	ML 0005
1993	On Stage Tonight - Baldry's Out!	Stony Plain Records / Hypertension-Music	SPCD 1192 / HYCD 200 135
1999	Evening Conversation	Stony Plain Records / Hypertension-Music	SPCD 1268 / HYP 0191
2009	Live - Iowa State University	Angel Air Records	SJPCD310

=== Compilations ===
Year	Title	Label	Cat. No.
1982	The Best of Long John Baldry	EMI Capitol	SN 66124
1995	A Thrill's A Thrill: The Canadian Years	EMI	S22Z 29609
1998	Let the Heartaches Begin: The Pye Anthology	Sequel Records	42298
2005	Boogie Woogie: The Warner Bros. Recordings	Rhino Handmade	RHM2 7896
2006	Looking at Long John Baldry: The UA Years 1964-1966	EMI	0946 3 50899 2
2014	The Best of the Stony Plain Years	Stony Plain Records	SPCD 1376

=== Singles ===
Year	A-Side	B-Side	Label	Cat. No.
1964	"You'll Be Mine"	"Up Above My Head"	United Artists	UP 1056
1964	"I'm on to You Baby"	"Goodbye Baby"	United Artists	UP 1078
1965	"How Long Will It Last?"	"House Next Door"	United Artists	UP 1107
1966	"Unseen Hands"	"Turn on Your Love Light"	United Artists	UP 1124
1966	"The Drifter"	"Only a Fool Breaks His Own Heart"	United Artists	UP 1136
1966	"Cuckoo"	"Bring My Baby Back to Me"	United Artists	UP 1158
1967	"Only a Fool Breaks His Own Heart"	"Let Him Go (And Let Me Love You)"	United Artists	UP 1204
1967	"Let the Heartaches Begin"	"Annabella"	Pye Records	7N 17385
1967	"Let the Heartaches Begin"	"Hey Lord You Made the Night Too Long"	Pye Records	7N 17408
1968	"Hold Back the Daybreak"	"Since I Lost You Baby"	Pye Records	7N 17455
1968	"When the Sun Comes Shining Thru"	"Wise to the Ways of the World"	Pye Records	7N 17593
1968	"Mexico"	"We're Together"	Pye Records	7N 17563
1969	"It's Too Late Now"	"The Long and Lonely Nights"	Pye Records	7N 17664
1969	"Wait for Me"	"Don't Pity Me"	Pye Records	7N 17815
1970	"Well I Did"	"Setting Fire to the Tail of a Fox"	Pye Records	7N 17921
1970	"When the War Is Over"	"Where Are My Eyes?"	Pye Records	7N 45007
1971	"Rock Me When He's Gone"	"Flying"	Warner Bros.	K 16105
1971	"Don't Try to Lay No Boogie Woogie on the King of Rock and Roll"	"Black Girl"	Warner Bros.	GS 45105
1971	"Don't Try to Lay No Boogie Woogie on the King of Rock and Roll"	"Mr. Rubin"	Warner Bros.	WB.16099
1972	"Iko Iko"	"Mother Ain't Dead"	Warner Bros.	K 16175
1972	"Everything Stops for Tea"	"Hambone"	Warner Bros.	K 16217
1972	"Mother Ain't Dead"	"You Can't Judge a Book by the Cover"	Warner Bros.	WB 7617
1973	"She"	"Song for Martin Luther King"	GM Records	GMS 9005
1974	"Crazy Lady"	"End of Another Day"	ABC Records	ABC 4016
1975	"Let Me Pass"	"High and Low"	Casablanca Records	Casablanca 600
1976	"This Boy's in Love Again"	"Song for Martin Luther King"	GM Records	GMS 9043
1977	"On Broadway"	"On Broadway (instrumental)"	GM Records	GMS 9045
1977	"Don't Try to Lay No Boogie Woogie on the King of Rock and Roll"	"Tell Me Something I Don't Know"	Atlantic Records	CATX 40011
1979	"You've Lost That Lovin' Feelin'"	"Baldry's Out"	EMI Capitol	006-86113
1979	"A Thrill's a Thrill"	"Baldry's Out"	EMI Capitol	EA 103
1979	"A Thrill's a Thrill"	"Find You"	EMI Capitol	1A 006-860571979
1979	"Come and Get Your Love"	"Lonely Nights"	EMI Capitol	72808 1979
1980	"(Walk Me Out in The) Morning Dew"	"I Want You, I Love You"	EMI Capitol	006-86329
1980	"Any Day Now"	"Work for Me"	EMI Capitol	72841
1981	"Too Late for Crying"	"25 Years of Pain"	EMI Capitol	72874
1982	"Stay the Way You Are"	"Midnight Show"	EMI Capitol	72878
1985	"The Sun Ain't Gonna Shine (Anymore)"	"Mystery to Me"	Line Records	LS 1.00005
1986	"Silent Treatment"	"Our Love Is in Limbo"	Musicline Records	MLS 002
1986	"The Sun Ain't Gonna Shine Anymore"	"Carnival"	Musicline Records	MLS 003
1986	"Ain't That Peculiar"	"Spoonful"	Musicline Records	MLS 004
1987	"This Is Japan"	"When the World Doesn't Love You"	Musicline Records	MLS 005
1987	"Silent Treatment"	"A Life of Blues"	Pläne Records	B-4791

=== EPs ===
Year	Title	Tracks	Label	Cat. No.
1965	Long John's Blues	"Dimples" / "Hoochie Coochie Man" / "My Baby" / "Times Are Getting Tougher Than Tough"	United Artists	UEP 1013
1967	Cuckoo	"Cuckoo" / "You've Lost That Lovin' Feelin'" / "Stop Her on Sight (S.O.S.)" / "Bring My Baby Back to Me"	United Artists	UEP 36.108
1992	Midnight in New Orleans	"Midnight in New Orleans" / "Introduction" / "Good Morning Blues" / "As Long as I Feel the Spirit" / "Black Girl" / "Ain't the Peculiar"	Hypertension Music	HYCDS 100 103
1995	...Some Thrills	EMI	DRPO 1132	Five track promo with a previously unreleased version of "Passing Glanes"
2018	Filthy McNasty	"Filthy McNasty" / "Backwater Blues" / "St. James Infirmary" / "Money's Getting Cheaper"	Rhythm & Blues Records	REP21

=== Other recordings ===
Year	Title	Notes
1959	Gallows Pole	Unissued Schott Music Corp. demo.
1965	Mister Someone	From the ITV television play The End of Arthur's Marriage
1968	Let There Be Long John	Pye Records; Unreleased album
1970	Madame	Unissued ATV-Kirshner / Pye demo.
1981	Ken's Theme	Recorded for the documentary film The Devil at Your Heels
1984	Run Through the Jungle	Unissued single that received some radio play.
1987	The Luckiest Man Alive	Self-penned opening song to the comedy Home Is Where The Hart Is
2004	Baldry's Back	Stony Plain Records; Unreleased album
2004	Baldry's Back	Self-penned title track from the unissued album 'Baldry's Back'
2004	Marriage Meltdown	Self-penned track from the unissued album 'Baldry's Back'
2004	I Ain't Superstitious	Track from the unissued album 'Baldry's Back'
2004	Baby Please Don't Go	Track from the unissued album 'Baldry's Back'

Performances on other albums

- (1960) 6 Out Of 4 ~ The Thames-Side Four - Folklore (F-EP/1) 'Live recording of the group with LJB on guitar and vocals.'
- (1962) R&B from the Marquee ~ Blues Incorporated - Decca (ACL 1130) 'Baldry provides lead vocals on three tracks including "How Long, How Long Blues".'
- (1970) The First Supergroup ~ The Steampacket - BYG Records (529.706) 'Recorded December 1965 the album features tracks with LJB on lead vocals'
- (1971) The First Rhythm & Blues Festival in England ~ Various Artists - BYG Records (529.705) 'Recorded live in February 1964; Baldy sings "2.19" and "Mojo Working"'
- (1971) Every Picture Tells a Story ~ Rod Stewart - Mercury (6338 063) 'LJB provides backing vocals on the title track and "Seems Like A Long Time".'
- (1972) Mar Y Sol: The First International Puerto Rico Pop Festival ~ Various Artists - Atco Records (SD 2-705) 'Baldry sings a live version of the self-penned "Bring My Baby Back To Me".'
- (1975) Dick Deadeye: Original Soundtrack ~ Various Artists - GM Records (GML 1018) 'Soundtrack to the animated film of the same name with LJB taking lead vocals on three tracks.'
- (1975) Sumar Á Sýrlandi ~ Stuðmenn - Egg (EGG 0000 1/13) 'Rare Icelandic album. Baldry sings the track "She Broke My Heart".'
- (1996) Bone, Bottle, Brass or Steel ~ Doug Cox - Malahat Mountain 'LJB performs "Good Morning Blues" accompanied by Doug Cox.'
- (1998) You Got The Bread... We Got The Jam! ~ Schuld & Stamer - Blue Streak Records (BSCD98001) 'Long John joins with acoustic blues duo Schuld & Stamer on several tracks.'
- (2002) For Fans Only! ~ Genya Ravan - AHA Music 'Features a rare duet with Ravan and Baldry on "Something's Got A Hold On Me". Recorded in 1978.'
- (2011) The Definitive Steampacket Recordings ~ The Steampacket - Nasty Productions 'Features two previously unreleased Steampacket tracks with LJB on lead vocals.'
- (2013) Radio Luxembourg Sessions: 208 Rhythm Club - Vol. 5 ~ Various Artists - Vocalion (CDNJT 5319) 'October 1961 recording. LJB sings "Every Day I Have The Blues".'
- (2013) Radio Luxembourg Sessions: 208 Rhythm Club - Vol. 6 ~ Various Artists - Vocalion (CDNJT 5320) 'October 1961 recording of LJB singing "The Glory of Love".'

TV specials

- (1965) Rod The Mod
- (1974) The Gospel According To Long John
- (1985) Long John Baldry: Rockin' The Blues
- (1987) Long John Baldry At The Maintenance Shop
- (1993) Long John Baldry In Concert
- (1993) Leverkusen Blues Festival '93: The Long John Baldry Band
- (1993) Waterfront Blues Festival: Long John Baldry
- (1997) Leverkusen Blues Festival '97: Long John Baldry & Tony Ashton
- (1998) Café Campus Blues with Long John Baldry
- (2001) Happy Birthday Blues: Long John Baldry & Friends
- (2007) Long John Baldry: In The Shadow Of The Blues

== Filmography ==
=== Film ===
Year	Title	Role	Notes
1971	Up the Chastity Belt	Little John	
1975	Dick Deadeye, or Duty Done	The Major General, Monarch of the Sea (voices)	
1990	Angel Square	Radio Announcer	
1995	Blame It on the Blues	Bartender	
1998	Camelot: The Legend	Merlin (voice)	
2002	Snow Queen	Rutger The Reindeer (voice)	
2003	Ben Hur	Balthazar (voice)	
2004	Mary Engelbreit's The Night Before Christmas	Augustus (voice)	Short; Final performance

=== Television ===
Year	Title	Role	Notes
1968	Bobbie Gentry BBC Series	Himself	1 episode
1985	Star Wars: Droids	Proto One, The Great Heep (voice)	1 episode + 1 special
1989–1991	Captain N: The Game Master	King Charles, Little John, Clock Man, The Poltergeist King (voices)	5 episodes
1989	Dragon Warrior	Narrator (voice)	13 episodes
1990	The New Adventures of He-Man	Treylus (voice)	Uncredited, 1 episode
1990	A Klondike Christmas	Bear-Paw (voice)	Television special
1991–1992	Captain Zed and the Zee Zone	Captain Spring (voice)	2 episodes
1991	MacGyver	Man No. 2	Episode: "Strictly Business"
1991	Bucky O'Hare and the Toad Wars!	KOMPLEX (voice)	13 episodes
1991	Nilus the Sandman: The Boy Who Dreamed Christmas	Nilus the Sandman (voice)	Television special
1992	The Flying Stones of Nan Madol	Narrator (voice)	TV documentary
1993	Adventures of Sonic the Hedgehog	Dr. Ivo Robotnik (voice)	65 episodes
1993	Jack's Place	Tall Man	Episode: "Something Wonderful This Way Comes"
1993	Madeline	Greybeard the Pirate (voice)	1 episode
1994–1996	Hurricanes	Stan (voice)	1 episode
1994–1997	ReBoot	Captain Capacitor, Old Man Pearson (voices)	11 episodes
1994	Nilus the Sandman: Monsters in the Closet	Nilus the Sandman (voice)	Television film
1995	Nilus the Sandman: The First Day	Nilus the Sandman (voice)	Television special
1996–1997	The Adventures of Corduroy	Mr. Tusk (voice)	4 episodes
1996–1998	Nilus the Sandman	Nilus the Sandman (voice)	26 episodes
1996	Sonic's Christmas Blast	Dr. Ivo Robotnik, Swat-Bot (voices)	Television special
1998	Pocket Dragon Adventures	King Bigoty (voice)	1 episode
1998	Fat Dog Mendoza	Golden Volcano God (voice)	Episode: "Going the Distance"
1998–1999	RoboCop: Alpha Commando	The Premier (voice)	2 episodes
1999	Sabrina: The Animated Series	Captain Jean Lafitte (voice)	1 episode
2002	The New Beachcombers	Member of JJ's Jugband	Television special
2002–2003	Toad Patrol	Mistle-Toad (voice)	26 episodes

=== Video games ===
Year	Title	Role	Notes
1992	Bucky O'Hare: The Arcade Game	KOMPLEX	

== Theatre ==
Year	Title	Role	Notes
1973	The Big Rock Candy Mountain	The Cowboy aka Narrator	
1986	Traps		Play at the Edmonton Fringe Festival.
1988	Peter Pan: The Musical	Captain Hook	
