= Russell B Jackson =

American musician

Russell Bernard Jackson is an American upright and electric bass player.

Jackson was born in Memphis, Tennessee. He started his career as a bass player with Otis Clay in Chicago.

He then landed a job with B. B. King. He toured internationally with King and his orchestra for six and a half years.

Jackson then attended the Dick Grove School of Music in Los Angeles.

During the course of his career Jackson played with many bands, including percussion project Silent Partners, and musicians Buddy Guy, Matt "Guitar" Murphy, Willie Nelson, Kenny Wayne, Marshall Lawrence and Sunny Fournier. For a number of years Jackson fronted the Russell Jackson Band, based in Vancouver, British Columbia. He also toured extensively with James "Buddy" Rogers.
