= Someone Is Looking for Someone Like You =

Single by Gail Davies

from the album Gail Davies
- B-side: "Soft Spoken"
- Released: January 1979
- Recorded: August 1978; Nashville, Tennessee, U.S.
- Label: Lifesong
- Songwriter: Gail Davies
- Producer: Tommy West

Gail Davies singles chronology
"Poison Love" (1978)	"Someone Is Looking for Someone Like You" (1979)	"Blue Heartache" (1979)

"Someone Is Looking for Someone Like You" is a song written and recorded by American country artist Gail Davies. The song was released as a single in January 1979 on Lifesong Records.

"Someone Is Looking for Someone Like You" was recorded at the Sound Stage Studio in Nashville, Tennessee, United States in August 1978. The song was issued as a single in January 1979, reaching number eleven on the Billboard Magazine Hot Country Singles chart. The song was the third single released from her self-titled studio album. It became Davies' first major hit as a musical artist, helping to establish her career as a country music performer throughout the 1980s.

== Chart performance ==
Chart (1979)	Peak position
US Hot Country Singles (Billboard)	11
