= Gail Davies =

American singer-songwriter (born 1948)

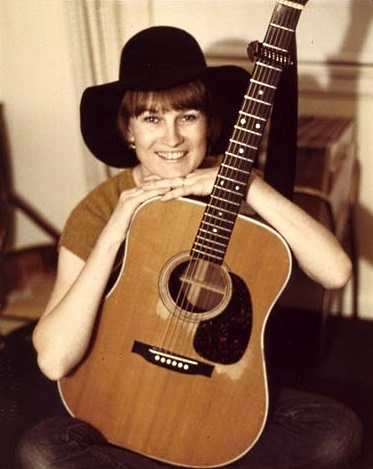
- Davies in 1977

Background information
- Born: Patricia Gail Dickerson; June 5, 1948 (age 78)
- Origin: Broken Bow, Oklahoma, United States
- Genres: Country; folk
- Occupations: Singer-songwriter; record producer
- Instruments: Vocals; guitar
- Years active: 1978–present
- Labels: Lifesong; Warner Bros.; RCA; MCA; Capitol; Little Chickadee
- Formerly of: Wild Choir
- Website: Gail Davies official website

Gail Davies (born Patricia Gail Dickerson; June 5, 1948) is an American singer-songwriter and one of the first females in country music to produce her own albums. She is the daughter of country singer Tex Dickerson and the sister of songwriter Ron Davies.

Gail Davies established herself as a successful singer and songwriter during the 1970s and 1980s, scoring numerous top-10 and -20 Billboard hits. She was one of country music's most influential artists, becoming one of the genre's first females to solely produce her own records. She has been cited as a role model for other female singers, including Suzy Bogguss, Kathy Mattea, Mary Chapin Carpenter, and Pam Tillis.

== Early life and career ==
Gail Davies was born in Broken Bow, Oklahoma, United States. on June 5, 1948. Her father was a popular country singer in the 1940s, performing in and around the Texas/Oklahoma region and occasionally appearing on The Louisiana Hayride. Although born in the South, Gail grew up in Washington, where her mother remarried. Gail's last name was changed when she and her two brothers were adopted by their stepfather, Darby Davies. After graduating from high school, Gail moved to Los Angeles and married a jazz musician. She briefly sang jazz, but quit after they divorced. She was later hired as a session singer at A&M Records, working with such iconic artists as Neil Young, Hoyt Axton, and Glen Campbell. She was able to sit in on a John Lennon session, produced by Phil Spector, and was befriended by songwriter Joni Mitchell. (Gail would later have a country hit single on a song of Joni Mitchells' entitled "You Turn Me On I'm A Radio.") It was Mitchell's recording engineer, Henry Lewy, who taught Gail how to produce records. She was invited to tour Europe with Frank Zappa, but turned the offer down to work with country artist Roger Miller, making her television debut as his singing partner on The Merv Griffin Show.

Encouraged by her older brother, Ron Davies, (who is best known for having written "It Ain't Easy" for David Bowie and "Long Hard Climb" for Helen Reddy), Gail soon began writing songs. She moved to Nashville, Tennessee, in 1976 and signed with EMI Publishing as a staff songwriter. One of her earliest compositions, "Bucket to the South", became a hit for Ava Barber. It was also recorded by Lynn Anderson and Mitzi Gaynor, and became a standard on the Grand Ole Opry for country singer Wilma Lee Cooper. However, Davies was determined to prove she was a singer, herself. She signed with CBS/Lifesong Records in 1978 and released a self-titled album that scored three top-20 hit singles. Another of her original compositions, an introspective song entitled "Someone Is Looking for Someone Like You", was the album's highest-charting single, reaching number seven in Cashbox and number 11 on the Billboard chart. This song has since been translated into seven languages and recorded by such internationally known artists as Nana Mouskouri, Susan McCann, Iona and Andy, George Hamilton IV, and bluegrass legends The Country Gentlemen.

== Height of her career ==
Unhappy with the production of her first album, Gail switched to Warner Bros. Records in 1979 and became one of the first female artists in country music to produce her own records (Cordell Jackson preceded her in the 1950's). Her album The Game was even more successful than her previous record had been. It featured a top-10 single entitled "Blue Heartache", as well as two top-20 hits, "Like Strangers" and another of her own compositions entitled "Good Lovin' Man". Gail went on to produce "I'll Be There" in 1980, which spawned three more top-10 Billboard hit singles. The title track, "I'll Be There (If You Ever Want Me)" went to number four on the charts, followed by "It's a Lovely, Lovely World" (with harmony vocals by Emmylou Harris), and another, which Davies wrote for her maternal grandmother, "Grandma's Song". Davies was nominated for ACMA and CMA awards in 1981 and voted "Best New Female Vocalist" by the DJs of America.

By 1982, Davies was not slowing down. She released her third self-produced album Giving Herself Away. This record brought another top-10 hit, written by Rory Bourke and K.T. Oslin, entitled "Round the Clock Lovin'". Her career took a short hiatus in the winter of 1982, when she gave birth to her only child, Christopher Scruggs, who is also the son of songwriter Gary Scruggs and the grandson of bluegrass musician Earl Scruggs.

Warner Bros. Records released her last album for the label, What Can I Say, in 1983. Although some sizable hits came from this album, including two top-20 singles – "You're a Hard Dog (To Keep Under the Porch)" and a self-penned song entitled "Boys like You," – her chart success was beginning to wane. The last single from this album, a duet with Ricky Skaggs written by Gail's brother, Ron Davies, was entitled "It's You Alone." It was released just as Davies was preparing to leave Warner Bros. Records. With no promotional support from the label, it stalled at number 55 on the Billboard chart.

Gail signed with RCA Records in 1984 and released Where Is a Woman to Go. Produced by Gail and James Taylor's bass player, Leland Sklar, this album featured two more hit singles – "Breakaway", which went to number 15 on the charts and "Jagged Edge of a Broken Heart," climbing to number 20. The last single from this album, a duet with Dolly Parton entitled "Unwed Fathers," was said to be too controversial for country radio. Written by John Prine and Bobby Braddock, this song barely made it into the Billboard top 50.

Inspired by a trip to England in 1985, Gail formed a country/rock band called Wild Choir. They released one self-titled album on RCA Records and three Billboard singles – "Heart to Heart", "Safe in the Arms of Love", and "Next Time", written by Davies, Pam Rose, and Mary Ann Kennedy.

In 1989, Davies signed with MCA Records and produced an album of 10 self-penned compositions entitled Pretty Words. The album garnered two more top-50 singles, "Waiting Here for You" and "Hearts in the Wind". The song that the record company chose not to release, written by Davies and Harry Stinson, was entitled "Tell Me Why." It went on to become a hit for Curb recording artist Jann Browne. Browne would later record another of Gail's original compositions, "Better Love Next Time," co-written with Paul Kennerley.

Gail moved to Capitol Records in 1989 and released two albums – The Other Side of Love and The Best of Gail Davies. Hired by Capitol/EMI in 1990 to become Nashville's first female staff producer, Davies spent four years working with young artists such as Mandy Barnett before starting her own record label, Little Chickadee Productions (LCP). She produced and released an album in 1995 entitled Eclectic, which was chosen by The New York Times as one of the "Ten Best Country Albums of the Year." Other LCP releases include Gail Davies' Greatest Hits, Love Ain't Easy, Live At The Station Inn, The Songwriter Sessions, Since I Don't Have You (featuring jazz legend Benny Golson), and Beyond the Realm of Words produced by Davies and her son, Chris Scruggs.

== Later career and life today ==
Davies received an International Bluegrass Music Award, along with a Grammy Award nomination, for her duet with Ralph Stanley in 2002. She was nominated for an Americana Music Award that same year for producing and arranging a tribute to Webb Pierce entitled Caught in the Webb. This album featured, along with Davies, George Jones, Emmylou Harris, Willie Nelson, Pam Tillis, Dwight Yoakam, Crystal Gayle, Charley Pride, The Del McCoury Band, Allison Moorer, Guy Clark, Dale Watson, The Jordanaires, Rosie Flores, Lionel Cartwright, Robbie Fulks, Mandy Barnett, and Billy Walker. Proceeds from this album benefit the Minnie Pearl Cancer Foundation and the Country Music Hall of Fame. Davies was inducted into the Oklahoma Music Hall of Fame in 2018.

Although semiretired, Davies continues to tour, mostly in Europe. She was named "Country Music International Ambassador" during CMA week in 2009 and released her autobiography, The Last of the Outlaws, in 2011. Her latest project is an album dedicated to her late brother entitled Unsung Hero: A Tribute to the Music of Ron Davies. Released in 2013, this album features Dolly Parton, John Prine, Alison Krauss, Vince Gill, Shelby Lynne, Rodney Crowell, Suzy Bogguss, John Anderson, Guy Clark, Bonnie Bramlett, Keven Welch and Benny Golson, among others. Proceeds from this album benefit the W.O. Smith Music School and provide musical instruments and lessons for underprivileged children.

== Personal life ==
Gail's son, Chris Scruggs, was the former co-lead singer and guitarist for the roots-country band BR549, and in 2015 joined Marty Stuart's Fabulous Superlatives as the bass player. Chris' son, Ben Scruggs, made his Grand Ole Opry debut in March 2025 playing guitar and singing three songs, two of which he wrote. Ben, who was only 10 years old at the time, received three standing ovations from the Opry audience.
