= Alexandra Stepanova =

Russian ice dancer (born 1995)

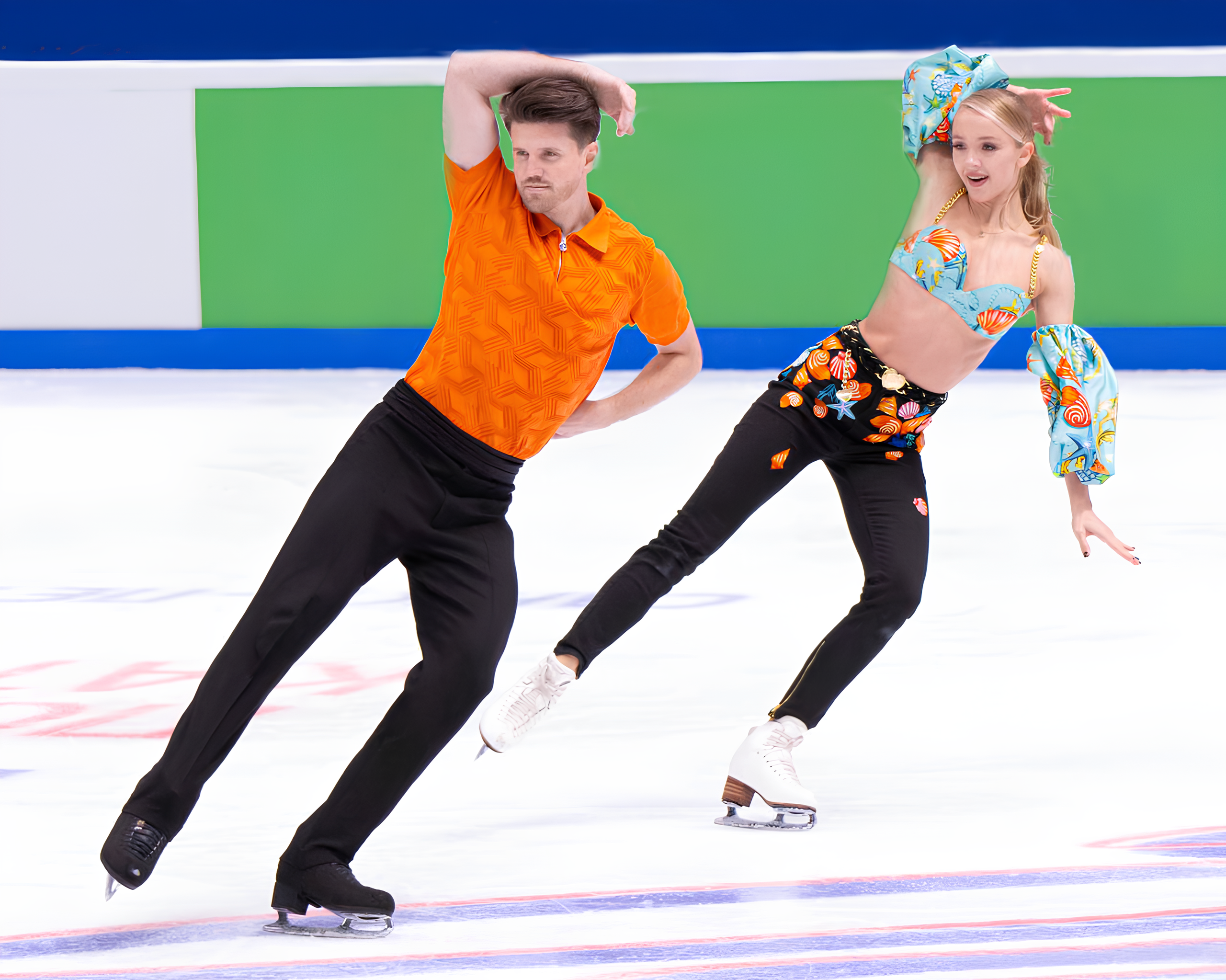
- Stepanova/Bukin at the 2024 Channel One Trophy

Personal information
- Native name: Александра Николаевна Степанова
- Full name: Alexandra Nikolayevna Stepanova
- Born: 19 August 1995 (age 31) Saint Petersburg, Russia
- Height: 1.70 m (5 ft 7 in)

Figure skating career
- Country: Russia
- Partner: Ivan Bukin
- Coach: Alexander Zhulin; Petr Durnev; Sergey Petukhov
- Skating club: UOR No 4 Moscow
- Began skating: 1999
Medal record
Representing Russia
Figure skating: Ice dancing
European Championships
Silver medal – second place	2019 Minsk	Ice dancing
Silver medal – second place	2022 Tallinn	Ice dancing
Bronze medal – third place	2020 Graz	Ice dancing
Bronze medal – third place	2018 Moscow	Ice dancing
Bronze medal – third place	2015 Stockholm	Ice dancing
Russian Championships
Gold medal – first place	2021 Chelyabinsk	Ice dancing
Gold medal – first place	2022 Saint Petersburg	Ice dancing
Gold medal – first place	2024 Chelyabinsk	Ice dancing
Gold medal – first place	2025 Omsk	Ice dancing
Gold medal – first place	2026 Saint Petersburg	Ice dancing
Silver medal – second place	2017 Chelyabinsk	Ice dancing
Silver medal – second place	2018 Saint Petersburg	Ice dancing
Silver medal – second place	2019 Saransk	Ice dancing
Silver medal – second place	2020 Krasnoyarsk	Ice dancing
Bronze medal – third place	2015 Sochi	Ice dancing
Bronze medal – third place	2016 Yekaterinburg	Ice dancing
World Junior Championships
Gold medal – first place	2013 Milan	Ice dancing
Silver medal – second place	2012 Minsk	Ice dancing
Junior Grand Prix Final
Gold medal – first place	2012–13 Sochi	Ice dancing
Bronze medal – third place	2011–12 Quebec	Ice dancing
Bronze medal – third place	2010–11 Beijing	Ice dancing

Alexandra Nikolayevna Stepanova (Russian: Александра Николаевна Степанова; born 19 August 1995) is a Russian ice dancer. With her skating partner, Ivan Bukin, she is a five-time European medalist (silver in 2019 and 2022, bronze in 2015, 2018 and 2020), the 2018 Grand Prix of Helsinki champion, the 2018 Rostelecom Cup champion, and a fifth-time Russian national champion (2021, 2022, 2024, 2025, 2026). In total, they have won eleven medals on the Grand Prix series and three Finlandia Trophy titles.

Earlier in their career, Stepanova/Bukin won the 2013 World Junior Championships, 2012–13 JGP Final, and 2014 Russian Junior Championships.

== Personal life ==
Alexandra Stepanova was born on 19 August 1995 in Saint Petersburg, Russia. Her mother is a former volleyball player and her father a speed skater.

== Career ==
=== Early years ===
Stepanova began learning to skate in 1999. As a single skater, she struggled with jumps because of her long legs, leading her coach to redirect her into ice dancing. Since there was no dance school in Saint Petersburg, she moved to Moscow. Stepanova was partnered with Bukin in 2006 by coaches Irina Zhuk and Alexander Svinin. She had no previous partners.

=== 2010–2011 to 2011–2012 ===
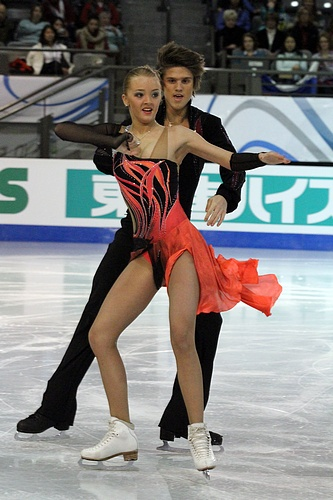
Stepanova/Bukin at the 2011 Grand Prix Final

Stepanova/Bukin debuted on the Junior Grand Prix series in the 2010–2011 season. They won both of their events and qualified for the 2010 JGP Final, where they won the bronze medal.

Stepanova/Bukin won both of their 2011–2012 JGP events, Romania and Italy. Their placements qualified them for the JGP Final where they placed fourth in the short and second in the free dance to receive the bronze medal. They won silver at the 2012 Russian Junior Championships. Stepanova/Bukin then competed at the 2012 World Junior Championships and won the silver medal.

=== 2012–2013 season: World Junior title ===
Stepanova/Bukin won gold medals at their JGP events in Turkey and Germany, qualifying them for the JGP Final in Sochi, Russia. They won the gold medal in their third appearance at the final. Stepanova/Bukin withdrew from the 2013 Russian Junior Championships due to Bukin's cold and sinusitis. They were assigned to the 2013 World Junior Championships where they won the gold medal, more than seven points ahead of French ice dancers Gabriella Papadakis / Guillaume Cizeron. After the event, the duo and their coaches discussed whether to move up to the senior level.

=== 2013–2014 season: Senior debut ===
Stepanova/Bukin decided to make their senior debut in the 2013–2014 season. They were assigned to one Grand Prix event, the 2013 Skate Canada, and finished eighth. They came in fifth at the 2013 Winter Universiade. At the Russian Championships, Stepanova/Bukin finished sixth on the senior level and won gold on the junior level ahead of Yanovskaya/Mozgov. They were assigned to the 2014 World Junior Championships but withdrew due to illness.

=== 2014–2015 season: European bronze ===
Stepanova/Bukin began their season with a gold medal at the 2014 Finlandia Trophy, an ISU Challenger Series (CS) event. Their first Grand Prix medal, bronze, came at the 2014 Skate America. At the 2014 Rostelecom Cup, they finished fifth. Stepanova/Bukin took bronze at the 2015 Russian Championships and were assigned to the 2015 European Championships in Stockholm. They were awarded the bronze medal in Sweden, ahead of Elena Ilinykh / Ruslan Zhiganshin. They ended their season at the 2015 World Championships in Shanghai, finishing ninth.

=== 2015–2016 season ===
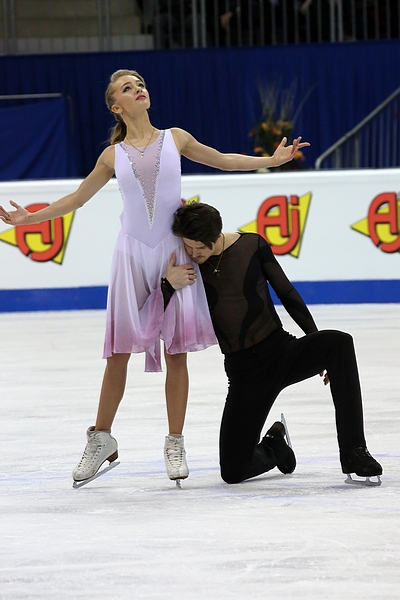
Stepanova/Bukin at the 2016 European Championships

Stepanova/Bukin had planned to begin the 2015–2016 season at the 2015 CS Finlandia Trophy, however, they withdrew because Bukin's off-season illness had slowed their preparations for the season. At the 2015 Trophée Éric Bompard, they placed third in the short dance, which was accepted as the final result following the competition's cancellation due to the November 2015 Paris attacks. They finished fourth overall at their next Grand Prix event, the 2015 NHK Trophy. Stepanova/Bukin edged out Ilinykh/Zhiganshin for the bronze medal at the Russian Championships in late December in Ekaterinburg and finished as the third Russian team, in fifth place, in January 2016 at the European Championships in Bratislava.

Stepanova/Bukin were assigned to the 2016 World Championships in Boston after Ekaterina Bobrova / Dmitri Soloviev withdrew due to a positive doping sample. They finished eleventh in the competition after placing eleventh in both the short and free dance.

=== 2016–2017 season ===
Stepanova/Bukin started their season on the Challenger Series, at the 2016 CS Finlandia Trophy. Ranked first in both segments, they earned personal best score and won the gold medal by a margin of 7.07 points over silver medalists Madison Hubbell / Zachary Donohue. Their Grand Prix assignments were the 2016 Skate Canada International, where they placed fifth, and 2016 Cup of China, where they won the bronze medal.

In December 2016 they won the silver medal at the 2017 Russian Championships. They later competed at the 2017 European Championships, where they placed fifth, and at the 2017 World Championships where they placed tenth.

=== 2017–2018 season: Second European bronze ===
Stepanova/Bukin started their season by winning the silver medal at the 2017 CS Finlandia Trophy. They then won two bronze medals in the Grand Prix series, the first bronze came at the 2017 Rostelecom Cup and the second bronze came at the 2017 Internationaux de France. They then won the silver medal at the 2018 Russian Championships. A month later they won the bronze medal at the 2018 European Championships after placing second in the short dance and third in the free dance.

They were not sent to the 2018 Winter Olympics because it was announced by the Russian Figure Skating Federation on 23 January 2018 that the International Olympic Committee did not invite Bukin to compete.

They later competed at the 2018 World Championships where they finished seventh after placing seventh in both the short dance and the free dance.

=== 2018–2019 season: European silver ===
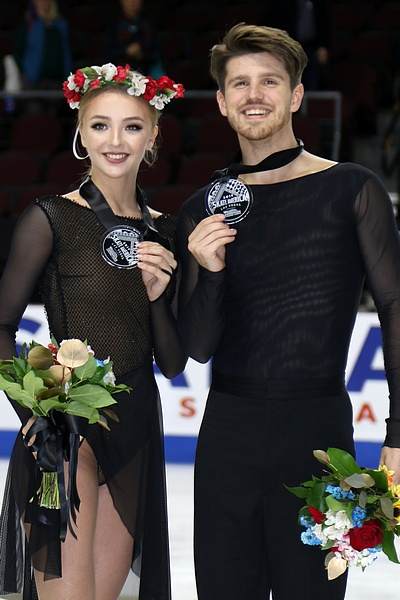
Stepanova/Bukin at the 2019 Skate America medal ceremony

Stepanova/Bukin started their season at the 2018 CS Finlandia Trophy where they won the gold medal with a personal best score of 200.78 points. This was already their third victory at the Finlandia Trophy since they had won this event also in 2014 and 2016.

In early November Stepanova/Bukin won their first Grand Prix gold medal at the 2018 Grand Prix of Helsinki. They were ranked first in both the Rhythm dance and the free dance and won the gold medal by a margin of about 4 points over the silver medalists, Charlène Guignard / Marco Fabbri. Two weeks later they won their second Grand Prix gold medal at the 2018 Rostelecom Cup. They were ranked first in both programs and beat the silver medalists, Sara Hurtado / Kirill Khaliavin by about 25 points. With two Grand Prix gold medals they qualified for the 2018–19 Grand Prix Final, where they finished fourth.

At the 2019 Russian Championships, Stepanova/Bukin placed second in both programs, taking their third consecutive silver medal, behind Victoria Sinitsina / Nikita Katsalapov, who had also finished ahead of them at the Grand Prix Final. Reflecting afterward, Stepanova said, "we didn't skate without mistakes at nationals and we know what we have to work on. There is nothing we can leave out. We have to work on everything—on technique, emotions and our mistakes, every day. You need to skate perfectly."

Competing next at the 2019 European Championships, Stepanova/Bukin placed second in the rhythm dance, behind Papadakis/Cizeron, earning their best score to date on the Tango Romantica pattern dance and capitalizing on serious errors by rivals Sinitsina/Katsalapov. They placed second in the free dance as well, winning the silver medal overall. Bukin called it "a big step forward for us." Stepanova/Bukin concluded the season at the 2019 World Championships, where they placed third in the rhythm dance, winning a small bronze medal, but dropped to fourth place after the free dance. Stepanova pronounced them "ready to fight for the top three in the world."

=== 2019–2020 season: Third European bronze ===
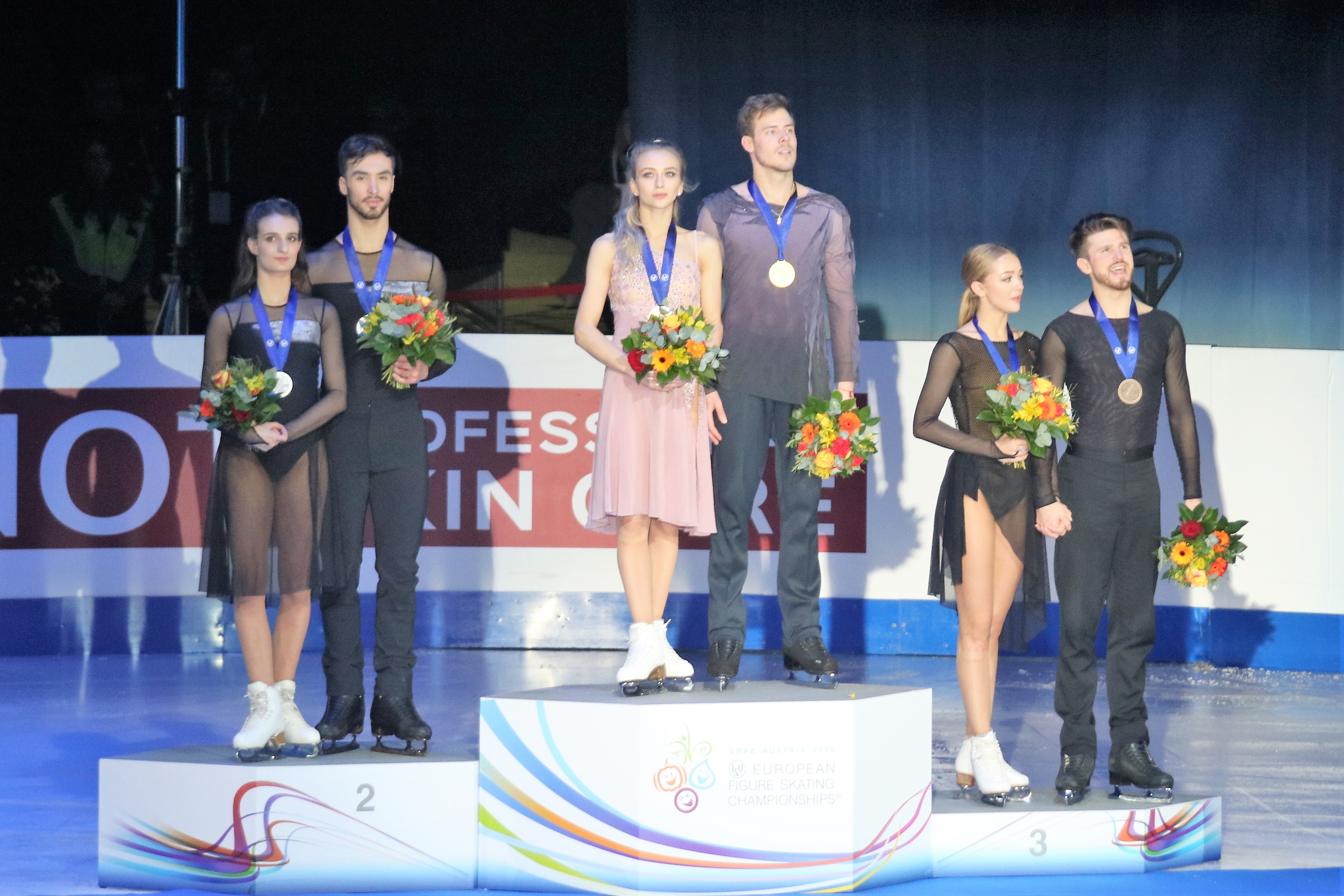
Stepanova/Bukin (right) at the 2020 European Championships

Having skipped the Challenger series due to Stepanova recovering from a back injury, they began the season at 2019 Skate America. They placed second in the short program. They narrowly won the free dance over gold medalists Madison Hubbell / Zachary Donohue, taking silver overall. Stepanova said she was "more pleased with our performance than yesterday." They won a second silver medal at the 2019 NHK Trophy, qualifying to their second Grand Prix Final. They placed fourth at the Final for the second year, notably placing ahead of domestic rivals Sinitsina/Katsalapov.

Competing at the 2020 Russian Championships, Stepanova/Bukin were second in the rhythm dance. They placed first in the free dance, but remained in second place overall behind Sinitsina/Katsalapov. Stepanova remarked "we’re happy with what we did."

In January, Stepanova/Bukin competed at the 2020 European Championships in Graz, Austria. They placed fourth in the rhythm dance and third in the free dance, taking their fourth European medal, a bronze, behind Russian teammates Sinitsina/Katsalapov and Papadakis/Cizeron of France. They had been assigned to compete at the World Championships in Montreal, but these were cancelled as a result of the coronavirus pandemic.

=== 2020–2021 season: First national title ===
Stepanova suffered from a reoccurrence of a back injury and sought treatment in Germany, as a result of which the team missed the 2020 Russian senior test skates. They were scheduled to compete on the Grand Prix at the 2020 Rostelecom Cup, but withdrew due to a COVID-19 outbreak at their training centre. It was subsequently reported that both had caught the virus in succession, leaving them only three weeks to prepare for the national championships.

With rivals Sinitsina/Katsalapov withdrawing from the 2021 Russian Championships due to contracting COVID-19 as well, Stepanova/Bukin entered the event as the heavy favourites to finally take the title. They won the rhythm dance by 3.26 points over Zahorski/Guerreiro. They won the free dance as well by a 5.96 point margin, taking the gold medal for the first time at the Russian Championships. Stepanova said afterward, "there was not much time for the preparation and we were nervous. We didn't want to skate worse than we did last year." While the European Championships were already cancelled due to the pandemic, they were assigned to the Russian team for the 2021 World Championships in Stockholm.

Following the national championships, Stepanova/Bukin participated in the 2021 Channel One Trophy, a televised team competition held in lieu of the cancelled European Championships. They were selected for the Time of Firsts team captained by Evgenia Medvedeva. They placed first in both their segments of the competition, while their team finished in second overall. They did not participate in the Russian Cup Final.

Four-time and defending World champions Papadakis/Cizeron declined to compete at the World Championships in Stockholm, seeming to invite a major contest between six teams, Stepanova/Bukin among them, to make the podium. They placed fifth in the rhythm dance, 0.35 behind Canadians Gilles/Poirier in fourth, after making errors in their steps. They were fifth in the free dance as well, holding fifth place overall. Stepanova called the rhythm dance mistakes "a huge lesson for us." Their placement combined with Sinitsina/Katsalapov's gold medal qualified three berths for Russian dance teams at the 2022 Winter Olympics.

=== 2021–2022 season: Beijing Olympics ===
Stepanova and Bukin did not appear at the Russian test skates, citing medical reasons. They were scheduled to make their debut at the 2021 CS Finlandia Trophy, but withdrew days beforehand, with their coach citing a need for additional preparation time.

Stepanova/Bukin were initially assigned to the 2021 Cup of China as their first Grand Prix event, but following its cancellation they were reassigned to the 2021 Gran Premio d'Italia. Third in both segments, they won the bronze medal. They said afterward that they felt lacking in confidence heading into the event. They won a bronze medal as well at their second event, the 2021 Internationaux de France, with Bukin saying that they had "made a little step forward since our first Grand Prix in Italy and we are more satisfied with what we did here."

At the 2022 Russian Championships, Stepanova/Bukin were second in the rhythm dance behind Sinitsina/Katsalapov. After the latter withdrew for health reasons, Stepanova/Bukin easily won their second consecutive national title. Bukin said, "something incredible, beautiful, it was really pleasant." They went on to win the silver medal at the 2022 European Championships. On January 20, they were officially named to the Russian Olympic team.

Competing at the 2022 Winter Olympics, Stepanova/Bukin placed fifth in the rhythm dance in the dance event. In the free dance, they botched the choreographic slide at the end of the program, finishing eighth in that segment and dropping to sixth overall.

=== 2022–2023 season ===
The pair did not compete during the 2022–23 season.

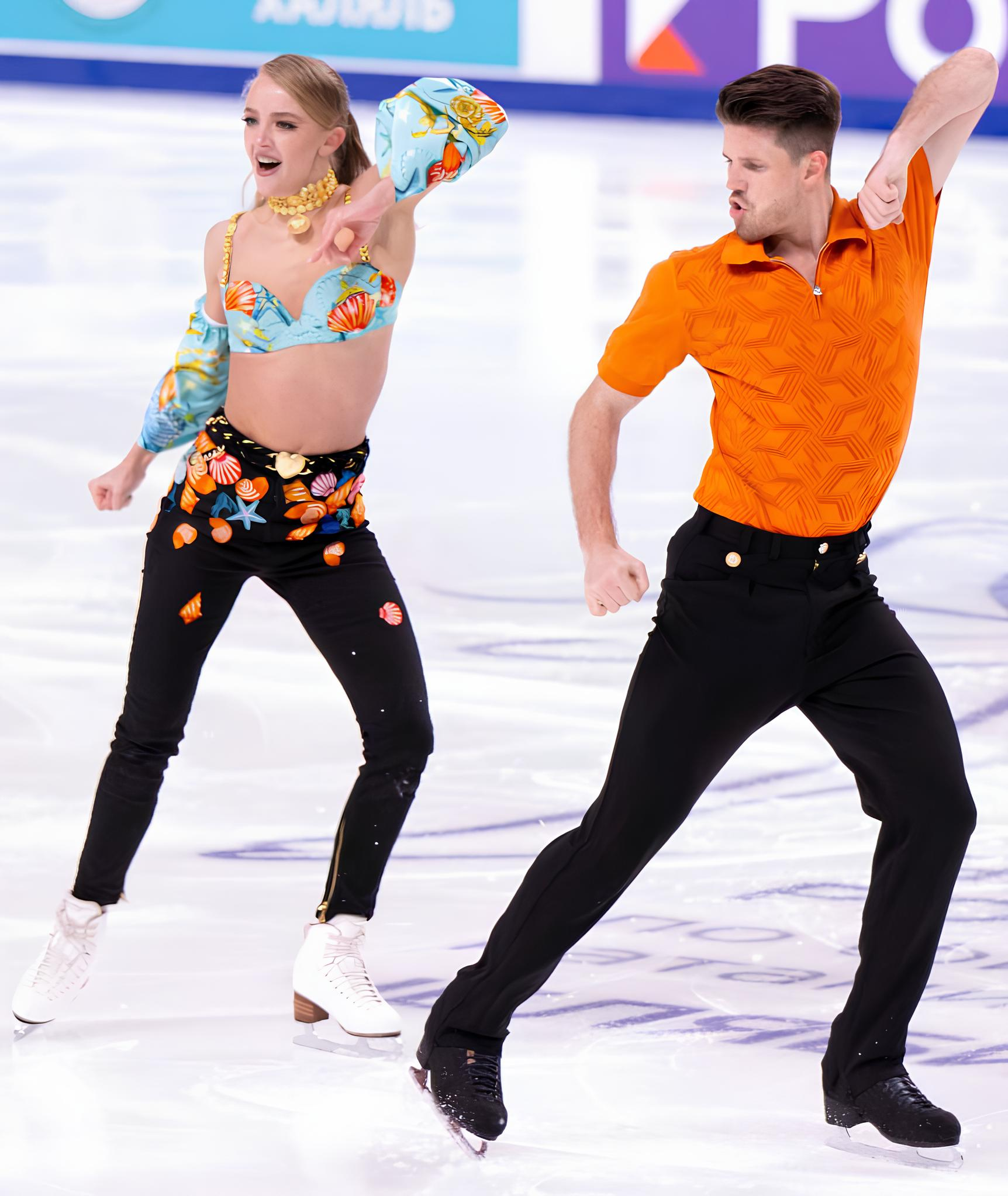
Stepanova/Bukin at the 2024 Russian Championships

=== 2023–2024 season ===
Stepanova/Bukin won both of their Russian Cup assignments. They subsequently won the 2024 Russian Championships and 2024 Russian Cup Final.

=== 2024–2025 season ===
Stepanova/Bukin were assigned to stages 1 and 4 of the Russian Cup series and won both of their assignments. In December, the pair won the Russian Championship title for the fourth time.

=== 2025–2026 season ===
Following the 2022 Russian invasion of Ukraine, the International Olympic Committee, the skating federations of Russia and Belarus could nominate one skater or team from each discipline to compete at the Skate to Milano event, as a way to qualify for the 2026 Winter Olympics as Individual Neutral Athletes (AINs). Each nominee was required to pass a special screening process. Stepanova/Bukin were nominated for neutral status but were ultimately not approved. Following the news, Stepanova shared, "We had a lot of questions when we found out. And we never learned the reasons for what happened...we considered how best to start the season, whether to take a break or not. We ended the previous season early to create interesting programs and come up with new elements for the Olympic season. I don’t want to say that some competitions aren’t important and only the Olympics matter – no. All competitions are important to us, and we prepare for each one and do a huge amount of work, but when you have the motivation and drive for the Olympics, nothing compares."

The pair continued the season domestically winning both of their Russian Cup assignments, the Russian Cup Final and the 2026 Russian Championships – making this their 5th national title. Following their win, the pair shared they are focusing on competing in the 2030 Olympics.

=== 2026–2027 season ===
On 30 June 2026, the International Skating Union announced that figure skaters from Russia and Belarus would be allowed to compete at international competitions as Individual Neutral Athletes (AINs). Each of these skaters are required to undergo an individual assessment conducted by the ISU Council to determine whether they meet the criteria for neutral status. Both Stepanova and Bukin applied for neutral status to compete internationally. Their application was later denied for not meeting the criteria listed. The pair appealed and contested this decision to the International Skating Union; being denied a second time. They were given three weeks to appeal with the Court of Arbitration of Sport.

== Programs ==
=== Ice dance (with Bukin) ===
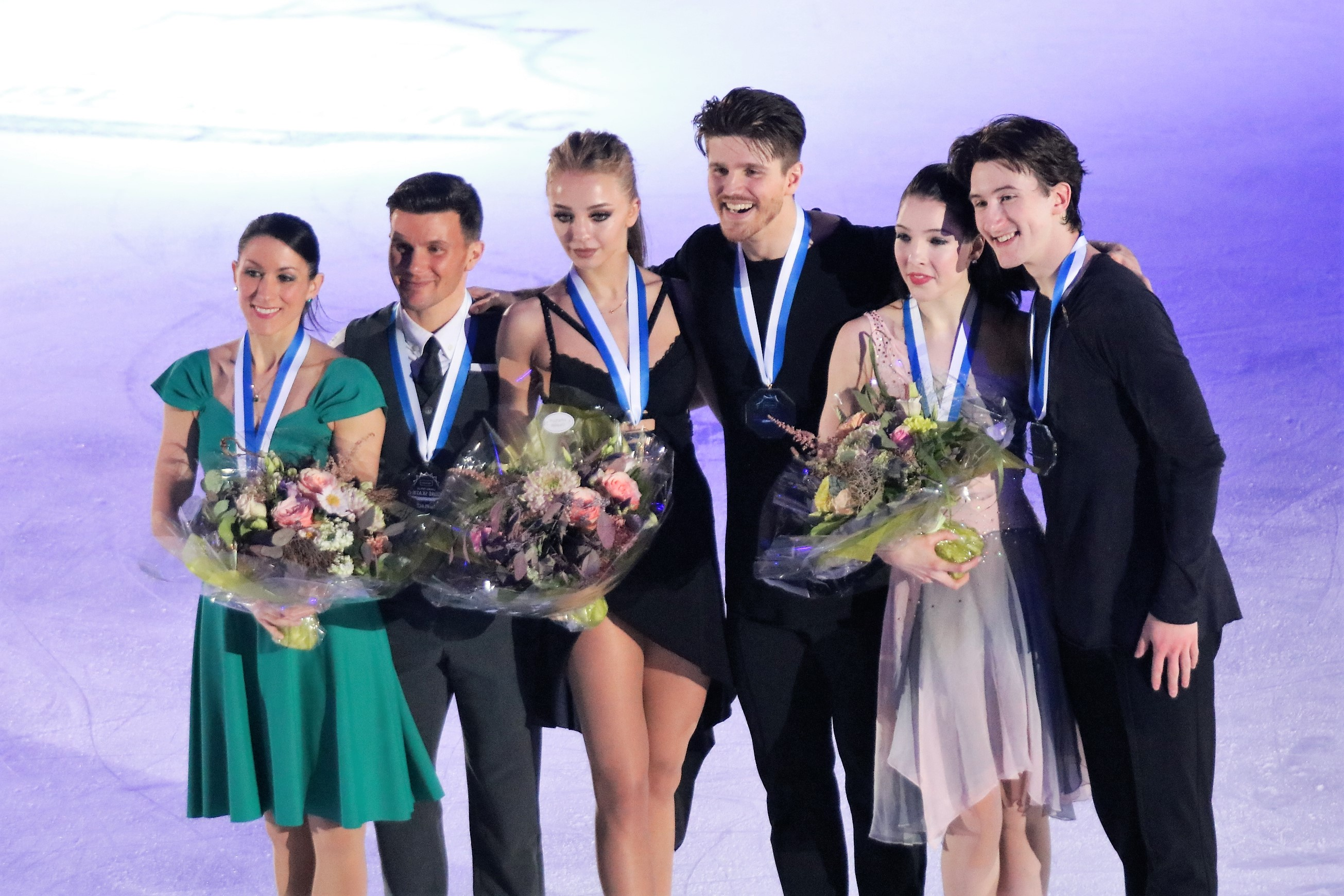
Stepanova/Bukin at the 2018 Grand Prix of Helsinki

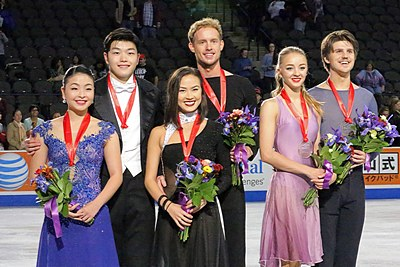
Stepanova/Bukin at the 2014 Skate America

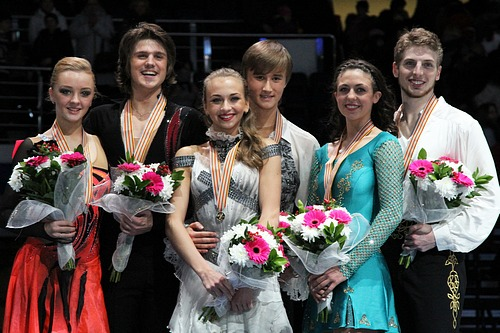
Stepanova/Bukin at the 2012 World Junior Championships

Season	Rhythm dance	Free dance	Exhibition
2025–2026	Jam; They Don't Care About Us by Michael Jackson choreo. by Peter Tchernyshev	Orpheus and Eurydice by Christoph Willibald Gluck choreo. by Sergei Petukhov	Мой ненаглядный by Pelageya
2024–2025	Oh! Darling by The Beatles; Let's Twist Again by Kal Mann, Dave Appell performed by Chubby Checker	Passagers by Les 7 doigts	
2023–2024	Don't Worry, Be Happy by Bobby McFerrin; Super Freak by Rick James choreo. by Maxim Staviski	Passagers by Les 7 doigts	
2022–2023	Did not compete this season		
2021–2022	Hip Hop: Everybody (Apashe/Oski/Lennon Remix) by Backstreet Boys; Blues: Monster by Shawn Mendes & Justin Bieber choreo. by Irina Zhuk	We Have a Map of the Piano by Múm; A Time for Us (from Romeo and Juliet) by Nino Rota choreo. by Irina Zhuk	Someone You Loved by Lewis Capaldi
2020–2021	Quickstep: Sparkling Diamonds performed by Nicole Kidman; Blues: The Show Must Go On by Queen performed by Jim Broadbent, Nicole Kidman, Anthony Weigh (from Moulin Rouge!) choreo. by Ilia Averbukh and Elena Maslennikova	Primavera by Ludovico Einaudi; Cry Me a River by Justin Timberlake choreo. by Irina Zhuk & Alexander Svinin	
2019–2020	Quickstep: Sparkling Diamonds performed by Nicole Kidman; Blues: Your Song by Elton John performed by Ewan McGregor (from Moulin Rouge!) choreo. by Ilya Averbukh and Elena Maslennikova	Primavera by Ludovico Einaudi; Cry Me a River by Justin Timberlake choreo. by Irina Zhuk & Alexander Svinin	Señorita by Shawn Mendes and Camila Cabello; Someone You Loved by Lewis Capaldi
2018–2019	Paso Doble: Malaguena performed by Blast; Tango: Tango Suite Part III by Al Di Meola; Tango: Carmen's Story performed by Édith Piaf	Am I the One performed by Beth Hart choreo. by Peter Tchernyshev	2U performed by David Guetta ft. Justin Bieber choreo. by Misha Ge
	Short dance		
2017–2018	Rhumba: Espérame en el Cielo by Mayte Martín; Samba: L'Ombelico Del Mondo by Jovanotti; Rhumba: Chandelier (Dj Maksy Rumba Remix) by Sia; Samba: Samba de Janeiro by Bellini	Theme from Love Story; Love's Dream by Rick Wakeman; Liebestraum No. 3 in A-Flat Major, S. 541 by Franz Liszt performed by Martin Jones	Fight by Nick Howard; Piano Sonata No. 14: No Me Castigues
2016–2017	Blues: At Last; Hip hop: Bills by LunchMoney Lewis choreo. by Irina Zhuk	Libertango by Astor Piazzolla arranged by E. Runge, J. Ammon; Estaciones Porteñas by Astor Piazzolla; Verano Porteño; Primavera Porteña; Libertango by Astor Piazzolla choreo. by Peter Tchernyshev	All Alone by Geir Rönning ft. Robert Wells; Trouble Maker by Trouble Maker
2015–2016	Waltz and foxtrot: The Stunt Man by Dominic Frontiere	Rachmaninoff's Revenge by Freddie Mercury, Montserrat Caballé	All Alone by Geir Rönning ft. Robert Wells
2014–2015	Paso doble: España cañí performed by Erich Kuenzel	Eleanor Rigby by The Beatles performed by Joshua Bell, Frankie Moreno	I Surrender by Celine Dion
2013–2014	Quickstep: I Can't Touch It; Foxtrot: Sixteen Tons; Quickstep: Big and Bad	Hansel & Gretel: Witch Hunters by Atli Örvarsson	
2012–2013	Swing, Swing, Swing; Boogie All Night Long; Blues	Flamenco Boléro by Gustavo Montesano	I Surrender by Celine Dion
2011–2012	Caramelo; La Colegiala	Live and Let Die by Paul McCartney	The Pink Panther by Henry Mancini
2010–2011	Waltz: Faust Symphony by Franz Liszt; Tango: Tanguera by Sexteto Mayor	The Pink Panther by Henry Mancini	
	Original dance		
2009–2010	Porushka-Paranya by Bering Strait	Kiss of Fire by Caterina Valente	

== Records and achievements ==
(with Bukin)

- Set the ice dancing world record of the new +5 / -5 GOE (Grade of Execution) system for the combined total (200.78 points), rhythm dance (79.16 points) and free dance (121.62 points) at the 2018 CS Finlandia Trophy.
- They became the first team to score above 200 points at the 2018 CS Finlandia Trophy.
- Set the ice dancing world record for the free dance (124.94 points) at the 2018 Rostelecom Cup.

== Competitive highlights ==
GP: Grand Prix; CS: Challenger Series; JGP: Junior Grand Prix

With Bukin

International
Event	09–10	10–11	11–12	12–13	13–14	14–15	15–16	16–17	17–18	18–19	19–20	20–21	21–22	23–24	24–25	25–26
Olympics													6th			
Worlds						9th	11th	10th	7th	4th	C	5th				
Europeans						3rd	5th	5th	3rd	2nd	3rd		2nd			
GP Final										4th	4th					
GP Cup of China								3rd					C			
GP Finland										1st						
GP France							3rd		3rd				3rd			
GP Italy													3rd			
GP NHK Trophy							4th				2nd					
GP Rostelecom						5th			3rd	1st		WD				
GP Skate America						3rd					2nd					
GP Skate Canada					8th			5th								
CS Finlandia						1st		1st	2nd	1st			WD			
Universiade					5th											
International: Junior
Junior Worlds			2nd	1st	WD											
JGP Final		3rd	3rd	1st												
JGP France		1st														
JGP Germany				1st												
JGP Italy			1st													
JGP Japan		1st														
JGP Romania			1st													
JGP Turkey				1st												
Pavel Roman		1st														
NRW Trophy	2nd															
National
Russian Champ.					6th	3rd	3rd	2nd	2nd	2nd	2nd	1st	1st	1st	1st	1st
Russian Junior	7th	4th	2nd	WD	1st											
Russian Cup Final														1st		
Russian GP Stage 1															1st	
Russian GP Stage 2																1st
Russian GP Stage 3														1st		
Russian GP Stage 4															1st	1st
Russian GP Stage 6														1st		
TBD = Assigned; WD = Withdrew; C = Event cancelled

== Detailed results ==
Small medals for short and free programs awarded only at ISU Championships. At team events, medals awarded for team results only.

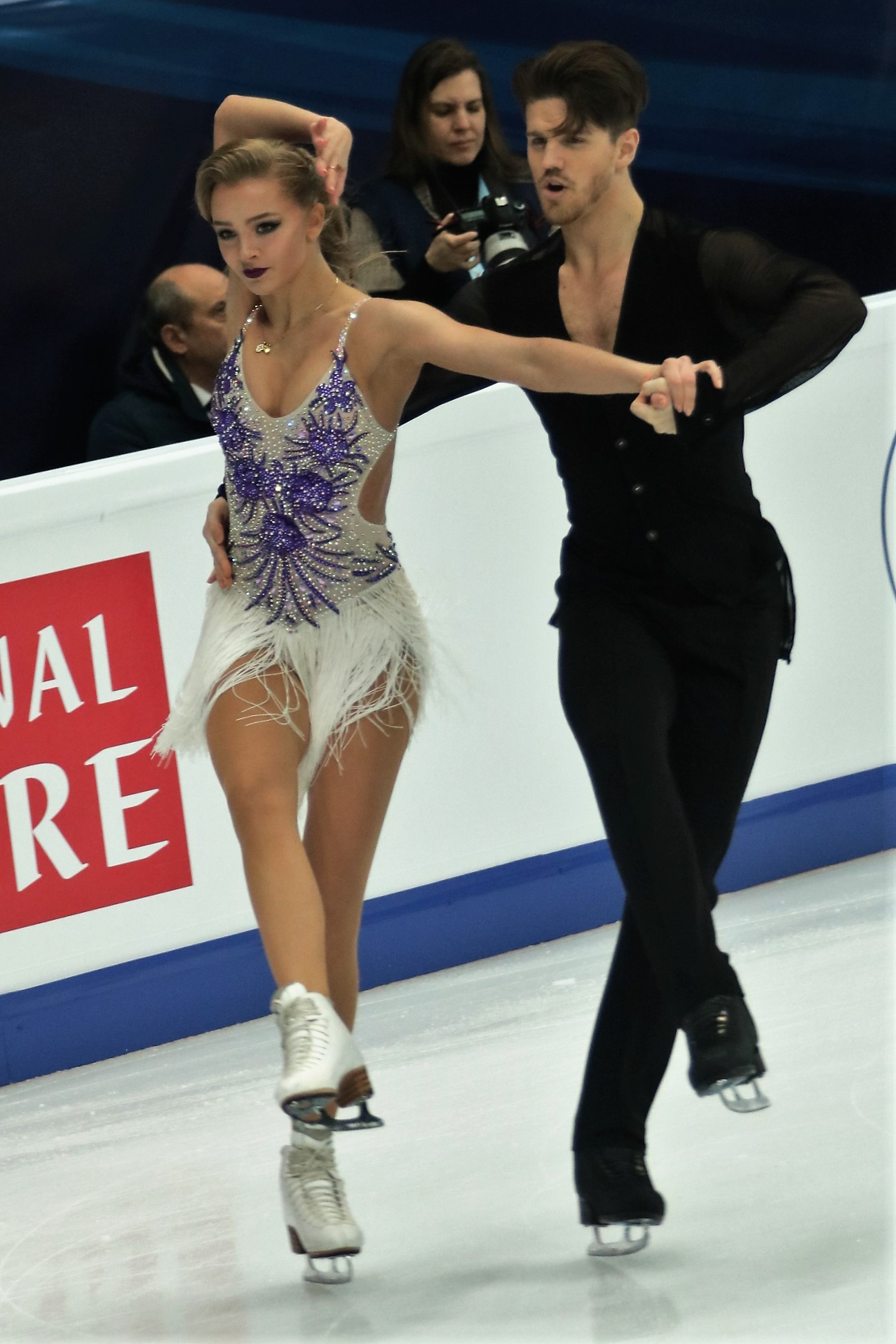
Stepanova/Bukin perform their short dance at the 2018 European Figure Skating Championships in Moscow

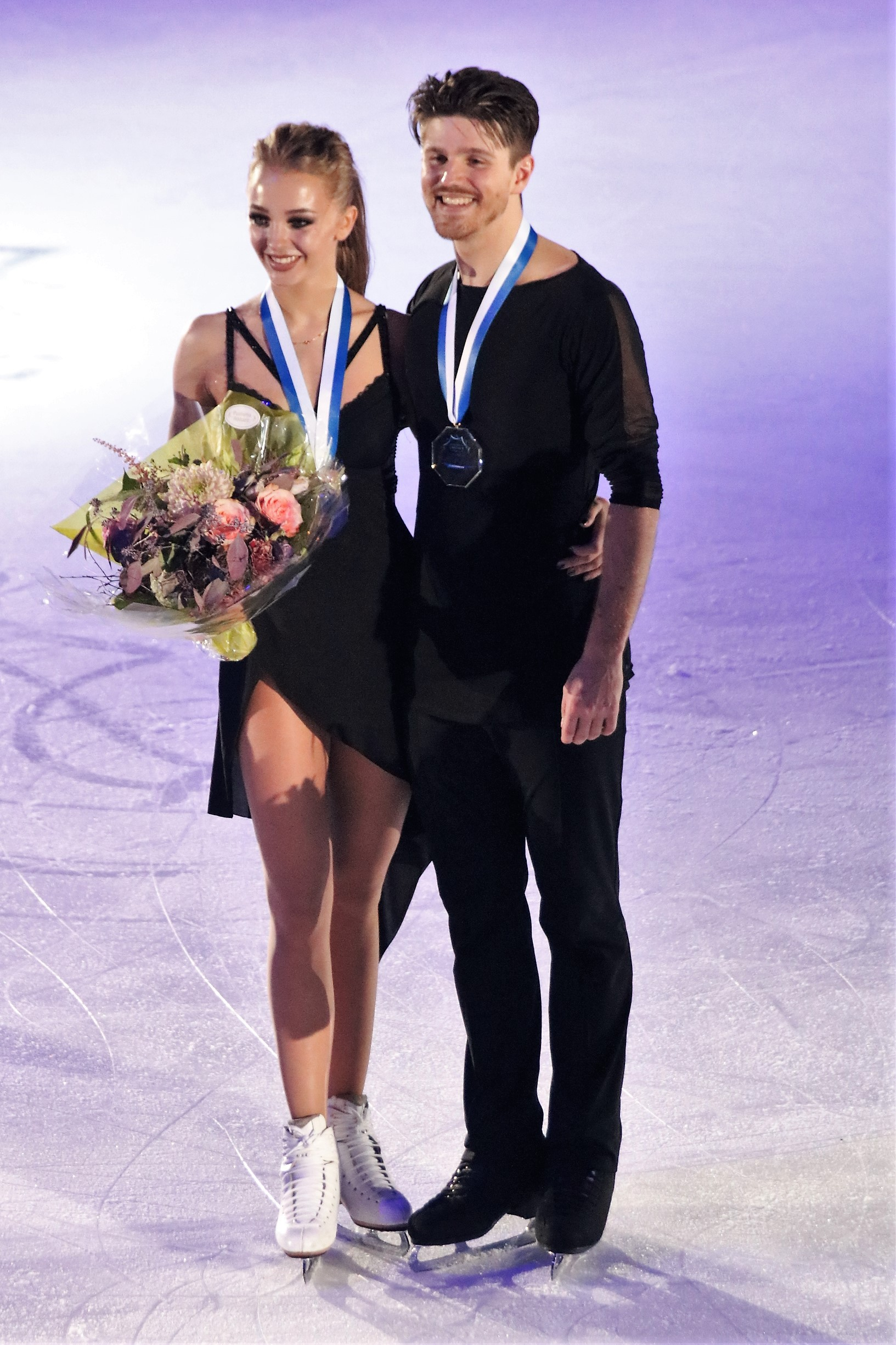
Stepanova/Bukin at the 2018 Grand Prix of Helsinki

=== Senior ===
2025–26 season
Date	Event	RD	FD	Total
March 6–9, 2026	2026 Russian Cup Final	1; 88.85	1; 131.85	1; 220.70
December 17–22, 2025	2026 Russian Championships	1; 87.45	1; 129.49	1; 216.94
November 14–17, 2025	2025 Russian Grand Prix, 4th Stage	1; 84.32	1; 125.78	1; 210.10
November 1–4, 2025	2025 Russian Grand Prix, 2nd Stage	1; 84.29	1; 126.52	1; 210.81
2024–25 season
Date	Event	RD	FD	Total
December 18–23, 2024	2025 Russian Championships	1; 85.62	1; 130.34	1; 215.96
November 15–18, 2024	2024 Russian Grand Prix, 4th Stage	1; 85.67	1; 128.23	1; 123.90
October 25–28, 2024	2024 Russian Grand Prix, 1st Stage	1; 83.35	1; 124.05	1; 207.40
2023–24 season
Date	Event	RD	FD	Total
February 14–19, 2024	2024 Russian Cup Final	1; 90.06	1; 132.47	1; 222.53
December 20–24, 2023	2024 Russian Championships	1; 86.90	1; 130.82	1; 217.72
November 24–27, 2023	2023 Russian Grand Prix, 6th Stage	1; 87.78	1; 132.66	1; 220.44
October 28–29, 2023	2023 Russian Grand Prix, 3rd Stage	1; 87.26	1; 128.01	1; 215.27
2021–22 season
Date	Event	RD	FD	Total
February 12–14, 2022	2022 Winter Olympics	5; 84.09	8; 120.98	6; 205.07
January 10–16, 2022	2022 European Championships	2; 86.45	2; 126.75	2; 213.20
December 21–26, 2021	2022 Russian Championships	2; 88.76	1; 134.61	1; 223.37
November 19–21, 2021	2021 Internationaux de France	3; 79.89	3; 120.40	3; 200.29
November 5–7, 2021	2021 Gran Premio d'Italia	3; 81.47	3; 120.71	3; 202.18
2020–21 season
Date	Event	RD	FD	Total
March 22–28, 2021	2021 World Championships	5; 83.02	5; 125.75	5; 208.77
February 5–7, 2021	2021 Channel One Trophy	1; 90.75	1; 134.20	2T/1P; 224.95
December 23–27, 2020	2021 Russian Championships	1; 87.28	1; 132.88	1; 220.16
November 20–22, 2020	2020 Rostelecom Cup	WD	WD	WD
2019–20 season
Date	Event	RD	FD	Total
January 20–26, 2020	2020 European Championships	4; 83.65	3; 127.64	3; 211.29
December 24–29, 2019	2020 Russian Championships	2; 87.13	1; 132.59	2; 219.72
December 4–8, 2019	2019–20 Grand Prix Final	5; 81.14	5; 123.74	4; 204.88
November 22–24, 2019	2019 NHK Trophy	2; 84.07	2; 124.74	2; 208.81
October 18–20, 2019	2019 Skate America	2; 81.91	1; 124.66	2; 206.57
2018–19 season
Date	Event	RD	FD	Total
March 18–24, 2019	2019 World Championships	3; 83.10	4; 125.42	4; 208.52
January 21–27, 2019	2019 European Championships	2; 81.37	2; 125.04	2; 206.41
December 19–23, 2018	2019 Russian Championships	2; 81.95	2; 126.54	2; 208.49
December 6–9, 2018	2018–19 Grand Prix Final	4; 77.20	4; 119.52	4; 196.72
November 16–18, 2018	2018 Rostelecom Cup	1; 74.49	1; 124.94	1; 199.43
November 2–4, 2018	2018 Grand Prix of Helsinki	1; 78.18	1; 121.91	1; 200.09
October 4–7, 2018	2018 CS Finlandia Trophy	1; 79.16	1; 121.62	1; 200.78
2017–18 season
Date	Event	SD	FD	Total
March 19–25, 2018	2018 World Championships	7; 74.50	7; 109.51	7; 184.01
January 15–21, 2018	2018 European Championships	2; 75.38	3; 109.48	3; 184.86
December 21–24, 2017	2018 Russian Championships	2; 76.97	2; 111.31	2; 188.28
November 17–19, 2017	2017 Internationaux de France	3; 70.02	4; 107.22	3; 177.24
October 20–22, 2017	2017 Rostelecom Cup	3; 71.32	3; 108.03	3; 179.35
October 6–8, 2017	2017 CS Finlandia Trophy	2; 70.27	2; 96.61	2; 166.88
2016–17 season
Date	Event	SD	FD	Total
Mar. 29 – Apr. 2, 2017	2017 World Championships	10; 69.07	9; 105.63	10; 174.70
January 25–29, 2017	2017 European Championships	6; 68.17	5; 98.76	5; 166.93
December 20–26, 2016	2017 Russian Championships	2; 76.47	2; 113.07	2; 189.54
November 18–20, 2016	2016 Cup of China	3; 72.09	3; 105.32	3; 177.41
October 28–30, 2016	2016 Skate Canada	5; 68.12	5; 99.98	5; 168.10
October 6–10, 2016	2016 CS Finlandia Trophy	1; 69.63	1; 103.20	1; 172.83
2015–16 season
Date	Event	SD	FD	Total
Mar. 28 – Apr. 3, 2016	2016 World Championships	11; 63.84	11; 99.46	11; 163.30
January 26–31, 2016	2016 European Championships	5; 66.65	5; 98.90	5; 165.55
December 23–27, 2015	2016 Russian Championships	3; 68.56	4; 101.70	3; 170.26
November 27–29, 2015	2015 NHK Trophy	4; 61.96	4; 98.68	4; 160.64
November 13–15, 2015	2015 Trophée Éric Bompard	3; 60.64	cancelled	3; 60.64
2014–15 season
Date	Event	SD	FD	Total
March 23–29, 2015	2015 World Championships	14; 59.62	7; 97.33	9; 156.95
Jan. 26 – Feb. 1, 2015	2015 European Championships	4; 64.95	3; 96.00	3; 160.95
December 24–27, 2014	2015 Russian Championships	2; 66.37	3; 99.82	3; 166.19
November 14–16, 2014	2014 Rostelecom Cup	5; 56.90	5; 86.61	5; 143.51
October 24–26, 2014	2014 Skate America	3; 56.37	3; 87.50	3; 143.87
October 10–12, 2014	2014 Finlandia Trophy	1; 59.46	1; 93.36	1; 152.82
2013–14 season
Date	Event	SD	FD	Total
December 24–27, 2013	2014 Russian Championships	6; 58.71	5; 93.09	6; 151.80
December 13–14, 2013	2013 Winter Universiade	6; 51.04	3; 88.24	5; 139.28
October 25–27, 2013	2013 Skate Canada International	6; 55.63	8; 77.49	8; 133.12

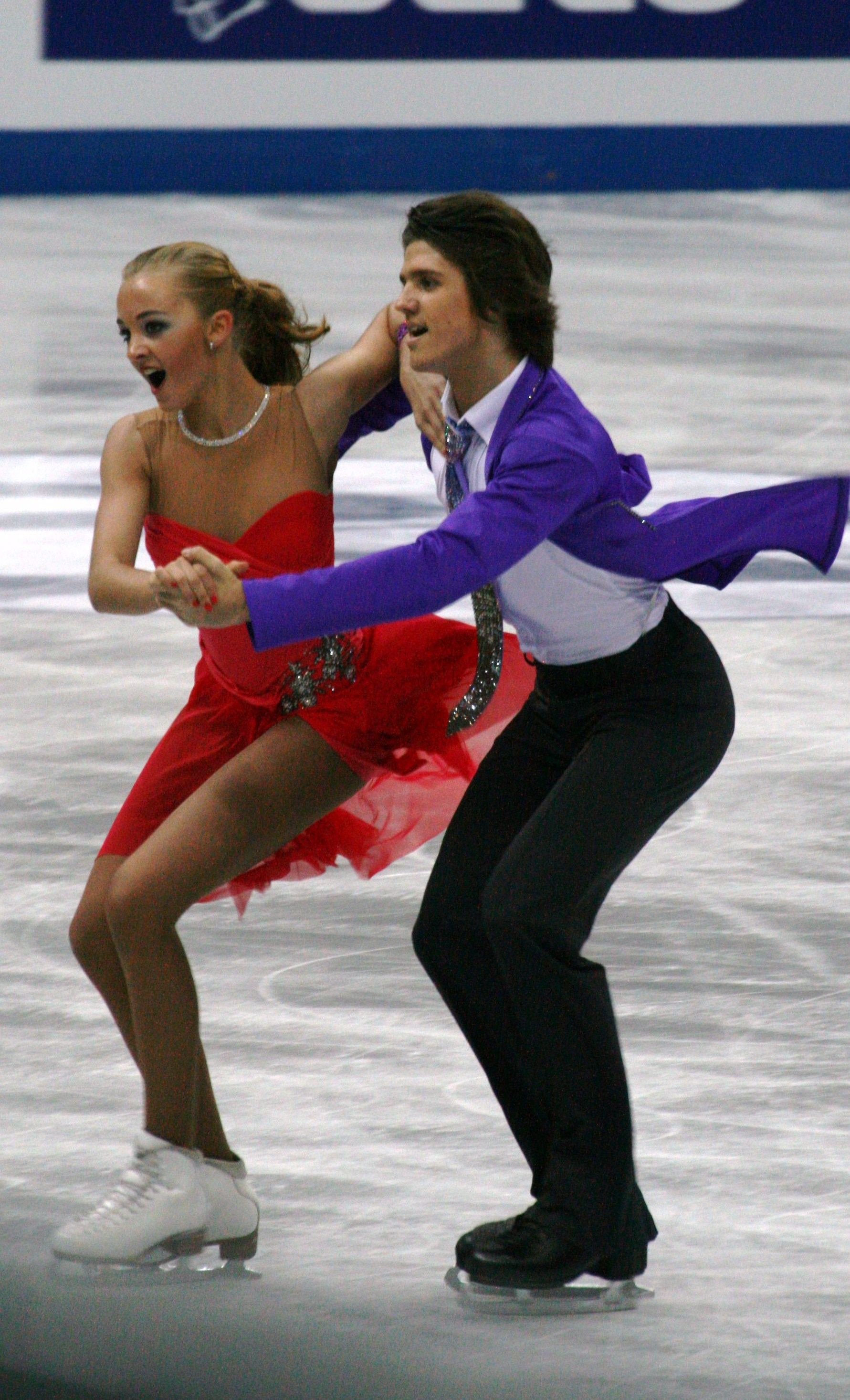
Stepanova/Bukin perform their short dance at the 2012–13 JGP Final

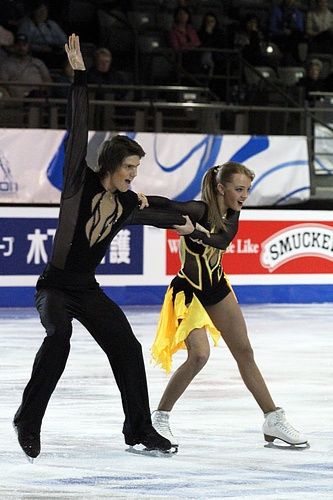
Stepanova/Bukin perform their short dance at the 2011–12 JGP Final

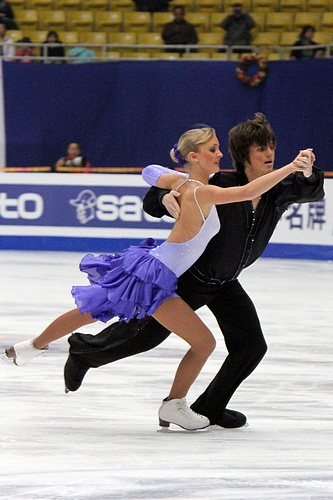
Stepanova/Bukin perform their short dance at the 2010–11 JGP Final

=== Junior ===
2013–14 season
Date	Event	Level	SD	FD	Total
January 23–25, 2014	2014 Russian Junior Championships	Junior	1; 69.12	1; 95.19	1; 164.31
2012–13 season
Date	Event	Level	SD	FD	Total
Feb. 27 – Mar. 3, 2013	2013 World Junior Championships	Junior	1; 64.65	1; 85.52	1; 150.17
December 6–9, 2012	2012–13 JGP Final	Junior	1; 61.18	1; 88.39	1; 149.57
October 10–13, 2012	2012 JGP Germany	Junior	1; 60.28	1; 86.82	1; 147.10
September 20–22, 2012	2012 JGP Turkey	Junior	1; 59.32	1; 88.41	1; 147.73
2011–12 season
Date	Event	Level	SD	FD	Total
Feb. 27 – Mar. 4, 2012	2012 World Junior Championships	Junior	2; 62.68	2; 85.06	2; 147.74
February 5–7, 2012	2012 Russian Junior Championships	Junior	2; 64.48	2; 91.24	2; 155.72
December 8–11, 2011	2011–12 JGP Final	Junior	4; 52.48	2; 82.69	3; 135.17
October 6–8, 2011	2011 JGP Italy	Junior	1; 62.86	1; 87.12	1; 149.98
September 22–24, 2011	2011 JGP Romania	Junior	1; 57.15	1; 77.14	1; 134.29
2010–11 season
Date	Event	Level	SD	FD	Total
February 2–4, 2011	2011 Russian Junior Championships	Junior	4; 57.69	5; 81.88	4; 139.57
December 9–12, 2010	2010–11 JGP Final	Junior	3; 53.59	3; 76.35	3; 129.94
September 22–26, 2010	2010 JGP Japan	Junior	2; 53.28	1; 76.80	2; 130.08
August 25–28, 2010	2010 JGP France	Junior	1; 47.98	1; 69.62	1; 117.60

2009–10 season
Date	Event	Level	CD	OD	FD	Total
February 3–6, 2010	2010 Russian Junior Championships	Junior	8; 30.18	7; 47.36	9; 72.38	7; 149.92
November 6–8, 2009	2009 NRW Trophy	Junior	2 -	2 -	2 -	2; 149.92
