= Bering Strait (disambiguation) =

The Bering Strait is the strait that connects the Arctic Ocean and the Bering Sea.

Bering Strait or Bering Straits may also refer to:

- Bering Strait (band), a Russian country-and-western band
  - Bering Strait (album), the band's debut album, released in 2003
- Bering Strait crossing or Bering Strait bridge, a proposal for a bridge and/or tunnel crossing of the strait
- Bering Strait School District, a public school district serving most of the Nome Census Area, Alaska, United States
- Bering Straits Native Corporation, a company created by the provisions of the Alaska Native Claims Settlement Act, also serving the Nome Census Area
- Beringia or the "Bering strait land bridge", an ice-age-era land bridge connecting present-day Asia and North America
- USS Bering Strait (AVP-34), a United States Navy seaplane tender in commission from 1944 to 1946
- USCGC Bering Strait (WAVP-382), later WHEC-382, a United States Coast Guard cutter in commission from 1948 to 1971

== See also ==
- Bering (disambiguation)
