= Pages (Bering Strait album) =

Studio album by Bering Strait
- Released: June 28, 2005
- Genre: Country
- Length: 42:58 (US)
- Label: Universal South
- Producer: Carl Jackson, Jerry Douglas

Bering Strait chronology
Bering Strait (2003)	Pages (2005)

Pages is the second studio album from the country music band Bering Strait. It was released June 28, 2005 via Universal South Records (now Show Dog-Universal Music). The album was produced by Carl Jackson, except for "From Ankara to Izmir", which was produced by Jerry Douglas.

== Critical reception ==
Ken Devine of Glide magazine wrote that "With all their talent, Bering Strait is bound to attract the kind of following of an influence like Nickel Creek. Pages may be a little hard to turn at times, but for Bering Strait, it’s one chapter closer to the walk of fame."

== Track listing ==
1. "Safe In My Lover's Arms" (Lydia Salnikova) – 4:12
2. "Oy, Moroz-Moroz" (traditional; arr. by Natalya Borzilova, Lydia Salnikova, Alexander Arzamastsev, Sergei Olkhovskiy, Ilya Toshinsky and Sasha Ostrovsky) – 3:21
3. "From Ankara to Izmir" (Jerry Douglas) – 6:56
4. "Long Time Comin'" (Salnikova, Billy Montana) – 3:33
5. "Just Imagine" (Shane Teeters, Gary Harrison) – 3:33
6. "Pages" (Jenny Yates, Tom Kimmel) – 3:33
7. "You Make Loving Fun" (Christine McVie) – 3:56
8. "Cruel Man" (Borzilova) – 3:17
9. "What's for Dinner?" (Borzilova, Salnikova, Arzamastsev, Olkhovskiy, Toshinsky, Ostrovsky) – 3:40
10. "Choose Your Partner" (Marv Green, Steve Bogard) – 3:34
11. "It Hurts Just a Little" (Ostrovsky, Brent Maher) – 3:01

== Personnel ==
=== Bering Strait ===
- Alexander Arzamastsev - drums, percussion
- Natasha Borzilova - vocals, acoustic guitar, gut string guitar
- Sergei "Spooky" Olkhovsky - bass guitar
- Sasha Ostrovsky - Dobro, pedal steel guitar, lap steel guitar, slide guitar
- Lydia Salnikova - vocals, keyboards, piano, Wurlitzer electric piano

=== Additional musicians ===
- Jerry Douglas - dobro
- Carl Jackson - background vocals
- Carl Marsh - string arrangement
- Ilya Toshinsky - acoustic guitar, electric guitar, banjo, background vocals
- Jerry Williams - string arrangement
