= 2016 CS Finlandia Trophy =

Figure skating competition

2016 Finlandia Trophy
- Type: ISU Challenger Series
- Date: October 6 – 10
- Season: 2016–17
- Location: Espoo
- Venue: Espoo Metro Areena

Champions
- Men's singles: (United States) Nathan Chen
- Ladies' singles: (Canada) Kaetlyn Osmond
- Pairs: (Canada) Meagan Duhamel / Eric Radford
- Ice dance: (Russia) Alexandra Stepanova / Ivan Bukin
- Synchronized skating: (Russia) Paradise
- Previous: 2015 CS Finlandia Trophy
- Next: 2017 CS Finlandia Trophy

The 2016 CS Finlandia Trophy was a senior international figure skating competition held in October 2016 in Espoo. It was part of the 2016–17 ISU Challenger Series. Medals were awarded in the disciplines of men's singles, ladies' singles, pair skating, and ice dancing.

== Entries ==
The International Skating Union published the full preliminary list of entries on 12 September 2016.

| Country | Men | Ladies | Pairs | Ice dance |
|---|---|---|---|---|
| Australia | | | Ekaterina Alexandrovskaya / Harley Windsor | |
| Belgium | Jorik Hendrickx | Loena Hendrickx | | |
| Canada | Patrick Chan | Kaetlyn Osmond | Meagan Duhamel / Eric Radford | |
| Czech Republic | Jiří Bělohradský | | | |
| Denmark | | | | Laurence Fournier Beaudry / Nikolaj Sørensen |
| Estonia | Samuel Koppel; Daniel Albert Naurits | Helery Hälvin | | |
| Finland | Bela Papp | Liubov Efimenko; Viveca Lindfors; Emmi Peltonen | | Olesia Karmi / Max Lindholm; Cecilia Törn / Jussiville Partanen |
| Germany | Paul Fentz | Nicole Schott | Minerva Fabienne Hase / Nolan Seegert; Mari Vartmann / Ruben Blommaert | |
| Israel | Oleksii Bychenko; Daniel Samohin | Aimee Buchanan; Elizaveta Yushchenko | | |
| Italy | Ivan Righini | Ilaria Nogaro | | |
| Japan | Ryuju Hino | Mao Asada | | Emi Hirai / Marien de la Asuncion |
| Lithuania | | | | Taylor Tran / Saulius Ambrulevičius |
| Poland | | | | Natalia Kaliszek / Maksym Spodyriev |
| Russia | Mikhail Kolyada; Maxim Kovtun; Alexander Petrov | Anna Pogorilaya; Serafima Sakhanovich; Elizaveta Tuktamysheva | Kristina Astakhova / Alexei Rogonov | Alexandra Stepanova / Ivan Bukin; Tiffany Zahorski / Jonathan Guerreiro |
| Slovenia | | Daša Grm | | |
| Spain | | | | Olivia Smart / Adrià Díaz |
| Sweden | Alexander Majorov | Joshi Helgesson | | |
| Switzerland | Nicola Todeschini | Yasmine Kimiko Yamada | Ioulia Chtchetinina / Noah Scherer; Alexandra Herbríková / Nicolas Roulet | |
| United Kingdom | | Danielle Harrison; Karly Robertson | | |
| United States | Nathan Chen | Courtney Hicks | Ashley Cain / Timothy LeDuc; Tarah Kayne / Daniel O'Shea | Madison Hubbell / Zachary Donohue |

=== Changes ===
| Change | Men | Ladies | Pairs | Ice dance |
|---|---|---|---|---|
| Withdrew before starting orders drawn | Michal Březina (CZE); Roman Galay (FIN); Valtter Virtanen (FIN); Alexander Bjelde (GER); Igor Reznichenko (POL); Artur Dmitriev Jr. (RUS) | Janina Makeenka (BLR); Jelizaveta Leonova (EST); Netta Schreiber (ISR); Shaline Rüegger (SUI) | Ksenia Stolbova / Fedor Klimov (RUS); Jessica Calalang / Zack Sidhu (USA); Alexa Scimeca Knierim / Chris Knierim (USA); Vera Bazarova / Andrei Deputat (RUS) | Kaitlyn Weaver / Andrew Poje (CAN); Olga Jakushina / Andrey Nevskiy (LAT) |
| Added | Bela Papp (FIN); Maxim Kovtun (RUS) | | Kristina Astakhova / Alexei Rogonov (RUS); Ashley Cain / Timothy Leduc (USA) | |

== Results ==
=== Men ===
| Rank | Name | Nation | Total points | SP | | FS | |
|---|---|---|---|---|---|---|---|
| 1 | Nathan Chen | United States | 256.44 | 2 | 87.50 | 1 | 168.94 |
| 2 | Patrick Chan | Canada | 248.73 | 3 | 84.59 | 2 | 164.14 |
| 3 | Maxim Kovtun | Russia | 229.57 | 1 | 88.26 | 4 | 141.31 |
| 4 | Mikhail Kolyada | Russia | 219.55 | 4 | 80.20 | 5 | 139.35 |
| 5 | Jorik Hendrickx | Belgium | 218.32 | 5 | 79.22 | 6 | 139.10 |
| 6 | Alexander Petrov | Russia | 211.80 | 7 | 69.71 | 3 | 142.09 |
| 7 | Oleksii Bychenko | Israel | 203.75 | 6 | 74.17 | 10 | 129.58 |
| 8 | Paul Fentz | Germany | 196.12 | 8 | 62.36 | 8 | 133.76 |
| 9 | Alexander Majorov | Sweden | 193.78 | 12 | 56.06 | 7 | 137.72 |
| 10 | Ivan Righini | Italy | 191.81 | 9 | 61.73 | 9 | 130.08 |
| 11 | Ryuju Hino | Japan | 181.25 | 13 | 55.91 | 11 | 125.34 |
| 12 | Jiří Bělohradský | Czech Republic | 175.63 | 10 | 61.59 | 12 | 114.04 |
| 13 | Daniel Samohin | Israel | 160.97 | 14 | 52.03 | 13 | 108.94 |
| 14 | Daniel Albert Naurits | Estonia | 152.41 | 11 | 56.84 | 16 | 95.57 |
| 15 | Bela Papp | Finland | 148.84 | 15 | 47.18 | 14 | 101.66 |
| 16 | Samuel Koppel | Estonia | 143.32 | 16 | 46.38 | 15 | 96.94 |

=== Ladies ===
| Rank | Name | Nation | Total points | SP | | FS | |
|---|---|---|---|---|---|---|---|
| 1 | Kaetlyn Osmond | Canada | 187.27 | 3 | 64.73 | 1 | 122.54 |
| 2 | Mao Asada | Japan | 186.16 | 2 | 64.87 | 2 | 121.29 |
| 3 | Anna Pogorilaya | Russia | 182.80 | 1 | 69.50 | 3 | 113.30 |
| 4 | Elizaveta Tuktamysheva | Russia | 165.59 | 4 | 62.99 | 4 | 102.60 |
| 5 | Nicole Schott | Germany | 150.00 | 7 | 51.03 | 7 | 98.97 |
| 6 | Courtney Hicks | United States | 149.80 | 5 | 57.41 | 8 | 92.39 |
| 7 | Loena Hendrickx | Belgium | 148.16 | 8 | 48.81 | 6 | 99.35 |
| 8 | Serafima Sakhanovich | Russia | 143.37 | 14 | 42.88 | 5 | 100.49 |
| 9 | Joshi Helgesson | Sweden | 142.30 | 6 | 56.12 | 10 | 86.18 |
| 10 | Viveca Lindfors | Finland | 137.10 | 10 | 47.07 | 9 | 90.03 |
| 11 | Danielle Harrison | United Kingdom | 125.89 | 9 | 47.72 | 12 | 78.17 |
| 12 | Emmi Peltonen | Finland | 124.17 | 11 | 46.49 | 13 | 77.68 |
| 13 | Karly Robertson | United Kingdom | 120.54 | 13 | 44.79 | 14 | 75.75 |
| 14 | Liubov Efimenko | Finland | 119.42 | 16 | 39.76 | 11 | 79.66 |
| 15 | Helery Hälvin | Estonia | 116.39 | 12 | 45.24 | 16 | 71.15 |
| 16 | Aimee Buchanan | Israel | 110.41 | 15 | 40.86 | 17 | 69.55 |
| 17 | Daša Grm | Slovenia | 105.00 | 18 | 31.37 | 15 | 73.63 |
| 18 | Yasmine Yamada | Switzerland | 98.09 | 17 | 38.50 | 19 | 59.59 |
| 19 | Ilaria Nogaro | Italy | 90.87 | 19 | 31.01 | 18 | 59.86 |

=== Pairs ===
| Rank | Name | Nation | Total points | SP | | FS | |
|---|---|---|---|---|---|---|---|
| 1 | Meagan Duhamel / Eric Radford | Canada | 197.78 | 1 | 66.49 | 1 | 131.29 |
| 2 | Kristina Astakhova / Alexei Rogonov | Russia | 169.10 | 2 | 57.26 | 2 | 111.84 |
| 3 | Mari Vartmann / Ruben Blommaert | Germany | 164.91 | 3 | 56.58 | 3 | 108.33 |
| 4 | Ashley Cain / Timothy LeDuc | United States | 158.63 | 6 | 54.26 | 4 | 104.37 |
| 5 | Tarah Kayne / Daniel O'Shea | United States | 158.11 | 4 | 54.65 | 5 | 103.46 |
| 6 | Ekaterina Alexandrovskaya / Harley Windsor | Australia | 147.02 | 5 | 54.54 | 6 | 92.48 |
| 7 | Minerva Fabienne Hase / Nolan Seegert | Germany | 127.55 | 7 | 50.28 | 8 | 77.27 |
| 8 | Alexandra Herbríková / Nicolas Roulet | Switzerland | 117.36 | 8 | 38.84 | 7 | 78.52 |
| 9 | Ioulia Chtchetinina / Noah Scherer | Switzerland | 104.32 | 9 | 33.61 | 9 | 70.71 |

=== Ice dancing ===
| Rank | Name | Nation | Total points | SD | | FD | |
|---|---|---|---|---|---|---|---|
| 1 | Alexandra Stepanova / Ivan Bukin | Russia | 172.83 | 1 | 69.63 | 1 | 103.20 |
| 2 | Madison Hubbell / Zachary Donohue | United States | 165.76 | 2 | 65.31 | 2 | 100.45 |
| 3 | Tiffany Zahorski / Jonathan Guerreiro | Russia | 153.00 | 3 | 62.27 | 4 | 90.73 |
| 4 | Laurence Fournier Beaudry / Nikolaj Sørensen | Denmark | 149.69 | 5 | 58.76 | 3 | 90.93 |
| 5 | Natalia Kaliszek / Maksym Spodyriev | Poland | 147.46 | 4 | 60.62 | 5 | 86.84 |
| 6 | Olivia Smart / Adrià Díaz | Spain | 142.12 | 6 | 55.89 | 6 | 86.23 |
| 7 | Cecilia Törn / Jussiville Partanen | Finland | 126.93 | 7 | 46.66 | 7 | 80.27 |
| 8 | Taylor Tran / Saulius Ambrulevičius | Lithuania | 117.63 | 8 | 45.27 | 8 | 72.36 |
| 9 | Emi Hirai / Marien de la Asuncion | Japan | 102.03 | 9 | 44.07 | 10 | 57.96 |
| 10 | Olesia Karmi / Max Lindholm | Finland | 101.02 | 10 | 42.80 | 9 | 58.22 |

=== Synchronized skating ===
| Rank | Name | Nation | Total (SP) |
|---|---|---|---|
| 1 | Paradise | Russia | 65.61 |
| 2 | Marigold IceUnity | Finland | 64.57 |
| 3 | Team Unique | Finland | 62.04 |
| 4 | Revolutions | Finland | 54.52 |
| 5 | Rockettes | Finland | 48.76 |
