= Jagged Edge of a Broken Heart =

Single by Gail Davies

from the album Where Is a Woman to Go
- B-side: "Lion in the Winter"
- Released: September 1984
- Recorded: June 1984; Nashville, TN, U.S.
- Label: RCA Nashville
- Songwriters: Walker Igleheart; Mike Joyce
- Producers: Gail Davies; Leland Sklar

Gail Davies singles chronology
"It's You Alone" (1984)	"Jagged Edge of a Broken Heart" (1984)	"Nothing Can Hurt Me Now" (1985)

"Jagged Edge of a Broken Heart" is a song written by Walker Igleheart and Mike Joyce. It was originally recorded and released as a single by American country artist Gail Davies.

The song was originally recorded in June 1984 at the "Emerald Sound Studio", located in Nashville, Tennessee, United States. The session was co-produced by Davies and Leland Sklar. Released as a single of September 1984, "Jagged Edge of a Broken Heart" peaked in the twentieth position on the Billboard Hot Country Singles & Tracks chart. It became her eleventh top-twenty single on the latter chart. In addition, the single peaked within the top-forty on the Canadian RPM Country Tracks chart.

According to Davies' autobiography The Last of the Outlaws, "Jagged Edge of a Broken Heart" was played by radio as if it had been a top-five hit on the Billboard country chart. However, the single only reached the top-twenty.

In 2001, the song was covered by the Russian country band Bering Strait.

== Chart performance ==
Chart (1984–1985)	Peak position
Canada Country Songs (RPM)	38
US Hot Country Singles & Tracks (Billboard)	20
