= Bering Strait (album) =

Studio album by Bering Strait
- Released: January 14, 2003
- Genre: Country
- Length: 47:08 (US edition)
- Label: Universal South
- Producers: Brent Maher; Tony Brown; Stan Cornelius

Bering Strait chronology
Bering Strait (2003)	Pages (2005)

Bering Strait is the self-titled debut studio album by Russian country music band Bering Strait. It was released on January 14, 2003, via Universal South Records, now known as Show Dog-Universal Music.

Music videos were produced for "When Going Home", "Jagged Edge of a Broken Heart" and the 2002 Grammy Award nominee "Bearing Straight". Ultimately, "Bearing Straight" was aired on national television as a country music video, whereas "Jagged Edge" was aired on the Great American Country video music cable channel and distributed as a digital file on the CD album itself. "When Going Home" was never publicly distributed.

Professional ratings
Review scores
Source	Rating
Allmusic	link

== Track listing ==
1. "What Is It About You" (Brian Dean Maher, Billy Montana, Helen Darling) – 3:53
2. "Tell Me Tonight" (Ilya Toshinsky, Kevin Welch, Brent Maher) – 3:53
3. "I Could Be Persuaded" (Tony Marty, Brenton Roberts) – 2:50
4. "When Going Home" (George Teren, Stephanie Lewis) – 4:08
5. "I'm Not Missing You" (Maher, Jenai) – 4:26
6. "I Could Use a Hero" (Jenai, Montana) – 4:22
7. "The Trouble with Love" (Candy Parton, Mary Ann Kennedy, Pam Rose) – 3:44
8. "Jagged Edge of a Broken Heart" (Walker Ingleheart, Mike Joyce) – 3:58
9. "Only This Love" (Toshinsky, Mike Reid, Maher) – 3:33
10. "Bearing Straight" (instrumental) (Toshinsky, Lydia Salnikova, Sasha Ostrovsky, Sergei Passov) – 5:52
11. "Porushka-Paranya" (traditional) – 2:41
12. "Like a Child" (Live) (Bob DiPiero, Carolyn Dawn Johnson) – 3:46

== Personnel ==
From Bering Strait liner notes.

Bering Strait

- Alexander Arzamastsev - drums, percussion
- Natasha Borzilova - lead vocals, acoustic guitar
- Sergey "Spooky" Olkhovsky - bass guitar
- Sergei Passov - mandolin, fiddle
- Lydia Salnikova - keyboards, background vocals, second lead vocals on "I Could Use a Hero" and "Porushka-Paranya"
- Sasha Ostrovsky - steel guitar, lap steel guitar, Dobro
- Ilya Toshinsky - electric guitar, acoustic guitar, banjo, background vocals

Additional musicians

- Eddie Bayers - drum programming, percussion
- Spencer Campbell - bass overdubs
- Vince Gill - background vocals on "When Going Home"

Technical

- Tony Brown - producer ("When Going Home" only)
- Stan Cornelius - producer ("I Could Be Persuaded" and "Porushka-Paranya"), executive producer
- Ken Love - mastering
- Brent Maher - producer (all tracks), recording, mixing

== Charts ==
Chart (2003)	Peak position
US Billboard 200	98
US Top Country Albums (Billboard)	17
