= Bering Strait (band) =

Russian country music band

- Also known as: Siberian Heatwave
- Origin: Obninsk, Russia
- Genre: Country
- Years active: 1995–2006
- Label: Universal South
- Past members: Andrei Misikhin; Alexander Arzamastsev; Natasha Borzilova; Sergey "Spooky" Olkhovsky; Sergei Passov; Lydia Salnikova; Sasha Ostrovsky; Ilya Toshinsky

Bering Strait was a Russian country music band, whose style was sometimes called "redgrass". In 2003, the band was nominated for a Grammy Award and appeared on the TV show 60 Minutes. The group disbanded in 2006. The lineup on their first album was Alexander Arzamastsev (drums), Natasha Borzilova (lead vocals), Sergey "Spooky" Olkhovsky (bass guitar), Sergei Passov (mandolin, fiddle), Lydia Salnikova (keyboards, background vocals), Sasha Ostrovsky (steel guitar, Dobro) and Ilya Toshinsky (electric guitar, banjo).

== History ==
Bering Strait was the band's third name, beginning with Cheerful Diligence. In 1996, they recorded in the US under the name Siberian Heatwave and were guests on Prime Time Country on the Nashville Network. The band dissolved in late May 2006, but the announcement was not made until June 1, 2006. At the time of its dissolution, the band comprised five musicians: Alexander Arzamastsev (drums), Natasha Borzilova (lead vocals, acoustic guitar), Sergei "Spooky" Olkhovsky (bass), Alexander "Sasha" Ostrovsky (dobro, steel guitar, lap steel), and Lydia Salnikova (lead vocals, keyboards).

Ilya Toshinsky played electric guitar, acoustic guitar, and banjo on the band's first album but left the band after recording the second album. Other former Bering Strait musicians included Sergei Passov (mandolin and fiddle), and Andrei Misikhin (bass). Chris Pandolfi, of the bluegrass band the Infamous Stringdusters, played banjo on their tours. Natasha Borzilova is the daughter of a nuclear scientist who died from the results of the Chernobyl disaster.

Bering Strait's self-titled debut album was released in 2003 on Universal South Records, now known as Show Dog-Universal Music. The song "Bearing Straight" was nominated for a Grammy Award for Best Country Instrumental. Universal South released the instrumental track as a radio single in order to qualify it for the Grammy Awards.

A documentary, The Ballad of Bering Strait, chronicled the band's career over two and a half years and was released to theaters and broadcast on Country Music Television. The second album, Pages was released in 2005 and featured a more rootsy, less polished sound. The first single from the album was a cover version of "You Make Loving Fun" by Fleetwood Mac.

After their second album, Bering Strait disbanded. Toshinsky became a session musician, playing guitar and banjo for various artists. He also released one solo album, Red Grass, in 2016.

== Discography ==
=== Albums ===
Title	Album details	Peak chart positions	
Title	Album details	US Country	US
Bering Strait	Release date: January 14, 2003; Label: Universal South	17	98
Pages	Release date: June 28, 2005; Label: Universal South	—	—
"—" denotes releases that did not chart

=== Singles ===
Year	Single	Album
2001	"Jagged Edge of a Broken Heart"	Bering Strait
2002	"Bearing Straight"	Bering Strait
2005	"You Make Lovin' Fun"	Pages

=== Music videos ===
Year	Video	Director
2001	"Jagged Edge of a Broken Heart"	Deaton-Flanigen Productions
2003	"Bearing Straight"	Stephen Shepherd
