= List of Private Passions episodes (1995–1999) =

Private Passions is a 1.5 hour program on BBC Radio 3 where notable guests discuss their musical interests and wider topics. It has been broadcast since 15 April 1995. This article lists guests and their musical choices for the years 1995 to 1999. It does not include repeated episodes or compilations.

== 1995 ==
Date	Guest	Composer	Title
15 Apr 1995	Elvis Costello	Benjamin Britten	Corpus Christi carol (from album Grace)
15 Apr 1995	Elvis Costello	William Byrd	Ye Sacred Muses (rec. 1960)
15 Apr 1995	Elvis Costello	W. A. Mozart	"Parto, ma tu ben mio" (from La clemenza di Tito)
15 Apr 1995	Elvis Costello	Henry Purcell	Fantasia a 4 No. 5 in B♭ Z736
15 Apr 1995	Elvis Costello	Franz Schubert	Piano Sonata movement (incomplete) D 571
15 Apr 1995	Elvis Costello	Igor Stravinsky	March royale (from L'Histoire du soldat)
15 Apr 1995	Elvis Costello	Sigurd von Koch	The Wild Swans
15 Apr 1995	Elvis Costello	Kurt Weill	"My Ship" (from Miles Ahead)
22 Apr 1995	Germaine Greer	Johannes Brahms	Gesang aus Fingal (4 Songs, Op. 17, No. 4)
22 Apr 1995	Germaine Greer	John Cage	Organ Music
22 Apr 1995	Germaine Greer	François Couperin	"L'evaporée" (No. 3 from Pièces de clavecin, book 3, 15th ordre)
22 Apr 1995	Germaine Greer	George Frideric Handel	"Heart, the seat of soft delight" (from Acis and Galatea)
22 Apr 1995	Germaine Greer	Johann von Herbeck	Pueri concinite
22 Apr 1995	Germaine Greer	Jerry Leiber and Mike Stoller	"Is That All There Is?"
22 Apr 1995	Germaine Greer	Gustav Mahler	"Der Tambourg'sell" (from Des Knaben Wunderhorn)
22 Apr 1995	Germaine Greer	Schubert	"Der blinde Knabe" D833
22 Apr 1995	Germaine Greer	Tomás Luis de Victoria	Tenebrae responsories
29 Apr 1995	Simon Russell Beale	Johann Sebastian Bach	Kyrie from Mass in B minor
29 Apr 1995	Simon Russell Beale	Henri Duparc	"Chanson triste"
29 Apr 1995	Simon Russell Beale	Gerald Finzi	"The Salutation" from Dies Natalis
29 Apr 1995	Simon Russell Beale	Claudio Monteverdi	"Quia fecit mihi magna" (from Magnificat, Vespers, 1610)
29 Apr 1995	Simon Russell Beale	Sergei Rachmaninoff	Cello Sonata (3rd movement)
29 Apr 1995	Simon Russell Beale	Maurice Ravel	"Le jardin feerique" (6eme tableau) from Ma mère l'Oye
29 Apr 1995	Simon Russell Beale	Richard Strauss	Finale from Elektra
6 May 1995	Denis Healey	Giacomo Puccini	"In questa reggia" (from Turandot)
6 May 1995	Denis Healey	Mozart	Lacrimosa (from Requiem)
6 May 1995	Denis Healey	Richard Strauss	Trio from act 3 of Der Rosenkavalier
6 May 1995	Denis Healey	Bach	Gigue from Partita No. 1 in B♭ BWV 825
6 May 1995	Denis Healey	Ludwig van Beethoven	Finale of Piano Concerto No. 5 (Emperor)
6 May 1995	Denis Healey	Gioachino Rossini	"Nacqui all'affanno...Non piu mesta" (from La Cenerentola)
6 May 1995	Denis Healey	Schubert	"The Shepherd on the Rock"
6 May 1995	Denis Healey	Beethoven	String Quartet Op. 130 (5th movement, Cavatina)
13 May 1995	Harriet Walter	Bach	Trio Sonata (2nd movement) from The Musical Offering
13 May 1995	Harriet Walter	Beethoven	Symphony No. 5 (1st movement)
13 May 1995	Harriet Walter	Chopin	Nocturne in C♯ minor, Op. 27, No. 1
13 May 1995	Harriet Walter	Edward Elgar	Cello Concerto (2nd movement)
13 May 1995	Harriet Walter	Monteverdi	"Beatus vir" from Selva morale e spirituale
13 May 1995	Harriet Walter	Francis Poulenc	Domine Deus (from Gloria)
13 May 1995	Harriet Walter	Sergei Prokofiev	Death of Tybalt (from Romeo and Juliet)
20 May 1995	Terry Waite	Chopin	Ballade No. 1 in G minor
20 May 1995	Terry Waite	Elgar	Chanson de Matin, Op. 15, No. 2
20 May 1995	Terry Waite	Elgar	The Dream of Gerontius Part II (Prelude, and "I went to sleep")
20 May 1995	Terry Waite	Ivor Gurney	"Sleep"
20 May 1995	Terry Waite	J. M. Nicholas	"Great is he, the Lord eternal", arr. B. Davies
20 May 1995	Terry Waite	Antônio Carlos Jobim and Gene Lees	"Corcovado" ("Quiet Nights of Quiet Stars")
20 May 1995	Terry Waite	Malcolm Boyle	"Thou, O God, are praised in Sion"
20 May 1995	Terry Waite	Krzysztof Penderecki	"Utrenya" (from Part II: The Resurrection of Christ)
20 May 1995	Terry Waite	Peter Melville Smith	Fanfare
27 May 1995	P. D. James	Bach	"Gloria, In terra Pax" (from Mass in B minor)
27 May 1995	P. D. James	Gabriel Fauré	"Agnus Dei" and "Libera Me" (from Requiem)
27 May 1995	P. D. James	Gerald Finzi	"His Golden Locks" (from Farewell to Arms)
27 May 1995	P. D. James	Orlando Gibbons	Psalm 145
27 May 1995	P. D. James	Norman Gimbel and Charles Fox	"Killing Me Softly with His Song"
27 May 1995	P. D. James	Handel	"Dopo notte" (from Ariodante)
27 May 1995	P. D. James	Mozart	"Soave o sia il vento" (from Cosi fan tutte)
27 May 1995	P. D. James	Schubert	An die Musik
3 Jun 1995	Adam Mars-Jones	Bach	Chorale Prelude: O Mensch, bewein dein Sunde gross
3 Jun 1995	Adam Mars-Jones	Don Van Vliet	Hair Pie: Bake 2 (from Trout Mask Replica)
3 Jun 1995	Adam Mars-Jones	Carlo Gesualdo	Dolcissima mia vita
3 Jun 1995	Adam Mars-Jones	Leopold Godowsky	Study No. 27 (on Chopin's Op. 25, No. 2)
3 Jun 1995	Adam Mars-Jones	Arvo Pärt	Mein Weg hat Gipfel und Wellentaler
3 Jun 1995	Adam Mars-Jones	Poulenc	Sicilienne & Carillon (from Suite française (Poulenc))
3 Jun 1995	Adam Mars-Jones	Max Reger	Chorale Prelude: Wachet Auf, Op. 67 No. 41
3 Jun 1995	Adam Mars-Jones	Schubert	Lebenssturme, D947
10 Jun 1995	John Nettles	Beethoven	Symphony No. 6 (Pastoral) Finale
10 Jun 1995	John Nettles	Joseph Canteloube	Bailero (from Songs of the Auvergne)
10 Jun 1995	John Nettles	Joan Baez	"All In Green Went My Love Riding" (from The Joan Baez Lovesong Album)
10 Jun 1995	John Nettles	John Ireland	The Island Spell
10 Jun 1995	John Nettles	Traditional March	The Cornish Troubadour (arr. K. polmear)
10 Jun 1995	John Nettles	Mozart	Clarinet Concerto in A K. 622 (2nd movement)
10 Jun 1995	John Nettles	Shakespeare and Martin Harris	"Under the Greenwood Tree"
10 Jun 1995	John Nettles	William Walton	Charge and Battle Music (from Henry V film score)
17 Jun 1995	Toyah Willcox	Beethoven	Symphony No. 7 in A (2nd movement)
17 Jun 1995	Toyah Willcox	Elgar	Enigma Variations (No. 9, "Nimrod")
17 Jun 1995	Toyah Willcox	Gustav Holst	"Mars" (from The Planets)
17 Jun 1995	Toyah Willcox	Kate Bush	no details
17 Jun 1995	Toyah Willcox	Keith Tippett and Andy Sheppard	No. 32 from 66 Shades of Lipstick
17 Jun 1995	Toyah Willcox	Mozart	Serenade for 13 wind instruments in B♭, K. 361 (2nd movement) (from soundtrack of film Amadeus)
17 Jun 1995	Toyah Willcox	Stravinsky	2 Dances from The Firebird, 1910
24 Jun 1995	John Mortimer	Brahms	Symphony No. 4 in E minor (3rd movement)
24 Jun 1995	John Mortimer	Irving Berlin	"Let's Face the Music and Dance"
24 Jun 1995	John Mortimer	Johann Strauss II	How sad it is (from Die Fledermaus)
24 Jun 1995	John Mortimer	Mozart	Sinfonia concertante in E♭, K. 364 (finale)
24 Jun 1995	John Mortimer	Puccini	"E lucevan le stelle" (Tosca, act 3)
24 Jun 1995	John Mortimer	Richard Strauss	"Beim Schlafengehen"
24 Jun 1995	John Mortimer	Rossini	"Una voce poco fa" (from The Barber of Seville, act 1)
24 Jun 1995	John Mortimer	Giuseppe Verdi	"Dies irae" (from Requiem)
1 Jul 1995	Chad Varah	Bach	Concerto for oboe, violin and strings in C minor, BWV 1060 (2nd movement, Adagio)
1 Jul 1995	Chad Varah	William Byrd	Agnus Dei (from Mass for 4 voices)
1 Jul 1995	Chad Varah	Domenico Scarlatti	Sonata in A minor, Kk54
1 Jul 1995	Chad Varah	Percy Grainger	"Brigg Fair" (arr. for tenor and chorus)
1 Jul 1995	Chad Varah	Handel	Date serta (from motet Silete Venti for soprano and orchestra
1 Jul 1995	Chad Varah	Handel	Dixit Dominus (Psalm 110), HWV 232
1 Jul 1995	Chad Varah	Erik Satie	Gymnopédie No. 1 (orchestration by Debussy)
1 Jul 1995	Chad Varah	Jean Sibelius	"Flickan kom ifran sin" (The maiden's tryst) from Five Songs, Op. 37
1 Jul 1995	Chad Varah	Pyotr Ilyich Tchaikovsky	Concerto for piano and orchestra no. 2 (2nd movement)
8 Jul 1995	Simon Jenkins	Beethoven	Symphony No. 7 in A major, Op. 92 (4th movement)
8 Jul 1995	Simon Jenkins	Dolly Parton	"I Will Always Love You"
8 Jul 1995	Simon Jenkins	Scott Joplin	Elite Syncopations, arr. J. C. Starkey
8 Jul 1995	Simon Jenkins	Mozart	Piano Concerto No. 27 in B♭, K. 595 (2nd movement)
8 Jul 1995	Simon Jenkins	Rossini	Cujus animam gementem, from Stabat Mater
8 Jul 1995	Simon Jenkins	Erik Satie	La Belle Excentrique
8 Jul 1995	Simon Jenkins	Schubert	"Der Hirt auf dem Felsen", D965
8 Jul 1995	Simon Jenkins	Verdi	Excerpt from Rigoletto
15 Jul 1995	Bernice Rubens	Richard Strauss	"Beim Schlafengehen" (from 4 Letzte Lieder)
15 Jul 1995	Bernice Rubens	Schubert	String Quintet in C major, D956 (2nd movement)
15 Jul 1995	Bernice Rubens	Charles Ives	"General William Booth Enters into Heaven" (excerpt)
15 Jul 1995	Bernice Rubens	Antonín Dvořák	Cello Concerto in B minor, 3rd movement
15 Jul 1995	Bernice Rubens	Mozart	"Mi tradi quell'alma ingrata", from act 2 of Don Giovanni
15 Jul 1995	Bernice Rubens	Mozart	String Quartet in C major, K. 365 (Dissonance), 2nd movement
22 Jul 1995	Alastair Morton	Elgar	Cello Concerto in E minor (1st movement)
22 Jul 1995	Alastair Morton	John Matshikiza	Excerpt from King Kong
22 Jul 1995	Alastair Morton	John Rutter	For the beauty of the earth, anthem
22 Jul 1995	Alastair Morton	Spencer Williams	"Basin Street Blues"
22 Jul 1995	Alastair Morton	Stravinsky	Disappearance of the Palace and Kaschkei's Enchantments (from Scene 2 of The Firebird
22 Jul 1995	Alastair Morton	Verdi	"Ah! Veglia, o donna", from act 1, scene 2 of Rigoletto
22 Jul 1995	Alastair Morton	Verdi	"Vedi come il buon vegliardo", septet from Ernani, act 1
29 Jul 1995	Patricia Hodge	Ennio Morricone	"Gabriel's Oboe" (No. 2 from The Mission soundtrack)
29 Jul 1995	Patricia Hodge	Leonard Bernstein	Excerpt from Symphony No. 3 "Kaddish"
29 Jul 1995	Patricia Hodge	Chopin	Polonaise for piano in A♭ major, Op. 53 ("Eroica")
29 Jul 1995	Patricia Hodge	Gabriel Fauré	Libera me (from Requiem, Op. 48)
29 Jul 1995	Patricia Hodge	Mahler	Symphony No. 5 in C♯ minor (4th movement, Adagietto)
29 Jul 1995	Patricia Hodge	Kurt Weill	"Girl of the moment" (from Lady in the Dark)
29 Jul 1995	Patricia Hodge	Charles-Marie Widor	Toccata (from Symphony for Organ, No. 5 in F minor)
5 Aug 1995	Jeremy Isaacs	Beethoven	"O namenlose Freude" (duet) from Fidelio (1814 version), act 2, no. 15
5 Aug 1995	Jeremy Isaacs	Joseph Haydn	Kyrie from Mass in D minor (Missa in angustiis)
5 Aug 1995	Jeremy Isaacs	Leoš Janáček	The Cunning Little Vixen (act 1, prelude)
5 Aug 1995	Jeremy Isaacs	Mozart	Symphony No. 38 in D, K. 504 (Prague), 1st movement
5 Aug 1995	Jeremy Isaacs	Rossini	"Pourquoi ta presence", from William Tell, act 4
5 Aug 1995	Jeremy Isaacs	Schubert	Piano Sonata in B♭ major, D. 960 (1st movement)
12 Aug 1995	Irene Thomas	Captain Arthur C. Green	Sunset (bugle call)
12 Aug 1995	Irene Thomas	Britten	"Moonlight", No. 3 of 4 Sea Interludes from Peter Grimes
12 Aug 1995	Irene Thomas	Charles Gounod	"Avant de quitter" (Cavatina) from act 2 of Faust
12 Aug 1995	Irene Thomas	J. H. Hewitt	"All Quiet Along the Potomac Tonight"
12 Aug 1995	Irene Thomas	Julia Ward Howe	"Battle Hymn of the Republic"
12 Aug 1995	Irene Thomas	Orazio Vecchi	"Fa una canzona" (madrigal)
12 Aug 1995	Irene Thomas	Robert Schumann	Berg und Burgen schaun herunter, No. 7 of Liederkreis, Op. 24
12 Aug 1995	Irene Thomas	Traditional music of Wales	Bugeilio'r gwenith gwyn (Watching the white wheat)
12 Aug 1995	Irene Thomas	Verdi	"Tacea la notte placida", from act 1, scene 2 of Il trovatore
12 Aug 1995	Irene Thomas	Verdi	"Tuba mirum", from Requiem
12 Aug 1995	Irene Thomas	Richard Wagner	"Liebestod" from act 3 of Tristan und Isolde
26 Aug 1995	Albert Roux	Bach	Gigue from Suite for Cello No. 3 in C (BWV 1009)
26 Aug 1995	Albert Roux	Max Bruch	Violin Concerto No. 1 in G minor, Op. 26 (2nd movement)
26 Aug 1995	Albert Roux	Louiguy	"La Vie en rose"
26 Aug 1995	Albert Roux	Jules Massenet	"Si tu veux, mignonne"
26 Aug 1995	Albert Roux	Mozart	Requiem aeternam (from Requiem in D minor, K. 626)
26 Aug 1995	Albert Roux	Puccini	"Nessun dorma" (from Turandot, act 3, scene 1)
26 Aug 1995	Albert Roux	Reynaldo Hahn	"Offrande", No. 8 from 20 Mélodies, book 1
26 Aug 1995	Albert Roux	Camille Saint-Saëns	Danse macabre (symphonic poem)
26 Aug 1995	Albert Roux	Wesley Wilson	"Gimme a Pigfoot"
2 Sep 1995	Leopold David de Rothschild	Hubert Parry	An Ode on the Nativity
2 Sep 1995	Leopold David de Rothschild	Mozart	Menuetto and Trio from Serenade in D major, K. 203
2 Sep 1995	Leopold David de Rothschild	Bach	Prelude and fugue in A major (from Das wohltemperierte Klavier, Bk 2)
2 Sep 1995	Leopold David de Rothschild	Francesco Cavalli	La Calisto
2 Sep 1995	Leopold David de Rothschild	Handel	Concerto grosso in B minor, Op. 6, No. 12 (3rd movement)
2 Sep 1995	Leopold David de Rothschild	Meyerbeer	Rare flower
2 Sep 1995	Leopold David de Rothschild	Mozart	Concerto for piano and orchestra No. 18 in B♭ major, K. 456 (2nd movement)
2 Sep 1995	Leopold David de Rothschild	Gilbert and Sullivan	"The sun, whose rays are all ablaze" (from The Mikado, act 2)
9 Sep 1995	Ian Hislop	Anonymous work	"Ayo visto lo mappamundi" (15th-century Neapolitan barzeletta)
9 Sep 1995	Ian Hislop	Bruckner	Symphony No. 4 in E♭ major ("Romantic") 4th movement
9 Sep 1995	Ian Hislop	Emilio de' Cavalieri	O che nuovo miracolo (ballo from 6th Florentine Intermedio, 1589)
9 Sep 1995	Ian Hislop	Mickey Newbury	An American Trilogy (Dixie/John Brown/All my trials)
9 Sep 1995	Ian Hislop	Mozart	Overture to Le nozze di Figaro, K. 492
9 Sep 1995	Ian Hislop	Giovanni Pierluigi da Palestrina	Hodie Christus natus est: motet for 4 voices
9 Sep 1995	Ian Hislop	Henry Purcell	Crown the altar, deck the shrine, from "Celebrate this festival" (Birthday Ode for Queen Mary, 1693)
9 Sep 1995	Ian Hislop	Tchaikovsky	Serenade for string orchestra in C, Op. 48 (2nd movement, Waltz)
9 Sep 1995	Ian Hislop	William Walton	Spitfire Music/Battle in the Air (from The Battle of Britain Suite)
16 Sep 1995	Dennis Marks	Claude Debussy	Arabesque No. 1 in E major (from Two Arabesques)
16 Sep 1995	Dennis Marks	Leoš Janáček	The Cunning Little Vixen (act 3, final scene)
16 Sep 1995	Dennis Marks	Mahler	"Ich bin der Welt abhanden gekommen" (No. 4 of 5 Ruckert-Lieder for voice and orchestra)
16 Sep 1995	Dennis Marks	Monteverdi	"Laetatus sum", from Vespro della Beata Vergine (1610)
16 Sep 1995	Dennis Marks	Schubert	Trio for piano and strings in E♭ major (Notturno), D. 897
16 Sep 1995	Dennis Marks	Michael Tippett	Interlude and 2nd movement from Concerto for violin, viola, cello and orchestra
23 Sep 1995	Sir Edwin Nixon	Leonard Bernstein	"America" (from West Side Story)
23 Sep 1995	Sir Edwin Nixon	Brahms	Academic Festival Overture, Op. 80
23 Sep 1995	Sir Edwin Nixon	Chopin	Polonaise in A (Military), Op. 40, No. 1
23 Sep 1995	Sir Edwin Nixon	Monteverdi	"Deus in adjutorium meum intende" (Intonation), and "Domine ad adjuvandum", from Vespro della Beata Vergine (1610)
23 Sep 1995	Sir Edwin Nixon	Mozart	Credo from Great Mass in C minor, K. 427
23 Sep 1995	Sir Edwin Nixon	Richard Strauss	Wiegenlied, Op. 41, No. 1, for voice and orchestra
23 Sep 1995	Sir Edwin Nixon	Verdi	"Orfanella il tetto umile...Figlia! A ta nome" (duet from Simon Boccanegra, act 1)
30 Sep 1995	David Hockney	Béla Bartók	Quartet No. 2 (2nd movement Allegro molto capriccioso)
30 Sep 1995	David Hockney	Mozart	Bald prangt, den Morgen zu verkunden (from The Magic Flute)
30 Sep 1995	David Hockney	Ravel	"Five o clock Foxtrot" (from L'enfant et les sortileges)
30 Sep 1995	David Hockney	Richard Strauss	Falcon Aria from act 2 of Die Frau ohne Schatten
30 Sep 1995	David Hockney	Stravinsky	Song of the Nightingale (from Le Rossignol)
30 Sep 1995	David Hockney	Wagner	Prelude to Tristan and Isolde
7 Oct 1995	Bamber Gascoigne	Berlioz	Absence (from les nuits d'ete)
7 Oct 1995	Bamber Gascoigne	Babuji	dheere chalna
7 Oct 1995	Bamber Gascoigne	Verdi	"E grave il sacrifizio" (from La traviata)
7 Oct 1995	Bamber Gascoigne	Mozart	Finale of act 3, The Marriage of Figaro
7 Oct 1995	Bamber Gascoigne	Saverio Mercadante	Overture: La testa di bronzo
7 Oct 1995	Bamber Gascoigne	Stravinsky	Petrushka's Room (from Petrushka)
7 Oct 1995	Bamber Gascoigne	Britten	"The splendour falls" (from Serenade, Op. 31)
14 Oct 1995	David Pountney	Antonín Dvořák	The Devil and Kate (finale of act 1)
14 Oct 1995	David Pountney	George Gershwin	"Just Another Rhumba"
14 Oct 1995	David Pountney	Leoš Janáček	String Quartet No. 1 (Kreutzer Sonata) 1st movement
14 Oct 1995	David Pountney	Maxwell Davies	Resurrection (from Revivalist Rally)
14 Oct 1995	David Pountney	Henry Purcell	"Dance of Fairies"/"Sing while we trip it"/"See, even Night herself is here" (from The Fairy-Queen, act 2)
14 Oct 1995	David Pountney	Schubert	Sonata in A minor D784 (2nd movement Andante)
14 Oct 1995	David Pountney	Shostakovich	Can-can.Ophelia's Ditty/Lullaby (from Hamlet)
21 Oct 1995	Dudley Moore	Bach	Fugue in B minor BWV 544
21 Oct 1995	Dudley Moore	Beethoven	Symphony No. 3 (Eroica), 2nd movement
21 Oct 1995	Dudley Moore	Chopin	Ballade No. 1, Op. 23
21 Oct 1995	Dudley Moore	Mahler	"In diesem Wetter" (from Kindertotenlieder)
21 Oct 1995	Dudley Moore	Massenet	Méditation (from Thaïs)
21 Oct 1995	Dudley Moore	Mozart	Domine Jesu (from Requiem K. 626)
21 Oct 1995	Dudley Moore	Rachmaninoff	Piano Concerto No. 2 in C minor (2nd movement)
21 Oct 1995	Dudley Moore	Weelkes	"When David Heard"
28 Oct 1995	Elizabeth Esteve-Coll	Trad. Sicilian Peasant Songs	Bella Ciao
28 Oct 1995	Elizabeth Esteve-Coll	Trad. Spanish arr. G. Tarrago	El Rossinyol
28 Oct 1995	Elizabeth Esteve-Coll	Mozart	Quintet for piano and wind, K. 452 (Larghetto)
28 Oct 1995	Elizabeth Esteve-Coll	Britten	Sanctus from War Requiem
28 Oct 1995	Elizabeth Esteve-Coll	Camille Saint-Saëns	"Softly awakes my heart" (from Samson and Delilah)
28 Oct 1995	Elizabeth Esteve-Coll	Domenico Scarlatti	Sonata in D major, Kk490
28 Oct 1995	Elizabeth Esteve-Coll	Shostakovich	Violin Concerto (1st movement: Nocturne)
4 Nov 1995	Fiona Shaw	Rachmaninoff	Piano Concerto No. 2 in C minor (1st movement)
4 Nov 1995	Fiona Shaw	Britten	"Adam lay i-bounden" (from A Ceremony of Carols)
4 Nov 1995	Fiona Shaw	Honegger	Joan of Arc at the Stake (scene 7 and part of 8)
4 Nov 1995	Fiona Shaw	John Field	Nocturne No. 7 in C major
4 Nov 1995	Fiona Shaw	John Tavener	The Protecting Veil (opening movement)
4 Nov 1995	Fiona Shaw	Mozart	"Mi tradi quell'alma ingrate" (from act 2 of Don Giovanni)
4 Nov 1995	Fiona Shaw	Mozart	Opening chorus of Requiem
11 Nov 1995	Noel Annan	Bach	Sanctus (from Mass in B minor)
11 Nov 1995	Noel Annan	Mozart	Concerto for flute and harp, K. 299 (2nd movement)
11 Nov 1995	Noel Annan	Henry Purcell	Chaconne (from The Fairy Queen)
11 Nov 1995	Noel Annan	Henry Purcell	"Halcyon Days" (from The Tempest)
11 Nov 1995	Noel Annan	Schubert	"Im Fruhling"
11 Nov 1995	Noel Annan	Tchaikovsky	Eugene Onegin (final scene)
11 Nov 1995	Noel Annan	Kurt Weill	"Surabaya Johnny" (from Happy End)
18 Nov 1995	Jonathan Miller	Bach	"Erbarme dich" (from St Matthew Passion)
18 Nov 1995	Jonathan Miller	Beethoven	Piano Concerto No. 4 (1st movement)
18 Nov 1995	Jonathan Miller	Leoš Janáček	Introduction to The Cunning Little Vixen
18 Nov 1995	Jonathan Miller	Monteverdi	final duet from The Coronation of Poppea
18 Nov 1995	Jonathan Miller	Mozart	"Sull'aria" and "Che soave zeffiretto" (from The Marriage of Figaro)
18 Nov 1995	Jonathan Miller	Schubert	Adagio in E♭ D. 897 (Notturno)
18 Nov 1995	Jonathan Miller	Spencer Williams	"Tishomingo Blues" (rec. 1947)
18 Nov 1995	Jonathan Miller	Traditional music	Rag bilaskhani todi
25 Nov 1995	Charles Rosen	Bach	Prelude and fugue in C minor, BWV 871 (from 'The 48' Book 2)
25 Nov 1995	Charles Rosen	Vincenzo Bellini	O rendetemi la speme (from I Puritani)
25 Nov 1995	Charles Rosen	Elliott Carter	Double Concerto
25 Nov 1995	Charles Rosen	Chopin	Waltz in C♯ minor, Op. 64/2
25 Nov 1995	Charles Rosen	John Browne	Stabat mater
25 Nov 1995	Charles Rosen	Mozart	Di scrivermi ogni giorno (Cosi fan tutte)
25 Nov 1995	Charles Rosen	Wagner	Immolation Scene (from Götterdämmerung)
25 Nov 1995	Charles Rosen	Anton Webern	Eingang (from 5 Songs on poems by Stefan George, Op. 4)
2 Dec 1995	Julian Barnes	Berlioz	Villanelle (from Les nuits d'ete)
2 Dec 1995	Julian Barnes	Georges Brassens	Le 22 septembre
2 Dec 1995	Julian Barnes	Noël Coward	"Don't Let's Be Beastly to the Germans"
2 Dec 1995	Julian Barnes	Gounod	Credo (from St Cecilia Mass)
2 Dec 1995	Julian Barnes	Mozart	Sonata in E♭, K. 282 (1st movement)
2 Dec 1995	Julian Barnes	Ravel	Blues (from Violin Sonata)
2 Dec 1995	Julian Barnes	Erik Satie	Gnossienne No. 4
2 Dec 1995	Julian Barnes	Jean Sibelius	Symphony No. 4 (1st movement)
9 Dec 1995	Marjorie Wallace	Annie Fortescue Harrison	"In the Gloaming"
9 Dec 1995	Marjorie Wallace	Chopin	Waltz in A♭, Op. 69/1
9 Dec 1995	Marjorie Wallace	Elgar	"As torrents in spring"
9 Dec 1995	Marjorie Wallace	Gabriel Fauré	"In paradisum" (from Requiem)
9 Dec 1995	Marjorie Wallace	Gounod	Repentir
9 Dec 1995	Marjorie Wallace	Mahler	Adagietto (from Symphony No. 5)
9 Dec 1995	Marjorie Wallace	Meredith Willson	"Till There Was You" (from Music Man)
9 Dec 1995	Marjorie Wallace	Puccini	recondite armonia (from Tosca)
9 Dec 1995	Marjorie Wallace	Verdi	Finale from La traviata, act 3
16 Dec 1995	John Bird	Bach	Prelude in C♯ major (from The Well-Tempered Clavier, Book 1)
16 Dec 1995	John Bird	Beethoven	Sonata in A, Op. 101 (2nd movement)
16 Dec 1995	John Bird	Boulez	Eclat
16 Dec 1995	John Bird	Claude Debussy	"Étude pour les octaves" (from his Études)
16 Dec 1995	John Bird	Haydn	Quartet in B♭, Op. 76/4 (1st movement)
16 Dec 1995	John Bird	Arnold Schoenberg	3 Pieces for chamber orchestra
16 Dec 1995	John Bird	Arnold Schoenberg	Herzgewachse
16 Dec 1995	John Bird	Robert Schumann	Sphinxes; Papillons (from Carnaval)
16 Dec 1995	John Bird	Stravinsky	Variations – Aldous Huxley in memoriam
23 Dec 1995	Barry Humphries	Emmanuel Chabrier	"L'Île heureuse"
23 Dec 1995	Barry Humphries	Jean-Michel Damase	Variations on the Wedding March
23 Dec 1995	Barry Humphries	Frederick Delius	"Vitae summa" – "They are not long, the weeping and the laughter" (No. 8 from Songs of Sunset)
23 Dec 1995	Barry Humphries	Percy Grainger	"Arrival Platform Humlet", first movement from In a Nutshell
23 Dec 1995	Barry Humphries	Ernst Krenek	"The Farewell Song" (from Jonny spielt auf)
23 Dec 1995	Barry Humphries	Federico Mompou	Damunt de tu nomes les flors
23 Dec 1995	Barry Humphries	Edgard Varèse	Octandre
23 Dec 1995	Barry Humphries	Heitor Villa-Lobos	Samba Classico

== 1996 ==
Date	Guest	Composer	Title
13 Jan 1996	Ken Russell	Brahms	Symphony No. 3 (2nd movement)
13 Jan 1996	Ken Russell	Elgar	Symphony No. 2 in E♭ (3rd movement – Presto)
13 Jan 1996	Ken Russell	Hoagy Carmichael and Johnny Mercer	"Skylark"
13 Jan 1996	Ken Russell	John Adams	Grand Pianola Music Part II; On the Dominant Divide
13 Jan 1996	Ken Russell	Milhaud	Saudades do Brasil (No. 4 Copacabana; No. 5 Ipanema, No. 6 Gavea)
13 Jan 1996	Ken Russell	Sergei Prokofiev	Waltz from War and Peace Symphonic Suite
13 Jan 1996	Ken Russell	Stan Kenton	"Lover" (from Kenton in Hi-Fi)
20 Jan 1996	David Hare	Bach	Goldberg Variations, Nos. 4–8
20 Jan 1996	David Hare	Beethoven	Symphony No. 7 in A (2nd movement)
20 Jan 1996	David Hare	Berlioz	La morte de Cleopatre
20 Jan 1996	David Hare	Mike Figgis	Ben and Sara (theme) (from original soundtrack for Leaving Las Vegas)
20 Jan 1996	David Hare	Miles Davis	"Diner au Motel" (from album Ascenseur pour l'echafaud)
20 Jan 1996	David Hare	Ravel	Tzigane
20 Jan 1996	David Hare	Stanley Myers	Theme from Heading Home
27 Jan 1996	Sian Phillips	Giovanni Battista Pergolesi	Fac ut ardeat cor meum (from Stabat mater)
27 Jan 1996	Sian Phillips	Schubert	Impromptu No. 3 in G♭, Op. 90, D899
27 Jan 1996	Sian Phillips	Leonard Bernstein	"Glitter and be gay" (from Candide)
27 Jan 1996	Sian Phillips	George Gershwin	"Bess, You Is My Woman Now" (from Porgy and Bess)
27 Jan 1996	Sian Phillips	Mozart	"Porgi amor" (from The Marriage of Figaro)
27 Jan 1996	Sian Phillips	Mozart	Piano Concerto No. 19 in F, K. 459 (1st movement)
3 Feb 1996	Sir Isaiah Berlin	Bach	Brandenburg Concerto No. 5 (1st movement, Allegro)
3 Feb 1996	Sir Isaiah Berlin	Beethoven	String Quartet No. 13 in B♭, Op. 130 (5th movement, Adagio molto espressivo)
3 Feb 1996	Sir Isaiah Berlin	Vincenzo Bellini	Casta diva (from Norma)
3 Feb 1996	Sir Isaiah Berlin	Mozart	Act 2 finale from The Marriage of Figaro
3 Feb 1996	Sir Isaiah Berlin	Schubert	Piano Sonata in A, D959
10 Feb 1996	Professor Steve Jones	Richard Strauss	"Da geht er hin, der aufgeblasene schlechte Kerl" (from Der Rosenkavalier, act 1)
10 Feb 1996	Professor Steve Jones	Steve Reich	Tehillim for voice and ensemble (Part II: fast)
10 Feb 1996	Professor Steve Jones	Bach	Chaconne (from Partita for violin No. 2
10 Feb 1996	Professor Steve Jones	Beethoven	String Quartet No. 16 in F, Op. 135 (2nd movement)
10 Feb 1996	Professor Steve Jones	Monteverdi	"Sonata sopra Sancta Maria" (from Vespro della Beata Vergine)
10 Feb 1996	Professor Steve Jones	Henry Purcell	In the midst of life (from Funeral Music for Queen Mary)
10 Feb 1996	Professor Steve Jones	The Ramblers Dance Band	Agyanka Dabre
17 Feb 1996	Patricia Routledge	Bach	Fantasia and Fugue in C minor, BWV 537, Op. 86
17 Feb 1996	Patricia Routledge	Antonín Dvořák	2nd movement (Lento) from 'American' String Quartet No. 12 in F, Op. 96
17 Feb 1996	Patricia Routledge	Gluck	Che faro senza Euridice & Dance of the Blessed Spirits (from Orfeo ed Euridice)
17 Feb 1996	Patricia Routledge	Lennox Berkeley	The Lord is my shepherd, Op. 91 No. 1
17 Feb 1996	Patricia Routledge	Shostakovich	Suite: The Adventures of Korzinkina, Op. 59
17 Feb 1996	Patricia Routledge	Tchaikovsky	Variations on a rococo theme for cello and orchestra, Op. 33 (Vars IV-VII)
24 Feb 1996	Sir Magdi Yacoub	Mozart	Fantasia in C K 395
24 Feb 1996	Sir Magdi Yacoub	Bach	"Ich habe genug" (from Cantata No. 82)
24 Feb 1996	Sir Magdi Yacoub	Mozart	Lacrimosa (from Requiem)
24 Feb 1996	Sir Magdi Yacoub	Handel	"Let the bright seraphim" (from Samson)
24 Feb 1996	Sir Magdi Yacoub	César Franck	Panis angelicus
24 Feb 1996	Sir Magdi Yacoub	Bach	Prelude No. 1 in C (from Well-Tempered Clavier, Book 1)
24 Feb 1996	Sir Magdi Yacoub	Marc-Antoine Charpentier	Te Deum
24 Feb 1996	Sir Magdi Yacoub	Bob Marley	"Three Little Birds"
24 Feb 1996	Sir Magdi Yacoub	Bach	2nd movement from Concerto for 2 violins, BWV 1043
2 Mar 1996	James MacMillan	Bach	Fugue 21 in B♭ (The Well Tempered Clavier, Book 1)
2 Mar 1996	James MacMillan	Beethoven	"O namenlose Freude" (duet from act 2 of Fidelio)
2 Mar 1996	James MacMillan	William Byrd	Mass for 4 voices (Kyrie)
2 Mar 1996	James MacMillan	John Casken	Vaganza (3rd movement)
2 Mar 1996	James MacMillan	Messiaen	Et expecto resurrectionem mortuorem
2 Mar 1996	James MacMillan	Mozart	Clarinet Quintet in A, K. 581 (1st movement)
2 Mar 1996	James MacMillan	Traditional music	MacCrimmon's Lament
2 Mar 1996	James MacMillan	Ustvolskaya	Composition No. 3 (Benedictus qui venit)
2 Mar 1996	James MacMillan	Wagner	Prelude & Opening Scene of Götterdämmerung
9 Mar 1996	Michael Ignatieff	Bach	Italian' Concerto in F, BWV 971 (3rd movement, Presto)
9 Mar 1996	Michael Ignatieff	Beethoven	Piano Concerto No. 4 in G (2nd movement, Andante con moto)
9 Mar 1996	Michael Ignatieff	George Gershwin	"Summertime" (from Porgy and Bess)
9 Mar 1996	Michael Ignatieff	Hoagy Carmichael	"Stardust"
9 Mar 1996	Michael Ignatieff	Mahler	4th movement (Urlicht) from Symphony No. 2 in C minor (Resurrection)
9 Mar 1996	Michael Ignatieff	Arnold Schoenberg	Verklarte Nacht
9 Mar 1996	Michael Ignatieff	Schubert	Trout Quintet in A major (3rd movement – Scherzo)
16 Mar 1996	John Peel	Gregorio Allegri	Miserere
16 Mar 1996	John Peel	Max Bruch	Violin Concerto in G minor, Op. 26 (2nd movement)
16 Mar 1996	John Peel	Conlon Nancarrow	Study for Player-Piano No. 21
16 Mar 1996	John Peel	George Gershwin	Rhapsody in Blue
16 Mar 1996	John Peel	Louis Moreau Gottschalk	Ojos Criollos, Danse cubaine
16 Mar 1996	John Peel	Neil Young	"Rockin' in the Free World"
16 Mar 1996	John Peel	Camille Saint-Saëns	Piano Concerto No. 2 in G minor, Op. 22 (3rd movement – Presto)
23 Mar 1996	Colin Davis	Beethoven	Fugue from Credo (Missa solemnis, Op. 123)
23 Mar 1996	Colin Davis	Berlioz	Les Troyens (act 3 finale)
23 Mar 1996	Colin Davis	Britten	Act 1, scene 2, from Peter Grimes
23 Mar 1996	Colin Davis	Bruckner	Symphony No. 6 in A major (2nd movement)
23 Mar 1996	Colin Davis	Mozart	String Trio in E♭, K. 563 (2nd movement, Adagio)
23 Mar 1996	Colin Davis	Michael Tippett	Act 2, scene 3 from The Midsummer Marriage
30 Mar 1996	Carl Davis	Monteverdi	Messenger's Aria (from L'Orfeo)
30 Mar 1996	Carl Davis	Schubert	Moment Musical in F minor D.780/3
30 Mar 1996	Carl Davis	Mozart	Quintet in G minor, K.516 (3rd movement – Adagio ma non troppo)
30 Mar 1996	Carl Davis	Paul McCartney and Carl Davis	"The world you're coming into" (from Paul McCartney's Liverpool Oratorio)
30 Mar 1996	Carl Davis	Richard Strauss	Wiegenlied Op. 41/1
30 Mar 1996	Carl Davis	Bach	Overture – 1st part (from Suite No. 3 in D)
30 Mar 1996	Carl Davis	Leonard Bernstein	Danzon (3rd Dance Variation from Fancy Free)
30 Mar 1996	Carl Davis	Carl Davis	Pride and Prejudice – Opening Titles
30 Mar 1996	Carl Davis	Puccini	Chi il bel sogno di Doretta (from La Rondine)
30 Mar 1996	Carl Davis	William Walton	Spitfire Music (from Battle of Britain Suite)
6 Apr 1996	Sir David Attenborough	Britten	The Pagodas (from The Prince of the Pagodas, act 2, scene 2)
6 Apr 1996	Sir David Attenborough	Duke Ellington	"Stompy Jones"
6 Apr 1996	Sir David Attenborough	Handel	And the Glory of the Lord (Messiah)
6 Apr 1996	Sir David Attenborough	Mahler	Ich bin der Welt abhanden gekommen
6 Apr 1996	Sir David Attenborough	Monteverdi	1st versicle and response (Vespro della Beata Vergine)
6 Apr 1996	Sir David Attenborough	Mozart	"Soave sia il vento" (Gentle be the breeze) from act 1 of Così fan tutte
6 Apr 1996	Sir David Attenborough	Domenico Scarlatti	Sonata in G major Longo 209
6 Apr 1996	Sir David Attenborough	Thomas Tomkins	When David Heard
13 Apr 1996	Jilly Cooper	Beethoven	Quintet in E♭ (1st movement – Allegro)
13 Apr 1996	Jilly Cooper	Brahms	Hungarian Dance No. 3 in F, arr. Joachim
13 Apr 1996	Jilly Cooper	Britten	Sentimental Sarabande (from Simple Symphony, Op. 4)
13 Apr 1996	Jilly Cooper	Chopin	Andantino (from Fantasia on Polish airs, Op. 13)
13 Apr 1996	Jilly Cooper	Gilbert and Sullivan	"Now, Marco dear" (from The Gondoliers)
13 Apr 1996	Jilly Cooper	Mozart	"Ah! taci, ingiusto core" (from Don Giovanni)
13 Apr 1996	Jilly Cooper	Richard Strauss	Ein Heldenleben (closing section)
13 Apr 1996	Jilly Cooper	Richard Strauss	Night and Sunrise (from Ein Alpensinfonie)
20 Apr 1996	Juliet Stevenson	Schubert	Arpeggione Sonata, D.821 (1st movement – allegro moderato)
20 Apr 1996	Juliet Stevenson	Richard Strauss	"Beim Schlafengehen" (from Four Last Songs)
20 Apr 1996	Juliet Stevenson	Bach	Und von der sechsten Stunde + Wenn ich einmal soll scheiden (from St Matthew Passion)
20 Apr 1996	Juliet Stevenson	Britten	Scene 8 (from The Turn of the Screw, act 1)
20 Apr 1996	Juliet Stevenson	James MacMillan	Sanctus (from Busqueda)
20 Apr 1996	Juliet Stevenson	Leonard Cohen	"Famous Blue Raincoat"
20 Apr 1996	Juliet Stevenson	Mike Reid and Allen Shamblin	"I Can't Make You Love Me"
27 Apr 1996	Simon Callow	Georges Bizet and Oscar Hammerstein II	"De cards don' lie'"/"Dat ol' Boy" (Carmen Jones)
27 Apr 1996	Simon Callow	Cole Porter	"In the Still of the Night"
27 Apr 1996	Simon Callow	John White	Waltz from incidental music to Les Enfants du Paradis
27 Apr 1996	Simon Callow	Kevin Malpass	Music from "Shades"
27 Apr 1996	Simon Callow	Mahler	Symphony No. 8 – final section of part 2
27 Apr 1996	Simon Callow	Mozart	Adagio (Serenade in B♭ K. 361)
27 Apr 1996	Simon Callow	Sergei Prokofiev	2nd movement from Violin Concerto No. 2 in G minor
27 Apr 1996	Simon Callow	Camille Saint-Saëns	"Mon coeur s'ouvre a ta voix" (Samson and Delilah)
4 May 1996	Ernst Gombrich	Mozart	Laudate Dominum (from Vesperae solennes de confessore, K. 339)
4 May 1996	Ernst Gombrich	Mozart	Quartet in B♭ major, K. 458 (3rd movement – Adagio)
4 May 1996	Ernst Gombrich	Haydn	Qui tollis peccata mundi (from the Nelson Mass)
4 May 1996	Ernst Gombrich	Schubert	Piano Sonata in G major, D 894 (3rd movement – Menuetto)
4 May 1996	Ernst Gombrich	Beethoven	Violin Sonata No. 8 in G major, Op. 30/3 (last movement – Allegro vivace)
4 May 1996	Ernst Gombrich	Bach	Violin Concerto in E major, BWV 1042 (2nd movement – Adagio)
4 May 1996	Ernst Gombrich	Beethoven	Quartet No. 13 in B♭ major, Op. 130 (3rd movement – Andante con moto, ma non troppo)
11 May 1996	Joanna Trollope	Britten	Dawn (from Four Sea Interludes from Peter Grimes)
11 May 1996	Joanna Trollope	Gabriel Fauré	In Paradisum (from Requiem)
11 May 1996	Joanna Trollope	George Gershwin	"Summertime" (from Porgy and Bess)
11 May 1996	Joanna Trollope	Górecki	Symphony No. 3 (opening of 3rd movement)
11 May 1996	Joanna Trollope	Mozart	Laudamus te (from Great Mass in C minor, K. 427)
11 May 1996	Joanna Trollope	Rodgers and Hart	"Manhattan"
11 May 1996	Joanna Trollope	Telemann	Concerto in D for three trumpets (1st and 2nd movements)
11 May 1996	Joanna Trollope	Ralph Vaughan Williams	Fantasia on a Theme by Thomas Tallis
18 May 1996	Oz Clarke	Bach	"O Mensch, bewein dein Sünde gross" (from St Matthew Passion)
18 May 1996	Oz Clarke	Jerry Leiber and Mike Stoller	"King Creole"
18 May 1996	Oz Clarke	Puccini	Che gelida manina (from La Bohème)
18 May 1996	Oz Clarke	Henry Purcell	"When I am laid in earth" (from Dido and Aeneas)
18 May 1996	Oz Clarke	Leo Robin and Ralph Rainger	"Thanks for the Memory" (from The Mitford Girls)
18 May 1996	Oz Clarke	Stephen Sondheim	"There was a Barber and his Wife" (from Sweeney Todd)
18 May 1996	Oz Clarke	Stephen Oliver	The Battle of Pelennor Fields (from The Lord of the Rings)
18 May 1996	Oz Clarke	Tom Waits	"The Piano has been drinking (not me)"
18 May 1996	Oz Clarke	Traditional music	"She moved through the fair"
25 May 1996	Anthony Storr	Bach	Menuets I & II from Partita No. 1 in B♭
25 May 1996	Anthony Storr	Chopin	Nouvelles Etudes nos 1 & 2
25 May 1996	Anthony Storr	Duparc	L'invitation au voyage
25 May 1996	Anthony Storr	Handel	Organ Concerto in B♭ major, Op. 4, No. 2 – Allegro (2nd movement)
25 May 1996	Anthony Storr	Haydn	Adagio from Quartet in F minor
25 May 1996	Anthony Storr	Liszt	Unstern-Sinistre
25 May 1996	Anthony Storr	Mozart	4th movement Allegro from String quintet in C
25 May 1996	Anthony Storr	Schubert	Abschied (Schwanengesang D957)
1 Jun 1996	Joe Melia	Beethoven	String Quartet in E♭ major, Op. 127 (3rd movement – Scherzando vivace)
1 Jun 1996	Joe Melia	Britten	Elegy (from Serenade for Tenor, Horn and Strings)
1 Jun 1996	Joe Melia	Liszt	Les Preludes
1 Jun 1996	Joe Melia	Frank Loesser	Overture and Racetrack Trio (from Guys and Dolls)
1 Jun 1996	Joe Melia	Richard Strauss	Moonlight Music (from the last scene of Capriccio)
1 Jun 1996	Joe Melia	Verdi	Falstaff (opening of act 2)
1 Jun 1996	Joe Melia	Wagner	Hagen summons the Gibichung (from Götterdämmerung, act 2)
1 Jun 1996	Joe Melia	Bert Williams and Will Vodery and Jean C. Havez	The Darktown Poker Club
8 Jun 1996	Carmen Callil	Stephen Foster	Ah! may the red rose live alway
8 Jun 1996	Carmen Callil	Richard Strauss	"Beim Schlafengehen" (from Four Last Songs)
8 Jun 1996	Carmen Callil	Schubert	String Quintet in C, D.956 (2nd movement – Adagio)
8 Jun 1996	Carmen Callil	Vincenzo Bellini	Prendi: l'anel ti dono (from La Sonnambula)
8 Jun 1996	Carmen Callil	Denham Harrison and Richard Elton	"Give me a Ticket to Heaven"
8 Jun 1996	Carmen Callil	Jerome Kern	"Can't help loving that man"
8 Jun 1996	Carmen Callil	Traditional music	Tantum Ergo
8 Jun 1996	Carmen Callil	Verdi	"Dio, che nell'alma infondere amor" (from Don Carlo)
15 Jun 1996	Oliver Knussen	Berlioz	Ride to the Abyss (from The Damnation of Faust)
15 Jun 1996	Oliver Knussen	Britten	Apparition of the Spirit (from Curlew River)
15 Jun 1996	Oliver Knussen	Busoni	Berceuse Elegiaque (opening)
15 Jun 1996	Oliver Knussen	Elliott Carter	A celebration of some 100 x 150 notes
15 Jun 1996	Oliver Knussen	Mussorgsky	Opening of act 2 of Boris Godunov
15 Jun 1996	Oliver Knussen	Pérotin	Viderunt Omnes (opening)
15 Jun 1996	Oliver Knussen	Ravel	Valses Nobles et sentimentales (conclusion)
15 Jun 1996	Oliver Knussen	Arnold Schoenberg	Orchestral Interlude from Gurrelieder
15 Jun 1996	Oliver Knussen	Stravinsky	Four Russian Peasant Songs
15 Jun 1996	Oliver Knussen	Stravinsky	Movements for piano and orchestra No. 4
15 Jun 1996	Oliver Knussen	Tchaikovsky	Pas d'action (from The Sleeping Beauty)
22 Jun 1996	Ian McEwan	Britten	Near the Black Mountains there I dwelt (Curlew River)
22 Jun 1996	Ian McEwan	Jonnie Johnson and Keith Richards	Tanqueray
22 Jun 1996	Ian McEwan	Mozart	Adagio ma non troppo (from Quintet for strings in G minor)
22 Jun 1996	Ian McEwan	Henry Purcell	Funeral Sentence – "Man that is born of a woman"
22 Jun 1996	Ian McEwan	Bach	Goldberg Variations – variation 11
22 Jun 1996	Ian McEwan	Wynton Marsalis	"Hesitation"
22 Jun 1996	Ian McEwan	Lennox Berkeley	Sonatina – 2nd movement
22 Jun 1996	Ian McEwan	Bach	3 part invention in C minor
22 Jun 1996	Ian McEwan	Leonard Cohen	"Hallelujah"
29 Jun 1996	Sir Robin Knox-Johnston	Julian Slade	"We said we wouldn't look back from Salad Days"
29 Jun 1996	Sir Robin Knox-Johnston	Handel	Allegro and Hornpipe from Water Music Suite in D major
29 Jun 1996	Sir Robin Knox-Johnston	Rodgers and Hammerstein	"Everything's Up to Date in Kansas City" (from Oklahoma)
29 Jun 1996	Sir Robin Knox-Johnston	Grieg	Excerpt from first movement of Piano Concerto
29 Jun 1996	Sir Robin Knox-Johnston	Tchaikovsky	Fantasy overture Romeo and Juliet
29 Jun 1996	Sir Robin Knox-Johnston	Jean Sibelius	Finlandia
29 Jun 1996	Sir Robin Knox-Johnston	Benny Goodman	"Sing, sing, sing"
29 Jun 1996	Sir Robin Knox-Johnston	Acker Bilk	"Stranger on the Shore"
29 Jun 1996	Sir Robin Knox-Johnston	Gilbert and Sullivan	"Where is the plaintiff", followed by chorus Comes a broken lover from Trial by Jury
6 Jul 1996	David Sylvester	Harrison Birtwistle	Tenebrae (Three Settings of Celan for soprano and 5 instruments)
6 Jul 1996	David Sylvester	Guillaume De Machaut	Gloria (Messe de Notre Dame)
6 Jul 1996	David Sylvester	Henry Purcell	"Hark, each Tree" (Ode on St Cecilia's Day 1692)
6 Jul 1996	David Sylvester	Beethoven	"Mir ist so wunderbar" (Quartet from Fidelio, act 1)
6 Jul 1996	David Sylvester	Chopin	Prelude in E minor
6 Jul 1996	David Sylvester	Bach	Recit: "Die Welt, das Sundenhaus" & Aria: "Wie jammern mich doch die verkehrten Herzen" (Cantata no. 170 "Vergnugte Ruh, Beliebte Seelenlust")
6 Jul 1996	David Sylvester	Bach	Fugue from "The Musical Offering"
14 Sep 1996	Marina Warner	Lewis Allan	"Strange Fruit"
14 Sep 1996	Marina Warner	Antonín Dvořák	Cello Concerto (1st movement)
14 Sep 1996	Marina Warner	John Adams	Night Chorus (from The Death of Klinghoffer)
14 Sep 1996	Marina Warner	John Woolrich	The Turkish Mouse
14 Sep 1996	Marina Warner	Monteverdi	Il combattimento di Tancredi e Clorinda (conclusion)
14 Sep 1996	Marina Warner	Ravel	"Le Jardin Féerique" (from Ma mère l'oye)
14 Sep 1996	Marina Warner	Schubert	Gretchen am Spinnrade
14 Sep 1996	Marina Warner	Stravinsky	Airs by a stream (from L'Histoire du Soldat)
21 Sep 1996	Nigel Rees	John Gay	"Virgins are like the Fair Flower" (from The Beggar's Opera)
21 Sep 1996	Nigel Rees	Haydn	Kyrie (from the Nelson Mass)
21 Sep 1996	Nigel Rees	Felix Mendelssohn	Overture to Victor Hugo's Ruy Blas
21 Sep 1996	Nigel Rees	Mozart	Piano Concerto in D minor, K. 466 (2nd movement – Romance)
21 Sep 1996	Nigel Rees	Rachmaninofff	Prelude in C♯ minor, arr. Wood
21 Sep 1996	Nigel Rees	Alexander Scriabin	Étude in C♯ minor, Op. 2, No. 1
21 Sep 1996	Nigel Rees	Tchaikovsky	Gremin's Aria (from Eugene Onegin, act 3, scene 2)
28 Sep 1996	Tessa Blackstone	Wagner	Prelude to Die Meistersinger
28 Sep 1996	Tessa Blackstone	Stravinsky	The Tresses (Tableau 1 from Les Noces)
28 Sep 1996	Tessa Blackstone	Mozart	Voi che sapete (from Le Nozze di Figaro)
28 Sep 1996	Tessa Blackstone	Tchaikovsky	Waltz (from The Sleeping Beauty, act 1)
28 Sep 1996	Tessa Blackstone	Beethoven	Symphony No. 8 in F, Op. 93 (4th movement – Allegro vivace)
28 Sep 1996	Tessa Blackstone	Jerome Kern	"Pick yourself up"
28 Sep 1996	Tessa Blackstone	Mahler	"Der Abschied" (Das Lied von der Erde)
28 Sep 1996	Tessa Blackstone	Mozart	Violin Concerto No. 3 in G, K.216 (3rd movement – Rondo, allegro)
5 Oct 1996	Craig Raine	Mussorgsky	Ballet of the chicks in their shells (from Pictures at an Exhibition) arr. Yamashita
5 Oct 1996	Craig Raine	Bizet	"Beat out dat rhythm on a drum"
5 Oct 1996	Craig Raine	Handel	"Ev'ry valley shall be exalted" (from Messiah)
5 Oct 1996	Craig Raine	Haydn	Kyrie (from Missa in tempore belli)
5 Oct 1996	Craig Raine	Charles Ives	Memories (Very Pleasant: Rather Sad)
5 Oct 1996	Craig Raine	Mahler	Wenn dein Mütterlein (from Kindertotenlieder)
5 Oct 1996	Craig Raine	Puccini	Tosca (conclusion of act 2)
5 Oct 1996	Craig Raine	Shel Silverstein	Sylvia's Mother
5 Oct 1996	Craig Raine	Stravinsky	Royal March (from The Soldier's Tale)
5 Oct 1996	Craig Raine	Tchaikovsky	Chinese Dance (from The Nutcracker)
12 Oct 1996	George Melly	Cole Porter	"Let's do it"
12 Oct 1996	George Melly	Gilbert and Sullivan	"Take a pair of sparkling eyes" (from The Gondoliers)
12 Oct 1996	George Melly	Edward Heyman and Robert Sour and Frank Eyton and Johnny Green	"Body and Soul"
12 Oct 1996	George Melly	Max Miller	"Here's a funny thing" (from Max at the Met)
12 Oct 1996	George Melly	Ottorino Respighi	Prologue (from The Birds)
12 Oct 1996	George Melly	Erik Satie	"Airs à faire fuir" from Pièces froides
12 Oct 1996	George Melly	Sidney Bechet	Egyptian Fantasy
12 Oct 1996	George Melly	Stravinsky	Danse Sacrale (from The Rite of Spring)
12 Oct 1996	George Melly	William Walton	Popular Song (from Façade Suite)
19 Oct 1996	Paul Bailey	Bach	Nun komm', der Heiden Heiland, BWV 659 arr. Busoni
19 Oct 1996	Paul Bailey	Trad. Arr. Maurice Jacobson	Ca' the yowes arr. Jacobson
19 Oct 1996	Paul Bailey	Alban Berg	Interlude – Invention on a key (D minor) (from Wozzeck)
19 Oct 1996	Paul Bailey	Brahms	Sonata No. 1 in G, Op. 78 (1st movement – Vivace ma non troppo)
19 Oct 1996	Paul Bailey	Leoš Janáček	S Bohem, rodný kraju (from The Diary of one who disappeared)
19 Oct 1996	Paul Bailey	Mozart	Porgi amor (from Le Nozze di Figaro)
19 Oct 1996	Paul Bailey	Schubert	"Der Leiermann" (from Die Winterreise)
19 Oct 1996	Paul Bailey	Verdi	"Dio, che nell' alma infondere amor" (from Don Carlos)
26 Oct 1996	Hermione Lee	Bach	Courante (from Cello Suite No. 3 BWV 1009)
26 Oct 1996	Hermione Lee	Beethoven	Quartet in B♭, Op. 130 (5th movement – Cavatina)
26 Oct 1996	Hermione Lee	Britten	Parade + Départ (from Les illuminations)
26 Oct 1996	Hermione Lee	Haydn	Et Resurrexit (from Theresienmesse)
26 Oct 1996	Hermione Lee	Leoš Janáček	Quartet No. 2 – Intimate Letters (2nd movement – Adagio)
26 Oct 1996	Hermione Lee	Mozart	Cosa mi narri + Sull'aria (from Le Nozze di Figaro)
26 Oct 1996	Hermione Lee	Schubert	Sonata in A, D.959 (2nd movement – Andantino)
26 Oct 1996	Hermione Lee	Verdi	Falstaff (beginning of act 1, scene 2)
2 Nov 1996	Genista McIntosh	Heinrich Ignaz Franz Biber	Sonata & Die liederliche Gesellschaft von allerley Humor (drunken part writing) – 1st 2 movements from Battalia à 10
2 Nov 1996	Genista McIntosh	Mozart	"Laudamus te" (Mass in C minor)
2 Nov 1996	Genista McIntosh	Sergei Prokofiev	1st movement – Piano Concerto No. 1 in D♭, Op. 10
2 Nov 1996	Genista McIntosh	Puccini	"Signore, ascolta ..." (act 1, Turandot)
2 Nov 1996	Genista McIntosh	Rodgers and Hart	"Ten Cents a Dance"
2 Nov 1996	Genista McIntosh	Rossini	Kyrie (Petite Messe Solennelle)
2 Nov 1996	Genista McIntosh	Stravinsky	"(O God, protect dear Tom ...) I go, I go to him" (end of act 1, The Rake's Progress)
2 Nov 1996	Genista McIntosh	Guy Woolfenden	"Come unto these yellow sands" (The Tempest)
9 Nov 1996	Cleo Laine	Carroll Coates	"Love comes and goes"
9 Nov 1996	Cleo Laine	Gabriel Fauré	En Sourdine
9 Nov 1996	Cleo Laine	George Gershwin	"Soon"
9 Nov 1996	Cleo Laine	Robert Herrick and Edward Purcell	"Passing by"
9 Nov 1996	Cleo Laine	Horace Silver	"Ecaroh"
9 Nov 1996	Cleo Laine	John Dankworth	"Sinners Rue"
9 Nov 1996	Cleo Laine	John Rutter	"What sweeter music"
9 Nov 1996	Cleo Laine	Eddie Sauter	Pan
9 Nov 1996	Cleo Laine	Stephen Sondheim	"Not a day goes by" (Symphonic Sondheim)
9 Nov 1996	Cleo Laine	Vivaldi	Spring – 1st movement
16 Nov 1996	Dr. Oliver Sacks	Schubert	Der Müller und der Bach (Die Schöne Müllerin)
16 Nov 1996	Dr. Oliver Sacks	Stravinsky	Infernal Dance & Berceuse (Firebird Suite)
16 Nov 1996	Dr. Oliver Sacks	Mozart	Part of final scene (Don Giovanni)
16 Nov 1996	Dr. Oliver Sacks	Bach	Final chorus (St John Passion)
16 Nov 1996	Dr. Oliver Sacks	Chopin	Mazurka: Op. 7, No. 1, in B♭
16 Nov 1996	Dr. Oliver Sacks	Mozart	Andante – 2nd movement (Sinfonia Concertante in E♭ for violin, viola and orchestra, K. 364)
23 Nov 1996	Sir John Drummond	Alban Berg	"Die Nachtigall" (from Seven Early Songs)
23 Nov 1996	Sir John Drummond	Bortnyansky	Songs of the Cherubim No. 7 (conclusion)
23 Nov 1996	Sir John Drummond	Chopin	Sonata No. 3 in B minor, Op. 58
23 Nov 1996	Sir John Drummond	Haydn	Symphony No. 49 in F minor – "La Passione"
23 Nov 1996	Sir John Drummond	Jerome Kern	"The Way you look Tonight"
23 Nov 1996	Sir John Drummond	Poulenc	"La Reine des Mouettes" (from Métamorphoses)
23 Nov 1996	Sir John Drummond	Percy Bysshe Shelley	"Ode to the West Wind"
23 Nov 1996	Sir John Drummond	Stravinsky	Les Noces (Second tableau)
23 Nov 1996	Sir John Drummond	Verdi	Macbeth/Banquo duet (from Macbeth, act 1, scene 1)
30 Nov 1996	Eleanor Bron	Béla Bartók	Bluebeard's Castle (Doors 4 & 5)
30 Nov 1996	Eleanor Bron	Chopin	Etude in A♭, Op. 25, No. 1
30 Nov 1996	Eleanor Bron	César Franck	Piano quintet (3rd movement)
30 Nov 1996	Eleanor Bron	Gerry Mulligan	Utter Chaos
30 Nov 1996	Eleanor Bron	Poulenc	Villageoises (Petites Pièces enfantines)
30 Nov 1996	Eleanor Bron	Ottorino Respighi	Pines of Rome (movements 1), I pini di Villa Borghese
30 Nov 1996	Eleanor Bron	Schubert	"Im Frühling"
7 Dec 1996	Malcolm Bradbury	Bach	Brandenburg Concerto No. 4 (1st movement – Allegro)
7 Dec 1996	Malcolm Bradbury	Leonard Bernstein	"The best of all possible worlds" (from Candide)
7 Dec 1996	Malcolm Bradbury	Joseph Canteloube	"Baïlèro" (from Chants d'Auvergne)
7 Dec 1996	Malcolm Bradbury	Aaron Copland	Simple Gifts
7 Dec 1996	Malcolm Bradbury	Antonín Dvořák	Serenade for strings (1st movement – Moderato)
7 Dec 1996	Malcolm Bradbury	Michael Nyman	The Disposition of the Linen (from The Draughtsman's Contract)
7 Dec 1996	Malcolm Bradbury	Mozart	Oboe Concerto in C K.314 (1st movement – Allegro aperto)
7 Dec 1996	Malcolm Bradbury	Reicha	Clarinet Quintet Op. 107 (2nd movement – Andante siciliano)
14 Dec 1996	Alan Hollinghurst	Thomas Adès	Maid's Champagne Aria (Powder Her Face)
14 Dec 1996	Alan Hollinghurst	Leoš Janáček	3rd movement, String Quartet No. 2 "Intimate Letters"
14 Dec 1996	Alan Hollinghurst	Mahler	Symphony No. 3 – 1st movement opening
14 Dec 1996	Alan Hollinghurst	Mozart	"E Susanna non vien! ... Dove sono i bei momenti" : (The Marriage of Figaro, act 3)
14 Dec 1996	Alan Hollinghurst	Robert Schumann	Movements from 'Carnival' – "Papillons", "Lettres dansantes", "Chiarina", "Chopin", "Estrella"
14 Dec 1996	Alan Hollinghurst	Ralph Vaughan Williams	Scene 3 – Minuet of the Sons of Job and Their Wives – Job (A Masque for Dancing)
14 Dec 1996	Alan Hollinghurst	Wagner	"O sink hernieder" (Tristan und Isolde, act 2)
21 Dec 1996	Sir Claus Moser	Monteverdi	Deus in adjutorium (from Vespro della Beata Vergine)
21 Dec 1996	Sir Claus Moser	Schubert	Gute Nacht (from Winterreise)
21 Dec 1996	Sir Claus Moser	Schubert	Moment Musical No. 3 in F minor, D 780
21 Dec 1996	Sir Claus Moser	Mozart	Piano Concerto No. 23 in A, K 488 (2nd movement – Adagio)
21 Dec 1996	Sir Claus Moser	Beethoven	Quartet in C, Op. 59/3 (4th movement – Allegro molto)
21 Dec 1996	Sir Claus Moser	Mozart	"Riconosci in quest'amplesso" (from Le nozze di Figaro, act 3)
21 Dec 1996	Sir Claus Moser	Wagner	Wotan's Farewell (from Die Walküre)
21 Dec 1996	Sir Claus Moser	Beethoven	Fuga – Allegro ma non troppo (from Sonata in A♭, Op. 110)
28 Dec 1996	Dame Edna Everage	Henry Bishop	"Home sweet home"
28 Dec 1996	Dame Edna Everage	Carl Davis	Why do we love Australia (from The Last Night of the Poms)
28 Dec 1996	Dame Edna Everage	Charles Williams	The Dream of Olwen
28 Dec 1996	Dame Edna Everage	Percy Grainger	"The Gum-suckers' March" (from In a Nutshell)
28 Dec 1996	Dame Edna Everage	John Antill	"A Rain Dance" (from Corroboree)
28 Dec 1996	Dame Edna Everage	Aram Khachaturian	"Sabre Dance"
28 Dec 1996	Dame Edna Everage	Lehár	"Girls were made to love and kiss" (from Paganini)
28 Dec 1996	Dame Edna Everage	May Brahe	"Bless this house"
28 Dec 1996	Dame Edna Everage	Henry Purcell	"Nymphs and Shepherds"
28 Dec 1996	Dame Edna Everage	Rutland Boughton	"Faery Song" (from The Immortal Hour)
28 Dec 1996	Dame Edna Everage	William Garret James	"Bush Night Song"

== 1997 ==
Date	Guest	Composer	Title
4 Jan 1997	David Malouf	Richard Strauss	Metamorphosen for 23 solo strings (end)
4 Jan 1997	David Malouf	Schubert	Wandrers Nachtlied II
4 Jan 1997	David Malouf	Bach	Fugue No. 24 in B minor, BWV 869 (from The Well-Tempered Clavier)
4 Jan 1997	David Malouf	Chopin	Waltz No. 10 in B minor, Op. 69, No. 2
4 Jan 1997	David Malouf	Haydn	Andante from String Quartet in F minor, Op. 77, No. 2
4 Jan 1997	David Malouf	Mozart	Tutto e tranquillo e placido – Gente, gente, all'armi
5 Apr 1997	Roger Scruton	Bach	Double Concerto in D minor. BWV 1043 (1st movement – Vivace)
5 Apr 1997	Roger Scruton	Samuel Barber	Knoxville: Summer of 1915
5 Apr 1997	Roger Scruton	Alban Berg	Violin Concerto (conclusion)
5 Apr 1997	Roger Scruton	Brahms	Geistliches Wiegenlied, Op. 91/2
5 Apr 1997	Roger Scruton	Leoš Janáček	Sinfonietta (conclusion)
5 Apr 1997	Roger Scruton	Schubert	Symphony no. 9 in C (Trio from the scherzo)
5 Apr 1997	Roger Scruton	Tomás Luis de Victoria	Caligaverunt oculi mei – Si est dolor – O vos omnes (from Tenebrae Responsories)
5 Apr 1997	Roger Scruton	Wagner	Brunnhilde pleads with Wotan (from Die Walkure)
12 Apr 1997	John Tusa	Alexander Vasilyevich Alexandrov	USSR National Anthem (part)
12 Apr 1997	John Tusa	Beethoven	Quartet (Rasumovsky) op. 59 no. 3 – Finale
12 Apr 1997	John Tusa	Antonín Dvořák	Piano Quintet in A, Op. 81
12 Apr 1997	John Tusa	Schubert	Liebesbotschaft (Love's Message) – from Schwanengesang
12 Apr 1997	John Tusa	Schubert	Piano Sonata in B♭, Op. post. D 960, 3rd movement Scherzo (Allegro vivace con delicatezza)
12 Apr 1997	John Tusa	Robert Schumann	Toccata Op. 7
12 Apr 1997	John Tusa	Verdi	"Di quella pira" – (Il trovatore, act 3)
12 Apr 1997	John Tusa	Verdi	Rodrigo's (Marchese di Posa) death scene from Don Carlos (act 4, scene 2)
19 Apr 1997	Lord Armstrong	Bach	Jesu, meine freude BWV 227 (Gute Nacht....)
19 Apr 1997	Lord Armstrong	William Byrd	Justorum animae
19 Apr 1997	Lord Armstrong	Handel	Fugue in C minor (Op. 3, No. 6)
19 Apr 1997	Lord Armstrong	Felix Mendelssohn	Piano trio in C minor (Finale – Allegro appassionato)
19 Apr 1997	Lord Armstrong	Mozart	Quintet for piano and wind K. 452 (2nd movement)
19 Apr 1997	Lord Armstrong	Richard Strauss	Capriccio – Moonlight music from last scene
19 Apr 1997	Lord Armstrong	Ralph Vaughan Williams	A Sea Symphony – Scherzo: The Waves
19 Apr 1997	Lord Armstrong	Peter Warlock	Sleep
26 Apr 1997	Adam Phillips	Boulez	...explosante-fixe...
26 Apr 1997	Adam Phillips	Bob Dylan	"Tangled Up in Blue"
26 Apr 1997	Adam Phillips	Arnold Bax	Nonet
26 Apr 1997	Adam Phillips	Billy Myles	"Have You Ever Loved a Woman"
26 Apr 1997	Adam Phillips	Leoš Janáček	Con moto (1st movement – Quartet no. 1 Kreutzer)
26 Apr 1997	Adam Phillips	Lucinda Williams	"Lines around your eyes"
26 Apr 1997	Adam Phillips	Robert Schumann	Fantasiestuck Op. 12 (Des Abends)
26 Apr 1997	Adam Phillips	Wagner	Prelude to Das Rheingold
26 Apr 1997	Adam Phillips	Anton Webern	5 pieces for orchestra Op. 10
3 May 1997	Siobhan Davies	Bach	Contrapunctus I (from The Art of Fugue)
3 May 1997	Siobhan Davies	Gavin Bryars	Three Elegies for Nine Clarinets (No. 2)
3 May 1997	Siobhan Davies	Gerald Barry	Flamboys (conclusion)
3 May 1997	Siobhan Davies	Handel	Se m'ami, oh caro (from Aci, Galatea e Polifemo)
3 May 1997	Siobhan Davies	Kevin Volans	Third Dance (from White Man Sleeps)
3 May 1997	Siobhan Davies	Domenico Scarlatti	Sonata in B minor
3 May 1997	Siobhan Davies	Steve Reich	Clapping Music
3 May 1997	Siobhan Davies	Stravinsky	Les Noces (conclusion)
10 May 1997	Sir Roy Strong	Elgar	Symphony No. 1
10 May 1997	Sir Roy Strong	Johann Strauss Jr.	Klänge der Heimat – Czardas (from Die Fledermaus)
10 May 1997	Sir Roy Strong	Thomas Morley	"It was a lover and his lass"
10 May 1997	Sir Roy Strong	Sergei Prokofiev	Love Scene (from Romeo and Juliet, act 1)
10 May 1997	Sir Roy Strong	Puccini	Closing quartet (from La bohème, act 3)
10 May 1997	Sir Roy Strong	Henry Purcell	Fairest Isle (from King Arthur)
10 May 1997	Sir Roy Strong	Richard Strauss	Countess's Reverie (from last act of Capriccio)
10 May 1997	Sir Roy Strong	Tchaikovsky	Journey Sequence (from act 2 of The Nutcracker)
17 May 1997	Paul Daniel	Bach	Aus Liebe will mein Heiland sterben (from St Matthew Passion)
17 May 1997	Paul Daniel	Beethoven	Sonata in A♭, Op. 110 (1st movement)
17 May 1997	Paul Daniel	Alban Berg	Act 2, scene 3 (from Wozzeck)
17 May 1997	Paul Daniel	David Bowie	"Fame" (from the Stage album)
17 May 1997	Paul Daniel	Monteverdi	"Possente Spirto" (from L'Orfeo)
17 May 1997	Paul Daniel	Rodgers and Hammerstein	"June is bustin' out all over"
17 May 1997	Paul Daniel	Schubert	Heimliches Lieben
24 May 1997	Peter Shaffer	Felix Mendelssohn	Octet Op. 20 (conclusion of 1st movement) arr. Toscanin
24 May 1997	Peter Shaffer	Shakespeare	Deposition Scene (from Richard II)
24 May 1997	Peter Shaffer	Mozart	Piano Concerto in G, K 453 (3rd movement – Allegretto)
24 May 1997	Peter Shaffer	Verdi	"Si, pel ciel" (from Otello)
24 May 1997	Peter Shaffer	Rossini	"Zitto, zitto: piano, piano" (from La Cenerentola – act 1) Luigi Alva (Don Ramiro) /Renato Capecchi
24 May 1997	Peter Shaffer	Britten	"Since she whom I loved" (from Holy Sonnets of John Donne)
24 May 1997	Peter Shaffer	Handel	"Eternal source of light Divine" (from Ode for the Birthday of Queen Anne)
24 May 1997	Peter Shaffer	Marc Wilkinson	Chant of Resurrection – Final Lament (from The Royal Hunt of the Sun)
24 May 1997	Peter Shaffer	Mozart	Kyrie (from Great Mass in C minor, K. 427)
31 May 1997	Richard Eyre	Bach	Suite No. 1 in G, BWV 1007 (1st & 2nd movements - Prelude & Allemande)
31 May 1997	Richard Eyre	Chuck Berry	School Day
31 May 1997	Richard Eyre	Sam Coslow and Arthur Johnston	My Old Flame
31 May 1997	Richard Eyre	Miles Davis	"So What" (from Kind of Blue)
31 May 1997	Richard Eyre	Mozart	Fantasia in C minor
31 May 1997	Richard Eyre	Arnold Schoenberg	Verklãrte Nacht (conclusion)
31 May 1997	Richard Eyre	Jean Sibelius	Symphony No. 5 (3rd movement – conclusion)
31 May 1997	Richard Eyre	Verdi	"Sanctus" (from Requiem)
7 Jun 1997	Michael Grade	Beethoven	Missa Solemnis (Benedictus – part)
7 Jun 1997	Michael Grade	Billy Strayhorn	"Chelsea Bridge"
7 Jun 1997	Michael Grade	Max Bruch	Kol Nidre
7 Jun 1997	Michael Grade	Richard Strauss	Traum durch die Dämmerung
7 Jun 1997	Michael Grade	Jean Sibelius	Vivacissimo (3rd movement – Symphony no. 2)
7 Jun 1997	Michael Grade	Stephen Sondheim	"The Worst Pies in London" (Sweeney Todd)
7 Jun 1997	Michael Grade	Wagner	Siegfried (end of final scene)
14 Jun 1997	Baroness Warnock	Bach	Sonata in C, BWV 1033 (1st & 2nd movements – Andante & Allegro)
14 Jun 1997	Baroness Warnock	Beethoven	Sonata in D minor, Op. 31/2 (last movement – Allegretto)
14 Jun 1997	Baroness Warnock	Felice and Boudleaux Bryant	"Bye Bye Love"
14 Jun 1997	Baroness Warnock	William Boyce	Symphony No. 8 in D minor (last movement – Tempo di Gavotta)
14 Jun 1997	Baroness Warnock	Henry Purcell	Rejoice in the Lord alway
14 Jun 1997	Baroness Warnock	Schubert	Quartet Movement in C minor, D.703
14 Jun 1997	Baroness Warnock	Traditional music	"Mary Hamilton"
14 Jun 1997	Baroness Warnock	Jan Dismas Zelenka	Second Lamentation for Maundy Thursday
21 Jun 1997	George Walden	Béla Bartók	The Miraculous Mandarin (opening)
21 Jun 1997	George Walden	Ralph Burns and Milton (Shorty) Rogers	Keen and Peachy
21 Jun 1997	George Walden	Mussorgsky	Prelude to Khovanshchina, act 1
21 Jun 1997	George Walden	Henry Purcell	"Man that is born of woman" (from Funeral Music for Queen Mary)
21 Jun 1997	George Walden	Schubert	Sonata in A, D 959 (2nd movement – andantino)
21 Jun 1997	George Walden	Sonny Bono	"The Beat goes on"
21 Jun 1997	George Walden	Stravinsky	The Soldier's Tale (excerpt from part I)
21 Jun 1997	George Walden	Wagner	Träume (from Wesendonck-Lieder)
28 Jun 1997	Sheila Colvin	Antônio Carlos Jobim	A Felicidade
28 Jun 1997	Sheila Colvin	Britten	Fanfare + Villes (from Les Illuminations)
28 Jun 1997	Sheila Colvin	Oliver Knussen	Coursing
28 Jun 1997	Sheila Colvin	Schubert	Pause (from Die Schöne Müllerin, D795)
28 Jun 1997	Sheila Colvin	Tchaikovsky	Symphony No. 5 in E minor, Op. 64 (3rd movement – Waltz)
28 Jun 1997	Sheila Colvin	Verdi	Falstaff – act 1, scene 2
28 Jun 1997	Sheila Colvin	Kurt Weill	"Seeräuber-Jenny" (from Die Dreigroschenoper)
5 Jul 1997	Denis Quilley	Britten	Hymn and Sonnet (from Serenade
5 Jul 1997	Denis Quilley	George Butterworth	Loveliest of trees (from A Shropshire Lad)
5 Jul 1997	Denis Quilley	Claude Debussy	String Quartet (2nd movement – scherzo)
5 Jul 1997	Denis Quilley	Haydn	Symphony No. 88 in G (finale – Allegro con spirito)
5 Jul 1997	Denis Quilley	Lehár	Dein ist mein ganzes Herz from The Land of Smiles)
5 Jul 1997	Denis Quilley	Lehár	Freunde das Leben ist Lebenswirth (from Giuditta)
5 Jul 1997	Denis Quilley	Francis Poulenc	Nocturne No. 1
5 Jul 1997	Denis Quilley	Rodgers and Hammerstein	"What's the use of wonderin'" (from Carousel)
5 Jul 1997	Denis Quilley	Jimmy Van Heusen and Johnny Burke	"Here's That Rainy Day"
12 Jul 1997	Lord Harewood	Beethoven	Slow movement (Symphony no. 9)
12 Jul 1997	Lord Harewood	Britten	Sunday Morning (3rd Sea Interlude – opening of act 2, Peter Grimes)
12 Jul 1997	Lord Harewood	Leoš Janáček	Prelude to Katya Kabanova
12 Jul 1997	Lord Harewood	Sergei Prokofiev	Death of Prince Andrei (Scene XII War & Peace)
12 Jul 1997	Lord Harewood	Arnold Schoenberg	Nun sag ich dir zum ersten Mal (Gurrelieder pt 1)
12 Jul 1997	Lord Harewood	Schubert	Ungeduld (No. 7 of Die Schöne Müllerin) with orchestrated accompaniment
12 Jul 1997	Lord Harewood	Verdi	"Ah! Dite alla giovine" (La traviata, act 3)
12 Jul 1997	Lord Harewood	Wagner	Opening of act 2 (Die Walküre)
13 Sep 1997	Douglas Adams	Bach	Chromatic Fantasia and Fugue in D minor, BWV 903
13 Sep 1997	Douglas Adams	Berlioz	The Shepherd's Farewell (from L'Enfance du Christ)
13 Sep 1997	Douglas Adams	Britten	Rejoice in the Lamb (conclusion)
13 Sep 1997	Douglas Adams	Gary Brooker and Keith Reid	"Holding on"
13 Sep 1997	Douglas Adams	Ligeti	Éjszaka (night)
13 Sep 1997	Douglas Adams	Mozart	Non so piu (from Le Nozze di Figaro)
13 Sep 1997	Douglas Adams	Randy Newman	Glory Train (from Faust)
13 Sep 1997	Douglas Adams	Robbie McIntosh	Gone Dancing
20 Sep 1997	Dame Felicity Lott	Schubert	An die Leier, D 737
20 Sep 1997	Dame Felicity Lott	Richard Strauss	Capriccio (conclusion of Scene 7)
20 Sep 1997	Dame Felicity Lott	Bach	"Have mercy, Lord" (from St Matthew Passion)
20 Sep 1997	Dame Felicity Lott	Brahms	Der Abend, Op. 64/2
20 Sep 1997	Dame Felicity Lott	Handel	Va Tacito (from Giulio Cesare)
20 Sep 1997	Dame Felicity Lott	Jacques Brel	La Chanson des Vieux Amants
20 Sep 1997	Dame Felicity Lott	John Rutter	"The Lord bless you and keep you"
20 Sep 1997	Dame Felicity Lott	Mozart	Serenade in B♭, K. 361 (3rd movement – Adagio)
27 Sep 1997	Sir Georg Solti	Béla Bartók	Concerto for Orchestra (Giuoco delle coppie - movement II)
27 Sep 1997	Sir Georg Solti	Beethoven	Fidelio (Quartet – act 1)
27 Sep 1997	Sir Georg Solti	Mozart	The Marriage of Figaro (Sextet – act 3)
27 Sep 1997	Sir Georg Solti	Richard Strauss	Der Rosenkavalier (Trio – act 3)
27 Sep 1997	Sir Georg Solti	Verdi	Falstaff (final scene)
27 Sep 1997	Sir Georg Solti	Wagner	Die Meistersinger von Nürnberg (Pogner's monologue from act 1)
4 Oct 1997	Ian Craft	Richard Strauss	Love Duet (... "Der Richtiger") (from Arabella, act 2)
4 Oct 1997	Ian Craft	Robert Simpson	Symphony No. 6 (conclusion)
4 Oct 1997	Ian Craft	Shostakovich	Symphony No. 8 (3rd movement – Allegro non troppo)
4 Oct 1997	Ian Craft	Bach	Partita No. 1 in B minor, BWV 1002 (4th movement – Tempo di Borea)
4 Oct 1997	Ian Craft	Beethoven	Fidelio Overture
4 Oct 1997	Ian Craft	John Blow	"Venus!...Adonis!..." (from Venus and Adonis, act 1)
4 Oct 1997	Ian Craft	Bruckner	"Os justi meditabitur"
11 Oct 1997	Andrew Motion	Bach	Suite No. 6 in D, BWV 1012 (1st movement – Prélude)
11 Oct 1997	Andrew Motion	Beethoven	Sonata in B♭, Op. 106 – Hammerklavier (3rd movement)
11 Oct 1997	Andrew Motion	Bob Dylan	"Love minus Zero"
11 Oct 1997	Andrew Motion	Britten	Sonnet (from Serenade)
11 Oct 1997	Andrew Motion	Gluck	Ballet des Ombres Heureuses (from Orphée et Euridice)
11 Oct 1997	Andrew Motion	Haydn	Und Gott schuf grosse Walfische (from The Creation)
11 Oct 1997	Andrew Motion	Laurie Anderson	"Let X=X" (from album Big Science)
11 Oct 1997	Andrew Motion	Steve Reich	Three Movements (2nd movement)
18 Oct 1997	Timothy Garton Ash	Anonymous work	Bogurodzica
18 Oct 1997	Timothy Garton Ash	Beethoven	Violin Concerto in D, Op. 61 (last movement)
18 Oct 1997	Timothy Garton Ash	Britten	Dirge (from Serenade)
18 Oct 1997	Timothy Garton Ash	Mozart	Sinfonia Concertante in E♭, K. 364 (last movement)
18 Oct 1997	Timothy Garton Ash	Peter Fischer	Apfelböck oder die Lilie auf dem Felde
18 Oct 1997	Timothy Garton Ash	Schubert	Erlkönig
18 Oct 1997	Timothy Garton Ash	Bedřich Smetana	Vltava (from Ma Vlast)
25 Oct 1997	Deborah McMillan	Heinrich Ignaz Franz Biber	Prelude, Aria & Variations "The Annunciation' (The Five Joyful Mysteries)
25 Oct 1997	Deborah McMillan	Blossom Dearie	"Et tu Bruce"
25 Oct 1997	Deborah McMillan	Mozart	Lacrimosa (Requiem)
25 Oct 1997	Deborah McMillan	Francis Poulenc	Concerto for Two Pianos and Orchestra – 1st movement
25 Oct 1997	Deborah McMillan	Francis Poulenc	O magnum mysterium (Quartre motets pour le temps de Noel)
25 Oct 1997	Deborah McMillan	Sammy Fain and Jerry Seelen	"I hear the music now"
25 Oct 1997	Deborah McMillan	Arnold Schoenberg	Orchestral Prelude (Gurrelieder)
25 Oct 1997	Deborah McMillan	Schubert	La Pastorella
1 Nov 1997	Edmund White	Brahms	Sonata in F minor, Op. 120/1 (2nd movement)
1 Nov 1997	Edmund White	Britten	Cello Symphony, Op. 68 (2nd movement)
1 Nov 1997	Edmund White	Gabriel Fauré	Berceuse (from Dolly Suite, Op. 56)
1 Nov 1997	Edmund White	María Grever and Stanley Adams	"What a Difference a Day Makes"
1 Nov 1997	Edmund White	Haydn	Symphony No. 45 in F♯ minor – Farewell (4th movement)
1 Nov 1997	Edmund White	Leoš Janáček	Sonata 1. x. 1905 (1st movement)
1 Nov 1997	Edmund White	Monteverdi	"Tornate, o cari baci" (from 7th book of madrigals)
1 Nov 1997	Edmund White	Puccini	"Chi il bel sogno di Doretta" (from La rondine, act 1)
8 Nov 1997	Robert Ponsonby	Albéniz	Triana (Iberia No. V)
8 Nov 1997	Robert Ponsonby	Beethoven	Variation No. 24 'Andante' (33 variations on a Waltz by Anton Diabelli op. 120)
8 Nov 1997	Robert Ponsonby	Brahms	Liebeslieder Waltzes Op. 52 Nos. 1–6
8 Nov 1997	Robert Ponsonby	Leoš Janáček	4th movement (Mladi)
8 Nov 1997	Robert Ponsonby	Mozart	Quartet: "Non ti fidar, o misera" (act 1, Don Giovanni)
8 Nov 1997	Robert Ponsonby	Schubert	Abendbilder
8 Nov 1997	Robert Ponsonby	Stravinsky	Pas de Deux (Divertimento – Le Baiser de la Fée)
8 Nov 1997	Robert Ponsonby	Verdi	End of act 1, scene 1 (Falstaff)
15 Nov 1997	A N Wilson	Shostakovich	2nd movement Allegro (Symphony No. 10)
15 Nov 1997	A N Wilson	Charles Villiers Stanford	Irish Rhapsody No. 4 in A minor, Op. 141
15 Nov 1997	A N Wilson	Richard Strauss	"September" (Four Last Songs)
15 Nov 1997	A N Wilson	Béla Bartók	3rd movement (Viola Concerto
15 Nov 1997	A N Wilson	Beethoven	1st movement Allegretto (Quartet in F op. 135)
15 Nov 1997	A N Wilson	Bruckner	Locus Iste
15 Nov 1997	A N Wilson	Haydn	Quoniam Tu solus sanctus – Gloria (Nelson Mass)
15 Nov 1997	A N Wilson	Mozart	3rd movement Allegretto (Piano Sonata in C K. 330)
22 Nov 1997	György Ligeti	Beethoven	Sonata in C minor, Op. 11 (2nd movement)
22 Nov 1997	György Ligeti	Claude Vivier	"Lonely Child"
22 Nov 1997	György Ligeti	Conlon Nancarrow	Study No, 3a
22 Nov 1997	György Ligeti	Traditional music	Gënding: Dhenggung Turulare
22 Nov 1997	György Ligeti	Traditional music	Piéré
22 Nov 1997	György Ligeti	Traditional music	Whistle Ensemble
29 Nov 1997	Maureen Duffy	Trad. Arr. Harry Burleigh	Deep River (pub. Maecenas Music) arr. Burleigh
29 Nov 1997	Maureen Duffy	Harold Adamson and Jimmy McHugh	"You're a Sweetheart"
29 Nov 1997	Maureen Duffy	William Byrd	Elegy on the death of Thomas Tallis
29 Nov 1997	Maureen Duffy	Handel	Non to basto, consorte + Io t'abbraccio (from Rodelinda)
29 Nov 1997	Maureen Duffy	Mozart	Clarinet Concerto in A, K. 622 (2nd movement – Adagio)
29 Nov 1997	Maureen Duffy	Henry Purcell	Sound the Trumpet (from Come ye Sons of Art)
29 Nov 1997	Maureen Duffy	Henry Purcell	Symphony (from Come ye Sons of Art)
29 Nov 1997	Maureen Duffy	Trad. Arr. Dolly Collins	Six Dukes
6 Dec 1997	Eduardo Paolozzi	Astor Piazzolla	"Songe d'une nuit d'été"
6 Dec 1997	Eduardo Paolozzi	Britten	Opening – Prelude The Emperor (The Prince of the Pagodas)
6 Dec 1997	Eduardo Paolozzi	Count Basie and S. Martin	Miss Thing – part 1
6 Dec 1997	Eduardo Paolozzi	Honegger	Pacific 231
6 Dec 1997	Eduardo Paolozzi	Charles Ives	Central Park in the Dark
6 Dec 1997	Eduardo Paolozzi	Cole Porter and Louis Henneve and Leon Palex	"Vous faites partie de moi" (I've got you under my skin)
6 Dec 1997	Eduardo Paolozzi	Stravinsky	1st part of Bedlam Scene (final act, The Rake's Progress)
6 Dec 1997	Eduardo Paolozzi	Traditional Japanese	n/a
13 Dec 1997	Judith Weir	Trad. Arr. Copper	The Sweet Primeroses arr. Copper
13 Dec 1997	Judith Weir	Bach	Gloria (from Mass in F. BWV 233)
13 Dec 1997	Judith Weir	Brahms	Sextet No. 1 in Bb, Op. 18 (2nd movement)
13 Dec 1997	Judith Weir	Britten	Carol (from Sacred and Profane)
13 Dec 1997	Judith Weir	Kevin Volans	White Man Sleeps (1st movement)
13 Dec 1997	Judith Weir	Carl Loewe	Herr Oluf
13 Dec 1997	Judith Weir	Stravinsky	Oedipus rex (excerpt from act 2)
13 Dec 1997	Judith Weir	Traditional music	Dzil Duet (from Accra, Ghana)
20 Dec 1997	Frederic Raphael	Antônio Carlos Jobim	"Desafinado"
20 Dec 1997	Frederic Raphael	Bach	Goldberg Variations (Theme and Variations 1–3)
20 Dec 1997	Frederic Raphael	Beethoven	Violin Concerto (excerpt from 1st movement)
20 Dec 1997	Frederic Raphael	Haydn	Cello Concerto No. 2 in D (3rd movement)
20 Dec 1997	Frederic Raphael	Marguerite Monnot and Georges Moustaki	Milord
20 Dec 1997	Frederic Raphael	Mozart	Piano Sonata in C minor, K 457 (1st movement)
20 Dec 1997	Frederic Raphael	Robert Schumann	Piano Concerto, Op. 54 (2nd movement)
27 Dec 1997	Manfred Stürmer (A.K.A John Sessions)	Stravinsky	Dance of the Earth (end of Pt 1 – The Rite of Spring
27 Dec 1997	Manfred Stürmer (A.K.A John Sessions)	Brahms	Denn es gehet dem Menschen (No. 1 of 4 Ernste Gesänge op. 121)
27 Dec 1997	Manfred Stürmer (A.K.A John Sessions)	Mahler	fragment from 1st movement Allegro maestoso (Symphony No. 2 in C minor – Resurrection)
27 Dec 1997	Manfred Stürmer (A.K.A John Sessions)	Ned Washington & Leigh Harline	"Give a little whistle"
27 Dec 1997	Manfred Stürmer (A.K.A John Sessions)	Beethoven	Prestissimo (end of 3rd movement – Sonata No. 21 in C, Op. 53 Waldstein)
27 Dec 1997	Manfred Stürmer (A.K.A John Sessions)	Brahms	Andante 3rd movement (Sonata in E♭, Op. 120, No. 2)
27 Dec 1997	Manfred Stürmer (A.K.A John Sessions)	Arnold Schoenberg	Sterne jubeln (from part 1 of Gurrelieder)
27 Dec 1997	Manfred Stürmer (A.K.A John Sessions)	Richard Strauss	closing moments of Salome
27 Dec 1997	Manfred Stürmer (A.K.A John Sessions)	Anton Webern	2nd of 5 Pieces for orchestra op. 10

== 1998 ==
Date	Guest	Composer	Title
3 Jan 1998	Susannah Clapp	Béla Bartók	Bluebeard's Castle (opening)
3 Jan 1998	Susannah Clapp	Beethoven	Sonata in F, Op. 24, "Spring" (1st movement – Allegro)
3 Jan 1998	Susannah Clapp	Moxy Früvous	The King of Spain
3 Jan 1998	Susannah Clapp	Robert Schumann	Romance Op. 94/2
3 Jan 1998	Susannah Clapp	Verdi	"Volta la terrea" (from Un ballo in maschera, act 1)
3 Jan 1998	Susannah Clapp	Kurt Weill	"Alabama Song" (from Mahagonny-Songspiel)
10 Jan 1998	John Fortune	Bunny O'Riley	Dream Land
10 Jan 1998	John Fortune	Domenico Scarlatti	Sonata in A major, Kirkpatrick 208
10 Jan 1998	John Fortune	Domenico Scarlatti	Sonata in E major, Kirkpatrick 381
10 Jan 1998	John Fortune	Haydn	String Quartet in B♭, Op. 76/4, "Sunrise" (3rd movement – Minuet)
10 Jan 1998	John Fortune	Charles Ives	The Unanswered Question
10 Jan 1998	John Fortune	Mugsy Spanier	Relaxin' at the Touro
10 Jan 1998	John Fortune	Alexander Scriabin	Piano Concerto in F♯ minor, Op. 20 (2nd movement – Andante)
17 Jan 1998	Louis de Bernières	Girolamo Frescobaldi	Aria con variazione detta la Frescobalda arr. Segovia
17 Jan 1998	Louis de Bernières	Armando Rodrigues and Affonso Correia Leite	Cançao de Alcipe (from the film Bocage)
17 Jan 1998	Louis de Bernières	Bach	1st movement Allegro (Brandenburg Concerto No. 4 BWV 1049)
17 Jan 1998	Louis de Bernières	Max Bruch	Andante-Allegro (Finale of Concerto for 2 pianos)
17 Jan 1998	Louis de Bernières	Chopin	Prelude No. 4 in E minor
17 Jan 1998	Louis de Bernières	Gounod	Sanctus (Messe Solennelle)
17 Jan 1998	Louis de Bernières	Mikis Theodorakis	"Apagoghi"
17 Jan 1998	Louis de Bernières	Traditional music	Cieliot Lindo
17 Jan 1998	Louis de Bernières	Victor Valencia	Mis Dolencias (Music from the Andes)
24 Jan 1998	Robert Gottlieb	Bizet	Allegro vivace (movement IV, Symphony in C)
24 Jan 1998	Robert Gottlieb	George Gershwin and Ira Gershwin	"A Foggy Day"
24 Jan 1998	Robert Gottlieb	Umberto Giordano	Finale act 4 (Andrea Chénier)
24 Jan 1998	Robert Gottlieb	W. C. Handy	"St Louis Blues"
24 Jan 1998	Robert Gottlieb	Meyerbeer	"O Paradiso" (L'Africana)
24 Jan 1998	Robert Gottlieb	Cole Porter	"Ridin' High" (from Red, Hot & Blue)
24 Jan 1998	Robert Gottlieb	Tchaikovsky	Adagio – from No. 8 Pas d'action (Sleeping Beauty)
31 Jan 1998	Sir Roger Norrington	Bach	"Ich habe genug" (opening aria of Cantata BWV 82)
31 Jan 1998	Sir Roger Norrington	Beethoven	Allegro con brio (1st movement – String Quartet in F minor)
31 Jan 1998	Sir Roger Norrington	Alban Berg	Violin Concerto
31 Jan 1998	Sir Roger Norrington	Berlioz	"Dido's Farewell" (act 5, Les Troyens)
31 Jan 1998	Sir Roger Norrington	William Byrd	Justorum animae
31 Jan 1998	Sir Roger Norrington	Henry Purcell	Chaconne (Dance for Chinese Man & Woman)
31 Jan 1998	Sir Roger Norrington	Heinrich Schütz	Final chorus from St Matthew Passion
7 Feb 1998	Jeremy Sams	Handel	"Oh Thou that tellest..." (Messiah) arr. Cedric Dent
7 Feb 1998	Jeremy Sams	Chabrier	A la musique
7 Feb 1998	Jeremy Sams	Charles Trenet	L'Ame des Poètes
7 Feb 1998	Jeremy Sams	Jonathan Dove	Barbarina Alone (Figures in the Garden)
7 Feb 1998	Jeremy Sams	Lennox Berkeley	Prelude no. 4 (6 Preludes)
7 Feb 1998	Jeremy Sams	Ravel	end of L'enfant et les sortilèges
7 Feb 1998	Jeremy Sams	Schubert	Im Frühling
7 Feb 1998	Jeremy Sams	Stephen Sondheim	"Move On" (Sunday in the Park with George)
7 Feb 1998	Jeremy Sams	Hugo Wolf	"Wir haben beide" (Italienisches Liederbuch)
14 Feb 1998	Claire Tomalin	Schubert	Octet in F, D.803 (2nd movement – Adagio – opening)
14 Feb 1998	Claire Tomalin	Duparc	L'invitation au voyage
14 Feb 1998	Claire Tomalin	Beethoven	Sonata in C minor, Op. 111 (2nd movement – Arietta – conclusion)
14 Feb 1998	Claire Tomalin	Tchaikovsky	Waltz scene (from Eugene Onegin, act 2, scene 1)
14 Feb 1998	Claire Tomalin	Robert Schumann	Zwielicht (from Liederkreis, Op. 39)
14 Feb 1998	Claire Tomalin	Bach	Goldberg Variations (Theme and variations 1–2)
14 Feb 1998	Claire Tomalin	Beethoven	Quartet in E minor, Op. 59/2 (3rd movemenvt – Allegretto)
21 Feb 1998	Lord Winston	Richard Strauss	Dance of the Seven Veils (from Salome)
21 Feb 1998	Lord Winston	Schubert	Piano Trio in B♭, D.898 (3rd movement – Scherzo)
21 Feb 1998	Lord Winston	Rossini	Sextet (from La Cenerentola, act 3)
21 Feb 1998	Lord Winston	Bach	Jauchzet, frohlocket (from Christmas Oratorio)
21 Feb 1998	Lord Winston	Carlo Grossi	Cantata Ebraica in dialogo
21 Feb 1998	Lord Winston	Trad. Arr. Michael Alpert and Alan Bern	Bukovina 212 (pub. Ja/Nein Musikverlag)
21 Feb 1998	Lord Winston	Wagner	Vassal's Drinking Song (from Götterdämmerung)
28 Feb 1998	Edward Said	Bach	Canon at the Ninth (from Goldberg Variations)
28 Feb 1998	Edward Said	Alban Berg	Wozzeck (act 1, scene 1)
28 Feb 1998	Edward Said	Berlioz	Les Troyens (final scene of act 2)
28 Feb 1998	Edward Said	Chopin	Impromptu in F♯, Op. 36
28 Feb 1998	Edward Said	Messiaen	Amen des Anges, des Saints, du Chant des Oiseaux (from Visions de l'Amen)
28 Feb 1998	Edward Said	Robert Schumann	Widmung (from Myrten, Op. 25)
28 Feb 1998	Edward Said	Wagner	Das Rheingold (Prelude)
7 Mar 1998	James Bernard	Britten	Variation of the King of the South (from The Prince of the Pagodas)
7 Mar 1998	James Bernard	Claude Debussy	"Syrinx"
7 Mar 1998	James Bernard	George Gershwin	"Embraceable You"
7 Mar 1998	James Bernard	Lennox Berkeley	Serenade for Strings, Op. 12 (1st movement – Vivace)
7 Mar 1998	James Bernard	Liszt	Les jeux d'eaux à la Villa d'Este (from Années de Pélerinage)
7 Mar 1998	James Bernard	Nellie Lutcher	"Hurry on down"
7 Mar 1998	James Bernard	Sergei Rachmaninoff	Dnes spasenie (from Vespers, Op. 37)
7 Mar 1998	James Bernard	Josef Suk	Love Song, Op. 7/1 (conclusion)
7 Mar 1998	James Bernard	Verdi	Love Duet (from Otello, act 1)
14 Mar 1998	John Sessions	Beethoven	Molto adagio 'A Convalescent's Hymn of Thanksgiving to God, in the Lydian mode' (3rd movement – Quartet in A minor, Op. 132)
14 Mar 1998	John Sessions	Brahms	Close of 2nd movement Andante moderato (Symphony no. 4 in E minor)
14 Mar 1998	John Sessions	Mose Allison	Warhorse
14 Mar 1998	John Sessions	Puccini	part of act 2, scene 2 (Turandot)
14 Mar 1998	John Sessions	Schubert	Im Abendrot
14 Mar 1998	John Sessions	Shostakovich	Andante (2nd movement – Piano Concerto no. 2 in F)
14 Mar 1998	John Sessions	Stravinsky	Overture (Pulcinella)
14 Mar 1998	John Sessions	Wagner	Prelude (Die Walküre)
21 Mar 1998	Anthony Minghella	Puccini	E lucevan le stelle (Tosca)
21 Mar 1998	Anthony Minghella	Irene Higginbotham and Ervin Drake and Dan Fisher	"Good Morning Heartache"
21 Mar 1998	Anthony Minghella	Prince	"Nothing Compares 2 U" (from album I Do Not Want What I Haven't Got)
21 Mar 1998	Anthony Minghella	Egberto Gismonti	Palhaco (Editions Gismoni SUISA)
21 Mar 1998	Anthony Minghella	Bach	Prelude & fugue in C minor (Bk 1 Well-Tempered Clavier)
21 Mar 1998	Anthony Minghella	Vivaldi	Stabat Mater
21 Mar 1998	Anthony Minghella	Van Morrison	"This weight" (from album The Healing Game)
21 Mar 1998	Anthony Minghella	Bach	Prelude (Suite no. 1 in G for solo cello)
28 Mar 1998	Ruth Padel	Bach	Double Concerto in D minor, BWV 1043 (2nd movement – Largo)
28 Mar 1998	Ruth Padel	Beethoven	Quartet in A minor, Op. 132 (1st movement – Assai sostenuto – Allegro)
28 Mar 1998	Ruth Padel	Cole Porter	"Night and Day"
28 Mar 1998	Ruth Padel	Razaf and Belledna	Kitchen Man (pub. Feldman & Co.)
28 Mar 1998	Ruth Padel	Ruth Padel	Indian Red
28 Mar 1998	Ruth Padel	Theodorakis	Arnisi
28 Mar 1998	Ruth Padel	Traditional music	The Bold Irish Boy
28 Mar 1998	Ruth Padel	Verdi	La traviata (conclusion of act 1)
4 Apr 1998	Allan Gurganus	Charles Dibdin	Tom Bowling (pub. Boosey) arr. Britten
4 Apr 1998	Allan Gurganus	Laura Nyro	"I never meant to hurt you"
4 Apr 1998	Allan Gurganus	Mahler	In diesem Wetter (from Kindertotenlieder)
4 Apr 1998	Allan Gurganus	Traditional Arr. Willis Patterson	"My Lord, what a morning2
4 Apr 1998	Allan Gurganus	Gurganus	Plays Well with Others (excerpt)
4 Apr 1998	Allan Gurganus	Doris Tauber and Maceo Pinkard and William Tracey	"Them There Eyes"
4 Apr 1998	Allan Gurganus	Bach	Aria (from Goldberg Variations, BWV 988)
4 Apr 1998	Allan Gurganus	Brahms	Intermezzo, Op. 118/2
4 Apr 1998	Allan Gurganus	Duruflé	Sanctus (from Requiem, Op. 9)
4 Apr 1998	Allan Gurganus	Gurganus	Plays Well with Others (excerpt)
11 Apr 1998	Lady Antonia Fraser	William Byrd	Kyrie (from Mass for Four Voices)
11 Apr 1998	Lady Antonia Fraser	Donizetti	"Ohimè! sorge il tremendo fantasma" ("Mad Scene" from Lucia di Lammermoor, act 2)
11 Apr 1998	Lady Antonia Fraser	Gluck	"Adieu, conservez dans votre âme" (from Iphigénie en Aulide)
11 Apr 1998	Lady Antonia Fraser	Leoš Janáček	The Vixen's Dream (from The Cunning Little Vixen, act 1)
11 Apr 1998	Lady Antonia Fraser	Mozart	"E Susanna non vien!... Dove sono" (from The Marriage of Figaro)
11 Apr 1998	Lady Antonia Fraser	Verdi	"Ascolta! Le porte dell'asil s'apron già...Dio, che nell'alma infondere" ("Brotherhood duet" from Don Carlos, act 2)
11 Apr 1998	Lady Antonia Fraser	Wagner	Siegmund's spring song (from Die Walküre, act 1)
18 Apr 1998	Sir Ian McKellen	Chopin	Polonaise in C minor op. 40, no. 2
18 Apr 1998	Sir Ian McKellen	Elgar and Anthony Payne	Part of 1st movement, Allegro molto maestoso (Symphony no. 3)
18 Apr 1998	Sir Ian McKellen	Frank Loesser	"My Time of Day/I've Never been in love before" (Guys and Dolls)
18 Apr 1998	Sir Ian McKellen	Grieg	Prelude (act 1), Wedding Scene (Peer Gynt)
18 Apr 1998	Sir Ian McKellen	Holst	1st movement (A Moorside Suite)
18 Apr 1998	Sir Ian McKellen	Jule Styne and Stephen Sondheim	Rose's Turn (Gypsy)
18 Apr 1998	Sir Ian McKellen	Stephen Sondheim	"Being Alive" (Company)
25 Apr 1998	Guy Woolfenden	Britten	Elegy (Serenade for tenor, horn and strings op. 31)
25 Apr 1998	Guy Woolfenden	Percy Grainger	Harkstow Grange (2nd movement, A Lincolnshire Posy)
25 Apr 1998	Guy Woolfenden	Henry Purcell	Hear my prayer
25 Apr 1998	Guy Woolfenden	Stephen Sondheim	"Another Hundred People" (Company)
25 Apr 1998	Guy Woolfenden	Michael Tippett	Adagio cantabile (Concerto for double string orchestra)
25 Apr 1998	Guy Woolfenden	Verdi	"Tutto nel mondo è burla" (last scene, Falstaff)
25 Apr 1998	Guy Woolfenden	William Walton	Andante comodo (1st movement – Viola Concerto)
2 May 1998	Barbara Trapido	Alessandro Scarlatti	Già il sole dal Gange (L'Honesta Negli Amori)
2 May 1998	Barbara Trapido	Bach	Aria & Variations 1–5 (Goldberg Variations)
2 May 1998	Barbara Trapido	Britten	Dirge (Serenade op. 31)
2 May 1998	Barbara Trapido	Gluck	Dance of the Blessed Spirits (Orfeo ed Euridice)
2 May 1998	Barbara Trapido	Haydn	Benedictus (Mariazellermesse Missa Cellensis)
2 May 1998	Barbara Trapido	Leopold Mozart	Marche (1st movement Cassatio in G The Toy Symphony)
2 May 1998	Barbara Trapido	Henry Purcell	Come Ye Sons of Art (2nd movement of Ode on the Birthday of Queen Mary, 1694)
2 May 1998	Barbara Trapido	Traditional music	"Nkosi Sikelel' iAfrika"
9 May 1998	Alan Borg	Ligeti	"A Long Sad Tale" (from Nonsense Madrigals)
9 May 1998	Alan Borg	Thomas Linley the younger	"Arise! ye spirits of the storm" (from Music for The Tempest)
9 May 1998	Alan Borg	Henry Purcell	March (from Music for the Funeral of Queen Mary)
9 May 1998	Alan Borg	Wagner	Quintet (from Die Meistersinger von Nürnberg, act 3)
9 May 1998	Alan Borg	Handel	"Scherza infida" (from Ariodante)
9 May 1998	Alan Borg	Beethoven	Symphony No. 5 in C minor, Op. 67 (1st movement – Allegro con brio)
9 May 1998	Alan Borg	Bach	Partita No. 1 in B♭, BWV 825 (1st movement – Praeludium)
9 May 1998	Alan Borg	Beethoven	Grosse Fuge, Op. 133 (conclusion)
16 May 1998	Bernard MacLaverty	Anonymous work	Esposa e Mare de Deu (La Festa o Misteri D'Elx)
16 May 1998	Bernard MacLaverty	Britten	Agnus Dei (Missa Brevis in D)
16 May 1998	Bernard MacLaverty	Leoš Janáček	Allegretto (Sinfonietta)
16 May 1998	Bernard MacLaverty	Mahler	Wenn dein Mütterlein tritt zur Tür herein (Kindertotenlieder)
16 May 1998	Bernard MacLaverty	Messiaen	End of final movement (Turangalila-Symphonie)
16 May 1998	Bernard MacLaverty	Mozart	"Il mio tesoro" (Don Giovanni)
16 May 1998	Bernard MacLaverty	Henry Purcell	"Tis women makes us love"
16 May 1998	Bernard MacLaverty	Schubert	no 2 Andantino (Moments musicaux)
16 May 1998	Bernard MacLaverty	Shostakovich	2nd movement Allegro (Symphony no. 10 in E minor)
23 May 1998	Frances Partridge	Richard Strauss	Metamorphosen (conclusion)
23 May 1998	Frances Partridge	Schubert	Piano Trio in E♭, D.929 (2nd movement)
23 May 1998	Frances Partridge	Bach	Double Concerto in D minor, BWV 1043 (2nd movement – Largo ma non tanto)
23 May 1998	Frances Partridge	Beethoven	Quartet in C♯ minor
23 May 1998	Frances Partridge	Handel	"O sleep, why dost thou leave me" (from Semele)
23 May 1998	Frances Partridge	Monteverdi	"Zefiro torna"
23 May 1998	Frances Partridge	Mozart	Piano Concerto in B♭, K. 238 (1st movement)
23 May 1998	Frances Partridge	Charles Trenet and Raoul Breton	Boum!
30 May 1998	William Boyd	Brahms	Horn Trio in E♭, Op. 40 (1st movement – Andante – poco più animato)
30 May 1998	William Boyd	Brahms	Kanon 13 (from 13 Kanonen, Op. 113)
30 May 1998	William Boyd	Frederick Delius	Violin Sonata No. 3 (1st movement – Slow)
30 May 1998	William Boyd	Gabriel Fauré	Piano Quartet No. 1 in C minor, Op. 15 (3rd movement – Adagio)
30 May 1998	William Boyd	Joseph Schwantner	Percussion Concerto (1st movement – Con forza)
30 May 1998	William Boyd	Sergei Prokofiev	Cello Sonata in C, Op. 119 (2nd movement)
30 May 1998	William Boyd	Stephen Sondheim	"Pretty Women" (from Sweeney Todd)
6 Jun 1998	Binjamin Wilkomirski	Beethoven	Violin Concerto in D: Op. 61 (2nd movement – Larghetto)
6 Jun 1998	Binjamin Wilkomirski	Brahms	Clarinet Quintet in B minor, Op. 115 (1st movement – Allegro)
6 Jun 1998	Binjamin Wilkomirski	Mahler	Symphony No. 1 (2nd movement – Kräftig – excerpt)
6 Jun 1998	Binjamin Wilkomirski	Mozart	"In diesen heil'gen Hallen" (from Die Zauberflöte)
6 Jun 1998	Binjamin Wilkomirski	Trad. Arr. Giora Feidman	Tatei Freilach
6 Jun 1998	Binjamin Wilkomirski	Trad. arr. Jacques Lasry	A Jewish Child of Poland
13 Jun 1998	Deborah Bull	Bach	Chaconne (5th movement, Partita no. 2 in D BWV 1004)
13 Jun 1998	Deborah Bull	Vittorio Monti	Czardas
13 Jun 1998	Deborah Bull	Mozart	"Laudate Dominum" (Vesperae solennes de confessore)
13 Jun 1998	Deborah Bull	Francis Poulenc	Andante con moto (2nd movement, Piano Concerto)
13 Jun 1998	Deborah Bull	Sparre Olsen	Old Village Songs from Lom (nos. 1,4,5,6)
13 Jun 1998	Deborah Bull	Willie Nelson	"Crazy"
20 Jun 1998	Blake Morrison	Blake Morrison	The Ballad of the Yorkshire Ripper (excerpt)
20 Jun 1998	Blake Morrison	Gavin Bryars	Cello Concerto (Farewell to Philosophy) (2nd movement – Più mosso)
20 Jun 1998	Blake Morrison	John Lennon and Paul McCartney	"Fixing a Hole" (from Sgt Pepper)
20 Jun 1998	Blake Morrison	Mahler	"Oft denk' ich, sie sind nur ausgegangen" (from Kindertotenlieder)
20 Jun 1998	Blake Morrison	Miles Davis	"Spanish Key" (opening)
20 Jun 1998	Blake Morrison	Mozart	Rex Tremendae (from Requiem, K. 626)
20 Jun 1998	Blake Morrison	Philip Glass	North Star
20 Jun 1998	Blake Morrison	Rodgers and Hammerstein	"Cock-Eyed Optimist" (from South Pacific)
20 Jun 1998	Blake Morrison	Schubert	Piano Quintet in A, D.667 – "Trout" (3rd movement – Scherzo)
20 Jun 1998	Blake Morrison	Stevie Wonder	"Living for the City"
27 Jun 1998	Sir Anthony Caro	Traditional music	"Early one morning"
27 Jun 1998	Sir Anthony Caro	Stravinsky	"Here I stand" (from The Rake's Progress, act 1)
27 Jun 1998	Sir Anthony Caro	Mozart	Piano Concerto in D minor, K.466 (2nd movement – Romance)
27 Jun 1998	Sir Anthony Caro	Schubert	String Quintet in C, D.956 (conclusion of 2nd movement – Adagio)
27 Jun 1998	Sir Anthony Caro	Brahms	Denn wir habe hie (excerpt from Ein Deutsches Requiem)
27 Jun 1998	Sir Anthony Caro	Haydn	Symphony No. 104 in D – "London" (Finale – spiritoso)
27 Jun 1998	Sir Anthony Caro	Mozart	"Là ci darem la mano" (from Don Giovanni, act 1)
27 Jun 1998	Sir Anthony Caro	Schubert	"Die liebe Farbe" (from Die schöne Müllerin, D.795)
4 Jul 1998	Chris Smith (?)	Antonín Dvořák	Cello Concerto in B minor, Op. 104 (excerpt from 1st movement)
4 Jul 1998	Chris Smith (?)	George Gershwin	"Summertime" (from Porgy and Bess)
4 Jul 1998	Chris Smith (?)	Machaut	Gloria (from Messe de Nostre Dame)
4 Jul 1998	Chris Smith (?)	Mahler	Der Abschied (conclusion) (from Das Lied von der Erde)
4 Jul 1998	Chris Smith (?)	Puccini	Mimì's Farewell (from La bohème, act 3)
4 Jul 1998	Chris Smith (?)	Schubert	String Quintet in C, D.956 (1st movement exposition)
4 Jul 1998	Chris Smith (?)	Jean Sibelius	Symphony No. 2 (excerpt from 3rd movement)
4 Jul 1998	Chris Smith (?)	Kurt Weill	"Ballad of Mack the Knife" (from The Threepenny Opera)
11 Jul 1998	Amanda Holden	Robert Schumann	Study Op. 56/4 (Espressivo) arrangement by Claude Debussy
11 Jul 1998	Amanda Holden	Debussy	Cello Sonata (1st movement – Prologue)
11 Jul 1998	Amanda Holden	Handel	"Tu, preparati a morire" (from Ariodante)
11 Jul 1998	Amanda Holden	Heiner Goebbels	Black on White (2nd movement)
11 Jul 1998	Amanda Holden	Irving Berlin	"You can't get a man with a gun"
11 Jul 1998	Amanda Holden	John Adams	Violin Concerto (3rd movement – Toccare – conclusion)
11 Jul 1998	Amanda Holden	Mozart	Quintet in E♭ for piano and wind (2nd movement – Larghetto)
11 Jul 1998	Amanda Holden	Tchaikovsky	Lensky's Aria (from Eugene Onegin)
18 Jul 1998	Professor Sir Michael Howard	Brahms	Violin Concerto in D, Op. 77 (2nd movement – Adagio)
18 Jul 1998	Professor Sir Michael Howard	Johann Strauss II	Emperor Waltz
18 Jul 1998	Professor Sir Michael Howard	Mozart	"Riconosci in quest'amplesso" (from Le nozze di Figaro, act 3)
18 Jul 1998	Professor Sir Michael Howard	Puccini	Che gelida manina (from La Bohème)
18 Jul 1998	Professor Sir Michael Howard	Rodgers and Hammerstein	"Oklahoma" (from Oklahoma)
18 Jul 1998	Professor Sir Michael Howard	Schubert	Quintet in A – "The Trout" (excerpt from 1st movement – Allegro vivace)
18 Jul 1998	Professor Sir Michael Howard	Charles Trenet	"La Mer"
18 Jul 1998	Professor Sir Michael Howard	Verdi	"Sanctus" (from Requiem)
25 Jul 1998	Corin Redgrave	Beethoven	Allegro (1st movement, violin sonata no. 5 in F "Spring")
25 Jul 1998	Corin Redgrave	Britten	Romance (Variations on a theme of Frank Bridge)
25 Jul 1998	Corin Redgrave	Freddie Mercury	"Bohemian Rhapsody"
25 Jul 1998	Corin Redgrave	Irving Berlin	"I'm beginning to miss you"
25 Jul 1998	Corin Redgrave	Puccini	"Che gelida manina" (act 1, La bohème)
25 Jul 1998	Corin Redgrave	Arnold Schoenberg	No. 1 of Drei Kavierstücke op. 11
25 Jul 1998	Corin Redgrave	Michael Tippett	Lento cantabile (2nd movement String Quartet no. 1)
1 Aug 1998	Lord Gowrie	Thomas Adès	Dolcissimo ed espressivo (The Origin of the Harp)
1 Aug 1998	Lord Gowrie	Alban Berg	Seele, wir bist du schöner (No. 1 of 5 Orchestral Songs Op. 4)
1 Aug 1998	Lord Gowrie	Harrison Birtwistle	The second hunt & temptation (act 2, Gawain)
1 Aug 1998	Lord Gowrie	Brahms	Nachtwache II – Ruhn sie? (no 2 of 5 Gesänge – Lieder und Romanzen op. 104)
1 Aug 1998	Lord Gowrie	Porter Grainger and Everett Robbins	"T'Aint Nobody's Bizness If I Do" (part)
1 Aug 1998	Lord Gowrie	Mozart	Kyrie (Mass in C minor K 427)
1 Aug 1998	Lord Gowrie	Arnold Schoenberg	Adagio (3rd movement, Piano Concerto)
1 Aug 1998	Lord Gowrie	Stravinsky	Part I (Symphony of Psalms)
1 Aug 1998	Lord Gowrie	Verdi	"Solenne in quest'ora" (La forza del destino)
8 Aug 1998	Richard Ingrams	Bach	Widerstehe doch der Sünde (excerpt) (from Cantata, BWV 54)
8 Aug 1998	Richard Ingrams	Brahms	Violin Sonata in A, Op. 100 (1st movement – Allegro amabile)
8 Aug 1998	Richard Ingrams	Frederick Delius	Fennimore and Gerda – Intermezzo
8 Aug 1998	Richard Ingrams	George Gershwin	"Embraceable You"
8 Aug 1998	Richard Ingrams	Mozart	Quintet in D, K.593 (2nd movement – Adagio)
8 Aug 1998	Richard Ingrams	Rachmaninoff	Prelude in G, No. 5 from Preludes, Op. 32
8 Aug 1998	Richard Ingrams	Robert Schumann	Study No. 5 (from Symphonic Studies, Op. posth.)
15 Aug 1998	Jenny Uglow	Schubert	Adagio (part 2nd movement, String Quintet in C D 956)
15 Aug 1998	Jenny Uglow	Haydn	In rosy mantle appears & By Thee with bliss (Part 3, The Creation)
15 Aug 1998	Jenny Uglow	Francis Poulenc	"Laudamus te" (Gloria)
15 Aug 1998	Jenny Uglow	Henry Purcell	"The earth trembled"
15 Aug 1998	Jenny Uglow	Anonymous work	Flying Bomb Kwela (Fire)
15 Aug 1998	Jenny Uglow	Beethoven	Fugue – closing of Sonata in A♭, Op. 110
15 Aug 1998	Jenny Uglow	Bertolt Brecht and Kurt Weill	"Alabama Song" (from Mahagonny-Songspiel)
15 Aug 1998	Jenny Uglow	Handel	Polonaise (4th movement, Concerto Grosso in E minor), Opus 6, number 3)
29 Aug 1998	Michael Birkett, 2nd Baron Birkett	Bernhard Flies	Wiegenlied
29 Aug 1998	Michael Birkett, 2nd Baron Birkett	Chopin	Sonata No. 3 in B minor, Op. 58 (1st movement – Allegro maestoso)
29 Aug 1998	Michael Birkett, 2nd Baron Birkett	Leo Weiner	Serenade, Op. 3 (1st movement – Allegretto)
29 Aug 1998	Michael Birkett, 2nd Baron Birkett	Medtner	Piano Concerto No. 3 in E minor, Op. 60 (excerpt from finale)
29 Aug 1998	Michael Birkett, 2nd Baron Birkett	Mozart	Symphony No. 34 in C, K.338 (Finale – Allegro vivace)
29 Aug 1998	Michael Birkett, 2nd Baron Birkett	Puccini	"Dovunque al mondo" (from Madama Butterfly, act 1)
29 Aug 1998	Michael Birkett, 2nd Baron Birkett	Richard Strauss	Ariadne auf Naxos (end of the prologue)
5 Sep 1998	Michael Dibdin	Britten	Cello Symphony, Op. 68 (2nd movement – Presto inquieto)
5 Sep 1998	Michael Dibdin	Charles Dibdin	Vaudeville (from The Ephesian Matron)
5 Sep 1998	Michael Dibdin	Domenico Scarlatti	Sonata in D, Kk.33
5 Sep 1998	Michael Dibdin	Guillaume Dufay	Quel fronte signorille in paradiso
5 Sep 1998	Michael Dibdin	Mozart	Quartet in G, K.387 (4th movement – Molto Allegro)
5 Sep 1998	Michael Dibdin	Giovanni Pierluigi da Palestrina	Kyrie (from Missa Benedicta es)
5 Sep 1998	Michael Dibdin	Vivaldi	Cum dederit (from Nisi Dominus)
5 Sep 1998	Michael Dibdin	Blind Willie McTell	"Statesboro Blues"
12 Sep 1998	Alan Rusbridger	Valdemar Henrique	Boi-Bumbá arr. Patrick Russ
12 Sep 1998	Alan Rusbridger	Beethoven	Sonata in E, Op. 109 (3rd movement)
12 Sep 1998	Alan Rusbridger	Billy Mayerl	Punch
12 Sep 1998	Alan Rusbridger	Finley Quaye	"Your love gets sweeter"
12 Sep 1998	Alan Rusbridger	George Benjamin	Invention II (from Three Inventions)
12 Sep 1998	Alan Rusbridger	J. H. Maunder	Droop, sacred head (from Olivet to Calvary)
12 Sep 1998	Alan Rusbridger	Wagner	Wotan's Farewell (excerpt) (from Die Walküre, act 3)
12 Sep 1998	Alan Rusbridger	Carl Maria von Weber	Clarinet Quintet in B♭, Op. 34 (3rd movement – Menuetto: Capriccio presto)
19 Sep 1998	Bill Paterson	César Franck	Sonata in A (last movement – Allegretto poco mosso) arr. Delsart
19 Sep 1998	Bill Paterson	Berlioz	"Te Deum", Op. 22 (Tibi Omnes)
19 Sep 1998	Bill Paterson	John Betjeman and Jim Parker (composer)	Eunice
19 Sep 1998	Bill Paterson	Britten	Dawn (from Four Sea Interludes from Peter Grimes)
19 Sep 1998	Bill Paterson	Alfredo Catalani	Ne andrò lontana
19 Sep 1998	Bill Paterson	Schubert	Quartet in D minor, D.810 – "Death and the Maiden" (1st movement – Allegro – opening)
19 Sep 1998	Bill Paterson	Traditional music	Annalese Bain/Phil Cunningham's Reel/Andy Brown's Reel
19 Sep 1998	Bill Paterson	Traditional music	Martyrs
26 Sep 1998	Alan Titchmarsh	Gregorio Allegri	Miserere – opening
26 Sep 1998	Alan Titchmarsh	Bizet	"Au fond du temple saint" (act 1, The Pearl Fishers)
26 Sep 1998	Alan Titchmarsh	Antonín Dvořák	Allegro con brio (1st movement, 8th symphony)
26 Sep 1998	Alan Titchmarsh	Elgar	Opening, 1st movement (Cello Concerto)
26 Sep 1998	Alan Titchmarsh	John Hughes	Cwm Rhondda (Mecolico)
26 Sep 1998	Alan Titchmarsh	Pat Metheny	"Always and Forever"
26 Sep 1998	Alan Titchmarsh	Rachmaninoff	1st movement (Symphony No. 2)
26 Sep 1998	Alan Titchmarsh	Vivaldi	Gloria in excelsis Deo (1st movement, Gloria in D major, RV 589)
3 Oct 1998	The Duke of Kent	Bach	Qui tolllis peccata mundi (Gloria, B Minor Mass)
3 Oct 1998	The Duke of Kent	Chopin	Nocturne in C minor, Opus 48 no. 1
3 Oct 1998	The Duke of Kent	Leoš Janáček	Boris & Kát'a's farewell (from last scene Kát'a Kabanová)
3 Oct 1998	The Duke of Kent	Mozart	Adagio (String Quartet in B♭, K. 458 "The Hunt")
3 Oct 1998	The Duke of Kent	Schubert	Nacht und Träume, D 827
3 Oct 1998	The Duke of Kent	Wagner	End of Dawn Duet & (part of) Siegfried's Rhine Journey (from Prologue, Götterdämmerung)
10 Oct 1998	Gilbert Kaplan	Aaron Copland	Billy the Kid (part of complete ballet)
10 Oct 1998	Gilbert Kaplan	Charles Ives	Fugue: Andante moderato (3rd movement, Symphony no. 4)
10 Oct 1998	Gilbert Kaplan	Mahler	1st movement (part), Symphony no. 7
10 Oct 1998	Gilbert Kaplan	Mahler	End of Finale (Symphony no. 2)
10 Oct 1998	Gilbert Kaplan	Mahler	"Ich bin der Welt abhanden gekommen" (Rückert songs)
10 Oct 1998	Gilbert Kaplan	Mahler	Part of Andante, Symphony no. 6
10 Oct 1998	Gilbert Kaplan	Sergei Prokofiev	Alexander's Entry into Pskov (final movement, Alexander Nevsky, op. 78)
10 Oct 1998	Gilbert Kaplan	Wagner	Final scene, act 3, Der fliegende Holländer
17 Oct 1998	Tom Rosenthal	Bach	Prelude (Cello suite no. 1 in C)
17 Oct 1998	Tom Rosenthal	Beethoven	"O namenlose Freude!" (act 2, Fidelio)
17 Oct 1998	Tom Rosenthal	Berlioz	Chanson d'Hylas (The Trojans)
17 Oct 1998	Tom Rosenthal	Britten	"Now the Great Bear and Pleiades" (act 1, Peter Grimes)
17 Oct 1998	Tom Rosenthal	Manuel de Falla	En los jardines de la Sierra de Córdoba (movement 3 – Nights in the Gardens of Spain)
17 Oct 1998	Tom Rosenthal	Leoš Janáček	Gloria (Glagolitic Mass)
17 Oct 1998	Tom Rosenthal	Richard Strauss	Frühling (4 last songs)
17 Oct 1998	Tom Rosenthal	Tchaikovsky	Duet from act I, The Queen of Spades
17 Oct 1998	Tom Rosenthal	Verdi	"O si per ciel marmoreo giuro" (close of act 2, Otello)
24 Oct 1998	Erich Segal	Bach	Prelude (Cello Suite no. 1 in C)
24 Oct 1998	Erich Segal	Chopin	Waltz in C♯ minor, Op. 64, No. 2
24 Oct 1998	Erich Segal	Gilbert and Sullivan	"When I was a lad" (HMS Pinafore)
24 Oct 1998	Erich Segal	Gluck	"Che faro senza Euridice?" (act 3, Orfeo ed Euridice)
24 Oct 1998	Erich Segal	John Lennon and Paul McCartney	"Let It Be"
24 Oct 1998	Erich Segal	Mozart	Laudate Dominum (Vesperae solennes sde confessore)
24 Oct 1998	Erich Segal	Salamone Rossi	Adon olam
24 Oct 1998	Erich Segal	Shostakovich	Waltz (1st movement, Jazz Suite no. 1)
24 Oct 1998	Erich Segal	Thomas Tallis	Agnus Dei (Mass for Four Voices)
24 Oct 1998	Erich Segal	Kurt Weill and Bertolt Brecht	"Mack the Knife" (from The Threepenny Opera)
31 Oct 1998	Rabbi Julia Neuberger	Salomone De Rossi Ebreo	Baruch haba b'shem Adonai (Les Cantiques de Salomon)
31 Oct 1998	Rabbi Julia Neuberger	Richard Strauss	How engaging, how exciting (Die Fledermaus)
31 Oct 1998	Rabbi Julia Neuberger	Robert Schumann	Ich Grolle Nicht (Dichterliebe)
31 Oct 1998	Rabbi Julia Neuberger	Vincenzo Bellini	Casta Diva (Norma)
31 Oct 1998	Rabbi Julia Neuberger	Fromental Halévy	Eleazar's Song (La Juive)
31 Oct 1998	Rabbi Julia Neuberger	Haydn	Allegretto (Sonata in G minor Hob XVI:44)
31 Oct 1998	Rabbi Julia Neuberger	Haydn	The Heavens are telling (The Creation)
31 Oct 1998	Rabbi Julia Neuberger	Jean-Marie Leclair	Allegro assai – 4th movement (Sonata for flute, viola da gamba & continuo in D major, op. II, no. 8)
31 Oct 1998	Rabbi Julia Neuberger	Irene Higginbotham and Ervin Drake and Dan Fisher	Mine is the Life Song
7 Nov 1998	Christopher Bruce	Barry Guy	Refrain, Chorale & Antiphon (1st section: "After the Rain")
7 Nov 1998	Christopher Bruce	Dave Heath	Celtic Air (from "The Four Elements")
7 Nov 1998	Christopher Bruce	Handel	Act 2 scenes 6 & 7 (Agrippina)
7 Nov 1998	Christopher Bruce	Mahler	"Wenn dein Mütterlein tritt zur Tür herein" (Kindertotenlieder)
7 Nov 1998	Christopher Bruce	Arnold Schoenberg	Moondrunk & Columbine (1st 2 movements: Pierrot Lunaire)
7 Nov 1998	Christopher Bruce	Traditional music	Barbara Allen
7 Nov 1998	Christopher Bruce	Traditional Music Arr. Incantation	Sikuriadas & "Ojos Azules" (Ghost Dances)
14 Nov 1998	Russell Hoban	Villoldo	El Choclo
14 Nov 1998	Russell Hoban	Carl Loewe	Tom der Reimer, op. 135
14 Nov 1998	Russell Hoban	Chopin	Mazurka in A minor op. 67, no. 4
14 Nov 1998	Russell Hoban	Donald Fagen	The Goodbye Look
14 Nov 1998	Russell Hoban	Garbage	I'm only happy when it rains
14 Nov 1998	Russell Hoban	Haydn	In the beginning... & there was light The first day (The Creation)
14 Nov 1998	Russell Hoban	Sonny Terry and Brownie McGhee	"Freight Train"
14 Nov 1998	Russell Hoban	Monk	"Round about Midnight"
14 Nov 1998	Russell Hoban	Schubert	"Der Leiermann" (from Winterreise)
21 Nov 1998	Marina Mahler	Luigi Nono	3 voci (Prometeo Suite 1992)
21 Nov 1998	Marina Mahler	Wagner	Part of end of act 1 (Parsifal)
21 Nov 1998	Marina Mahler	Bach	Prelude No. 4 in C♯ minor
21 Nov 1998	Marina Mahler	Bach	Prelude No. 8 in E♭ minor
21 Nov 1998	Marina Mahler	Bach	2nd movement (Partita No. 4)
28 Nov 1998	Clive Swift	Gabriel Fauré	Mi-a-o ('Dolly' Suite op. 56), arr. Bream
28 Nov 1998	Clive Swift	Berlioz	Le Repos de la Sainte Famille (L'Enfance du Christ)
28 Nov 1998	Clive Swift	Chopin	Allegro maestoso (1st movement, Sonata in B minor, op. 58)
28 Nov 1998	Clive Swift	Eric Coates	Calling all workers
28 Nov 1998	Clive Swift	Eric Ball	Journey into Freedom
28 Nov 1998	Clive Swift	Richard Strauss	The Dinner (Le Bourgeois Gentilhomme Suite op. 60)
28 Nov 1998	Clive Swift	Traditional music	Kol Nidrei
5 Dec 1998	Gillian Moore	Burt Bacharach	"Say a little prayer"
5 Dec 1998	Gillian Moore	Harrison Birtwistle	Mark of Orpheus
5 Dec 1998	Gillian Moore	Duke Ellington	"Thanks for the beautiful land on the delta" (New Orleans Suite)
5 Dec 1998	Gillian Moore	Ligeti	Movimento preciso e meccanico (3rd movement, Chamber Concerto)
5 Dec 1998	Gillian Moore	Henry Purcell	The Frost Scene (act 3, King Arthur)
5 Dec 1998	Gillian Moore	Traditional music	Tamuke (offering) for Shakuhachi
5 Dec 1998	Gillian Moore	Turnage: Blood on the Floor	Junior Addict
12 Dec 1998	Armando Iannucci	Bach	Adagio – 1st movement, Sonata no. 1 in G minor, BWV 1001, for solo violin
12 Dec 1998	Armando Iannucci	Alban Berg	Adagio (finale of Violin Concerto)
12 Dec 1998	Armando Iannucci	John Adams	3rd movement, 1st half 'Wild Nights' – Harmonium
12 Dec 1998	Armando Iannucci	Jerry Leiber and Mike Stoller	"Is that all there is?"
12 Dec 1998	Armando Iannucci	Carl Nielsen	Symphony No. 5 (1st movement)
12 Dec 1998	Armando Iannucci	P. D. Q. Bach	Madrigal "My bonnie lass she smelleth" (The Triumphs of Thusnelda)
12 Dec 1998	Armando Iannucci	Michael Tippett	"How can I cherish my man" & "Steal Away" (A Child of our Time)
19 Dec 1998	Robert Craft	Stravinsky	3 Japanese Lyrics
19 Dec 1998	Robert Craft	Stravinsky	Sektanskaya
19 Dec 1998	Robert Craft	Mozart	Serenade in B♭, K. 361 (finale)
19 Dec 1998	Robert Craft	Beethoven	Symphony No. 5 in C minor, Op. 67 (1st movement – Allegro con brio)
19 Dec 1998	Robert Craft	François Couperin	Incipit Lamentatio + Quomodo sedet (from Leçons des Ténèbres)
19 Dec 1998	Robert Craft	Lassus	Kyrie (from Missa Osculetur me)
19 Dec 1998	Robert Craft	Mozart	Qui Tollis (from Mass in C minor, K.427)
19 Dec 1998	Robert Craft	Stravinsky	Les Noces (1st tableau)
26 Dec 1998	Lady Pilar Woffington (Aka John Sessions)	Hunter/Garcia	Attics of my life
26 Dec 1998	Lady Pilar Woffington (Aka John Sessions)	J. J. Cale	Cocaine
26 Dec 1998	Lady Pilar Woffington (Aka John Sessions)	Wagner	End of Overture (The Flying Dutchman)
26 Dec 1998	Lady Pilar Woffington (Aka John Sessions)	Puccini	Introduction (La Fanciulla del West)
26 Dec 1998	Lady Pilar Woffington (Aka John Sessions)	Manuel De Falla	Ritual Fire Dance (El amor brujo)
26 Dec 1998	Lady Pilar Woffington (Aka John Sessions)	Heitor Villa-Lobos	Aria (part) (Bachianas Brasileiras No. 5)
26 Dec 1998	Lady Pilar Woffington (Aka John Sessions)	Puccini	End of act 2 (Tosca)

== 1999 ==
Date	Guest	Composer	Title
2 Jan 1999	Brian Rix	Gene Roland	Exit Stage Left
2 Jan 1999	Brian Rix	Gilbert and Sullivan	Painted Emblems + Ghosts' High Noon (from Ruddigore)
2 Jan 1999	Brian Rix	Jerome Kern	"Ol' Man River" (from Showboat)
2 Jan 1999	Brian Rix	Mahler	Symphony No. 3 (opening)
2 Jan 1999	Brian Rix	Tchaikovsky	Andante Cantabile, Op. 11
2 Jan 1999	Brian Rix	Tommy Watt	Crumpets for the Count
2 Jan 1999	Brian Rix	Walter Donaldson	"Makin' Whoopee"
2 Jan 1999	Brian Rix	Gheorghe Zamfir	Doina de Jale
9 Jan 1999	Gita Mehta	Haydn	(Allegro 1st movement) String Quartet in B♭ major, Op. 76, No. 4
9 Jan 1999	Gita Mehta	Jayadeva	Gita Govinda (scene II)
9 Jan 1999	Gita Mehta	Teré Biné	Gita Mehta
9 Jan 1999	Gita Mehta	Traditional music	Raga Lathangi
9 Jan 1999	Gita Mehta	Nina Simone	"Sugar in my bowl"
9 Jan 1999	Gita Mehta	Traditional music	Raga Sindhu Bhairati
9 Jan 1999	Gita Mehta	Traditional music	Raga Yaman
9 Jan 1999	Gita Mehta	Traditional music	Raga Yaman
16 Jan 1999	John Burningham	Rossini	Una voce poco fa (Barber of Seville)
16 Jan 1999	John Burningham	Schubert	Erlkonig S557a arr. Liszt
16 Jan 1999	John Burningham	Richard Strauss	"Night, Sunrise, The Ascent" (opening – An Alpine Symphony)
16 Jan 1999	John Burningham	Bach	Prelude (3rd Suite for cello in C BWV 1009)
16 Jan 1999	John Burningham	Consuelo Velázquez	Besame mucho
16 Jan 1999	John Burningham	Stefano Donaudy	O del mio amato ben
16 Jan 1999	John Burningham	La Rocca and Larry Shields	"At the jazz band ball"
16 Jan 1999	John Burningham	Mozart	"Deh! vieni all finestra" (act 2, Don Giovanni)
16 Jan 1999	John Burningham	Dino Olivieri and Louis Poterat	"J'attendrai"
16 Jan 1999	John Burningham	Traditional music	The Coolin
23 Jan 1999	John Fuller	Lutyens	"As I walked out one evening"
23 Jan 1999	John Fuller	John Fuller	Concerto for Double Bass
23 Jan 1999	John Fuller	Sergei Prokofiev	Piano Concerto No. 4 in B♭, Op. 53 (1st movement – Vivace)
23 Jan 1999	John Fuller	Shostakovich	String Quartet No. 8 in C minor, Op. 110 (4th movement – Largo)
23 Jan 1999	John Fuller	John Fuller	Trio
23 Jan 1999	John Fuller	Francis Poulenc	Trio (1st movement – Presto)
23 Jan 1999	John Fuller	Stravinsky	Violin Concerto (3rd movement – Aria II)
23 Jan 1999	John Fuller	Karol Szymanowski	Violin Concerto No. 2, Op. 61 (3rd movement – Andantino)
23 Jan 1999	John Fuller	Bill Russo	Gazelle
23 Jan 1999	John Fuller	Britten	"Calypso" (from Cabaret Songs)
30 Jan 1999	Tom Phillips	Bach	Final chorus (St Matthew Passion)
30 Jan 1999	Tom Phillips	Harrison Birtwistle	Part of 1st & 2nd Lullabyes (Gawain)
30 Jan 1999	Tom Phillips	Brahms	Denn alles Fleisch es ist wie Gras (Ein Deutsches Requiem)
30 Jan 1999	Tom Phillips	John Cage	Sonata 1 (Sonatas & Interludes)
30 Jan 1999	Tom Phillips	Antonín Dvořák	String quartet in F, Op. 96 (American)
30 Jan 1999	Tom Phillips	Terry Riley	In C
30 Jan 1999	Tom Phillips	Norbert Schultze and Hans Leip	Lili Marlene
30 Jan 1999	Tom Phillips	Verdi	End of act 3 (Otello)
30 Jan 1999	Tom Phillips	Wagner	(Siegfried recalling the woodbird's song, just before he is killed – act 3, scene 2, Götterdämmerung)
6 Feb 1999	Sir Humphrey Maud	Bach	Bourrées I & II (Suite no. 3 in C major BWV 1009)
6 Feb 1999	Sir Humphrey Maud	Benny Davis and Abner Silver	"Chasing Shadows" rec. 1935
6 Feb 1999	Sir Humphrey Maud	Mozart	Allegro (1st movement, String Quintet in G minor, KV 516)
6 Feb 1999	Sir Humphrey Maud	Pärt	Cantus in Memory of Benjamin Britten
6 Feb 1999	Sir Humphrey Maud	Astor Piazzolla	Milonga in D
6 Feb 1999	Sir Humphrey Maud	Henry Purcell	Fantasia No. 1
6 Feb 1999	Sir Humphrey Maud	Schubert	Andante (2nd movement, sonata in A D 664)
6 Feb 1999	Sir Humphrey Maud	Bessie Smith and Stuart Balcom	"You've been a good ole wagon" – rec. 1925
13 Feb 1999	Jo Shapcott	John Adams	Hoe-down (Mad Cow) (from Gnarly Buttons)
13 Feb 1999	Jo Shapcott	Bach	Canon circularis per tonos (from Musical Offering, BWV 1079)
13 Feb 1999	Jo Shapcott	Britten	Hymn to St Cecilia (first part)
13 Feb 1999	Jo Shapcott	Gerald Finzi	"Wonder" (from Dies Natalis)
13 Feb 1999	Jo Shapcott	James MacMillan	Tryst (opening)
13 Feb 1999	Jo Shapcott	Jo Shapcott	"My Life asleep"
13 Feb 1999	Jo Shapcott	Jo Shapcott	The Mad Cow talks back
13 Feb 1999	Jo Shapcott	Keith Jarrett	"My Song"
13 Feb 1999	Jo Shapcott	Sergei Prokofiev	Sonata No. 2 in D minor, Op. 14 (last movement – Vivace)
13 Feb 1999	Jo Shapcott	Traditional music	Bubaran Hudan Mas
13 Feb 1999	Jo Shapcott	Traditional music	Torre del Viento
20 Feb 1999	Bernard Williams	Bach	Sarabande & Bourrée (English Suite no. 1 in A major BQV 806)
20 Feb 1999	Bernard Williams	Alban Berg	Altenberglieder
20 Feb 1999	Bernard Williams	Claude Debussy	Act 2, scene 1 (Pelléas et Mélisande)
20 Feb 1999	Bernard Williams	Elgar	"Repent and be baptized" (end of part 3, The Kingdom)
20 Feb 1999	Bernard Williams	Mozart	Rondeau: Allegro (3rd movement, Duo No. 1, K. 423)
20 Feb 1999	Bernard Williams	Richard Strauss	Zueignung (no 1-8 songs, Op. 10)
27 Feb 1999	Philip Hensher	Thomas Adès	Fancy Aria (from Powder Her Face, act 1)
27 Feb 1999	Philip Hensher	Busoni	Sonatina No. 1
27 Feb 1999	Philip Hensher	Fat Boy Slim	"Praise You"
27 Feb 1999	Philip Hensher	Nørgard	Symphony No. 2 (conclusion)
27 Feb 1999	Philip Hensher	Arnold Schoenberg	Premonitions (No. 1 from Five Pieces for Orchestra, Op. 16)
27 Feb 1999	Philip Hensher	Stravinsky	First pas de trois (from Agon)
27 Feb 1999	Philip Hensher	Kurt Weill	"Bilbao Song" (from Happy End)
27 Feb 1999	Philip Hensher	Hugo Wolf	"Heb' auf dein blondes Haupt" (from Italian Songbook)
6 Mar 1999	Adrian Noble	Bach	Erbarme Dich (St Matthew Passion)
6 Mar 1999	Adrian Noble	Beethoven	Mir ist so wunderbar (from Fidelio)
6 Mar 1999	Adrian Noble	Leonard Bernstein	Psalm 23 (Chichester Psalms)
6 Mar 1999	Adrian Noble	Keith Jarrett	The Cologne Concert, 1975 Part I (part)
6 Mar 1999	Adrian Noble	Monteverdi	"Lament" (Il ritorno d'Ulisse in patria)
6 Mar 1999	Adrian Noble	Mozart	"Signor guardate un poco" and "Prayer trio" (Don Giovanni)
6 Mar 1999	Adrian Noble	Henry Purcell	Chaconne – end of act 5 (The Fairy-Queen)
6 Mar 1999	Adrian Noble	Shaun Davey	The Winter's End (adapted from score for RSC production of A Winter's Tale)
13 Mar 1999	Sir Jimmy Disprin (Aka John Sessions)	William Walton	Agincourt Song (Henry V)
13 Mar 1999	Sir Jimmy Disprin (Aka John Sessions)	Britten	Billy Budd (opening)
13 Mar 1999	Sir Jimmy Disprin (Aka John Sessions)	Mozart	"In uomini, sin soldati sperare fedelta?" (You think men and soldiers will be faithful?) (act 1, Così fan tutte)
13 Mar 1999	Sir Jimmy Disprin (Aka John Sessions)	Ralph Vaughan Williams	Overture (The Wasps)
13 Mar 1999	Sir Jimmy Disprin (Aka John Sessions)	Richard Strauss	Part of trio – end of act 3 (Der Rosenkavalier)
13 Mar 1999	Sir Jimmy Disprin (Aka John Sessions)	Flanders & Swann	"The Hippopotamus Song"
13 Mar 1999	Sir Jimmy Disprin (Aka John Sessions)	Rodgers & Hammerstein	"There is nothing like a dame" (South Pacific)
20 Mar 1999	Ursula Owen	Wagner	"Liebestod" (from Tristan und Isolde), arr. Caine
20 Mar 1999	Ursula Owen	Richard Strauss	Morgen, Op. 27/4
20 Mar 1999	Ursula Owen	Schubert	Nacht und Traüme, D.827
20 Mar 1999	Ursula Owen	Haydn	Piano Trio No. 18 in E, Hob.XV/28 (2nd movement – Allegretto)
20 Mar 1999	Ursula Owen	Jerome Kern	"The Folks who live on the Hill"
20 Mar 1999	Ursula Owen	Constant Lambert	The Rio Grande (opening)
20 Mar 1999	Ursula Owen	Messiaen	"Louange à l'Éternité de Jésus" (from Quartet for the End of Time)
20 Mar 1999	Ursula Owen	Verdi	"Ah! si maledetto, sospetto fatale" (from Don Carlo)
27 Mar 1999	David Lodge	Trad. Arr. Aretha Franklin	"Going Down Slow" (from album Aretha Arrives), arr. Aretha Franklin
27 Mar 1999	David Lodge	André Previn	The Five of Us (A Different Kind of Blues)
27 Mar 1999	David Lodge	Geoffrey Burgon	Young Martin in Love (Music from Martin Chuzzlewit)
27 Mar 1999	David Lodge	John Lewis	"Django"
27 Mar 1999	David Lodge	Ravel	"Pavane pour une Infante défunte"
27 Mar 1999	David Lodge	Joaquín Rodrigo	Concerto de Aranjuez (Sketches of Spain)
27 Mar 1999	David Lodge	Van Morrison	Slim Slow Slider (from album: Astral Weeks)
27 Mar 1999	David Lodge	Tomás Luis de Victoria	"O quam gloriosum"
3 Apr 1999	David Suchet	Vivaldi	Concerto for four guitars in B minor, RV 580 (4th movement – Allegro)
3 Apr 1999	David Suchet	Carl Maria von Weber	Grand Duo Concertant, Op. 48 (Finale – Rondo: Allegro)
3 Apr 1999	David Suchet	Carl Orff	O Fortuna (from Carmina Burana)
3 Apr 1999	David Suchet	Antonio Salieri	Piano Concerto in C (3rd movement – Andantino)
3 Apr 1999	David Suchet	Rachmaninoff	Piano Concerto No. 1 (2nd movement – Andante)
3 Apr 1999	David Suchet	Mozart	Soave sia il vento (from Così fan tutte)
3 Apr 1999	David Suchet	Camille Saint-Saëns	Symphony No. 3, Op. 78 (conclusion)
3 Apr 1999	David Suchet	Mozart	Clarinet Concerto in A, K. 622 (2nd movement – Adagio)
10 Apr 1999	Vikram Seth	Carl Maria von Weber	Clarinet Quintet in B♭, Op. 134 (3rd movement – Menuetto)
10 Apr 1999	Vikram Seth	Bach	Contrapunctus I (from The Art of Fugue)
10 Apr 1999	Vikram Seth	Schubert	Erster Verlust, D.226
10 Apr 1999	Vikram Seth	Brian Wilson and Mike Love	"Fun, Fun, Fun"
10 Apr 1999	Vikram Seth	Vivaldi	Manchester Sonata No. 1 in C (3rd movement – Largo)
10 Apr 1999	Vikram Seth	N/A	Nightingale and muntjac
10 Apr 1999	Vikram Seth	Traditional music	Raga Marwa
10 Apr 1999	Vikram Seth	Alec Roth	Duet between Arion and the Dolphin (from Arion and the Dolphin)
10 Apr 1999	Vikram Seth	Bach	Am Abend, da es kühle war (from St Matthew Passion)
10 Apr 1999	Vikram Seth	Schubert	Der Kreuzzug, D.932
17 Apr 1999	Jonathan Rée	Britten	Canticle II: Abraham and Isaac (conclusion)
17 Apr 1999	Jonathan Rée	Sten Axelson, German words by Hans Joachim Bach	"Kannst du pfeifen, Johanna", arranger: Harry Frommermann
17 Apr 1999	Jonathan Rée	Leoš Janáček	Osud
17 Apr 1999	Jonathan Rée	Mozart	"Ich bin die erste Sängerin" (from Der Schauspieldirektor)
17 Apr 1999	Jonathan Rée	Reicha	Quintet in A minor, Op. 100/5 (2nd movement – Andante con variazioni)
17 Apr 1999	Jonathan Rée	Rousseau	"J'ai perdu tout mon bonheur" (from Le devin du village)
17 Apr 1999	Jonathan Rée	Schubert	"Erlkönig"
17 Apr 1999	Jonathan Rée	Schubert	Quartet in B♭, D.112 (Finale – presto)
17 Apr 1999	Jonathan Rée	Hugo Wolf	Bei einer Trauung (from Mörike-Lieder)
24 Apr 1999	Amelia Freedman	Brahms	Clarinet Quintet in B minor, Op. 115 (3rd movement – Andantino)
24 Apr 1999	Amelia Freedman	Claude Debussy	"Jeux de vagues" (from La Mer)
24 Apr 1999	Amelia Freedman	Gabriel Fauré	Une Sainte en son auréole + Puisque l'aube grandit (from La Bonne Chanson)
24 Apr 1999	Amelia Freedman	Neal Hefti	"The Kid from Red Bank"
24 Apr 1999	Amelia Freedman	Schubert	Trio in B♭, D.898 (2nd movement – Andante un poco mosso)
24 Apr 1999	Amelia Freedman	Simon Holt	Eyes, to the Shadow (from Canciones)
24 Apr 1999	Amelia Freedman	Jule Styne and Stephen Sondheim	"Everything's Coming up Roses" (from Gypsy)
24 Apr 1999	Amelia Freedman	Kurt Weill	"My Ship" (from Lady in the Dark)
1 May 1999	Peter Porter	Bach	Schmücke dich, o liebe Seele, BWV 654
1 May 1999	Peter Porter	Britten	Since she whom I loved (from Holy Sonnets of John Donne)
1 May 1999	Peter Porter	Josquin	"Miserere mei, Deus" (conclusion)
1 May 1999	Peter Porter	Mozart	"Seid uns zum zweiten Mal willkommen" (from Die Zauberflöte)
1 May 1999	Peter Porter	Peter Porter	A Brahms Intermezzo
1 May 1999	Peter Porter	Richard Strauss	Die Frau ohne Schatten (conclusion of act 1)
1 May 1999	Peter Porter	Schiller	The Gods of Greece
1 May 1999	Peter Porter	Schubert	Die Götter Griechenlands
1 May 1999	Peter Porter	Stravinsky	"The sun is bright" (from The Rake's Progress, act 1, scene 2)
1 May 1999	Peter Porter	Ralph Vaughan Williams	Symphony No. 5 (1st movement – Preludio: Moderato – opening)
8 May 1999	Susan Hill	Vincenzo Bellini	Allegro polonese (close of Concertino for Oboe in E♭ major)
8 May 1999	Susan Hill	Lennox Berkeley and Robert Herrick	"How love came in"
8 May 1999	Susan Hill	Britten	Storm' (Sea Interlude II, Peter Grimes)
8 May 1999	Susan Hill	Britten and W. H. Auden	"When you're feeling like expressing your affection"
8 May 1999	Susan Hill	Elgar	"Where Corals Lie" (no 4 of Sea Pictures op. 37)
8 May 1999	Susan Hill	Handel	Lord, I trust thee
8 May 1999	Susan Hill	Mozart	"Der Vogelfänger bin ich ja" (act 1, Die Zauberflöte)
8 May 1999	Susan Hill	Hubert Parry	"I was glad"
8 May 1999	Susan Hill	Schubert	Danksagung an den Bach (Die schöne Müllerin, D 795)
8 May 1999	Susan Hill	Ralph Vaughan Williams and R. L. Stevenson	"Bright is the ring of words"
8 May 1999	Susan Hill	Walford Davies	"God be in my head"
15 May 1999	Sam West	Bach	Suite No. 3 in C, BWV 1009 (4th movement – Sarabande)
15 May 1999	Sam West	Brian Eno and David Byrne	The Jezebel Spirit
15 May 1999	Sam West	Haydn Wood	2Roses of Picardy"
15 May 1999	Sam West	Knussen	When I Heard the Learn'd Astronomer (from Whitman Settings, Op. 25)
15 May 1999	Sam West	Felix Mendelssohn	Octet in E♭, Op. 20 (1st movement – Allegro moderato, ma con fuoco – opening)
15 May 1999	Sam West	Mussorgsky	Serenade (from Songs and Dances of Death)
15 May 1999	Sam West	Ravel	Piano Trio in A minor (3rd movement – Passacaille)
15 May 1999	Sam West	Stravinsky	Mysterious Circle of young Girls + Glorification of the Chosen Victim (from The Rite Of Spring)
15 May 1999	Sam West	Thelonious Monk	Raise Four
22 May 1999	Brian Sewell	Vincenzo Bellini	Adalgisa, Alma constanza (from Norma)
22 May 1999	Brian Sewell	Messiaen	Transports de Joie (from L'Ascension)
22 May 1999	Brian Sewell	Mussorgsky	Coronation Scene (from Boris Godunov)
22 May 1999	Brian Sewell	Henry Purcell	The Blessed Virgin's Expostulation
22 May 1999	Brian Sewell	Richard Strauss	"Beim Schlafengehen" (from Four Last Songs)
22 May 1999	Brian Sewell	Schubert	Ganymed, D.544
22 May 1999	Brian Sewell	Verdi	"Ah, veglia, O Donna" (from Rigoletto)
22 May 1999	Brian Sewell	Wagner	Lohengrin (conclusion)
29 May 1999	Kenny Werner	Beethoven	Adagio (1st movement, String Quartet op. 131)
29 May 1999	Kenny Werner	Django Bates	"Early Bloomer" (album Winter Truce & Homes Blaze)
29 May 1999	Kenny Werner	Elliott Carter	Fragment for String Quartet (1994)
29 May 1999	Kenny Werner	John Kander and Fred Ebb	"New York New York"
29 May 1999	Kenny Werner	Keith Jarrett	"Landscape for future earth" (album: Facing You)
29 May 1999	Kenny Werner	Kenny Werner	Kandinsky/Back to Light (album: Paintings)
29 May 1999	Kenny Werner	Ravel	Bolero (part)
29 May 1999	Kenny Werner	Arnold Schoenberg	4th & 5th movements (5 Orchestral Pieces, Op. 16)
5 Jun 1999	Mavis Cheek	Brahms	Selig sind, die da Leid tragen (opening of Ein Deutsches Requiem)
5 Jun 1999	Mavis Cheek	Con Conrad and Herb Magidson	"The Continental"
5 Jun 1999	Mavis Cheek	Easter Mattins	Bells of the Monastery & Procession (part)
5 Jun 1999	Mavis Cheek	Mozart	Andante – 2nd movement, Piano Concerto no. 21 in C, K 467
5 Jun 1999	Mavis Cheek	Puccini	"Te Deum" (end of act 1, Tosca)
5 Jun 1999	Mavis Cheek	Puccini	Mimì's death scene from "Mi chiamano Mimi.." (La bohème)
5 Jun 1999	Mavis Cheek	Shostakovich	1st movement, Symphony No. 5
5 Jun 1999	Mavis Cheek	Stephen Sondheim	"Send in the Clowns" (A Little Night Music)
12 Jun 1999	Tony Palmer	Bob Dylan	"All along the Watchtower"
12 Jun 1999	Tony Palmer	Britten	"Hyde Park Aria" (from Owen Wingrave)
12 Jun 1999	Tony Palmer	Billy Cowie	Kam Falla Mi!
12 Jun 1999	Tony Palmer	Philip Glass	Mrs Alexander's outburst (from Satyagraha, act 2, scene 1)
12 Jun 1999	Tony Palmer	José Pablo Moncayo	Huapango (opening)
12 Jun 1999	Tony Palmer	Puccini	"Vissi d'arte" (from Tosca)
12 Jun 1999	Tony Palmer	Rachmaninoff	Prelude in B minor, No. 10 from Preludes, Op. 32
12 Jun 1999	Tony Palmer	Shostakovich	Piano Concerto No. 2 in F, Op. 102 (2nd movement – Andante)
12 Jun 1999	Tony Palmer	Ralph Vaughan Williams	A London Symphony (2nd movement – Lento – conclusion)
19 Jun 1999	Lady Natasha Spender	Bach	Fugue (2nd movement, Sonata No. 1 in G minor BWV 1001)
19 Jun 1999	Lady Natasha Spender	Samuel Barber	Allegro vivace e leggero (2nd movement, Piano Sonata Op. 26)
19 Jun 1999	Lady Natasha Spender	Beethoven	Allegro appassionato (finale, String Quartet in A minor, Op. 132)
19 Jun 1999	Lady Natasha Spender	Britten	"Joe has gone fishing" (end of act 1, Peter Grimes)
19 Jun 1999	Lady Natasha Spender	Lennox Berkeley	Presto (2nd movement, Piano Sonata op. 20)
19 Jun 1999	Lady Natasha Spender	Mozart	Ach, ich fühls (Die Zauberflöte)
19 Jun 1999	Lady Natasha Spender	Schubert	1st movement, Piano Sonata in B♭
26 Jun 1999	Leonard Ingrams	Robert Schumann	Märchenbilder op. 113, no. 3 – Rasch
26 Jun 1999	Leonard Ingrams	Richard Strauss	Verwandlung (part) & Mondlicht (closing of Daphne)
26 Jun 1999	Leonard Ingrams	Anonymous work	"I will give my love an apple"
26 Jun 1999	Leonard Ingrams	Anonymous work	"O Waly Waly"
26 Jun 1999	Leonard Ingrams	Bach	Friede über Israel (Closing chorus of Whitsun Cantata BWV 34)
26 Jun 1999	Leonard Ingrams	Haydn	"Un certo ruscelletto" ("Like a little brook") (Il mondo della luna, act 3)
26 Jun 1999	Leonard Ingrams	Hindemith	Trauermusik
26 Jun 1999	Leonard Ingrams	Henry Purcell	Fantasia for 4 viols in C minor Z738
26 Jun 1999	Leonard Ingrams	Ralph Vaughan Williams	Evening Hymn (no 4 of Four Hymns for tenor, viola and piano)
26 Jun 1999	Leonard Ingrams	Tomás Luis de Victoria	O vos omnes (Tenebrae Responsories)
3 Jul 1999	Peter Eyre	Vincenzo Bellini	Qui la voce sua soave ... (I Puritani)
3 Jul 1999	Peter Eyre	Chopin	Ballade No. 4 in F minor (part)
3 Jul 1999	Peter Eyre	Elgar	1st movement (opening), Piano Quintet in A minor Op. 84
3 Jul 1999	Peter Eyre	Messiaen	Ta Voix (Poèmes pour Mi)
3 Jul 1999	Peter Eyre	Schubert	Das Wirtshaus (Winterreise)
3 Jul 1999	Peter Eyre	Verdi	"Dio ch nell'alma infondere" (Don Carlos)
3 Jul 1999	Peter Eyre	Wagner	Liebestod (Tristan und Isolde)
10 Jul 1999	Paul Levy	Bach	Was willst du dich, mein Geist, entsetzen (Cantata BWV 8 'Liebster Gott, wann werd ich sterben?')
10 Jul 1999	Paul Levy	Beethoven	Andante & Vivace (1st movement, Sonata No. 4 in C major for cello & piano Op. 102, No. 1)
10 Jul 1999	Paul Levy	Alban Berg	Violin Concerto (1st movement)
10 Jul 1999	Paul Levy	Sammy Cahn and Saul Chaplin and Sholom Secunda	"Bei mir bist du schoen" ("shayn")
10 Jul 1999	Paul Levy	Maschwitz and Jack Strachey	"These Foolish Things" (album: These Foolish Things)
10 Jul 1999	Paul Levy	Mozart	"In diesen heil'gen Hallen" (act 2, The Magic Flute)
10 Jul 1999	Paul Levy	Robert Schumann	Die beiden Grenadiere
10 Jul 1999	Paul Levy	Tchaikovsky	Prince Gremin's aria in praise of Tatyana (act 2, Eugene Onegin)
17 Jul 1999	Nichola McAuliffe	Britten	Moonlight (from Four Sea Interludes from Peter Grimes)
17 Jul 1999	Nichola McAuliffe	Philip Glass	Dance V (from In the Upper Room)
17 Jul 1999	Nichola McAuliffe	Mozart	"Il mio tesoro" (from Don Giovanni)
17 Jul 1999	Nichola McAuliffe	Arnold Schoenberg	"Heimfahrt" and "O alter Duft" (from Pierrot lunaire)
17 Jul 1999	Nichola McAuliffe	Traditional music	El Soldado Ricante
17 Jul 1999	Nichola McAuliffe	Traditional music	Tuvan throat singing
17 Jul 1999	Nichola McAuliffe	Ralph Vaughan Williams	"Silent Noon" (from The House of Life)
17 Jul 1999	Nichola McAuliffe	Wagner	Rienzi Overture
24 Jul 1999	Dr. Anthony Stevens	Cole Porter	Experiment
24 Jul 1999	Dr. Anthony Stevens	Claude Debussy	String Quartet in G minor, Op. 10 (1st movement, Animé et très décidé)
24 Jul 1999	Dr. Anthony Stevens	Elgar	The Swimmer (Sea Pictures Op. 37)
24 Jul 1999	Dr. Anthony Stevens	Handel	From Harmony, from heavenly Harmony (Ode for St Cecilia's Day)
24 Jul 1999	Dr. Anthony Stevens	Kamilieris	Last evening in the taverna (Hasapiko – Butcher's Dance)
24 Jul 1999	Dr. Anthony Stevens	Francis Poulenc	Hommage à Schubert (Improvisations No. 12)
24 Jul 1999	Dr. Anthony Stevens	Henry Purcell	Sound the Trumpet (Come Ye Sons of Art)
24 Jul 1999	Dr. Anthony Stevens	Schubert	Wohin? (Die schöne Müllerin)
24 Jul 1999	Dr. Anthony Stevens	Stanford	The little Admiral (4th of Songs of the Fleet)
24 Jul 1999	Dr. Anthony Stevens	William Walton	En Famille (Façade)
31 Jul 1999	Lord Neill	Bach	Menuets I & II + Gigue (from Partita in B♭, BWV 825)
31 Jul 1999	Lord Neill	Beethoven	Septet in E♭, Op. 20 (2nd movement – Adagio cantabile)
31 Jul 1999	Lord Neill	Britten	Peter Grimes (conclusion of act 1, scene 1)
31 Jul 1999	Lord Neill	Haydn	Symphony No. 102 in B♭ (Finale – presto)
31 Jul 1999	Lord Neill	Leoš Janáček	Káťa Kabanová (conclusion of act 2)
31 Jul 1999	Lord Neill	Liszt	Gnomenreigen
31 Jul 1999	Lord Neill	Montsalvatge	Divertimento No. 2 – Habañera
31 Jul 1999	Lord Neill	Mozart	O voto tremendo (from Idomeneo)
31 Jul 1999	Lord Neill	Robert Schumann	Im wunderschönen Monat Mai + Das ist ein Flöten und Geigen (from Dichterliebe)
7 Aug 1999	Stephen Bayley	Beethoven	Triple Concerto in C, Op. 56 (1st movement – Allegro – first part)
7 Aug 1999	Stephen Bayley	Brahms	Denn alles Fleisch, es ist wie Gras (from A German Requiem) (first part)
7 Aug 1999	Stephen Bayley	Handel	Ombra mai fu (from Xerxes)
7 Aug 1999	Stephen Bayley	Mick Jagger and Keith Richards	"Gimmie Shelter" (pub ABKCO Music)
7 Aug 1999	Stephen Bayley	Puccini	"Bimba dagli occhi pieni di malìa" (from Madama Butterfly)
7 Aug 1999	Stephen Bayley	Domenico Scarlatti	Sonata in E, Kk.380
7 Aug 1999	Stephen Bayley	Schubert	"An die Musik"
7 Aug 1999	Stephen Bayley	Ned Washington and Victor Young	A Hundred Years from Today
7 Aug 1999	Stephen Bayley	Kurt Weill	"September Song" (from Knickerbocker Holiday)
14 Aug 1999	Django Bates	Bob Dylan	"Just like a Woman" (from the album Songs of the Poets)
14 Aug 1999	Django Bates	Farmers Market	"Nell in the sky with Farmers" (from the album Musik fra Hybridene)
14 Aug 1999	Django Bates	Charles Ives	Three Quarter-tone Pieces for Two Pianos (No. 1 – Largo)
14 Aug 1999	Django Bates	Keith Jarrett	"Blossom" (from the album Belonging)
14 Aug 1999	Django Bates	Fritz Kreisler	Caprice Viennois
14 Aug 1999	Django Bates	Lester Young	"Lester Leaps In" (from the album Bird is Free)
14 Aug 1999	Django Bates	Miles Davis	"Sivad" (excerpt) (from the album Live-Evil)
14 Aug 1999	Django Bates	N/A	Romanian folk music
14 Aug 1999	Django Bates	Conlon Nancarrow	Study for Player Piano No. 40A
21 Aug 1999	Sophie Ryder	Claude Debussy	"Golliwog's Cakewalk" (from Children's Corner)
21 Aug 1999	Sophie Ryder	Trad. Mexican	La Iguana
21 Aug 1999	Sophie Ryder	Bach	Sicilienne (2nd movement, Sonata in E♭ major, BWV 1031 for flute and harpsichord)
21 Aug 1999	Sophie Ryder	Domenico Scarlatti	Sonata in B minor (L 449/Kp 27)
21 Aug 1999	Sophie Ryder	Liszt	Valse oubliée No. 1 in A minor
21 Aug 1999	Sophie Ryder	Morton Feldman	Why patterns? (part)
21 Aug 1999	Sophie Ryder	A. Marly and H. Zaret	"The Partisan" (from album: Songs from a Room)
21 Aug 1999	Sophie Ryder	Anthony Newley and Leslie Bricusse	"Feeling Good"
21 Aug 1999	Sophie Ryder	Antônio Carlos Jobim and Gene Lees	"Corcovado" ("Quiet Nights of Quiet Stars")
21 Aug 1999	Sophie Ryder	Bach	"Herr, unser Herrscher" (end of opening chorus, St John Passion)
28 Aug 1999	Robert David MacDonald	Schubert	Nacht und Träume
28 Aug 1999	Robert David MacDonald	Richard Strauss	Recognition scene (from Elektra) (pub. Boosey)
28 Aug 1999	Robert David MacDonald	Bach	"Bist du bei mir"
28 Aug 1999	Robert David MacDonald	Vincenzo Bellini	Mira O Norma (from Norma)
28 Aug 1999	Robert David MacDonald	Liszt	Le Triumphe Funèbre de Tasso (conclusion)
28 Aug 1999	Robert David MacDonald	Sergei Prokofiev	Lullaby (from On Guard for Peace)
28 Aug 1999	Robert David MacDonald	Ambroise Thomas	Connais-tu le pays (from Mignon)
28 Aug 1999	Robert David MacDonald	Verdi	"Chi i bei di m'adduce ancora" (song)
4 Sep 1999	Rainer Hersch	Handel	"The Arrival of the Queen of Sheba", arr. Hersch
4 Sep 1999	Rainer Hersch	Handel	"Why do the Nations?" (from The Messiah: A Soulful Celebration) arr. Mervyn Warren
4 Sep 1999	Rainer Hersch	Schubert	Abschied + Die Taubenpost (from Schwanengesang)
4 Sep 1999	Rainer Hersch	Richard Strauss	Metamorphosen (conclusion)
4 Sep 1999	Rainer Hersch	Arnold Schoenberg	Musette (from Suite, Op. 25)
4 Sep 1999	Rainer Hersch	John Philip Sousa	"The Stars and Stripes Forever", arr. Horowitz
4 Sep 1999	Rainer Hersch	Charles-Valentin Alkan	Comme le Vent, Op. 39/1 (from 12 Studies in minor keys)
4 Sep 1999	Rainer Hersch	Bach	Concerto in A, BWV 1055 (3rd movement – Allegro ma non tanto)
4 Sep 1999	Rainer Hersch	Sandy Linzer and Denny Randell	"A Lover's Concerto"
11 Sep 1999	Jonathan Coe	Claude Debussy	Interlude. Tempo di Minuetto (2nd movement, Sonata for flute, viola and harp, from Six sonatas for various instruments)
11 Sep 1999	Jonathan Coe	Herbert Howells	Merry Eye
11 Sep 1999	Jonathan Coe	Kenny Wheeler	Consolation (Part VI, The Sweet Time Suite)
11 Sep 1999	Jonathan Coe	Miklós Rózsa	Lento cantabile (2nd movement, Concerto for violin & orchestra Op. 24)
11 Sep 1999	Jonathan Coe	Francis Poulenc	Déploration (3rd movement, Oboe Sonata)
11 Sep 1999	Jonathan Coe	Robert Wyatt	Sea Song
18 Sep 1999	John Humphrys	Bach	Sarabande (from Suite No. 1 in G, BWV 1007)
18 Sep 1999	John Humphrys	Beethoven	String Quartet in C♯ minor, Op. 131: (1st movement – Adagio non troppo)
18 Sep 1999	John Humphrys	Billy Strayhorn	"Take the A Train"
18 Sep 1999	John Humphrys	Elgar	Cello Concerto, Op. 85 (3rd movement – Adagio)
18 Sep 1999	John Humphrys	Duke Ellington and Johnny Hodges	"Weary Blues"
18 Sep 1999	John Humphrys	Gabriel Fauré	Sanctus (from Requiem, Op. 48)
18 Sep 1999	John Humphrys	Joseph Parry	"Myfanwy"
18 Sep 1999	John Humphrys	Paul Simon	"The Sound of Silence"
18 Sep 1999	John Humphrys	Rodgers and Hart	"Manhattan"
25 Sep 1999	Keith Swanwick	Julia Eboly	untitled piano composition
25 Sep 1999	Keith Swanwick	Elgar	Symphony No. 2 in E♭, Op. 63 (3rd movement – Rondo: Presto)
25 Sep 1999	Keith Swanwick	John Lennon and Paul McCartney	"Ticket to Ride"
25 Sep 1999	Keith Swanwick	Ligeti	Musica Ricercata (1st movement)
25 Sep 1999	Keith Swanwick	Miles Davis	"Flamenco Sketches" (from Kind of Blue)
25 Sep 1999	Keith Swanwick	Schubert	Frühlingstraum (from Winterreise, D.911)
25 Sep 1999	Keith Swanwick	John Philip Sousa	"The Stars and Stripes for Ever"
25 Sep 1999	Keith Swanwick	Timbalada	Cadè O Timbau?
2 Oct 1999	William Lyne	Haydn	4th movement from String Quartet in B♭, Op. 76, No. 4)
2 Oct 1999	William Lyne	Schubert	Die Taubenpost
2 Oct 1999	William Lyne	Verdi	Duet, act 1 "Dinne... alcun là von vedisti?" (Simon Boccanegra)
2 Oct 1999	William Lyne	Handel	Scene 5 (part) – act 3, Saul
2 Oct 1999	William Lyne	Johann Strauss II	"Spiel ich die Unschuld vom Lande" (Die Fledermaus)
2 Oct 1999	William Lyne	Reynaldo Hahn	Tyndaris
2 Oct 1999	William Lyne	François Couperin	"Les Barricades mysterieuses" (Livre de clavecin Book 2, Ordre 6)
2 Oct 1999	William Lyne	Reynaldo Hahn	"L'heure exquise" (from Chansons grises)
2 Oct 1999	William Lyne	Schubert	Andante con moto (Piano trio in E♭, D 929)
9 Oct 1999	John Carey	Gregorio Allegri	Miserere
9 Oct 1999	John Carey	Bach	Bourrées 1 and 2 (from Suite No. 4 in E♭, BWV 1010)
9 Oct 1999	John Carey	Beethoven	Piano Trio in B♭, Op. 97 – "Archduke" (4th movement – Allegro moderato – presto)
9 Oct 1999	John Carey	Gilbert and Sullivan	"If you're anxious for to shine" (from Patience)
9 Oct 1999	John Carey	Haydn	The Heavens are Telling (from The Creation)
9 Oct 1999	John Carey	Felix Mendelssohn	Violin Concerto in E minor, Op. 64 (Finale – Allegro molto vivace)
9 Oct 1999	John Carey	Verdi	"Ah, fors'é lui" (from La traviata)
9 Oct 1999	John Carey	Carl Maria von Weber	Clarinet Concerto No. 2 in E♭, Op. 74
16 Oct 1999	Sidonie Goossens	Alban Berg	7 Early Songs – No. 6 Liebesode
16 Oct 1999	Sidonie Goossens	Britten	Nocturne for tenor, seven sol instruments and strings – 3rd movement "Encinctur'd with a twine of leaves" (with harp obbligato)
16 Oct 1999	Sidonie Goossens	Britten	Young Person's Guide to the Orchestra
16 Oct 1999	Sidonie Goossens	Frederick Delius	Brigg Fair
16 Oct 1999	Sidonie Goossens	Elgar	Symphony No. 1, 3rd movement
16 Oct 1999	Sidonie Goossens	Sergei Prokofiev	Prelude, Op. 12, No. 7 (originally for piano)
16 Oct 1999	Sidonie Goossens	Ravel	Introduction and Allegro
16 Oct 1999	Sidonie Goossens	Ralph Vaughan Williams	Serenade to Music
23 Oct 1999	Al Alvarez	Al Alvarez	Ann Dancing
23 Oct 1999	Al Alvarez	Beethoven	Sonata in C minor, Op. 111 (2nd movement – Arietta)
23 Oct 1999	Al Alvarez	Harry Ruby	2There's a girl in the heart of Wheeling, West Virginia"
23 Oct 1999	Al Alvarez	Leoš Janáček	"The barn owl has not flown away" (from On an Overgrown Path)
23 Oct 1999	Al Alvarez	Mozart	Di scrivermi ogni giorno (from Così fan tutte)
23 Oct 1999	Al Alvarez	Pérotin	Viderunt omnes (opening)
23 Oct 1999	Al Alvarez	S. Silverstein	"Everybody's Makin' It Big But Me"
23 Oct 1999	Al Alvarez	Schubert	Notturno in E♭ major, D897 (opening)
23 Oct 1999	Al Alvarez	Jean Sibelius	Symphony No. 4 in A minor, Op. 63 (opening of last movement – Allegro)
30 Oct 1999	Jim Crace	Mahler	Symphony No. 5 – Funeral March arr. Caine
30 Oct 1999	Jim Crace	Benedict Mason	Lighthouses of England and Wales (opening)
30 Oct 1999	Jim Crace	Jim Crace	Being Dead (opening)
30 Oct 1999	Jim Crace	John Adams	The Day Chorus (from The Death of Klinghoffer, act 2)
30 Oct 1999	Jim Crace	Julian Argüelles	Qaanaaq (from the album Skull View)
30 Oct 1999	Jim Crace	Louis Sclavis	Moi c'est S'Mariano (from the album Clarinettes)
30 Oct 1999	Jim Crace	Youssou N'Dour and Jean-Philippe Rykiel	"Tourista" (from the album The Guide (Wommat))
30 Oct 1999	Jim Crace	Paganini	Sonata in A, Op. 3/1
30 Oct 1999	Jim Crace	Francis Poulenc	Sonata for Two Clarinets (3rd movement – Vif)
30 Oct 1999	Jim Crace	Schubert	Impromptu in F minor, D.935/1
6 Nov 1999	Robin JH Simon	Handel	"All we like sheep" (Messiah)
6 Nov 1999	Robin JH Simon	William Byrd	Ave verum corpus
6 Nov 1999	Robin JH Simon	Henry Purcell	"Dear pretty youth" (act 4, The Tempest)
6 Nov 1999	Robin JH Simon	Schubert	Der Erlkönig
6 Nov 1999	Robin JH Simon	Puccini	E gelida manina (La Bohème)
6 Nov 1999	Robin JH Simon	Verdi	"E scherzo, od è follia" [It is a joke, or madness] (Un ballo in maschera)
6 Nov 1999	Robin JH Simon	Chopin	Fantasie-Impromptu in C♯ minor, Op. 66
6 Nov 1999	Robin JH Simon	Mozart	"Notte e giorno faticar" (act 1, Don Giovanni)
6 Nov 1999	Robin JH Simon	Caradog Roberts	"I bob un sy'n ffyddlon" (tune: Rachie)
6 Nov 1999	Robin JH Simon	Rossini	"Largo al factotum" (act 1, Il barbiere di Siviglia)
13 Nov 1999	Anthony Sampson	Trad. Arr. Solomon Linda	Mbube arr. Linda
13 Nov 1999	Anthony Sampson	Bach	Suite No. 2 in D minor, BWV 1008 (1st movement – Prélude)
13 Nov 1999	Anthony Sampson	Beethoven	Variations on "Ein Mädchen oder Weibchen", Op. 66
13 Nov 1999	Anthony Sampson	Berlioz	Harold in Italy (1st movement – Harold in the Mountains – first part)
13 Nov 1999	Anthony Sampson	Bizet	Minuetto (from L'Arlésienne, Suite No. 2)
13 Nov 1999	Anthony Sampson	Hugh Masekela and Cedric Samson	"Thank you Madiba" (pub. Kayden Music/Warner Chappell)
13 Nov 1999	Anthony Sampson	Mozart	Final reconciliation scene (from Le Nozze di Figaro)
13 Nov 1999	Anthony Sampson	Puccini	Gratias agimus Tibi (from Messa di Gloria)
13 Nov 1999	Anthony Sampson	Verdi	Finale (from Falstaff, act 3)
20 Nov 1999	Gaia Servado	Berlioz	Appearance of the Ghost of Hector (from Les Troyens, act 2)
20 Nov 1999	Gaia Servado	Claude Debussy	Interlude (Descent into the vaults) (from Pelléas et Mélisande)
20 Nov 1999	Gaia Servado	Mozart	Sento, o Dio (from Così fan Tutte)
20 Nov 1999	Gaia Servado	Brahms	Symphony No. 2 in D, Op. 73 (2nd movement – Adagio non troppo)
20 Nov 1999	Gaia Servado	Mozart	Symphony No. 40 in G minor. K.550 (2nd movemenvt – Andante) (first part)
20 Nov 1999	Gaia Servado	Mussorgsky	Chorus of Priestesses (from Salammbô)
20 Nov 1999	Gaia Servado	Rossini	William Tell
20 Nov 1999	Gaia Servado	Verdi	"É tardi" (from La traviata)
27 Nov 1999	John Morgan	Vincenzo Bellini	Mira, O Norma (from Norma)
27 Nov 1999	John Morgan	Brahms	Piano Trio No. 3 in C minor, Op. 101 (1st movement – Allegro energico)
27 Nov 1999	John Morgan	Handel	"To Thee, Thou glorious Son" (from Theodora)
27 Nov 1999	John Morgan	Haydn	Benedictus (from Missa Brevis Sancti Joannis de Deo – "Little Organ Mass")
27 Nov 1999	John Morgan	Francis Poulenc	Reine des Mouettes (from Métamorphoses)
27 Nov 1999	John Morgan	Schubert	Sonata in A, D.664 (2nd movement – Andante)
27 Nov 1999	John Morgan	Robert Schumann	Im wunderschönen Monat Mai (from Dichterliebe, Op. 48)
27 Nov 1999	John Morgan	Wagner	Wotan's Farewell (opening) (from Die Walküre)
4 Dec 1999	Jeremy Dixon	Robert Schumann	Die alten bosen Lieder (from Dichterliebe, Op. 48)
4 Dec 1999	Jeremy Dixon	Richard Strauss	Ja, ist Sie da?... (from Der Rosenkavalier) (pub. Boosey)
4 Dec 1999	Jeremy Dixon	Alan Price	"Poor People" (from O Lucky Man!)
4 Dec 1999	Jeremy Dixon	Bach	Goldberg Variations (Variation 25)
4 Dec 1999	Jeremy Dixon	Brahms	Intermezzo in B♭ minor, Op. 117/2
4 Dec 1999	Jeremy Dixon	Britten	The Children (from Who are these children, Op. 84) (pub. Faber)
4 Dec 1999	Jeremy Dixon	Haydn	String Quartet in D, Op. 33/6 (2nd movement – Andante)
4 Dec 1999	Jeremy Dixon	Conlon Nancarrow	Study No. 21 (Canon – X) (pub. Schott)
11 Dec 1999	Victoria Glendinning	Britten	One ever hangs where shelled roads part... (Agnus Dei – Part V, War Requiem)
11 Dec 1999	Victoria Glendinning	Chopin	Etude in E major Op. 10, No. 3
11 Dec 1999	Victoria Glendinning	Cole Porter	"True Love" (from High Society)
11 Dec 1999	Victoria Glendinning	Handel	O Lovely Peace (Judas Maccabeus)
11 Dec 1999	Victoria Glendinning	John Lennon and Paul McCartney	"The Long and Winding Road"
11 Dec 1999	Victoria Glendinning	Mahler	End of Finale (1st Symphony)
11 Dec 1999	Victoria Glendinning	Mozart	"Deh vieni, non tardar" (Come, do not delay..) – act 4, The Marriage of Figaro
11 Dec 1999	Victoria Glendinning	John Tavener	The Protecting Veil (opening)
18 Dec 1999	Simon Schama	Lonnie Carter and Little Walter	"Sittin' on top of the World"
18 Dec 1999	Simon Schama	Leoš Janáček	The Cunning Little Vixen
18 Dec 1999	Simon Schama	Juan Luis Guerra	Ojalá que llueva café
18 Dec 1999	Simon Schama	Puccini	"Dunque è proprio finita" (from La bohème, act 3)
18 Dec 1999	Simon Schama	Rodgers and Hart	"Manhattan"
18 Dec 1999	Simon Schama	Schubert	Impromptu in G♭, D.899/3
18 Dec 1999	Simon Schama	Schubert	Quintet in C, D.956 (3rd movement – Scherzo – first part)
18 Dec 1999	Simon Schama	Verdi	"L'onore! Ladri" (from Falstaff, act 1, part 1)
18 Dec 1999	Simon Schama	Vivaldi	Flute Concerto in G minor, RV 439 – La Notte (3rd movemenvt – Largo: Il Sonno)
25 Dec 1999	Don Maguire (Aka John Sessions)	Philip Glass	Dance no. 2 for Organ (part)
25 Dec 1999	Don Maguire (Aka John Sessions)	John Cage	Fifty-six marches (3rd movement – 'A dip in the lake' for cello & toy instruments)
25 Dec 1999	Don Maguire (Aka John Sessions)	Lou Reed	"I'll be your mirror"
25 Dec 1999	Don Maguire (Aka John Sessions)	Laurie Anderson	"O Superman" (part)
25 Dec 1999	Don Maguire (Aka John Sessions)	Charles Ives	Prelude: Maestoso (1st movement, 4th symphony)
25 Dec 1999	Don Maguire (Aka John Sessions)	Jay Livingston and Ray Evans	Theme from Bonanza
25 Dec 1999	Don Maguire (Aka John Sessions)	Aaron Copland	Appalachian Spring (part)
