= Joan Baez discography =

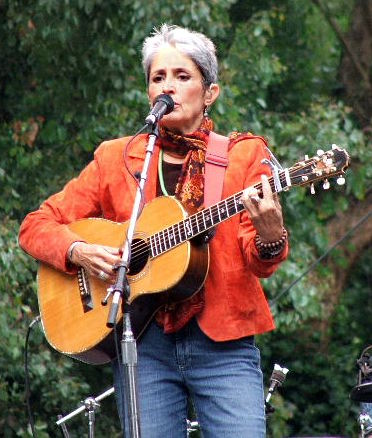
- Baez at the Hardly Strictly Bluegrass Festival in 2005 at Golden Gate Park
- Studio albums: 25
- Extended plays: 4
- Soundtrack albums: 4
- Live albums: 15
- Compilation albums: 23
- Singles: 35
- Video albums: 7

This is a discography for American folk singer and songwriter Joan Baez.

== Studio albums ==
=== 1959 ===
"Folksingers 'Round Harvard Square" 1959 - with Bill Wood and Ted Alevizos

=== 1960s ===
List of albums, with selected chart positions
Title	Album details	Peak chart positions					Certifications
Title	Album details	US	CAN	GER	NO	UK	Certifications
Joan Baez	Released: October 1960; Label: Vanguard	20	—	38	—	9	RIAA: Gold; BPI: Silver
Joan Baez, Vol. 2	Released: September 1961; Label: Vanguard	21	—	—	—	—	RIAA: Gold
Joan Baez/5	Released: October 1964; Label: Vanguard	12	—	—	—	3	
Farewell, Angelina	Released: October 1965; Label: Vanguard	10	—	30	—	5	
Noël	Released: October 1966; Label: Vanguard	—	—	—	—	—	
Joan	Released: August 1967; Label: Vanguard	38	—	—	16	—	
Baptism: A Journey Through Our Time	Released: June 1968; Label: Vanguard	84	—	—	—	—	
Any Day Now	Released: December 1968; Label: Vanguard	30	—	—	—	—	RIAA: Gold
David's Album	Released: June 1969; Label: Vanguard	36	33	—	—	—	
"—" denotes a recording that did not chart or was not released in that territory.

=== 1970s ===
List of albums, with selected chart positions
Title	Album details	Peak chart positions				Certifications
Title	Album details	US	AUS	CAN	NO	Certifications
One Day at a Time	March 1970; Label: Vanguard	80	—	35	—	
Blessed Are...	Released: August 1971; Label: Vanguard	11	36	12	26	RIAA: Gold
Come from the Shadows	Released: April 1972; Label: A&M	48	—	41	—	
Where Are You Now, My Son?	Released: March 1973; Label: A&M	138	—	—	—	
Gracias a la Vida	Released: July 1974; Label: A&M	—	—	—	—	
Diamonds & Rust	Released: April 1975; Label: A&M	11	62	28	—	RIAA: Gold
Gulf Winds	Released: November 1976; Label: A&M	62	—	55	—	
Blowin' Away	Released: July 1977; Label: CBS	54	—	69	—	
Honest Lullaby	Released: April 1979; Label: CBS	113	—	—	—	
"—" denotes a recording that did not chart or was not released in that territory.

=== 1980–present ===
List of albums, with selected chart positions
Title	Album details	Peak chart positions			Certifications
Title	Album details	US	GER	UK	Certifications
Recently	Released: July 1987; Label: Gold Castle	—	—	—	
Speaking of Dreams	Released: November 1989; Label: Gold Castle	—	—	—	
Play Me Backwards	Released: October 1992; Label: Virgin	—	—	—	
Gone from Danger	Released: September 23, 1997; Label: Guardian	—	—	—	
Dark Chords on a Big Guitar	Released: September 9, 2003; Label: Koch	—	—	—	
Day After Tomorrow	Released: September 9, 2008; Label: Proper	128	95	100	IMPALA: 2x Silver
Whistle Down the Wind	Released: March 2018; Label: Proper	88	8	47	
"—" denotes a recording that did not chart or was not released in that territory.

== Live albums ==
List of albums, with selected chart positions
Title	Album details	Peak chart positions				Certifications
Title	Album details	US	CAN	GER	UK	Certifications
Joan Baez in Concert	October September 1962; Label: Vanguard	10	—	—	—	RIAA: Gold
Joan Baez in Concert, Part 2	Released: November 1963; Label: Vanguard	7	—	25	8	
Joan Baez in San Francisco	Released: 1964; Label: Fantasy	—	—	—	—	
Joan Baez In Italy	Released: 1969; Label: Vanguard	—	—	—	—	
From Every Stage	Released: February 1976; Label: A&M	34	49	—	—	
European Tour	Released: 1980; Label: CBS	—	—	—	—	
Live Europe '83	Released: January 1984; Label: Gamma	—	—	—	—	FRA: Platinum
Diamonds & Rust in the Bullring	Released: December 1988; Label: Gold Castle	—	—	—	—	
Ring Them Bells	Released: August 1995; Label: Guardian	—	—	—	—	IMPALA: Silver
Live at Newport	Released: September 17, 1996; Label: Vanguard	—	—	—	—	
Bowery Songs	Released: September 2005; Label: Proper Records	—	—	—	—	
Ring Them Bells (double-disc reissue with bonus tracks)	Released: February 2007; Label: Proper Records	—	—	—	—	
Diamantes (limited issue for 2014 South American tour)	Released: March 9, 2015; Label: Proper Records (PRPCD129)	—	—	—	—	
75th Birthday Celebration (CD and DVD of show at Beacon Theatre)	Released: June 10, 2016; Label: Razor & Tie	—	—	45	—	
Live At Woodstock	Released: August 2, 2019; Label: Craft Recordings	—	—	—	—	
"—" denotes a recording that did not chart or was not released in that territory.

== Soundtrack albums ==
1. Sacco & Vanzetti, RCA Victor (1971)
2. Carry It On, Vanguard (1971)
3. Silent Running, Decca (1972)
4. How Sweet the Sound, Razor & Tie (2009)

== Compilations ==
1. Folksingers 'Round Harvard Square (1959) / Re-Released as The Best of Joan Baez, Squire (1963)#45 POP
2. Portrait of Joan Baez (1967) (UK Only)
3. Joan Baez On Vanguard (1969) (UK Only) #15 UK
4. The First 10 Years, Vanguard (November 1970) #73 US #41 UK #37 CAN
5. The Joan Baez Ballad Book, Vanguard (1972) #188 US
6. Hits: Greatest and Others, Vanguard (1973) #163 US, #63 Australia
7. The Contemporary Ballad Book, Vanguard (1974)
8. The Joan Baez Lovesong Album, Vanguard (1976) #205 US
9. Best of Joan C. Baez, A&M (1977) #121 US
10. The Joan Baez Country Music Album (1979)
11. Very Early Joan, Vanguard (1982)
12. Joan Baez: Classics, A&M (1986)
13. Brothers in Arms, Gold Castle (1991)
14. No Woman No Cry, Laserlight (February 1992)
15. Rare, Live & Classic (box set), Vanguard (1993)
16. The Best of Joan Baez, Vanguard (1995)
17. Greatest Hits, A&M (1996)
18. Vanguard Sessions: Baez Sings Dylan, Vanguard (1998)
19. Imagine, Universal 1998
20. Best of Joan Baez: The Millennium Collection, A&M/Universal (1999)
21. The Complete A&M Recordings, Universal/A&M (2003)
22. Vanguard Visionaries: Joan Baez, Vanguard (2007)
23. The Complete Gold Castle Masters (box set), Razor & Tie (2017)

== Singles ==
Year	Single (A-side, B-side) Both sides from same album except where indicated	Peak positions			Certification	Album
Year	Single (A-side, B-side) Both sides from same album except where indicated	US	US AC	UK	Certification	Album
1961	"Banks of the Ohio" b/w "Old Blue"	—	—	—		Joan Baez, Vol. 2
1962	"Lonesome Road" b/w "Pal of Mine"	—	—	—		Joan Baez, Vol. 2
1963	"What Have They Done to the Rain" b/w "Danger Waters"	—	—	—		Joan Baez in Concert
1963	"We Shall Overcome" b/w "What Have They Done to the Rain" (from Joan Baez in Concert)	90	—	26		Joan Baez in Concert, Part 2
1965	"There But for Fortune" b/w "Daddy You Been on My Mind" (from Farewell, Angelina)	50	16	8		5
1965	"It's All Over Now, Baby Blue" b/w "Daddy You Been on My Mind"	—	—	22		Farewell, Angelina
1965	"Farewell, Angelina" b/w "Queen of Hearts" (from 4 in Stereo)	—	—	35		Farewell, Angelina
1966	"Pack Up Your Sorrows" b/w "The Swallow Song"	—	—	50		Non-album tracks
1966	"The Little Drummer Boy" b/w "Cantique De Noel"	—	—	—		Noel
1967	"Be Not Too Hard" b/w "North"	—	—	—		Joan
1969	"If I Knew" b/w "Rock Salt and Nails"	—	—	—		David's Album
1969	"Love Is Just a Four-Letter Word" b/w "Love Minus Zero/No Limit"	86	—	—		Any Day Now
1970	"No Expectations" b/w "One Day at a Time"	—	—	—		One Day at a Time
1971	"The Night They Drove Old Dixie Down" b/w "When Time Is Stolen"	3	1	6	RIAA: Gold	Blessed Are...
1971	"Here's to You" b/w "The Ballad of Sacco & Vanzetti – Part 2"	—	—	—		Sacco e Vanzetti
1971	"Let It Be" b/w "Poor Wayfaring Stranger" (from David's Album)	49	5	—		Blessed Are...
1971	"Rejoice in the Sun" b/w "Silent Running"	—	—	—		Silent Running Soundtrack
1972	"Will the Circle Be Unbroken" b/w "Precious Lord Take My Hand" / "Just a Closer Walk with Thee"	—	—	—		David's Album
1972	"Song of Bangladesh" b/w "Prison Trilogy"	—	—	—		Come from the Shadows
1972	"In the Quiet Morning" b/w "To Bobby"	69	22	—		Come from the Shadows
1972	"Tumbleweed" b/w "Love Song to a Stranger"	—	—	—		Come from the Shadows
1973	"Best of Friends" b/w "Mary Call"	—	—	—		Where Are You Now, My Son?
1973	"Less Than the Song" b/w "Windrose"	—	—	—		Where Are You Now, My Son?
1974	"Forever Young" b/w "Guantanamera" (from Gracias a La Vida)	—	13	—		Non-album track
1975	"Blue Sky" b/w "Dida" (from Gracias a La Vida)	57	46	—		Diamonds & Rust
1975	"Diamonds and Rust" b/w "Winds of the Old Days"	35	5	—		Diamonds & Rust
1976	"Please Come to Boston" b/w "Love Song to a Stranger" -- Part 2	—	—	—		From Every Stage
1976	"Never Dreamed You'd Leave in Summer" b/w "Children and All That Jazz"	—	—	—		Diamonds & Rust
1976	"Caruso" b/w "Time Is Passing Us By"	—	—	—		Gulf Winds
1977	"I'm Blowin' Away" b/w "Altar Boy and the Thief"	—	—	—		Blowin' Away
1977	"Time Rag" b/w "Miracles"	—	—	—		Blowin' Away
1977	"O Brother!" b/w "Still Waters at Night"	—	—	—		Gulf Winds
1979	"Light a Light" b/w "Michael"	—	—	—		Honest Lullaby
1992	"Stones in the Road" b/w "Play Me Backwards" & "Edge of Glory"	—	—	—		Play Me Backwards
1997	"No Mermaid" b/w "Diamonds and Rust" (from Ring Them Bells)	—	—	—		Gone from Danger
"—" denotes releases that did not chart

== EPs ==
- Silver Dagger & Other Songs, Fontana (1961) UK
- With God on Our Side, Fontana (1963) UK
- Don't Think Twice, It's All Right, Fontana (1963) UK
- Luv Is the Foundation w/ Rocker-T (2009) US

== Video albums ==
- In Concert, Pioneer (VHS, Laserdisc 1990)
- Live at Sing Sing, NY 1972 (w/ B.B. King), (DVD 2004)
- Three Voices: Live in Concert (1988 concert w/ Konstantin Wecker & Mercedes Sosa), (DVD 2004)
- How Sweet the Sound, American Masters/Razor & Tie (DVD 2009)
- Golden Hits: Live Collection, Blueline (DVD 2013)
- Oh Freedom: Live in London, Hudson Street (DVD 2014)
- 75th Birthday Celebration, Razor & Tie (DVD 2016)

== Contributions ==
- Hard Rain by Bob Dylan (1976) - guitar, background vocals
- 4 Songs From Renaldo and Clara EP by Bob Dylan (1978) - vocals on "Never Let Me Go"
- The Butterfly Tree by Julia Butterfly Hill, Joan Baez, Joy Carlin, Berkeley Symphony Orchestra & Kent Nagano (2002) - vocals
- The Bootleg Series Vol. 5: Bob Dylan Live 1975, The Rolling Thunder Revue (2002) - vocals, acoustic guitar & percussion on 4 songs
- The Bootleg Series Vol. 6: Bob Dylan Live 1964, Concert at Philharmonic Hall (2004) - vocals on 4 songs
- Corazón libre by Mercedes Sosa (2005) - cover art
- Born to the Breed: A Tribute to Judy Collins (2008) - "Since You've Asked"
- Journey to the New World by Sharon Isbin, Joan Baez & Mark O'Connor (2009) - "Joan Baez Suite Op. 144" & "Go 'Way from My Window"
- Tune In, Turn Up, Sing Out by San Francisco Gay Men's Chorus (2009) - "Swingin with the Saints" & "Imagine"
- Bob Dylan – The Rolling Thunder Revue: The 1975 Live Recordings (2019) - vocals, acoustic guitar & percussion on 12 songs
- Als teus ulls by Mario Muñoz feat. Lluís Llach, Gemma Humet & Joan Baez (2019) - single
- No Kings by Jesse Welles (2025) - vocals
