= Portrait of Joan Baez =

Compilation album by Joan Baez
- Released: 1967
- Genre: Folk
- Label: Vanguard
- Producer: Maynard Solomon

Joan Baez chronology
| Joan (1967) | Portrait of Joan Baez (1967) | Baptism: A Journey Through Our Time (1968) |

Portrait of Joan Baez is the first compilation album by Joan Baez, released in the UK in 1967. It includes material from her early 1960s traditional folk and her Bob Dylan and Phil Ochs covers. The album is mono and was released on Vinyl in the UK. It features a mix of studio and live recordings.

== Track listing ==
1. "There But For Fortune" (Phil Ochs)
2. "Don't Think Twice, It's Alright" (Bob Dylan)
3. "The Trees They Do Grow High" (Traditional)
4. "Copper Kettle" (Albert Frank Beddoe)
5. "Mary Hamilton" (Traditional)
6. "Plaisir d'amour" (Jean-Pierre Claris de Florian/Jean-Paul-Égide Martini)
7. "Colours" (Donovan)
8. "Geordie" (Traditional)
9. "Farewell, Angelina" (Bob Dylan)
10. "All My Trials" (Traditional)
11. "It Ain't Me, Babe" (Bob Dylan)
12. "We Shall Overcome" (Guy Carawan, Frank Hamilton, Zilphia Horton, Pete Seeger)
