= William Barry Wood III =

American molecular and developmental biologist (1938–2024)

- Born: February 19, 1938; Baltimore, Maryland, U.S.
- Died: May 9, 2024 (aged 86); Boulder, Colorado, U.S.
- Education: Harvard University
- Known for: Molecular and developmental biology
- Awards: National Academy of Sciences Award in Molecular Biology
- Scientific career
- Fields: Molecular biology Developmental biology
- Workplaces: University of Colorado Boulder

William Barry Wood III (19 February 1938 – 9 May 2024) was an American molecular and developmental biologist who served as a professor at the University of Colorado Boulder. His research focused on the genetic and molecular mechanisms of axis formation and patterning during early development, and he made influential contributions to the emerging field of molecular developmental biology. Wood was elected to the National Academy of Sciences at a notably young age (age 34) and received the NAS Award in Molecular Biology in recognition of his scientific achievements.

While a graduate student, Wood was also active in the Cambridge, Massachusetts folk music scene and appeared as "Bill Wood" on the 1960 album Folksingers 'Round Harvard Square, which featured early performances by Joan Baez. Wood's two sons, Oliver and Chris Wood, are professional musicians who perform as the roots-rock band The Wood Brothers.

== Early life and education ==
William Barry Wood III was born on 19 February 1938 in Baltimore, Maryland. He was the son of William Barry Wood Jr., a microbiologist (and American football player) known for his work on antibiotics, including penicillin, and also a member of the National Academy of Sciences. The shared name and scientific careers of father and son have occasionally led to confusion in secondary sources, making the generational suffix an important point of distinction.

Wood pursued his undergraduate studies at Harvard University, where he developed interests in biology and genetics during a period of rapid growth in molecular biology. He remained at Harvard for graduate training, earning his doctoral degree in the life sciences, and was exposed to emerging experimental approaches that emphasized the molecular basis of development and gene regulation. This training was the basis for his later research on axis formation and patterning in early development.

After receiving his PhD from Stanford University in 1963 with Paul Berg, Wood carried out postdoctoral research with Werner Arber on bacteriophage and bacterial DNA. Their work helped clarify how bacteria restrict foreign DNA while protecting their own genomes, through the analysis of mutants defective in these processes. These studies contributed to the development of the restriction–modification model that was the basis of Arber's Nobel Prize in Physiology or Medicine in 1978.

== Scientific career ==
After completing his doctoral training, Wood began his academic career by joining the faculty of the University of Colorado Boulder, where he spent most of his professional life and eventually became a professor. Wood's appointments reflected the growing use of molecular approaches to address classical problems in development. His work and teaching focused on how gene activity controls early developmental processes. He remained at the University of Colorado Boulder until his retirement in 2008, after which he continued to follow developments in the field and maintain contact with colleagues.

== Research contributions ==
During his time at the California Institute of Technology, Wood worked closely with geneticist Robert S. Edgar on bacteriophage T4. Their collaboration combined biochemical and genetic approaches to dissect how complex viral structures are assembled inside bacterial cells. Using genetic analysis together with electron microscopy, they identified which viral components were encoded by individual phage genes and how gene products contributed to the ordered assembly of new virus particles. This work contributed to Wood's early election to the National Academy of Sciences.

Wood's research addressed fundamental questions about how spatial patterns are established during early development. He focused on the genetic and molecular mechanisms that define body axes and organize tissues in developing organisms; he was among the early practitioners of molecular developmental biology. At a time when developmental biology was shifting from descriptive embryology toward gene-based explanations, Wood's research helped link classical developmental problems with emerging molecular approaches.

His studies examined how gene expression is regulated in space and time during early developmental stages, contributing to broader understanding of how pattern formation is controlled at the molecular level. By combining genetic analysis with molecular methods, he provided insight into how regulatory genes influence developmental outcomes, work that influenced subsequent studies of axis formation and morphogenesis.

Wood's scientific contributions were recognized by his election to the National Academy of Sciences at a relatively young age and by the award of the NAS Award in Molecular Biology. Together, these honors reflected the impact of his work on the development of molecular approaches to studying early developmental processes.

== Honors and recognition ==
- NAS Award in Molecular Biology (1969)
- Elected to the National Academy of Sciences (1972)
- Guggenheim Fellowship (1975–1976)
- Elected to American Academy of Arts and Sciences (1976)
- Elected fellow, American Association for the Advancement of Science (1989)
- Alexander von Humboldt Senior Research Award (Forschungspreis) (2004)
- Viktor Hamburger Outstanding Educator Prize, Society for Developmental Biology (2013)
- Arthur Kornberg and Paul Berg Lifetime Achievement Award in Biomedical Sciences (2015)
