= The Contemporary Ballad Book =

Album by Joan Baez

Compilation album by Joan Baez
- Released: 1974
- Label: Vanguard

The Contemporary Ballad Book was a 1974 Joan Baez compilation, released by Vanguard after the success of the Joan Baez Ballad Book. Unlike the first Ballad Book, this one focused on singer-songwriter material, rather than traditional folk. This new compilation contained one previously unreleased track, the Italian song, C'era un ragazzo che come me amava i Beatles e i Rolling Stones ('There was this guy who, just like me, loved the Beatles and the Rolling Stones'), taken from Baez' performance at the Isle of Wight Festival.

== Track listing ==
1. "North Country Blues" (Bob Dylan)
2. "It Ain't Me, Babe" (Bob Dylan)
3. "Children of Darkness" (Richard Fariña)
4. "C'era Un Ragazzo Che Come Me Amava i Beatles e i Rolling Stones" (M. Lusini, F. Migliacci)
5. "Poor Wayfaring Stranger" (traditional)
6. "Birmingham Sunday" (Richard Fariña)
7. "San Francisco Mabel Joy" (Mickey Newbury)
8. "Be Not Too Hard" (Donovan)
9. "Restless Farewell" (Bob Dylan)
10. "Ranger's Command" (Woody Guthrie)
11. "Long Black Veil" (Marijohn Wilkin)
12. "Hickory Wind" (Gram Parsons)
13. "The Lady Came from Baltimore" (Tim Hardin)
14. "I Dreamed I Saw St. Augustine" (Bob Dylan)
15. "The Tramp on the Street" (traditional)
16. "Saigon Bride" (Joan Baez, Nina Duschek)
17. "Donna Donna" (Sholom Secunda, Aaron Zeitlin, A. Kevess, T. Schwartz)
18. "Song in the Blood" (Lawrence Ferlinghetti, Jacques Prévert)
19. "The Magic Wood" (Henry Treece)
20. "Babe, I'm Gonna Leave You" (A. Bredon)
