= Live Europe '83 =

Live album by Joan Baez
- Released: January 1984
- Recorded: Various dates on 1983 European concert tour
- Genre: Folk
- Length: 50:42
- Label: Ariola
- Producer: Gerard Tempesti

Joan Baez chronology
Honest Lullaby (1979)	Live Europe '83 (1984)	Joan Baez: Classics (1986)

Live Europe '83 is a 1984 live album by Joan Baez, taken from performances during her previous year's tour. It found Baez beginning to update her image (which she would continue to do on subsequent releases) by including songs like "Children of the Eighties" (her own composition, written for the children born after the 1960s) alongside old fan favorites like "A Hard Rain's a-Gonna Fall" and "Farewell Angelina". She subsequently rewrote some of the lyrics of "Warriors of the Sun", as can be heard on the version of the song that appears on 1989's Speaking of Dreams. The album was not released in the US, due to Baez's lack of a US recording contract at the time. The German version of the album substituted the German songs "Wozu sind Kriege da" and "Wenn unsere Brüder kommen" for the album's two French songs. It was also released in Canada on the Gamma label, and it was the Canadian version that most US fans purchased as an import.

Professional ratings
Review scores
Source	Rating
Allmusic	link

== Track listing ==
=== German edition ===
All tracks are written by Joan Baez, except where noted.

No.	Title	Writer(s)	Length
1.	"Farewell Angelina"	Bob Dylan	3:05
2.	"Warriors of the Sun"		4:18
3.	"A Hard Rain's A-Gonna Fall"	Bob Dylan	5:42
4.	"Lady Di and I"		4:40
5.	"Wozu sind Kriege da"	Udo Lindenberg	4:12
6.	"Wenn unsere Brüder kommen"	Konstantin Wecker	2:39
7.	"(For the) Children of the Eighties"		4:09
8.	"The Love Inside"	Barry Gibb	3:52
9.	"Me And Bobby McGee"	Kris Kristofferson, Fred Foster	3:32
10.	"No Woman, No Cry"	Bob Marley	3:46
11.	"Imagine"	John Lennon	3:16
12.	"Jaria Hamuda"	Ahmed Hamza	1:40
13.	"Here's to You"	Joan Baez, Ennio Morricone	2:31
14.	"Land of a Thousand Dances"	Antoine Domino, Chris Kenner	3:14

=== Canadian / French / Dutch / Portuguese / Argentinian / Australian / Italian / edition ===
All tracks are written by Joan Baez, except where noted.

No.	Title	Writer(s)	Length
1.	"Farewell Angelina"	Bob Dylan	3:05
2.	"Warriors of the Sun"		4:18
3.	"A Hard Rain's A-Gonna Fall"	Bob Dylan	5:42
4.	"Lady Di and I"		4:40
5.	"A Tous Les Enfants"	Boris Vian, Claude Vence	2:50
6.	"Prendre Un Enfant"	Yves Duteil	4:11
7.	"(For the) Children of the Eighties"		4:09
8.	"The Love Inside"	Barry Gibb	3:52
9.	"Me And Bobby McGee"	Kris Kristofferson, Fred Foster	3:32
10.	"No Woman, No Cry"	Bob Marley	3:46
11.	"Imagine"	John Lennon	3:16
12.	"Jaria Hamuda"	Ahmed Hamza	1:40
13.	"Here's to You"	Joan Baez, Ennio Morricone	2:31
14.	"Land of a Thousand Dances"	Antoine Domino, Chris Kenner	3:14

== Certifications and sales ==
Region	Certification	Certified units/sales
France (SNEP)	Platinum	400,000^{*}
^{*} Sales figures based on certification alone.
