= Joan Baez: Classics =

Greatest hits album by Joan Baez
- Released: November 1986
- Genre: Folk
- Length: 65:57
- Label: A&M
- Producer: Bernard Gelb

Joan Baez chronology
Live Europe '83 (1984)	Joan Baez: Classics (1986)	Recently (1987)

Joan Baez: Classics (Also known as Classics, Volume 8) is a 1986 compilation, focusing on her A&M period (1972–76). Released in the mid-1980s, the album was significant for being the first Joan Baez compilation to appear on CD, and remains one of the more comprehensive collections of her 1970's work. The CD was part of A&M's series of compilations from artists associated with their label to commemorate their 25th anniversary.

The album was re-released in 1996 as Joan Baez' Greatest Hits which contained the same track listing as Classics (along with the tracks "The Ballad of Sacco & Vanzetti," "Oh Happy Day," and "Less Than the Song"), as well as the same liner notes.

Professional ratings
Review scores
Source	Rating
Allmusic	link

== Track listing ==
1. "Diamonds & Rust" (Joan Baez)
2. "The Night They Drove Old Dixie Down" (Robbie Robertson)
3. "Simple Twist of Fate" (Bob Dylan)
4. "Imagine" (John Lennon)
5. "In the Quiet Morning" (Mimi Fariña)
6. "Best of Friends" (Fariña)
7. "Forever Young" (Dylan)
8. "Prison Trilogy (Billy Rose)" (Baez)
9. "Jesse" (Janis Ian)
10. "Children and All That Jazz" (Baez)
11. "Please Come to Boston" (Dave Loggins)
12. "Never Dreamed You'd Leave in Summer" (Stevie Wonder/Syreeta Wright)
13. "Gracias A la Vida" (Violeta Parra)
14. "Sweeter for Me" (Baez)
15. "Love Song to a Stranger" (Baez)
16. "Dida" (Baez)
17. "Amazing Grace" (Traditional)
