= Baptism: A Journey Through Our Time =

Studio album by Joan Baez
- Released: June 1968
- Recorded: 1968
- Studios: Vanguard, New York City
- Genre: Folk
- Length: 40:40
- Label: Vanguard VSD-79275
- Producer: Maynard Solomon

Joan Baez chronology
Joan (1967)	Baptism: A Journey Through Our Time (1968)	Any Day Now (1968)

Professional ratings
Review scores
Source	Rating
AllMusic	link
Rolling Stone	(positive)

Baptism: A Journey Through Our Time is the eighth studio album of poetry spoken and sung by American singer-songwriter Joan Baez, released in 1968. Composer-conductor Peter Schickele (of P. D. Q. Bach fame) did the orchestration, as he had on Baez's previous albums Noël (1966) and Joan (1967).

The album was released during a time when many folk, pop and rock artists were experimenting with mixing their music with classical orchestration (e.g. the Beatles, Judy Collins, the Rolling Stones).

== Track listing ==
=== Side 1 ===
1. "Old Welsh Song" (Henry Treece)
2. "I Saw the Vision of Armies" (Walt Whitman)
3. "Minister of War" (Arthur Waley)
4. "Song in the Blood" (Lawrence Ferlinghetti, Jacques Prévert)
5. "Casida of the Lament" (J.L. Gili, Federico García Lorca)
6. "Of the Dark Past" (James Joyce)
7. "London" (William Blake)
8. "In Guernica" (Norman Rosten)
9. "Who Murdered the Minutes" (Henry Treece)
10. "Oh, Little Child" (Henry Treece)
11. "No Man Is an Island" (John Donne)

=== Side 2 ===
1. "Portrait of the Artist as a Young Man" (James Joyce)
2. "All the Pretty Little Horses" (Traditional)
3. "Childhood III" (Arthur Rimbaud, Louis Varese)
4. "The Magic Wood" (Henry Treece)
5. "Poems from the Japanese" (Kenneth Rexroth)
6. "Colours" (Peter Levi, Robin Milner-Gulland, Yevgeny Yevtushenko)
7. "All in green went my love riding" (E. E. Cummings)
8. "Gacela of the Dark Death" (Federico García Lorca, Stephen Spender)
9. "The Parable of the Old Man and the Young" (Wilfred Owen)
10. "Evil" (N. Cameron, Arthur Rimbaud)
11. "Epitaph for a Poet" (Countee Cullen)
12. "Mystic Numbers- 36"
13. "When the Shy Star Goes Forth in Heaven" (James Joyce)
14. "The Angel" (William Blake)
15. "Old Welsh Song" (Henry Treece)

== Personnel ==
- Joan Baez – vocals, guitar
- Peter Schickele – composer, conductor

== Chart positions ==
Year	Chart	Position
1968	Billboard Pop Albums	84
