= Live at Newport (Joan Baez album) =

Live album by Joan Baez
- Released: September 17, 1996
- Recorded: 1963–1965
- Genre: Folk
- Length: 65:38
- Label: Vanguard

Joan Baez chronology
Ring Them Bells (1995)	Live at Newport (1996)	Gone from Danger (1997)

Professional ratings
Review scores
Source	Rating
Allmusic	3/5 stars

Live at Newport is a live album by American singer and musician Joan Baez, released in 1996. It includes performance from 1963, 1964 and 1965 at the Newport Folk Festival in Newport, Rhode Island.

The final two tracks are duets with Bob Dylan.

== Track listings ==
1. "Farewell, Angelina" (Bob Dylan) – 3:41
2. "Long Black Veil" (Marijohn Wilkin, Danny Dill) – 3:11
3. "Wild Mountain Thyme" (Francis McPeake) - 4:48
4. "Come All You Fair and Tender Maidens" (Public Domain) - 3:57
5. "Lonesome Valley" (Traditional) - 3:39
6. "Hush Little Baby" (Public Domain) – 1:07
7. "Te Ador/Te Manha" (Jungnickle, Traditional) – 3:57
8. "All My Trials" (Traditional) - 4:38
9. "It's All Over Now, Baby Blue" (Dylan) – 3:55
10. "The Unquiet Grave" (Traditional) - 3:03
11. "Oh, Freedom" (Traditional) - 3:15
12. "Satisfied Mind" (Jack Rhodes) - 3:13
13. "Fennario" (Public Domain) – 3:47
14. "Don't Think Twice, It's All Right" (Dylan) – 3:37
15. "Johnny Cuckoo" (Bessie Jones) – 4:28
16. "It Ain't Me Babe" (Dylan) – 4:45
17. "With God on Our Side" (Dylan) – 6:37

== Personnel ==
- Joan Baez – vocals, guitar
- Everett Lilly – bass
- Bob Dylan – guitar, vocals
- Peter Yarrow – guitar, vocals
- Mary Travers – vocals
