= The Joan Baez Lovesong Album =

Compilation album by Joan Baez
- Released: 1976
- Label: Vanguard

Professional ratings
Review scores
Source	Rating
The Encyclopedia of Popular Music	3/5 stars
MusicHound Folk: The Essential Album Guide	3/5 stars
The New Rolling Stone Record Guide	3/5 stars

The Joan Baez Lovesong Album is a 1976 compilation of Joan Baez songs. Vanguard Records put it together as part of its Baez reissue series, after Baez left the label for A&M Records. The album is a collection of love songs, including traditional and contemporary work, as well as an arrangement of E. E. Cummings' "All in Green My Love Went Riding" by Peter Schickele. The cover painting is by the painter and musician Eric Von Schmidt.

== Critical reception ==
The New Rolling Stone Album Guide, from 2004, retained the 1983 guide's 3-star rating, writing that the album remains an "admirable" collection of Baez's early work. Folk Review called the album "not quite so awful as it sounds," writing that a listener can "rediscover why Joan Baez was a leading folksinger a decade ago."

== Track listing ==
1. "Come All Ye Fair And Tender Ladies" (traditional)
2. "Love Minus Zero/No Limit" (Bob Dylan)
3. "Sweet Sir Galahad" (Joan Baez)
4. "Love Is Just a Four-Letter Word" (Bob Dylan)
5. "Wild Mountain Thyme" (traditional)
6. "The Lass From The Low Country" (John Jacob Niles)
7. "Sad-Eyed Lady of the Lowlands" (Bob Dylan)
8. "Plaisir d'Amour" (Martini Il Tedesco)
9. "House Carpenter" (traditional)
10. "Once I Had A Sweetheart" (traditional)
11. "Danger Waters" (Hold Me Tight) (J. Browne)
12. "The River In The Pines" (traditional)
13. "Turquoise" (Donovan)
14. "The Death Of Queen Jane" (traditional)
15. "All In Green Went My Love Riding" (E. E. Cummings)
16. "Once I Knew A Pretty Girl" (traditional)
17. "The Unquiet Grave" (traditional)
18. "So We'll Go No More A"-Roving (traditional)
