= Joan Baez: I Am a Noise =

2023 documentary film

- Theatrical release poster
- Directed by: Miri Navasky; Maeve O'Boyle; Karen O'Connor
- Produced by: Miri Navasky; Karen O'Connor
- Edited by: Maeve O'Boyle
- Music by: Sarah Lynch
- Production company: Mead Street Films
- Distributed by: Magnolia Pictures
- Release dates: February 17, 2023 (Berlinale); October 6, 2023 (US)
- Running time: 113 minutes
- Country: United States
- Language: English
- Box office: $728,006 (worldwide)

Joan Baez: I Am a Noise is a 2023 American documentary film about singer-songwriter and activist Joan Baez. Directed by Miri Navasky, Karen O'Connor, and Maeve O'Boyle, the film utilizes previously unreleased home movies, artwork, diaries, therapy tapes, and audio recordings related to Baez.

Joan Baez: I Am a Noise had its world premiere at the 73rd Berlin International Film Festival on February 17, 2023. It received a theatrical release in the United States on October 6, 2023, by Magnolia Pictures.

== Reception ==
On the review aggregator website Rotten Tomatoes, the film has an approval rating of 94% based on 52 reviews, with an average rating of 7.6/10. The critics' consensus reads: "Absorbing purely as a chronicle of her remarkable career, Joan Baez: I Am a Noise is also moving as a depiction of one woman's personal journey from pain to peace and forgiveness." On Metacritic, the film has a weighted average score of 75 out of 100, based on 8 critics, indicating "generally favorable" reviews.
