= Bowery Ballroom =

Music venue in Manhattan, New York

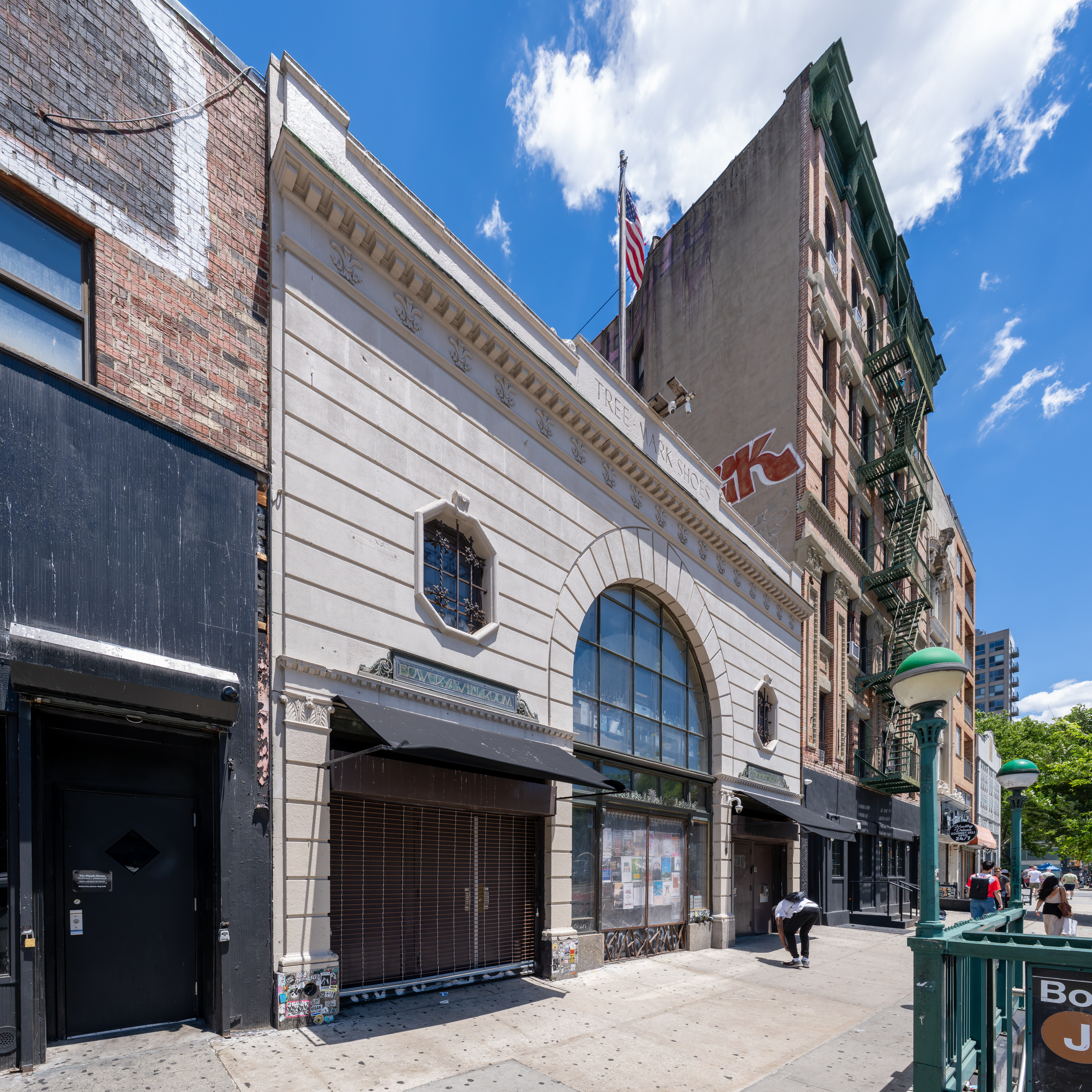
- The Bowery Ballroom in 2026
- Interactive map of Bowery Ballroom
- Address: 6 Delancey Street
- Location: New York, NY 10002
- Coordinates: 40.7204°N 73.9934°W
- Owner: Michael Swier, Michael Winsch, Brian Swier
- Seating type: Standing-room only
- Capacity: 575
- Type: Nightclub, live music venue
- Public transit: New York City Subway: at Bowery; New York City Bus: M103

Construction
- Built: 1929
- Opened: 1998
- Renovated: 1997
- Architect: Brian Swier

Website
- boweryballroom.com

The Bowery Ballroom is a live music venue at 6 Delancey Street in Lower Manhattan, New York City. The venue has enjoyed a fabled reputation among musicians as well as audiences. In 2013, industry insiders polled by Rolling Stone magazine named it the best club in America, describing it as "both intimate and grand, with consistently great sound and sightlines, and touches of old-school class." Consequence of Sound named it the second-best music venue in the United States.

It has a capacity of 575 people.

== History ==
The Bowery Ballroom was founded in 1998 by Michael Swier, Michael Winsch, and Brian Swier, who still own and operate the business. The club was the team's second music venue after The Mercury Lounge.

The building at 6 Delancey Street was built to be a high-end shoe store and haberdashery just before the devastating Wall Street crash of 1929. It stood vacant until the end of World War II, when it housed a series of shops. Over time the neighborhood declined. In 1998 the building was fully renovated to become The Bowery Ballroom.

Cofounder Michael Swier told the Village Voice and LA Weekly that he and his partners' goals have always been about quality of sound, as well as giving the best experience to both artists and the audience.

Architect and cofounder Brian Swier designed the venue and directed renovations of the historic building with an eye to optimal acoustics for live music. Today the club is one of the rare remaining independent music venues, and continues to be regarded as one of the best for music purists. Gothamist and Thrillist have named it one of New York City's best music venues.

"From the beginning, opening the Mercury Lounge, it was all about the stage and the music – for the band, for the people coming to see the bands", Michael Swier told LA Weekly. "Whether it's the sound system, the acoustic treatment, the way the band sounds to themselves onstage, the sightlines – it was all about that. That reputation of building really good clubs and treating both bands and patrons with the respect they deserve and putting the focus on that kind of grew out of those things."

A detailed scholarly account of the venue and its place in the wider music and cultural history of New York City was published in 2020.

== Notable acts ==
Patti Smith performed New Year's Eve at the Bowery Ballroom for fourteen consecutive years.

The venue has hosted numerous acts of note, including R.E.M., Coldplay, Quicksand, Kanye West, Lou Reed, Glaive, Joan Jett, Radiohead, Tony Bennett, the Roots, Lana Del Rey, Måneskin, the Black Keys, Red Hot Chili Peppers, Pixies, the White Stripes, Metallica, Robert Plant, Arcade Fire, the Killers, Idina Menzel, Lady Gaga, Amy Winehouse, the Dandy Warhols, the Strokes, Broken Social Scene, They Might Be Giants, Lucky Chops, Yo La Tengo, Twenty One Pilots, Frank Ocean, Getting Started, and Paul McCartney.

== In media ==
The Bowery Ballroom is the namesake of Joan Baez's Bowery Songs album, recorded live at the venue on November 6, 2004. It appears in the 2000 film Coyote Ugly as well as the 2008 film Nick & Norah's Infinite Playlist.
