= Dark Chords on a Big Guitar =

Studio album by Joan Baez
- Released: September 9, 2003
- Recorded: January - April 2003
- Studio: Allaire, Shokan, New York
- Genre: Folk
- Length: 44:38
- Label: Koch
- Producer: Mark Spector

Joan Baez chronology
Gone from Danger (1997)	Dark Chords on a Big Guitar (2003)	Bowery Songs (2005)

Professional ratings
Review scores
Source	Rating
AllMusic	4/5 stars

Dark Chords on a Big Guitar is the twenty-fourth studio album (and twenty-sixth overall) by Joan Baez, released in September 2003. The album is more rock-oriented than her prior releases and contains songs by Natalie Merchant, Ryan Adams, Steve Earle, and others. The title was taken from a line in Greg Brown's song "Rexroth's Daughter". Critics and listeners were surprised that Baez's voice had lost little of its original power and beauty, given that she was sixty-two when she made the album.

The album, produced by Mark Spector, was recorded at Allaire Studios, Shokan, New York, from January to April 2003. Backing musicians included George Javori and Duke McVinnie.

Baez dedicated the album to Michael Moore.

== Track listing ==
1. "Sleeper" (Greg Brown) – 4:35
2. "In My Time of Need" (Ryan Adams) – 4:33
3. "Rosemary Moore" (Caitlin Cary) – 5:15
4. "Caleb Meyer" (Gillian Welch, David Rawlings) – 2:31
5. "Motherland" (Natalie Merchant) – 4:44
6. "Wings" (Josh Ritter) – 4:01
7. "Rexroth's Daughter" (Greg Brown) – 5:19
8. "Elvis Presley Blues" (Gillian Welch, David Rawlings) – 4:40
9. "King's Highway" (Joe Henry) – 3:28
10. "Christmas in Washington" (Steve Earle) – 5:13

== Personnel ==
- Rani Arbo – Background Vocals
- Greg Calbi – Mastering
- Steve Chadie – Assistant Engineer
- Matthew Cullen – Assistant Engineer
- Gail Ann Dorsey – Background Vocals
- James Harley – Assistant Engineer
- Byron Isaacs – Electric & Acoustic Bass
- George Javori – Drums
- Brandon Mason – Engineer, Mixing
- Duke McVinnie – Guitar, Bass
- Norman Moore – Art Direction, Design, Photography
- Doug Pettibone – Acoustic Guitar
- Bo Ramsey – Producer
- Mark Spector – Producer
- Greg Tobler – Assistant Engineer
- Tom Tucker – Engineer
- Dana Tynan – Photography

== Charts ==
Chart	Peak position
US Independent Albums (Billboard)	39
UK Independent Albums (OCC)	29
