= Blowin' Away =

Studio album by Joan Baez
- Released: June 1977
- Recorded: 1977
- Genre: Folk
- Length: 40:24
- Label: Portrait
- Producer: David Kershenbaum

Joan Baez chronology
Gulf Winds (1976)	Blowin' Away (1977)	Best of Joan C. Baez (1977)

Professional ratings
Review scores
Source	Rating
AllMusic	2/5 stars
MusicHound Folk: The Essential Album Guide	3/5 stars
Music Week	2/4 stars
The Rolling Stone Album Guide	3/5 stars

Blowin' Away is a studio album by Joan Baez, released in 1977. It was her first after switching from A&M Records to Portrait Records (a then newly created division of CBS Records). It peaked at No. 54 on the Billboard 200.

== Overview ==
The album veered more toward mainstream pop than any album Baez had recorded up to that point, though many critics at the time pointed out that she seemed not entirely comfortable with her "new sound". Among the songs covered were the Rod Stewart hit "Sailing", and the standard "Cry Me a River", in addition to a number of Baez' own compositions. The sardonic "Time Rag" recounts an aborted attempt at an interview by a Time reporter. Throughout the course of the song, she admits that studio executives wanted to spruce up her image to ensure that she'd once again sell well. "I really should tell you that deep in my heart/I don't give a damn where I stand on the charts", she wryly comments toward the song's closing. Baez later claimed that "Time Rag" was a rap song of sorts.

From "Time Rag":

"Curious about his interest, I babbled my way through the worldwide list; Ireland, Chile and the African states; Poetry, politics and how they relate; Motherhood, music and Moog synthesizers; Political prisoners and Commie sympathizers; Hetero, homo and bisexuality; Where they all stand in the nineteen-seventies."

Baez wrote "Altar Boy and the Thief" as a tribute to her gay fanbase.

In her autobiography, "And a Voice to Sing With", Baez described Blowin' Away as "a good album with a terrible cover".

== Track listing ==
All tracks composed by Joan Baez; except where indicated

1. "Sailing" (Gavin Sutherland) – 4:22
2. "Many a Mile to Freedom" (Steve Winwood, Anna Capaldi) – 2:58
3. "Miracles" – 5:24
4. "Yellow Coat" (Steve Goodman) – 3:37
5. "Time Rag" – 5:25
6. "A Heartfelt Line or Two" – 3:23
7. "I'm Blowin' Away" (Eric Kaz) – 3:18
8. "Luba the Baroness" – 7:06
9. "Altar Boy and the Thief" – 3:28
10. "Cry Me a River" (Arthur Hamilton) – 3:00

== Personnel ==
- Joan Baez – Guitar, Vocals
- David Kershenbaum – Producer
- String arrangements – Tom Scott
- Drums – Mike Botts, Rick Shlosser
- Drums – Jim Gordon on (Luba the Baroness)
- Bass guitar – Donald "Duck" Dunn, Wilton Felder
- Electric guitar – Dean Parks
- Keyboards – Larry Knechtel, Joe Sample
- Acoustic guitar, electric guitar – Elliott Randall
- Percussion – Mike Botts
- Steel guitar – Jeff Baxter
- Violin, Mandolin, Steel guitar – David Mansfield
