= Folksingers 'Round Harvard Square =

Studio album by Joan Baez, Bill Wood, Ted Alevizos
- Released: 1960
- Recorded: Boston, May 1959
- Genres: Folk, Negro spiritual, Greek traditional music
- Length: 46:37
- Languages: English, French, Greek
- Label: Veritas
- Producer: Lemuel Marshall Wells

Joan Baez chronology
Folksingers 'Round Harvard Square (1960)	Joan Baez (1960)

Folksingers 'Round Harvard Square is a collaborative folk album featuring Joan Baez, Bill Wood and Ted Alevizos; it is also Baez's debut appearance as six of the eighteen tracks were solos by her. The album was recorded by Stephen Fassett in "a friend's basement studio" in Boston, May 1959.

In 1963, an unauthorized reissue of the album was released on Squire Records as The Best of Joan Baez (minus four tracks that did not contain Baez' vocals — "Le Cheval dans la baignoire," "The Bold Soldier," "Lass from the Low Country" and "Rejected Lover"), but was withdrawn after Baez took legal action against it (by which time the album had already made the top-fifty on the U.S. albums charts).

Harvard Square is a place in Cambridge, Massachusetts; Baez had a residence at Club 47, located on the square.

== Track listing ==
All songs traditional, except where noted.

Side one
No.	Title	Performers	Length
1.	"On the Banks of the Ohio"	Baez	2:40
2.	"O What a Beautiful City" (Spiritual)	Baez	3:21
3.	"Sail Away Ladies"	Baez	2:49
4.	"Black Is the Color"	Baez	2:42
5.	"Lowlands"	Baez	2:48
6.	"What You Gonna Call Your Pretty Little Baby" (Spiritual)	Baez	2:30
7.	"Kitty" (South African folksong)	Baez & Wood	2:01
8.	"So Soon in the Morning" (Spiritual)	Baez & Wood	2:08
9.	"Careless Love" (Spiritual)	Baez & Wood	2:27
Total length:			23:26

Side two
No.	Title	Performers	Length
1.	"Le Cheval dans la baignoire (The Horse in the Bathtub)" (Stephen Coleman)	Wood	2:08
2.	"John Henry"	Wood	3:17
3.	"Travellin' Shoes"	Wood	2:13
4.	"The Bold Soldier"	Wood	1:53
5.	"Walie Walie" (Appalachian folksong)	Alevizos	2:02
6.	"Rejected Lover" (Spiritual)	Alevizos	3:28
7.	"Astrapsen–The Sun Is Risen" (Traditional Greek)	Alevizos	1:46
8.	"Lass from the Low Country" (North Carolina folksong)	Alevizos	3:11
9.	"Don't Weep After Me" (Trad. West Indian folksong)	Baez–Wood–Alevizos	2:49
Total length:			23:11
