= Gulf Winds =

Studio album by Joan Baez
- Released: November 1976
- Recorded: 1976
- Studio: Sound Labs, Los Angeles; synthesizers at TONTO, Santa Monica
- Genre: Folk
- Length: 44:05
- Label: A&M
- Producer: David Kershenbaum

Joan Baez chronology
From Every Stage (1976)	Gulf Winds (1976)	Blowin' Away (1977)

Professional ratings
Review scores
Source	Rating
Allmusic	1.5/5 stars

Gulf Winds is the seventeenth studio album (and nineteenth overall) by Joan Baez, released in 1976. It was her final album of new material for A&M. Baez stated in her autobiography, And a Voice to Sing With, that most of the songs were written while on tour with the Rolling Thunder Revue with Bob Dylan. "O Brother!" was a clever reply to Dylan's song "Oh Sister". On the title song, a ten-minute long autobiographical recollection of her childhood, Baez accompanies herself only with her own acoustic guitar (the rest of the album features standard mid-1970s pop/rock backup), creating a sound reminiscent of her earliest pure folk recordings.

Gulf Winds is the only Baez album without any covers; each song was written by Baez herself.

From the album's liner notes:

"Sometimes, I wake up at night and write a song. Sometimes a tune comes to my head when I'm walking in the hills, and I have to make up words for it. Sometimes I sit in a bar in San Francisco and scribble into a notepad what I call my 'streams of unconsciousness.' When I have enough scribbles in the pad, and enough tunes in my head, I go into the studio and make an album. That's how I made this one."

- Joan Baez

== Track listing ==
All tracks composed by Joan Baez

Side one

1. "Sweeter for Me" – 4:25
2. "Seabirds" – 4:32
3. "Caruso" – 3:42
4. "Still Waters at Night" – 3:01
5. "Kingdom of Childhood" – 7:51

Side two

1. "O Brother!" – 3:19
2. "Time Is Passing Us By" – 3:43
3. "Stephanie's Room" – 4:05
4. "Gulf Winds" – 10:29

== Personnel ==
- Joan Baez – vocals, acoustic guitar, piano, synthesizer
- Donald Dunn – bass guitar
- Jim Gordon – drums
- Ray Kelley – cello
- Jesse Ehrlich – cello
- Larry Knechtel – acoustic and electric piano, organ
- Dean Parks – acoustic and electric guitar, mandolin, string arrangements, conductor
- Sid Sharp – violin
- Malcolm Cecil – synthesizer effects, synthesizer programming

Technical

- Tommy Vicari – mix engineer
- Bernard Gelb – executive producer
- Roland Young – art direction
- Chuck Beeson – design
- Johanna Van Zantwyk – photography

"Special thanks to Carlos Bernal"

== Chart positions ==
Year	Chart	Position
1976	The Billboard 200	62
