= Gone from Danger =

Studio album by Joan Baez
- Released: September 23, 1997
- Recorded: Nashville, 1997
- Genre: Folk
- Length: 48:22
- Label: Guardian
- Producers: Wally Wilson, Kenny Greenberg

Joan Baez chronology
Live at Newport (1996)	Gone from Danger (1997)	Dark Chords on a Big Guitar (2003)

Professional ratings
Review scores
Source	Rating
AllMusic	link
Uncut	4/5 stars

Gone from Danger is the twenty-third studio album (and twenty-fifth overall) by Joan Baez, released in September 1997. Rather than relying on her own songwriting, Baez instead selected work by younger folk and rock artists to perform. She included Dar Williams' "If I Wrote You", Richard Shindell's "Reunion Hill", and Betty Elders' "Crack in the Mirror" as well as two Sinéad Lohan compositions. Around the time of the album's release, Baez confessed that she no longer found herself able to write songs and felt more comfortable reverting to her original role, as an interpreter. The one track for which she receives credit, "Lily" (about a girlhood friend), was a poem written by Baez, to which Greenberg and Wilson added music.

In addition to giving the young songwriters a career boost by recording their songs, Baez took two of them—Shindell and Williams—on tour with her in 1997 to support the album. Lohan had previously supported Baez on tour in the UK in June 1996.

Initial limited editions of this album, available only at Borders bookstores in the US, included a bonus CD of two songs: Betty Elders' "Long Bed from Kenya" and a duet with Dar Williams on Paul Simon's "Dangling Conversation", both of which were recorded live at the 1997 Newport Folk Festival.

In 2009 a "Collector's Edition" of the original 10-track album was re-issued in a 2-CD set. The second disc features 11 tracks recorded live at Mountain Stage in August 1997, eight of which are from the original Gone From Danger album. The original songwriters join Joan on stage.

== Track listing ==
1. "No Mermaid" (Sinéad Lohan) – 4:22
2. "Reunion Hill" (Richard Shindell) – 4:08
3. "Crack in the Mirror" (Betty Elders) – 5:49
4. "February" (Dar Williams) – 4:11
5. "If I Wrote You" (Dar Williams) – 4:46
6. "Fishing" (Richard Shindell) – 3:28
7. "Lily" (Joan Baez, Wally Wilson, Kenny Greenberg) – 3:52
8. "Who Do You Think I Am" (Sinéad Lohan]) – 4:02
9. "Mercy Bound" (Mark Addison) – 4:51
10. "Money for Floods" (Richard Shindell) – 3:32

Bonus disc, recorded live at Mountain Stage in August 1997, as part of the 2-CD reissue in 2009:

1. "If I Wrote You" (Dar Williams)
2. "No Mermaid" (Sinéad Lohan)
3. "Reunion Hill" (Richard Shindell)
4. "Crack in the Mirror" (Betty Elders)
5. "Long Bed from Kenya" (Betty Elders)
6. "February" (Dar Williams)
7. "You're Aging Well" (Dar Williams)
8. "Fishing" (Richard Shindell)
9. "Money for Floods" (Richard Shindell)
10. "Who Do You Think I Am" (Sinéad Lohan)
11. "To Ramona" (Bob Dylan)

== Personnel ==
- Joan Baez – vocals, guitar, percussion
- Richard Bennett – bouzouki, acoustic guitar, electric guitar
- Dennis Bernside – keyboards
- Jim Collins – backing vocals
- Steve Conn – accordion
- Chad Cromwell – drums, percussion
- Eric Darken – percussion
- Dan Dugmore – resonator guitar, acoustic guitar, electric guitar, lap steel guitar, pedal steel guitar
- Betty Elders – guitar, vocals
- Kenny Greenberg – resonator guitar, acoustic guitar, electric guitar, percussion
- Jim Hoke – saxophone
- Marabeth Jordan – backing vocals
- Tim Lauer – harmonium, keyboards
- Allison Moorer – backing vocals
- Greg Morrow – drums, percussion
- Steve Nathan – keyboards
- Michael Rhodes – bass guitar
- Sharon Rice – backing vocals
- Matt Rollings – keyboards
- Joe Spivey – fiddle, mandolin
- Willie Weeks – bass guitar
- Dar Williams – guitar, backing vocals
- Wally Wilson – piano, percussion
- Curtis Young – backing vocals
