= Bowery Songs =

Live album by Joan Baez
- Released: September 6, 2005
- Recorded: November 6, 2004 at the Bowery Ballroom, New York, NY
- Genre: Folk
- Length: 64:25
- Label: Koch

Joan Baez chronology
Dark Chords on a Big Guitar (2003)	Bowery Songs (2005)	Day After Tomorrow (2008)

Professional ratings
Review scores
Source	Rating
Allmusic	link

Bowery Songs is a live album by American singer and musician Joan Baez, released in 2005. It was recorded during Baez' set at Manhattan's Bowery Ballroom.

== Track listings ==
1. "Finlandia" (Jean Sibelius, Georgia Harkness, Lloyd Stone) – 2:08
2. "Rexroth's Daughter" (Greg Brown) – 5:00
3. "Deportee (Plane Wreck at Los Gatos)" (Woody Guthrie, Martin Hoffman) – 5:24
4. "Joe Hill" (Alfred Hayes, Earl Robinson) – 4:18
5. "Christmas in Washington" (Steve Earle) – 5:17
6. "Farewell, Angelina" (Bob Dylan) – 3:36
7. "Motherland" (Natalie Merchant) – 5:16
8. "Carrickfergus" (traditional, Alan Connaught) –5:41
9. "Jackaroe" (traditional) –5:07
10. "Seven Curses" (Dylan) –5:26
11. "Dink's Song" (traditional) –4:37
12. "Silver Dagger" (traditional) – 3:52
13. "It's All Over Now, Baby Blue" (Dylan) – 4:26
14. "Jerusalem" (Earle) – 4:17

== Personnel ==
- Joan Baez – vocals, guitar
- George Javori – drums, percussion
- Graham Maby – bass, background vocals
- Duke McVinnie – guitar, background vocals
- Erik Della Penna – banjo, guitar, lap steel guitar, background vocals
