= The Joan Baez Ballad Book =

Compilation album by Joan Baez
- Released: 1972
- Genre: Folk
- Label: Vanguard

The Joan Baez Ballad Book was a 1972 compilation of traditional folk material, culled from Joan Baez' first five Vanguard albums. Initially issued as a two-record set, the two records were re-released separately a few years later as "Volume 1" and "Volume 2". Cover painting was by folk musician and painter Eric Von Schmidt. Though Ballad Book has since been supplanted by the reissue of most of Baez' original Vanguard catalog, for a number of years, it remained the only source to obtain a number of these cuts, as most of her early Vanguard albums temporarily went out of print in the early 1980s.

It peaked at No. 188 on the Billboard 200 chart.

== Track listing ==
1. "East Virginia" (traditional)
2. "Henry Martin" (traditional)
3. "All My Trials" (traditional)
4. "Old Blue" (traditional)
5. "House of the Rising Sun" (traditional)
6. "Wagoner's Lad"
7. "Black Is the Color of My True Love's Hair" (traditional)
8. "Lily of the West" (traditional)
9. "Silkie" (traditional)
10. "The House Carpenter" (traditional)
11. "The Trees They Do Grow High" (traditional)
12. "Fare Thee Well" (10,000 Miles) (traditional)
13. "Barbara Allen" (traditional)
14. "Jack-A-Roe" (traditional)
15. "John Riley" (traditional)
16. "Matty Groves" (traditional)
17. "Queen of Hearts" (traditional)
18. "Fennario" (traditional)
19. "Go 'Way from My Window" (John Jacob Niles)
20. "Railroad Boy" (traditional)
21. "Mary Hamilton" (traditional)
22. "Once I Had a Sweetheart" (traditional)
23. "Silver Dagger" (traditional)

== Charts ==
Chart (1972)	Peak position
US Billboard Top LPs & Tape	188
