= Diamonds & Rust in the Bullring =

Live album by Joan Baez
- Released: December 1988
- Recorded: Bilbao, Spain, 1988
- Genre: Folk
- Length: 36:19
- Label: Gold Castle
- Producer: Alan Abrahams

Joan Baez chronology
| Recently (1987) | Diamonds & Rust in the Bullring (1988) | Speaking of Dreams (1989) |

Diamonds & Rust in the Bullring is a Joan Baez album, recorded live in the bullring of Bilbao, Spain. It featured twelve songs, six of which were performed in English, five in Spanish and one - "Txoria Txori" - in Basque. Most of the songs had been performed and recorded by Baez previously, with the exception of Leonard Cohen's "Famous Blue Raincoat", Sting's "Ellas Danzan Solas" and the aforementioned Basque number.

"Gracias a la Vida" is a duet with singer Mercedes Sosa.

Professional ratings
Review scores
| Source | Rating |
|---|---|
| Allmusic | link |

== Track listing ==
1. "Diamonds & Rust" (Joan Baez) – 3:45
2. "Ain't Gonna Let Nobody Turn Me Around" (Traditional) – 1:22
3. "No Woman, No Cry" (Bob Marley) – 3:45
4. "Famous Blue Raincoat" (Leonard Cohen) – 4:58
5. "Swing Low, Sweet Chariot" (Traditional) – 3:41
6. "Let It Be" (John Lennon/Paul McCartney) – 3:59
7. "El Preso Numero Nueve" (Hermanos Cantoral) – 3:14
8. "Llegó Con Tres Heridas" (Miguel Hernández) – 2:38
9. "Txoria Txori" (J. A. Arze/M. Laboa) – 2:54
10. "Ellas Danzan Solas" (Cueca Sola) (R.Livi/Sting) – 5:35
11. "Gracias a la Vida" (Violeta Parra) – 6:05
12. "No Nos Moverán" (Traditional) – 1:22

== Personnel ==
- Alan V. Abrahams – producer, mixing
- John Acosta – cello
- Begnat Amorena – drums
- Laythan Armor – synthesizer, keyboards
- Joan Baez – arranger, liner notes, artwork, illustrations
- Marlene Bergman – design, cover design
- Cesar Cancino – piano, arranger, cello arrangement
- Jean Marie Ecay – guitar
- Jose Agustin Guereu – bass
- Charles Paakkari – mixing
- Costel Restea – cello
- Mercedes Sosa – vocals
- L. A. Mass Choir – vocals on "Let It Be"
- Donald Taylor – director, choir director, choir master
- Wally Traugott – mastering
