= Speaking of Dreams =

Studio album by Joan Baez
- Released: November 1989
- Recorded: 1989
- Genre: Folk
- Label: Gold Castle
- Producer: Alan Abrahams

Joan Baez chronology
Diamonds & Rust in the Bullring (1988)	Speaking of Dreams (1989)	Play Me Backwards (1992)

Speaking of Dreams is the twenty-first studio album (and twenty-third overall) by Joan Baez, released in 1989. It mixed personal compositions like the title song with political statements like "China", which was inspired by the Tiananmen Square protests of 1989. (Baez also dedicated the album to the students of Tiananmen Square who "nonviolently, and at an enormous price, have changed the face of China forever.") The album featured collaborations with Paul Simon, Jackson Browne and the Gipsy Kings, and marked the beginning of a period where Baez notes she put her music ahead of the political activism that had preoccupied her for much of the prior decade.

Professional ratings
Review scores
Source	Rating
Allmusic	link

== Track listing ==
1. "China" (Joan Baez)
2. "Warriors of the Sun" (Baez)
3. "Carrickfergus" (traditional, Alan Connaught)
4. "Hand to Mouth" (George Michael)
5. "Speaking of Dreams" (Baez)
6. "El Salvador" (Gregory Copeland) (duet with Jackson Browne)
7. "Rambler Gambler/Whispering Bells" (traditional, Fred Lowry, Clarence Quick) (duet with Paul Simon)
8. "Fairfax County" (David Massengill)
9. "A Mi Manera (My Way)" (Claude François/ Jacques Revaux/ Gilles Thibaut/ engl. Paul Anka) (with the Gipsy Kings)
