= Farewell, Angelina =

Studio album by Joan Baez
- Released: October 1965
- Recorded: 1965
- Genre: Folk
- Length: 43:18
- Label: Vanguard VSD-79200
- Producer: Maynard Solomon

Joan Baez chronology
Joan Baez/5 (1964)	Farewell, Angelina (1965)	Noël (1966)

Farewell, Angelina is the fifth studio album by American folk singer Joan Baez, released in late 1965. It peaked at No. 10 on the Billboard Pop Albums chart.

== History ==
The album represented a further shift from the strictly traditional folk music with which Baez had begun her career in that, for the first time, she included electric backup in the form of Bruce Langhorne's electric guitar. Additional musicians included Russ Savakus (bass) and Ralph Rinzler (mandolin).

The album takes its name from a Bob Dylan song—which is also covered by Baez as the leading track—and includes a total of four Dylan songs, two of which were not officially released by him until 1991. The album also features songs written by other folk singers such as Woody Guthrie and Pete Seeger, as well as a German reading of "Where Have All the Flowers Gone?".

The cover photo was taken by Richard Avedon. In the UK the title song was issued as a single on Fontana Records.

The 2002 reissue of the album by Vanguard features three previously unreleased additional tracks from the Farewell, Angelina sessions: "One Too Many Mornings"; "Rock, Salt, and Nails"; and "The Water Is Wide".

== Critical reception ==
Professional ratings
Review scores
Source	Rating
Record Mirror	4/5 stars

In a retrospective summary for AllMusic, Bruce Eder commented on how Baez was expanding along with the folk-rock of the 60s. He felt that in addition to Baez, the album contained good work by Langhorne and Richard Romoff on string bass.

== Track listing ==
1. "Farewell, Angelina" (Bob Dylan) – 3:13
2. "Daddy, You Been on My Mind" (Bob Dylan) – 2:15
3. "It's All Over Now, Baby Blue" (Bob Dylan) – 3:21
4. "The Wild Mountain Thyme" (Traditional, arranged Francis McPeake Family) – 4:34
5. "Ranger's Command" (Woody Guthrie) – 3:13
6. "Colours" (Donovan) – 3:02
7. "A Satisfied Mind" (Joe "Red" Hayes, Jack Rhodes) – 3:22
8. "The River in the Pines" (Traditional) – 3:33
9. "Pauvre Ruteboeuf" ("Poor Ruteboeuf") (Léo Ferré, Rutebeuf) – 3:28
10. "Sagt Mir wo die Blumen sind" ("Where Have All the Flowers Gone?") (Pete Seeger) – 4:00
11. "A Hard Rain's A-Gonna Fall" (Bob Dylan) – 7:36

Reissue bonus tracks

1. "One Too Many Mornings" (Bob Dylan) – 2:45
2. "Rock, Salt and Nails" (Bruce Duncan "Utah" Phillips) – 3:43
3. "The Water Is Wide" (Traditional) (Child No. 204) – 3:09

== Personnel ==
- Joan Baez – vocals, guitar
- Bruce Langhorne – electric guitar (2, 3, 6, 7, 11)
- Ralph Rinzler – mandolin (7)
- Richard Romoff – string bass (4, 10)
- Russ Savakus – bass

== Chart positions ==
Chart (1965)	Peak position
German Albums (Offizielle Top 100)	30
UK Albums (Official Charts)	5
US Billboard 200	10
