= Noël (Joan Baez album) =

Studio album by Joan Baez
- Released: 1966
- Recorded: 1966
- Genre: Folk, Christmas
- Length: 39:19
- Label: Vanguard VSD-79230: Fontana (UK): TFL 6073
- Producer: Maynard Solomon

Joan Baez chronology
Farewell Angelina (1965)	Noël (1966)	Joan (1967)

Professional ratings
Review scores
Source	Rating
AllMusic	3.5/5 stars

Noël is the sixth studio and first Christmas album by Joan Baez, released in November 1966.

Working with arranger-conductor Peter Schickele (PDQ Bach), Baez, for the first time, recorded an album outside the standard guitar-based folk format. She worked with Schickele on her next two albums, both of which also featured classical orchestration.

Unlike holiday albums by many other popular artists, Baez included mostly traditional material, avoiding more lighthearted or commercial fare in favor of a somber, understated tone. She included both familiar ("The Little Drummer Boy") and more obscure ("Down in Yon Forest") material. The album also contains several brief instrumental selections arranged by Schickele.

== Track listing ==
=== Side 1 ===
1. "O Come, O Come, Emmanuel" (Traditional) – 2:58
2. "Coventry Carol" (Traditional) – 1:58
3. "Good King Wenceslas" (Traditional) – instrumental – 0:27
4. "The Little Drummer Boy" (Katherine Kennicott Davis, Henry Onorati, Harry Simeone) – 3:03
5. "I Wonder as I Wander" (John Jacob Niles) – 3:57
6. "Bring a Torch, Jeanette, Isabella" – instrumental – 0:38
7. "Down in Yon Forest" (Traditional) – 1:40
8. "The Carol of the Birds" (Traditional) – 3:33
9. "Angels We Have Heard On High" (Traditional) – instrumental – 1:22

=== Side 2 ===
1. "Ave Maria" (Franz Schubert) (sung in German) – 4:08
2. "Mary's Wandering" (Traditional) – 3:18
3. "Deck the Halls" (Traditional) – instrumental – 0:19
4. "Away in a Manger" (James Ramsey Murray) – 1:56
5. "Adeste Fideles (O Come, all ye Faithful)" (Traditional) – instrumental – 0:47
6. "Cantique de Noël (O Holy Night)" (Adolphe Adam) – 3:49
7. "What Child Is This" (Traditional) – 3:01
8. "Silent Night" (Franz Xaver Gruber) – 2:25
- Baez dedicated "The Carol of the Birds" to Pablo Casals.

=== CD bonus tracks ===
18. "The First Noel" (Traditional) – 2:29
19. "We Three Kings" (Traditional) – instrumental – 1:47
20. "Virgin Mary" (Traditional) – 2:59
21. "Good Christian Kings" (Traditional) – instrumental – 0:55
22. "Burgundian Carol" (Traditional) – 4:35
23. "Away in a Manger" (James Ramsey Murray) – alternate version sung in French – 1:57

== Personnel ==
- Joan Baez – vocals, guitar
- Peter Schickele – arranger, conductor
