= Joan (album) =

Studio album by Joan Baez
- Released: August 1967
- Recorded: April – June 1967
- Studio: Vanguard, New York City
- Genre: Folk
- Length: 44:49
- Label: Vanguard VSD-79240
- Producer: Maynard Solomon

Joan Baez chronology
| Noël (1966) | Joan (1967) | Portrait of Joan Baez (1967) |

Professional ratings
Review scores
| Source | Rating |
|---|---|
| AllMusic | link |

Joan is the seventh studio album by Joan Baez, released in 1967. Having exhausted the standard voice/guitar folksong format by 1967, Baez collaborated with arranger-conductor Peter Schickele (with whom she'd worked on the 1966 Christmas album, Noël), on an album of orchestrated covers of mostly then-current pop and rock and roll songs. Works by Donovan, Paul Simon, Tim Hardin, the Beatles, and Richard Fariña were included, as well as selections by Jacques Brel and Edgar Allan Poe.

The recording of "Children of Darkness" was a tribute to Baez's brother-in-law, novelist and musician Richard Fariña, who had been killed in a motorcycle accident a year earlier.

"La Colombe" is a French anti-war anthem about French soldiers being sent to fight Algeria in the latter country's bid for independence.

The 2003 Vanguard reissue contains two bonus tracks: "Oh, Had I a Golden Thread" and "Autumn Leaves", the latter sung in French.

== Cover ==
According to the liner notes on the 2003 reissue, in the cover photo of Baez, she was actually lying down. A candid photo taken during recording sessions while she was resting between songs was spun around so it looked as though she was sitting or standing upright. The photo was by French photographer Alain Gaveau, with whom she was romantically attached at the time. He also contributed the photo for her previous album, Noel and her book Daybreak.

== Track listing ==
=== Side one ===
1. "Be Not Too Hard" (Donovan, lyrics: Christopher Logue)
2. "Eleanor Rigby" (John Lennon, Paul McCartney)
3. "Turquoise" (Donovan)
4. "La Colombe (The Dove)" (Jacques Brel)
5. "Dangling Conversation" (Paul Simon)
6. "The Lady Came from Baltimore" (Tim Hardin)
7. "North" (Joan Baez; Nina Dusheck, lyrics)

=== Side two ===
1. "Children of Darkness" (Richard Fariña)
2. "The Greenwood Side" (Traditional)
3. "If You Were a Carpenter" (Hardin)
4. "Annabel Lee" (Don Dilworth; lyrics: Edgar Allan Poe)
5. "Saigon Bride" (Joan Baez; Nina Dusheck, lyrics )

== Personnel ==
- Joan Baez – vocals, guitar
- Richard Romoff - bass (side one)
- Russ Savakus - bass (side two)
- Al Rogers - drums
- Bruce Langhorne - electric guitar
- Peter Schickele – arranger, conductor

== Charts ==
| Chart (1967) | Peak position |
|---|---|
| US Billboard 200 | 38 |
| Norwegian Albums (VG-lista) | 16 |
