= Joan Baez =

American contemporary folk musician (born 1941)

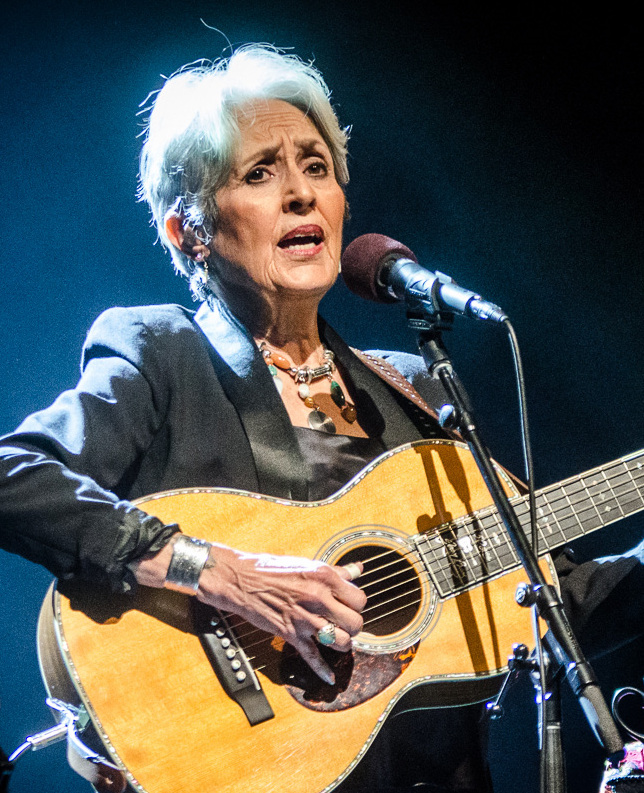
- Baez in 2016

Background information
- Born: Joan Chandos Baez; January 9, 1941 (age 85); Staten Island, New York, U.S.
- Genres: Folk; folk rock; Americana; country folk; gospel; Latin
- Occupations: Singer-songwriter; musician; activist
- Instruments: Vocals; guitar
- Years active: 1958–present
- Labels: Vanguard; RCA Victor; A&M; Portrait/CBS; Gold Castle; Virgin; Guardian; Koch; Razor & Tie
- Spouse: David Harris (m. 1968; div. 1973)
- Website: joanbaez.com

Joan Chandos Baez (/baɪz/, (Note: Baez pronounces her surname /baɪz/, though it is commonly pronounced /ˈbaɪɛz/.) Spanish: [ˈbaes]; born January 9, 1941) is an American singer-songwriter, musician, and activist. Her contemporary folk music often includes songs of protest and social justice. Baez has performed publicly for over 60 years, releasing more than 30 albums.

Baez is generally regarded as a folk singer, but her music has diversified since the counterculture era of the 1960s and encompasses genres such as folk rock, pop, country, and gospel music. She began her recording career in 1960 and achieved immediate success. Her first three albums, Joan Baez, Joan Baez, Vol. 2 and Joan Baez in Concert, all achieved gold record status. Although a songwriter herself, Baez generally interprets others' work, having recorded many traditional songs and songs written by the Allman Brothers Band, the Beatles, Jackson Browne, Leonard Cohen, Woody Guthrie, Violeta Parra, the Rolling Stones, Pete Seeger, Paul Simon, Stevie Wonder, Bob Marley, and many others. She was one of the first major artists to record songs by Bob Dylan in the early 1960s; at that time Baez was already an internationally celebrated artist, and did much to popularize his early songwriting efforts. Her tumultuous relationship with Dylan later became the subject of songs by each of them and generated much public speculation. On her later albums she has found success interpreting the work of more recent songwriters, including Ryan Adams, Josh Ritter, Steve Earle, Natalie Merchant, and Joe Henry.

Baez's songs include "Diamonds & Rust" and covers of Phil Ochs's "There but for Fortune" and the Band's "The Night They Drove Old Dixie Down". She also recorded "Farewell, Angelina", "Love Is Just a Four-Letter Word", "Forever Young", "Here's to You", "Joe Hill", "Sweet Sir Galahad" and "We Shall Overcome". Baez performed fourteen songs at the 1969 Woodstock Festival and has displayed a lifelong commitment to political and social activism in the fields of nonviolence, civil rights, human rights, and the environment. Baez was inducted into the Rock and Roll Hall of Fame on April 7, 2017.

== Early and personal life ==
Baez was born in the Staten Island borough of New York City on January 9, 1941. Her paternal grandfather Alberto Baez left the Catholic Church to become a Methodist minister and moved to the U.S. when her father was two years old. Her father Albert Baez (1912–2007) was born in Puebla, Mexico, and grew up in Brooklyn, New York, where his father preached to and advocated for a Spanish-speaking congregation. Albert first considered becoming a minister but instead turned to the study of mathematics and physics and received his PhD from Stanford University in 1950. Albert was later credited as a co-inventor of the X-ray microscope. Joan's cousin John C. Baez is a mathematical physicist. Her mother Joan Chandos Baez (née Bridge), referred to as "Joan Senior" or "Big Joan", was born in Edinburgh, Scotland, the second daughter of an English Anglican priest who claimed to be descended from the Dukes of Chandos. Born on April 11, 1913, she died on April 20, 2013 aged 100.

Baez was the second of three sisters, all of whom were political activists and musicians. The eldest was Pauline Thalia Baez Bryan (1938–2016), also known as Pauline Marden, and the youngest was Margarita Mimi Baez Fariña (1945–2001), who was better known as Mimi Fariña. The Baez family converted to Quakerism during Joan's early childhood, and she has continued to identify with the tradition, particularly in her commitment to pacifism and social issues. While growing up, Baez was subjected to racial slurs and discrimination because of her Mexican heritage. Consequently, she became involved in social causes early in her career. She declined to play in any white student venues that were segregated, which meant that when she toured the Southern states, she would play only at black colleges.

Owing to her father's work with UNESCO, their family moved many times, living in towns across the U.S. as well as in England, France, Switzerland, Spain, Canada, and the Middle East, including Iraq. Baez became involved with a variety of social causes early in her career, including civil rights and nonviolence. Social justice, she stated in the PBS series American Masters, is the "true core" of her life, "looming larger than music". Baez spent much of her formative youth living in the San Francisco Bay area, where she graduated from Palo Alto High School in 1958. Here, Baez dated Michael New, a fellow student described as "Trinidad English" whom she met at her college in the late 1950s, and occasionally introduced as her husband. Baez committed her first act of civil disobedience by refusing to leave her Palo Alto High School classroom in Palo Alto, California for an air raid drill.

Baez remained close to her younger sister Mimi up until Mimi's death in 2001 and mentioned in the 2009 American Masters documentary that she had grown closer to her older sister Pauline in later years. Currently, Baez is a resident of Woodside, California, where she lived with her mother until the latter's death in 2013. She has said that her house has a backyard tree house in which she spends time meditating, writing, and "being close to nature". Since stepping down from the stage in 2019, she has devoted herself to portraiture. Responding to false assumptions that have been promoted about her, Baez stated in 2019 that she was not a vegetarian and had not been part of the second-wave feminist movement, remarking that her stardom shielded her from the everyday struggles of other women. She is the subject of the 2023 documentary Joan Baez: I Am a Noise in which she reflected on among other things her personal struggles, her political activism, and her personal and professional relationship with Bob Dylan. She also related that both she and her sister Mimi had struggled with depression and after years of therapy came to believe that they had been abused by their father. In her 2024 poetry collection When You See My Mother Ask Her to Dance, Baez said that she has been diagnosed with dissociative identity disorder.

== Music career ==
The opening line of Baez's memoir And a Voice to Sing With is "I was born gifted", referring to her singing voice, which she explained was given to her and for which she can take no credit. A friend of Joan's father gave her a ukulele. She learned four chords, which enabled her to play rhythm and blues, the music she was listening to at the time. Her parents, however, were fearful that the music would lead her into a life of drug addiction. When Baez was 13, her aunt took her to a concert by folk musician Pete Seeger, and Baez found herself strongly moved by his music. She soon began practicing the songs of his repertoire and performing them publicly. One of her earliest public performances was at a retreat in Saratoga, California, for a youth group from Temple Beth Jacob, a Redwood City, California, Jewish congregation. A few years later, in 1957, Baez bought her first Gibson acoustic guitar.

=== College music scene in Massachusetts ===
After graduating from high school in 1958, Baez and her family moved from the San Francisco area to Boston, Massachusetts, after her father accepted a faculty position at MIT. At that time, it was in the center of the up-and-coming folk-music scene and she began performing near home in Boston and nearby Cambridge. She also performed in clubs and attended Boston University for about six weeks before she gave her first concert at the Club 47 in Cambridge. When designing the poster for the performance, Baez considered changing her performing name to either Rachel Sandperl, the surname of her longtime mentor Ira Sandperl, or Maria from the song "They Call the Wind Maria". She later opted against doing so, fearing that people would accuse her of changing her last name because it was Spanish. The audience consisted of her parents, sister Mimi, her boyfriend, and a few friends—a total of eight patrons. Baez was paid ten dollars before she was later asked back and began performing twice a week for $25 per show.

A few months later, Baez and two other folk enthusiasts made plans to record an album in the cellar of a friend's house. The trio sang solos and duets and a family friend designed the album cover, which was released on Veritas Records that same year as Folksingers 'Round Harvard Square. Baez later met Bob Gibson and Odetta, who were at the time two of the most prominent vocalists singing folk and gospel music. Baez cites Odetta as a primary influence along with Marian Anderson and Pete Seeger. Gibson invited Baez to perform with him at the 1959 Newport Folk Festival, where they sang two duets, "Virgin Mary Had One Son" and "We Are Crossing Jordan River". The performance generated substantial praise for the "barefoot Madonna" with the otherworldly voice, and it was this appearance that led to Baez signing with Vanguard Records the following year, although Columbia Records tried to sign her first. Baez later claimed that she felt she would be given more artistic license at a more "low key" label. Baez's nickname at the time, "Madonna", has been attributed to her clear voice, long hair, and natural beauty, and to her role as "Earth Mother".

=== First albums and 1960s breakthrough ===
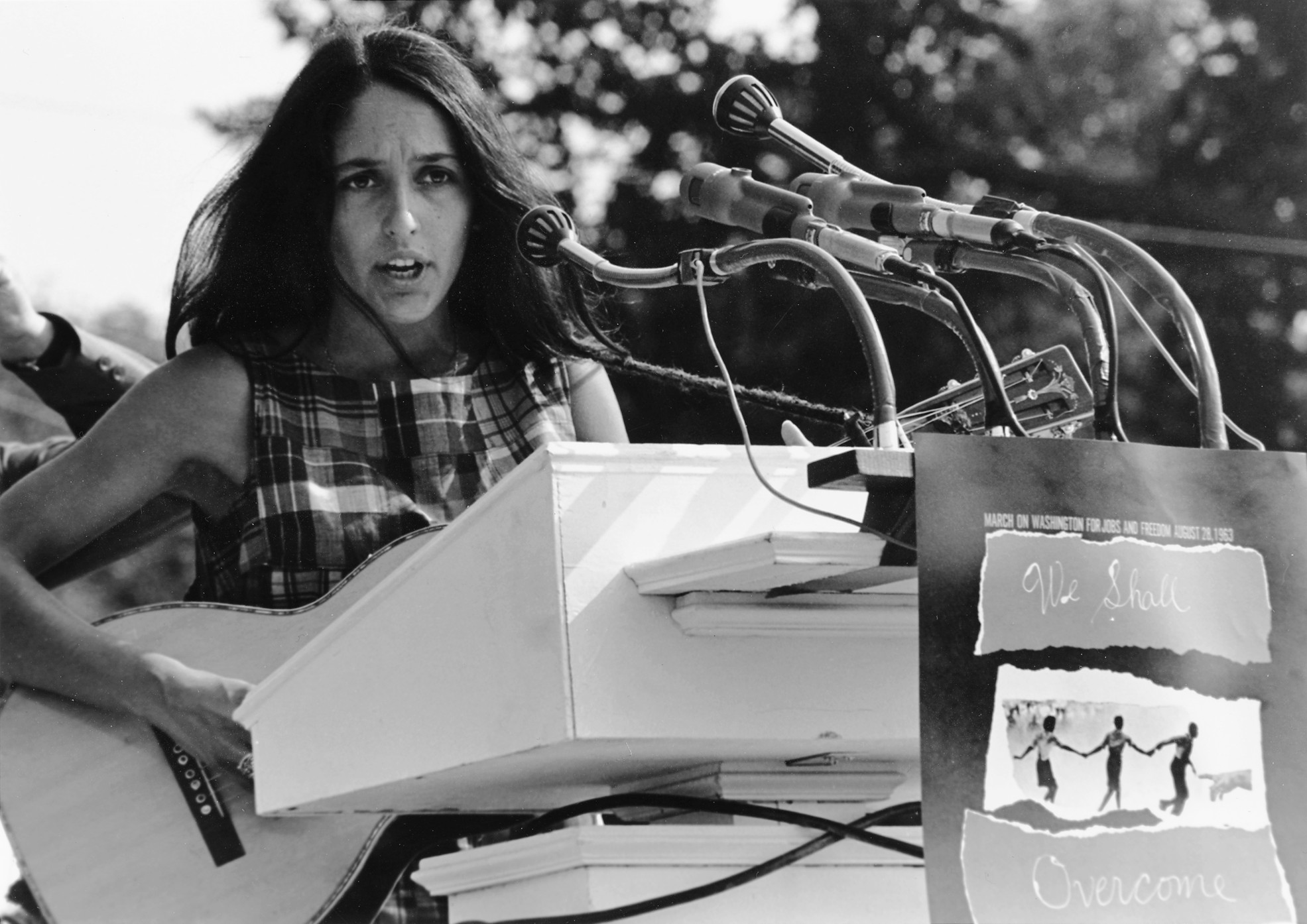
Baez playing at the March on Washington in August 1963

Her true professional career began at the inaugural Newport Folk Festival in 1959. After that appearance, she recorded her first album for Vanguard, Joan Baez (1960). It was recorded in just four days in the ballroom of New York City's Manhattan Towers Hotel and was produced by Fred Hellerman of The Weavers, who produced many albums by folk artists. Its songs included traditional folk ballads, blues, and laments, including Child Ballads, sung to her own guitar accompaniment. The album also included "El Preso Numero Nueve", a song sung entirely in Spanish, which she would re-record in 1974 for inclusion on her Spanish-language album Gracias a la Vida. The album sold moderately well.

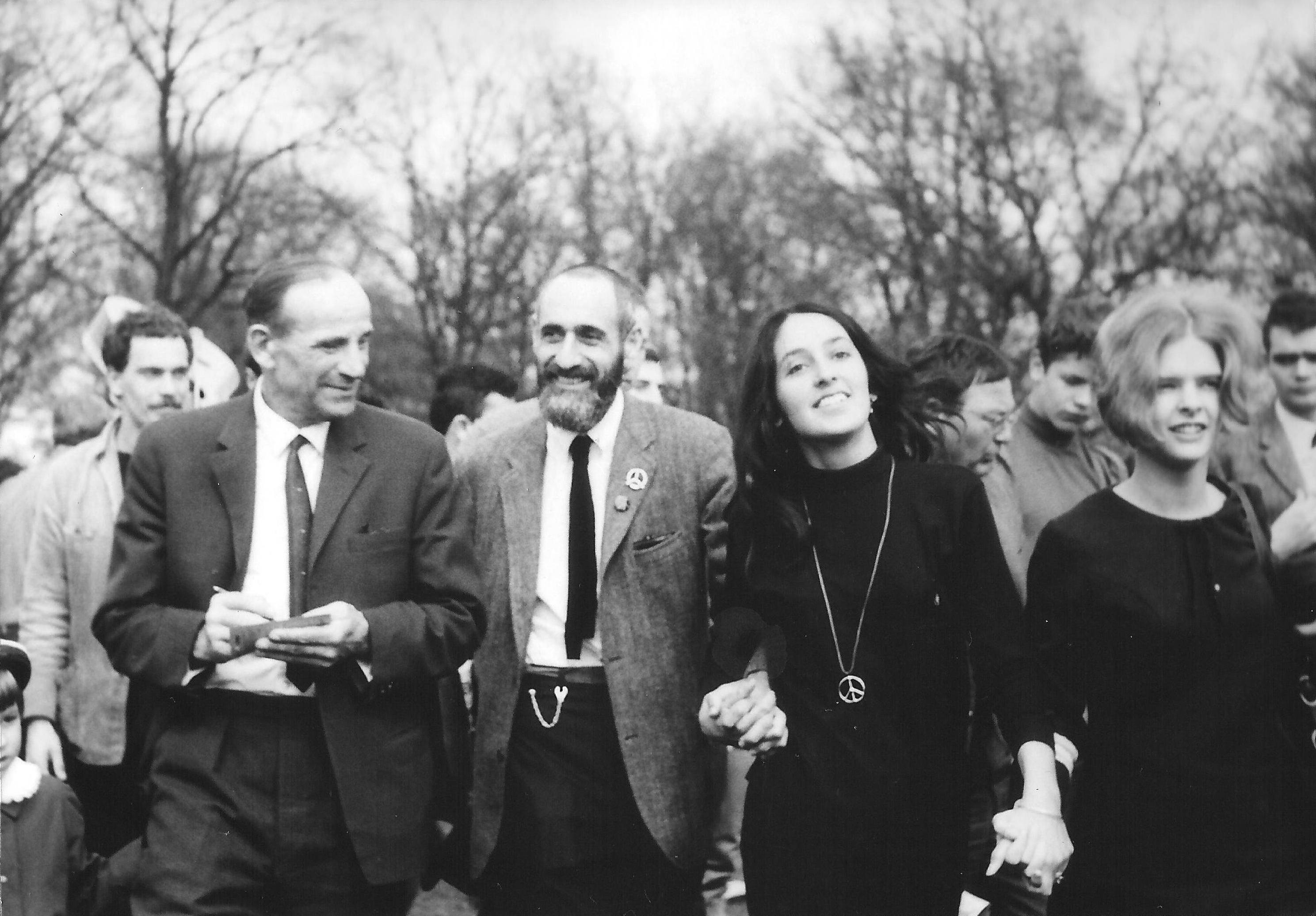
Ira Sandperl and Baez (center) at the Frankfurt Easter March 1966

She made her New York concert debut on November 5, 1960, at the 92nd Street Y and on November 11, 1961, Baez played her first major New York concert at a sold-out performance at Town Hall. Robert Shelton, folk critic of the New York Times, praised the concert, saying, "That superb soprano voice, as lustrous and rich as old gold, flowed purely all evening with a wondrous ease. Her singing (unwound) like a spool of satin." Years later when Baez thought back to that concert, she laughed, saying: "I remember in 1961 my manager sending me this newspaper (clipping) in the mail (which) read, 'Joan Baez Town Hall Concert, SRO.' I thought SRO meant 'sold right out.' I was so innocent of it all."

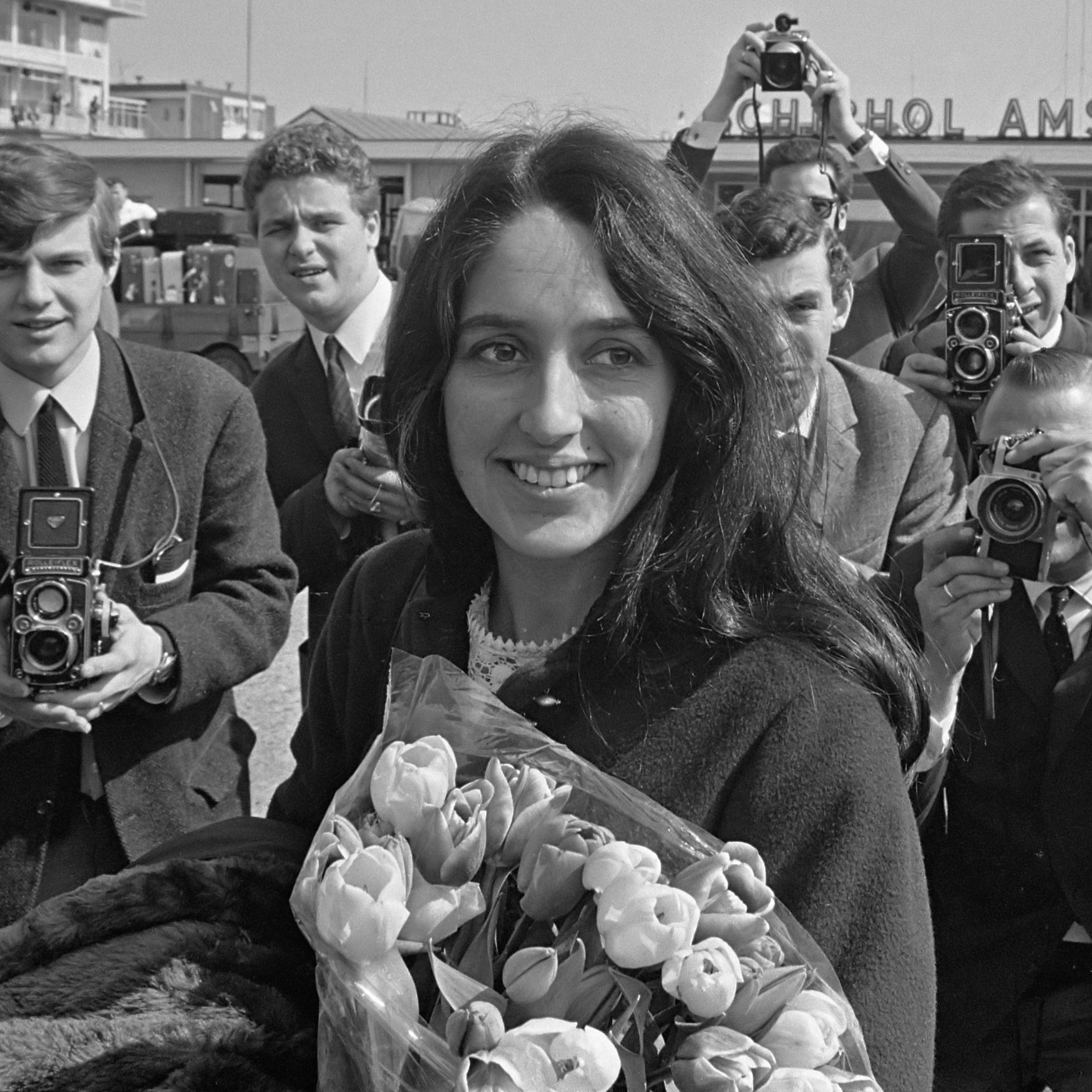
Baez at Amsterdam Airport, 1966

Her second release, Joan Baez, Vol. 2 (1961), went gold, as did Joan Baez in Concert, Part 1 (1962) and Joan Baez in Concert, Part 2 (1963). Like its immediate predecessor, Joan Baez, Vol. 2 contained strictly traditional material. Her two albums of live material, Joan Baez in Concert, Part 1 and its second counterpart were unique in that unlike most live albums, they contained only new songs rather than established favorites. It was Joan Baez in Concert, Part 2 that featured Baez's first-ever Dylan cover. From the early to the mid-1960s, Baez emerged at the forefront of the American roots revival, where she introduced her audiences to the then-unknown Bob Dylan and was emulated by artists such as Judy Collins, Emmylou Harris, Joni Mitchell, and Bonnie Raitt. On November 23, 1962, Baez appeared on the cover of Time Magazine—a rare honor then for a musician. Although primarily an album artist, several of Baez's singles have charted, the first being her 1965 cover of Phil Ochs' "There but for Fortune", which became a mid-level chart hit in the U.S. and Canada, and a top-ten single in the United Kingdom.

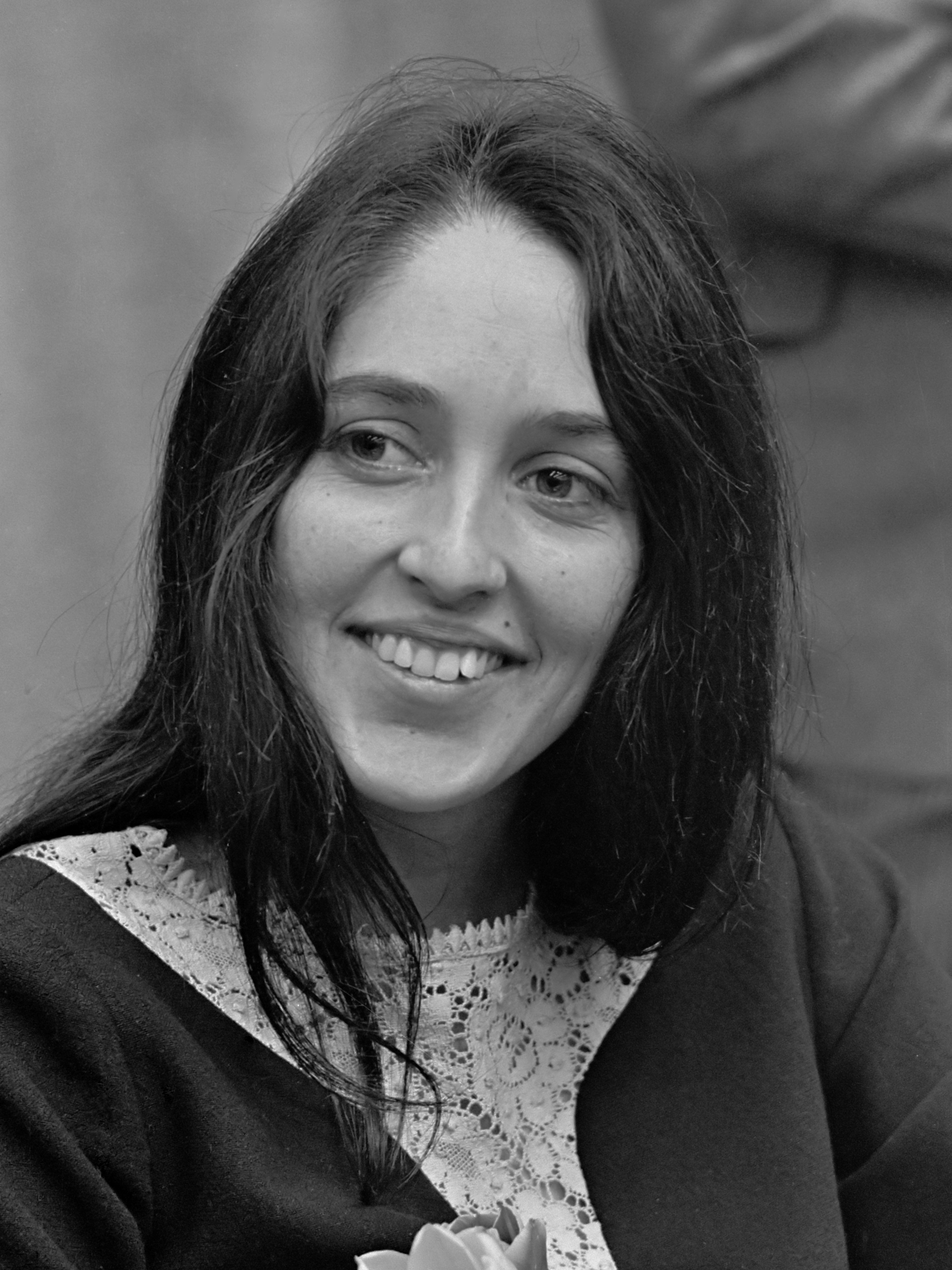
Baez in 1966

Baez added other instruments to her recordings on Farewell, Angelina (1965), which features several Dylan songs interspersed with more traditional fare. Deciding to experiment with different styles, Baez turned to Peter Schickele, a classical music composer, who provided classical orchestration for her next three albums: Noël (1966), Joan (1967), and Baptism: A Journey Through Our Time (1968). Noël was a Christmas album of traditional material, while Baptism was akin to a concept album, featuring Baez reading and singing poems written by celebrated poets such as James Joyce, Federico García Lorca, and Walt Whitman. Joan featured interpretations of work by contemporary composers, including John Lennon and Paul McCartney, Tim Hardin, Paul Simon, and Donovan.

In 1968, Baez traveled to Nashville, Tennessee, where a marathon recording session resulted in two albums. The first, Any Day Now (1968), consists exclusively of Dylan covers. The other, the country-music-infused David's Album (1969), was recorded for husband David Harris, a prominent anti-Vietnam War protester eventually imprisoned for draft resistance. Harris, a country music fan, turned Baez toward more complex country-rock influences beginning with David's Album. Later in 1968, Baez published her first memoir, Daybreak (by Dial Press). In August 1969, her appearance at Woodstock in upstate New York raised her international musical and political profile, particularly after the successful release of the documentary film Woodstock (1970).

Beginning in the late 1960s, Baez began writing many of her own songs, beginning with "Sweet Sir Galahad" and "A Song For David", both songs appearing on her 1970 (I Live) One Day at a Time album; "Sweet Sir Galahad" was written about her sister Mimi's second marriage, while "A Song For David" was a tribute to Harris. One Day at a Time, like David's Album, featured a decidedly country sound. Baez's distinctive vocal style and political activism had a significant impact on American popular music. She was one of the first musicians to use her popularity as a vehicle for social protest, singing and marching for human rights and peace. Pete Seeger, Odetta, and decades-long friend Harry Belafonte were her early social justice advocate influences. Baez came to be considered the "most accomplished interpretive folksinger/songwriter of the 1960s". Her appeal extended far beyond the folk music audience. Of her fourteen Vanguard albums, thirteen made the top 100 of Billboard's mainstream pop chart, eleven made the top forty, eight made the top twenty, and four made the top ten.

=== 1970s and the end of Vanguard years ===
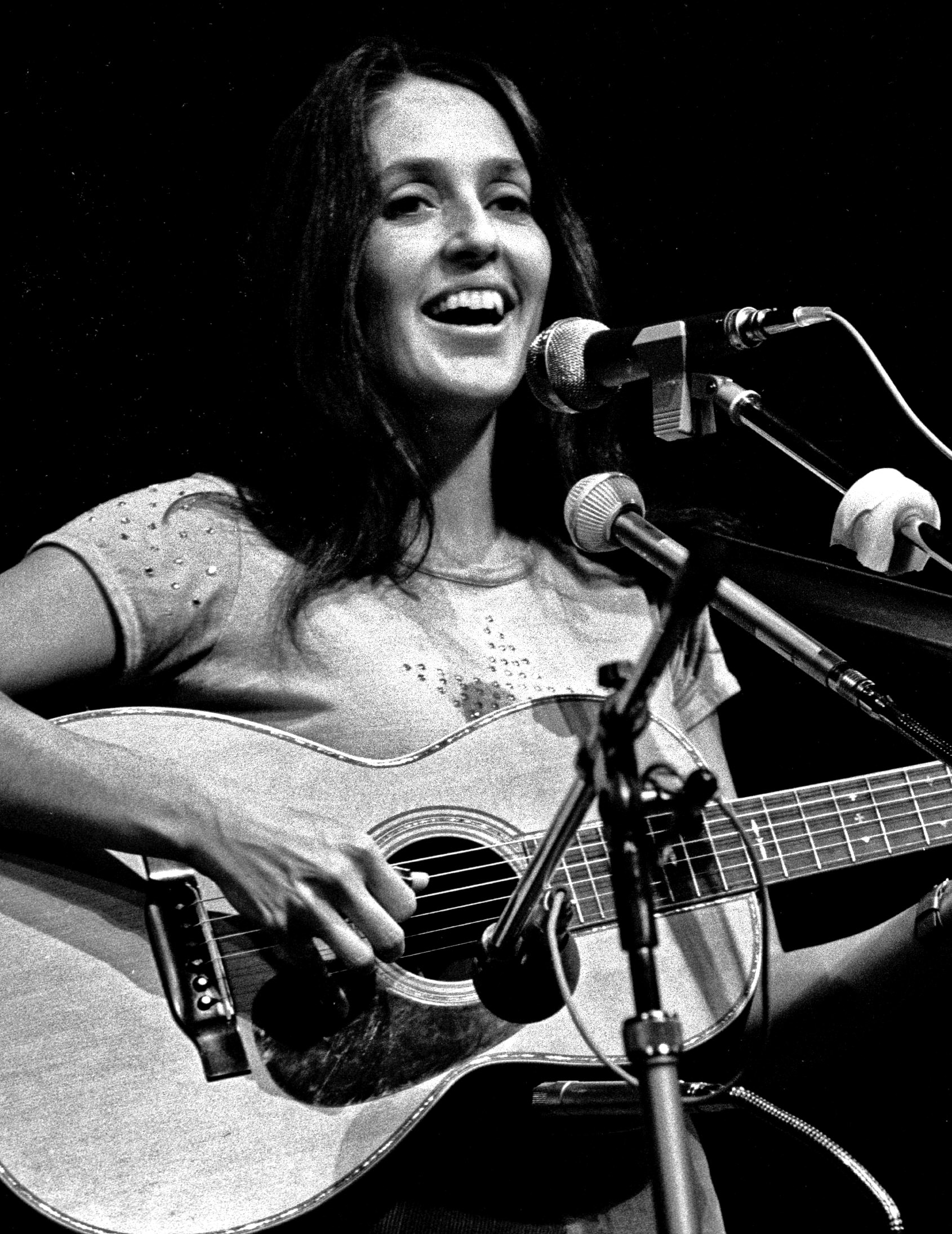
Baez playing in Hamburg, 1973

After eleven years with Vanguard, Baez decided in 1971 to cut ties with the label that had released her albums since 1960. She delivered Vanguard one last success with the gold-selling album Blessed Are... (1971), which included a top-ten hit in "The Night They Drove Old Dixie Down", her cover of the Band's signature song. With Come from the Shadows (1972), Baez switched to A&M Records, where she remained for four years and six albums. Joan Baez wrote "The Story of Bangladesh" in 1971. This song was based on the Pakistani army crackdown on unarmed sleeping Bengali students at Dhaka University on March 25, 1971, which ignited the prolonged nine-month Bangladesh Liberation War. The song was later titled "The Song of Bangladesh" and released in a 1972 album from Chandos Music.

During this period in late 1971, she reunited with composer Peter Schickele to record two tracks, "Rejoice in the Sun" and "Silent Running" for the science-fiction film Silent Running. The two songs were issued as a single on Decca (32890). In addition to this, another LP was released on Decca (DL 7-9188) and was later reissued by Varèse Sarabande on black (STV-81072) and green (VC-81072) vinyl. In 1998, a limited release on CD by the "Valley Forge Record Groupe" was released.

Baez's first album for A&M, Come from the Shadows, was recorded in Nashville, and included a number of more personal compositions, including "Love Song to a Stranger" and "Myths", as well as work by Mimi Farina, John Lennon, and Anna Marly. Where Are You Now, My Son? (1973) featured a 23-minute title song which took up all of the B-side of the album. Half spoken word poem and half tape-recorded sounds, the song documented Baez's visit to Hanoi, North Vietnam, in December 1972 during which she and her traveling companions survived the 11-day-long Christmas Bombings campaign over Hanoi and Haiphong.

Gracias a la Vida (1974) (the title song written and first performed by Chilean folk singer Violeta Parra) followed and was a success in both the U.S. and Latin America. It included the song "Cucurrucucú paloma". Flirting with mainstream pop music as well as writing her own songs for Diamonds & Rust (1975), the album became the highest selling of Baez's career and included a second top-ten single in the form of the title track. After Gulf Winds (1976), an album of entirely self-composed songs and From Every Stage (1976), a live album that had Baez performing songs "from every stage" of her career, Baez again parted ways with a record label when she moved to CBS Records for Blowin' Away (1977) and Honest Lullaby (1979).

=== 1980s and 1990s ===
In 1980, Baez was given honorary Doctor of Humane Letters degrees by Antioch University and Rutgers University for her political activism and the "universality of her music". In 1983, she appeared on the Grammy Awards, performing Dylan's anthemic "Blowin' in the Wind", a song she first performed twenty years earlier. Baez also played a significant role in the 1985 Live Aid concert for African famine relief, opening the U.S. segment of the show in Philadelphia, Pennsylvania. She has toured on behalf of many other causes, including Amnesty International's 1986 A Conspiracy of Hope tour and a guest spot on their subsequent Human Rights Now! tour.

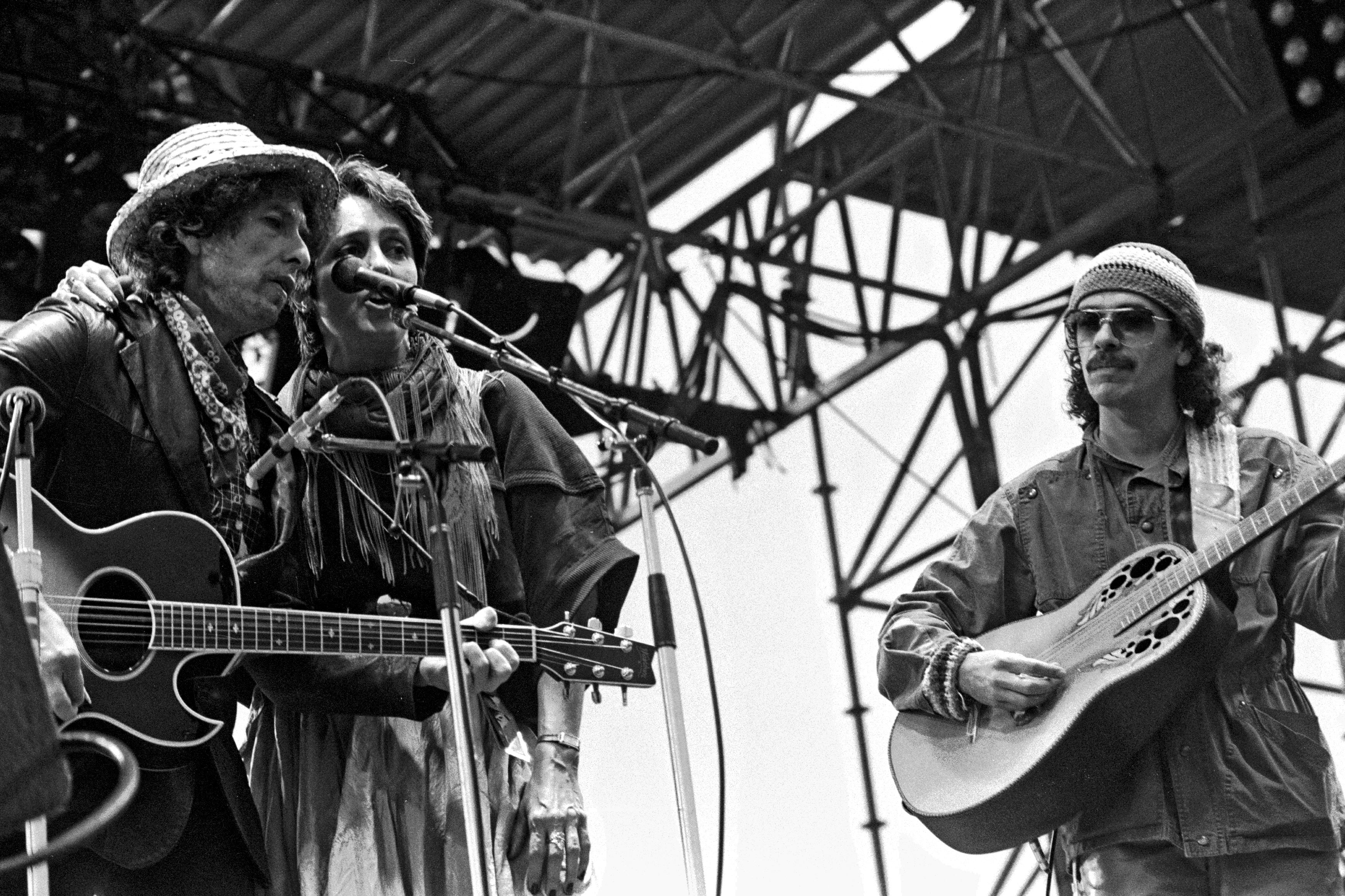
Bob Dylan, Baez, and Carlos Santana, performing in 1984

Baez found herself without an American label for the release of Live Europe 83 (1984), which was released in Europe and Canada but not released commercially in the U.S. She did not have an American release until the album Recently (1987) on Gold Castle Records. In 1987, Baez's second autobiography, called And a Voice to Sing With, was published and became a New York Times bestseller. That same year, she traveled to the Middle East to visit with and sing songs of peace for Israel and the Palestinians.

In May 1989, Baez performed at a music festival in Communist Czechoslovakia called Bratislavská lýra. While there, she met future Czechoslovak president Václav Havel, whom she let carry her guitar so as to prevent his arrest by government agents. During her performance, she greeted members of Charter 77, a dissident human-rights group, which resulted in her microphone being shut off abruptly. Baez then proceeded to sing a cappella for the nearly four thousand gathered. Havel cited her as a great inspiration and influence in that country's Velvet Revolution, the revolution in which the Soviet-dominated Communist government there was overthrown.

Baez recorded two more albums with Gold Castle: Speaking of Dreams, (1989) and Brothers in Arms (1991). She then landed a contract with a major label, Virgin Records, recording Play Me Backwards (1992) for Virgin shortly before the company was purchased by EMI. She then switched to Guardian, with whom she produced a live album, Ring Them Bells (1995), and a studio album, Gone from Danger (1997).

In 1993, at the invitation of Refugees International and sponsored by the Soros Foundation, she traveled to the war-torn Bosnia and Herzegovina region of former-Yugoslavia in an effort to help bring more attention to the suffering there. She was the first major artist to perform in Sarajevo since the outbreak of the Yugoslav civil war. In October 1993, Baez became the first major artist to perform in a professional concert presentation on Alcatraz Island (a former U.S. federal prison) in San Francisco, California, in a benefit for her sister Mimi's Bread and Roses organization. She later returned for another concert in 1996.

=== 2000s ===
Beginning in 2001, Baez has had several successful long-term engagements as a lead character at San Francisco's Teatro ZinZanni. In August 2001, Vanguard began re-releasing Baez's first 13 albums, which she recorded for the label between 1960 and 1971. The reissues, being released through Vanguard's Original Master Series, feature digitally restored sound, unreleased bonus songs, new and original artwork, and new liner-note essays written by Arthur Levy. Likewise, her six A&M albums were reissued in 2003. In 2003, Baez was also a judge for the third annual Independent Music Awards to support independent artists' careers.

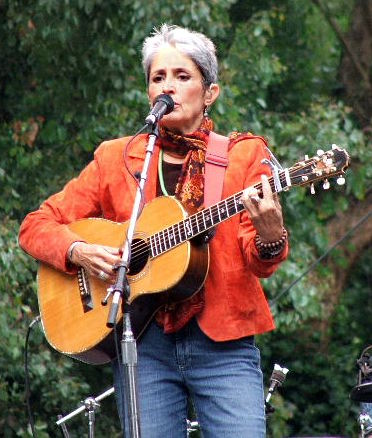
Hardly Strictly Bluegrass Festival 2005 at Golden Gate Park

Baez's album, Dark Chords on a Big Guitar (2003), features songs by composers half her age, while a November 2004 performance at New York City's Bowery Ballroom was recorded for a live release, Bowery Songs (2005). On October 1, 2005, she performed at the Hardly Strictly Bluegrass festival, at San Francisco's Golden Gate Park. Then, on January 13, 2006, Baez performed at the funeral of Lou Rawls, where she led Jesse Jackson Sr., Stevie Wonder, and others in the singing of "Amazing Grace". On June 6, 2006, Baez joined Bruce Springsteen on stage at his San Francisco concert, where the two performed the rolling anthem "Pay Me My Money Down". In September 2006, Baez contributed a live, retooled version of her classic song "Sweet Sir Galahad" to a Starbucks's exclusive XM Artist Confidential album. In the new version, she changed the lyric "here's to the dawn of their days" to "here's to the dawn of her days", as a tribute to her late sister Mimi, about whom Baez wrote the song in 1969.

On October 8, 2006, Baez appeared as a special surprise guest at the opening ceremony of the Forum 2000 international conference in Prague. Her performance was kept secret from former Czech Republic President Havel until the moment she appeared on stage. Havel was a great admirer of both Baez and her work. During Baez's next visit to Prague, in April 2007, the two met again when she performed in front of a sold-out house at Prague's Lucerna Hall, a building erected by Havel's grandfather. On December 2, 2006, she made a guest appearance at the Oakland Interfaith Gospel Choir's Christmas Concert at the Paramount Theatre in Oakland, California. Her participation included versions of "Let Us Break Bread Together" and "Amazing Grace". She also joined the choir in the finale of "O Holy Night".

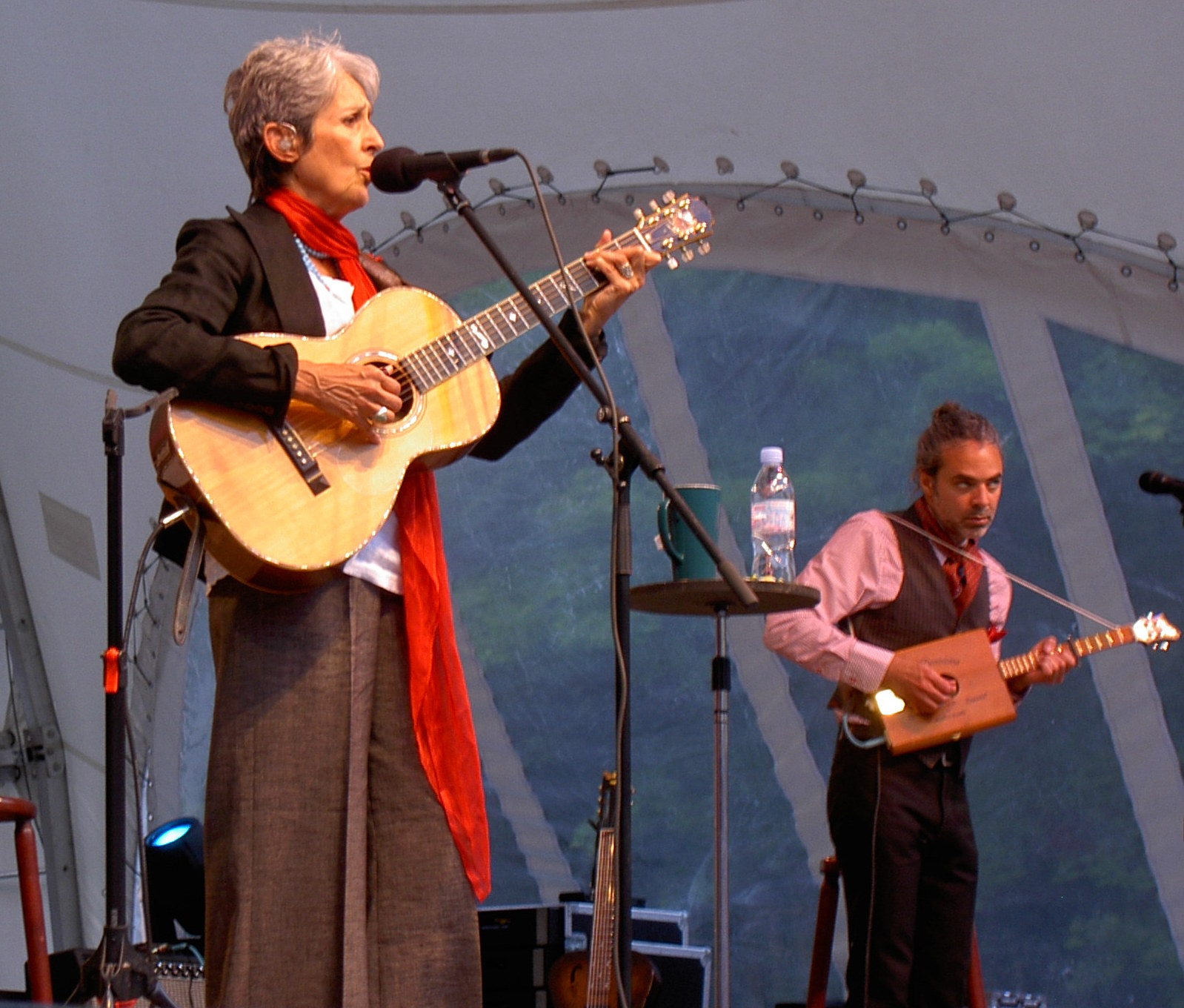
Joan Baez concert in Dresden, Germany, July 2008

In February 2007, Proper Records reissued her 1995 live album Ring Them Bells, which featured duets with artists ranging from Dar Williams and Mimi Fariña to the Indigo Girls and Mary Chapin Carpenter. The reissue features a 16-page booklet and six unreleased live tracks from the original recording sessions. In addition, Baez recorded a duet of "Jim Crow" with John Mellencamp, which appears on his album Freedom's Road (2007). Also in February 2007, she received the Grammy Lifetime Achievement Award. The day after receiving the honor, she appeared at the Grammy Awards ceremony and introduced a performance by the Dixie Chicks.

September 2008 saw the release of the studio album Day After Tomorrow, produced by Steve Earle and featuring three of his songs. The album was Baez's first charting record in nearly three decades. On June 29, 2008, Baez performed on the acoustic stage at the Glastonbury Festival playing out the final set to a packed audience. On July 6, 2008, she played at the Montreux Jazz Festival in Montreux, Switzerland. During the concert's finale, she spontaneously danced on stage with a band of African percussionists.

On August 2, 2009, Baez played at the 50th Newport Folk Festival, marking the 50th anniversary of her breakthrough performance at the first festival. On October 14, 2009, PBS aired an episode of its documentary series American Masters, titled Joan Baez: How Sweet the Sound. It was produced and directed by Mary Wharton. A DVD and CD of the soundtrack were released at the same time.

=== 2010s and 2020s ===
Baez sings "We Shall Overcome" at the White House, 2010

On April 4, 2017, Baez released on her Facebook page her first new song in 27 years, "Nasty Man", a protest song against US President Donald Trump, which became a viral hit. On April 7, 2017, she was inducted into the Rock and Roll Hall of Fame. On March 2, 2018, she released a new studio album titled Whistle Down the Wind, which charted in many countries and was nominated for a Grammy, and undertook her "Fare Thee Well Tour" to support the album. On April 30, 2019, Baez told Rolling Stone that she had been approached to perform at the Woodstock 50 festival, but had turned the offer down for "it was too complicated to even get involved in" and her "instincts" were telling her "no". She retired from touring in 2019 because, she explained, her vocal cords could no longer consistently perform at the level she demanded of herself. However, she still performs at occasional special events.

On July 28, 2019, following dates across Europe, Baez performed her final concert at Madrid's Teatro Real. In January 2021, it was announced that Baez would receive a 2020 Kennedy Center Honor in a ceremony that was postponed because of the COVID-19 pandemic. She was honored along with Debbie Allen, Garth Brooks, Midori, and Dick Van Dyke in May 2021.

On January 17, 2026, Baez performed at the public memorial service of Bob Weir at San Francisco's Civic Center Plaza.

== Social and political involvement ==
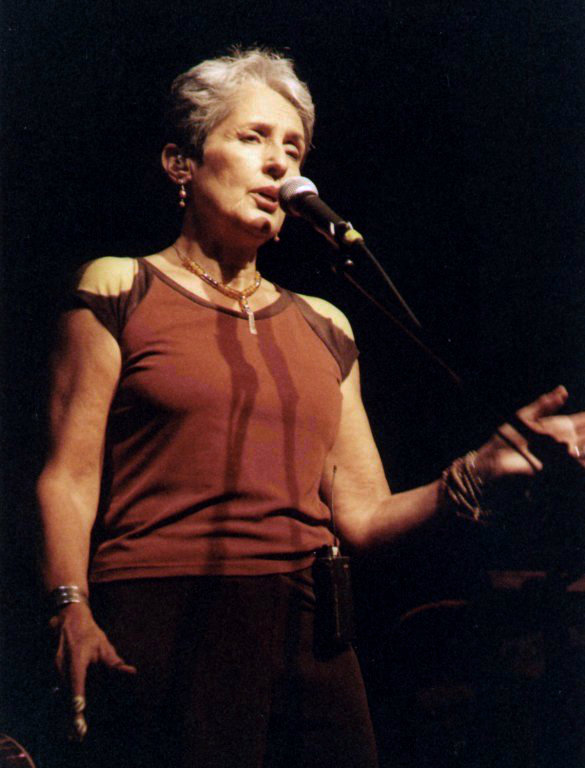
Baez in 2003

=== Civil rights ===
In 1956, Baez first heard Martin Luther King Jr. speak about nonviolence, civil rights and social change in a speech that brought tears to her eyes. Several years later, the two became friends, with Baez participating in many of the Civil Rights Movement demonstrations that King helped organize. When she was a senior in high school, Baez met anti-war activist Ira Sandperl and through their interests in various philosophies and political causes they developed a friendship. In 1965 they founded together the Institute for the Study of Non-violence in Carmel Valley, California with Sandperl running the general operations and funding coming from Baez.

The early years of Baez's career saw the Civil Rights Movement in the U.S. become a prominent issue. Her performance of "We Shall Overcome", the civil rights anthem written by Pete Seeger and Guy Carawan, at the 1963 March on Washington for Jobs and Freedom permanently linked her to the song. Baez again sang "We Shall Overcome" in Sproul Plaza during the mid-1960s Free Speech Movement demonstrations at the University of California, Berkeley in Berkeley, California, and at many other rallies and protests. Baez refused to play at any colleges or universities that participated in racial segregation as well.

Her recording of the song "Birmingham Sunday" (1964), written by her brother-in-law, Richard Fariña, was used in the opening of 4 Little Girls (1997), Spike Lee's documentary film about the four young victims killed in the 1963 16th Street Baptist Church bombing. In 1965, Baez announced that she would be opening a school to teach nonviolent protest. She also participated in the 1965 Selma to Montgomery marches for voting rights.

In November 2017, as part of a release of documents from the National Archives that were supposed to relate to the assassination of John F. Kennedy, a 1968 FBI report alleged that Baez was involved in the 1960s in an intimate affair with King, an accusation described by history professor Clayborne Carson, the director of the Martin Luther King Jr. Research and Education Institute at Stanford University, as "part of a smear campaign" against King.

I went to jail for 11 days for disturbing the peace; I was trying to disturb the war.

— Joan Baez, 1967 Pop Chronicles interview.

=== Vietnam War ===
Highly visible in civil-rights marches, Baez became more vocal about her disagreement with the Vietnam War. In 1964, she publicly endorsed resisting taxes by withholding sixty percent of her 1963 income taxes. In 1964, she founded the Institute for the Study of Nonviolence (along with her mentor Sandperl) and encouraged draft resistance at her concerts. The Institute for the Study of Nonviolence would later branch into the Resource Center for Nonviolence.

In 1966, Baez's autobiography, Daybreak, was released. It is the most detailed report of her life through 1966 and outlined her anti-war position, dedicating the book to men facing imprisonment for resisting the draft. Baez was arrested twice in 1967, having blocked the entrance of the Armed Forces Induction Center in Oakland, California, and spent over a month in jail. She was a frequent participant in anti-war marches and rallies, including:

- Numerous protests in New York City organized by the Fifth Avenue Vietnam Peace Parade Committee, starting with the March 1966 Fifth Avenue Peace Parade;
- A conversation with husband David Harris at UCLA in 1968 discussing the resistance to the draft during the Vietnam War.
- A free 1967 concert at the Washington Monument in Washington, D.C., that had been opposed by the Daughters of the American Revolution which attracted a crowd of 30,000 to hear her anti-war message;
- The 1969 Moratorium to End the War in Vietnam protests.

There were many others, culminating in Phil Ochs's The War Is Over celebration in New York City in May 1975. During the Christmas season 1972, Baez joined a peace delegation traveling to North Vietnam, both to address human rights in the region, and to deliver Christmas mail to American prisoners of war. During her time there, she was caught in the U.S. military's "Christmas bombing" of Hanoi, North Vietnam, during which the city was bombed for eleven straight days.

After the war ended, Baez was critical of the government of the Socialist Republic of Vietnam and organized the May 30, 1979, publication of a full-page advertisement (published in four major U.S. newspapers) in which the Vietnamese government was described as having created a nightmare. Her one-time anti-war ally Jane Fonda refused to join in Baez's criticism of the Vietnamese government, leading to what was publicly described as a feud between the two.

=== Prison and death penalty reform ===
In December 2005, Baez appeared and sang "Swing Low, Sweet Chariot" at the California protest at the San Quentin State Prison against the execution of Tookie Williams. She had previously performed the same song at San Quentin at the 1992 vigil protesting against the execution of Robert Alton Harris, the first man to be executed in California after the death penalty was reinstated. She subsequently lent her prestige to the campaign opposing the execution of Troy Davis by the State of Georgia. In 2016, Baez advocated for the Innocence Project and Innocence Network. At each concert, Baez informs the audience about the organizations' efforts to exonerate the wrongfully convicted and reform the system to prevent such incidents.

=== LGBT rights ===
Baez has been prominent in the struggle for gay and lesbian rights. In 1978, she performed at several benefit concerts to defeat the Briggs Initiative, which proposed banning openly gay people from teaching in public schools in California. Later that same year, she participated in memorial marches for the assassinated San Francisco city supervisor, Harvey Milk, who was openly gay. In the 1990s, she appeared with her friend Janis Ian at a benefit for the National Gay and Lesbian Task Force, a gay lobbying organization, and performed at the San Francisco Lesbian, Gay, Bisexual and Transgender Pride March. Her song "Altar Boy and the Thief" from Blowin' Away (1977) was written as a dedication to her gay fanbase.

=== China ===
Following the Tiananmen Square Massacre in June 1989, Baez wrote and published a song called "China", in which she laments a spring that "came just before the fall / There was no summer at all". The song ends with the repeated call "China shall be free".

=== Iran ===
On June 25, 2009, Baez created a special version of "We Shall Overcome", with a few lines of Persian lyrics in support of peaceful protests by Iranian people. She recorded it in her home and posted the video on her personal website and on YouTube. She dedicated the song "Joe Hill" to the people of Iran during her concert at Merrill Auditorium in Portland, Maine on July 31, 2009.

=== Environmental causes ===
On Earth Day 1999, Baez and Bonnie Raitt honored environmental activist Julia Butterfly Hill with Raitt's Arthur M. Sohcot Award in person on her 180-foot (55 m)-high redwood treetop platform, where Hill had camped to protect ancient redwoods in the Headwaters Forest from logging.

=== War in Iraq ===
In early 2003, Baez performed at two rallies of hundreds of thousands of people in San Francisco protesting the U.S. invasion of Iraq. In August 2003, she was invited by Emmylou Harris and Steve Earle to join them in London, England, at the Concert For a Landmine-Free World. In the summer of 2004, Baez joined Michael Moore's "Slacker uprising Tour" on American college campuses, encouraging young people to get out and vote for peace candidates in the upcoming presidential election. In August 2005, Baez appeared at an anti-war protest in Crawford, Texas, which had been started by Cindy Sheehan.

=== Tree sit-in for urban farmers ===
On May 23, 2006, Baez once again joined Julia Butterfly Hill, this time in a "tree sit" in a giant tree on the site of the South Central Farm in a poor neighborhood of downtown Los Angeles, California. Baez and Hill were hoisted into the tree, where they remained overnight. The women, in addition to many other activists and celebrities, were protesting the imminent eviction of the community farmers and demolition of the site, which is the largest urban farm in the state. Because many of the South Central Farmers are immigrants from Central America, Baez sang several songs from her 1974 Spanish-language album, Gracias a la Vida, including the title track and "No Nos Moverán" ("We Shall Not Be Moved").

=== 2008 presidential election ===
Throughout most of her career, Baez remained apprehensive about involving herself in party politics. However, on February 3, 2008, Baez wrote a letter to the editor at the San Francisco Chronicle endorsing Barack Obama in the 2008 U.S. presidential election. She noted: "Through all those years, I chose not to engage in party politics. ... At this time, however, changing that posture feels like the responsible thing to do. If anyone can navigate the contaminated waters of Washington, lift up the poor, and appeal to the rich to share their wealth, it is Sen. Barack Obama." Playing at the Glastonbury Festival in June, Baez said during the introduction of a song that one reason she liked Obama was because he reminded her of another old friend of hers, Martin Luther King Jr.

Although a highly political figure throughout most of her career, Baez had never publicly endorsed a major political party candidate prior to Obama. However, after Obama was elected, she expressed that she would likely never do so again, saying in a 2013 interview in The Huffington Post that "In some ways I'm disappointed, but in some ways it was silly to expect more. If he had taken his brilliance, his eloquence, his toughness and not run for office he could have led a movement. Once he got in the Oval Office he couldn't do anything." She performed at the White House on February 10, 2010, as part of an evening celebrating the music associated with the civil rights movement, performing "We Shall Overcome".

=== Occupy Wall Street ===
On November 11, 2011, Baez played as part of a musical concert for the protestors at Occupy Wall Street. Her three-song set included "Joe Hill", a cover of the Rolling Stones' "Salt of the Earth" and her own composition "Where's My Apple Pie?"

=== Catalan independence movement ===
Baez has been a strong defender of the Catalan independence movement. On July 21, 2019, she described jailed Catalan independence leaders as political prisoners. Five days later, she visited former Parliament of Catalonia president Carme Forcadell in prison.

=== Current activism and public engagement ===
In 2025, Baez was a musical guest at the Fighting Oligarchy Tour. The tour was hosted by Bernie Sanders and joined by Alexandria Ocasio-Cortez in order to discuss corporate interests and Oligarchs' influence in the United States. Baez performed in the Los Angeles stop of the tour as a musical guest alongside Neil Young on April 12, 2025 with 36,000 people in attendance.

On October 18, 2025, she made a surprise appearance and performed at the October 2025 No Kings protests during rally held in San Francisco.

In December 2025, Baez featured on a version of folk artist Jesse Welles’ song “No Kings”.

On October 3, 2026, Baez performed at the Power to the People Festival at Merriweather Post Pavilion in Columbia, MD. The festival, which is being put on by Tom Morello, will also feature performances by Morello, Bruce Springsteen, Foo Fighters and many others. The festival is being held in response towards President Donald Trump.

== Awards ==
In 2003, Baez was presented with the John Steinbeck Award for her civil rights activism. She was presented with a Lifetime Achievement Award at the 2007 Grammys. To reward her decades of dedicated activism, Baez was honored with the Spirit of Americana/Free Speech award at the 2008 Americana Music Honors & Awards. On March 18, 2011, Baez was honored by Amnesty International at its 50th Anniversary Annual General Meeting in San Francisco. The tribute to Baez was the inaugural event for the Amnesty International Joan Baez Award for Outstanding Inspirational Service in the Global Fight for Human Rights. Baez was presented with the first award in recognition of her human rights work with Amnesty International and beyond, and the inspiration she has given activists around the world. The award is to be presented to an artist – music, film, sculpture, paint or other medium – who has helped advance human rights.

In 2015, Amnesty International jointly awarded Baez and Ai Wei Wei the Ambassador of Conscience award. In 2017 Joan Baez was officially inducted into the Rock & Roll Hall Of Fame. The American Academy of Arts and Sciences elected her to fellowship in 2020, praising her contributions both to music and to activism. In May 2021, Baez was recognized as part of the 43rd Kennedy Center Honors. In 2023, Rolling Stone ranked Baez at number 189 on its list of the 200 Greatest Singers of All Time. In February 2024, she received the Third Class of the Order of the White Double Cross from Zuzana Čaputová

=== Grammy Awards ===
The Grammy Awards are awarded annually by the National Academy of Recording Arts and Sciences (NARAS). Baez has received ten nominations.

| Year | Category | Nominated work | Result | Ref. |
|---|---|---|---|---|
| 1963 | Best Ethnic or Traditional Folk Recording | Joan Baez in Concert | Nominated | |
| 1966 | Best Ethnic or Traditional Folk Recording | "There but for Fortune" | Nominated | |
| 1970 | Best Ethnic or Traditional Folk Recording | Any Day Now | Nominated | |
| 1970 | Best Album Notes | David's Album | Nominated | |
| 1972 | Best Pop Vocal Performance, Female | "The Night They Drove Old Dixie Down" | Nominated | |
| 1988 | Best Contemporary Folk Album | "Asimbonanga" | Nominated | |
| 1993 | Best Contemporary Folk Album | Play Me Backwards | Nominated | |
| 2009 | Best Contemporary Folk Album | Day After Tomorrow | Nominated | |
| 2019 | Best Contemporary Folk Album | Whiste Down the Wind | Nominated | |
| 2027 | Best American Roots Performance | "No Kings" (with Jesse Welles) | Pending | |

== Relationships ==
=== Bob Dylan ===
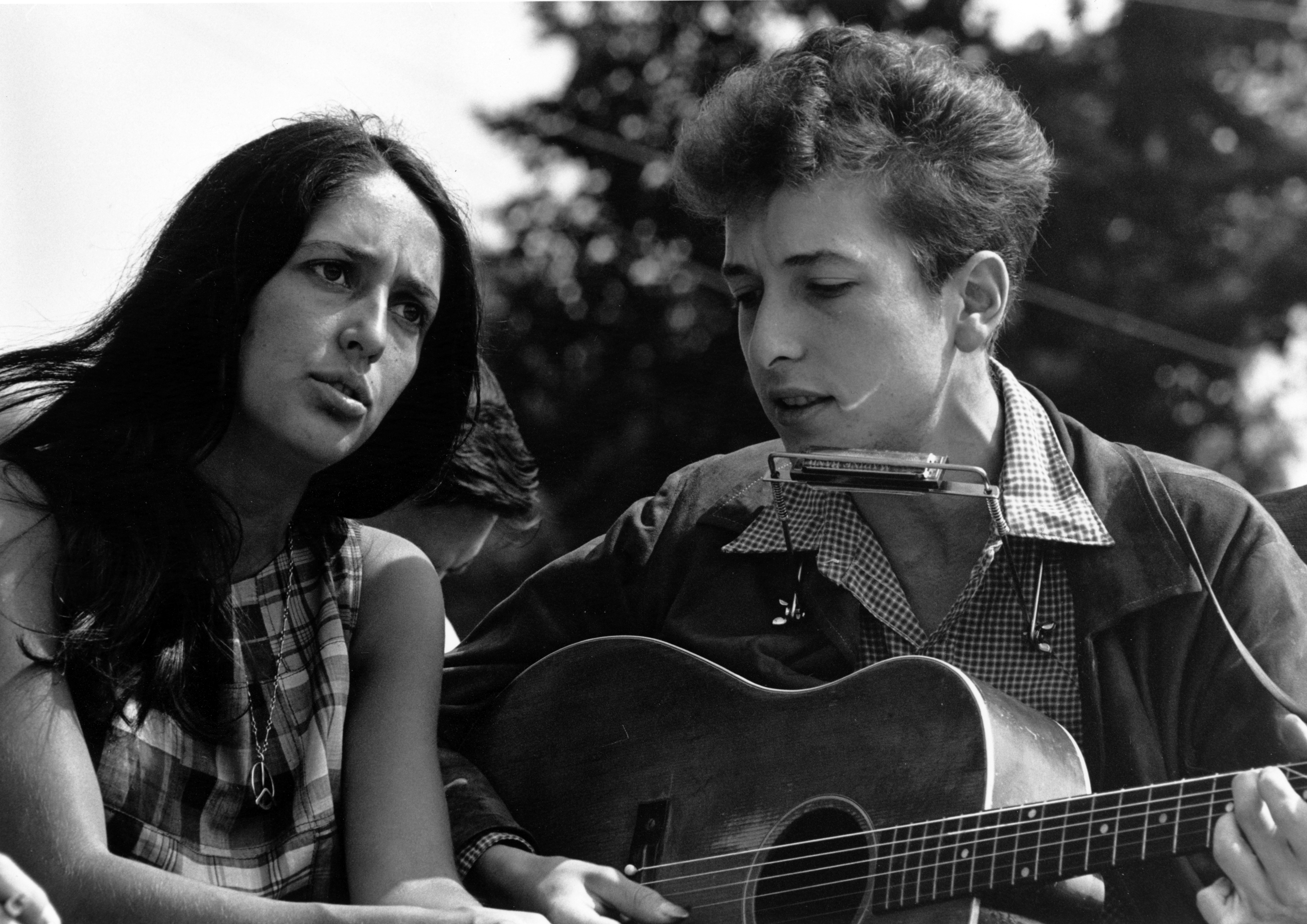
Baez with Bob Dylan at the civil rights March on Washington, 1963

Baez first met Dylan in April 1961 at Gerde's Folk City in New York City's Greenwich Village. Baez had already released her debut album and her popularity as the emerging "Queen of Folk" was on the rise. Baez was initially unimpressed with the "urban hillbilly", but she liked one of Dylan's first compositions, "Song to Woody" and remarked that she would like to record it. By 1963, Baez had released three albums, two of which had been certified gold, and she invited Dylan on stage to perform alongside her at the Newport Folk Festival. The two performed the Dylan composition "With God on Our Side", a collaboration that set the stage for many more duets in the months and years to come. Typically, while on tour, Baez would invite Dylan to sing on stage partly by himself and partly with her, much to the chagrin of her fans.

Before meeting Dylan, Baez's topical songs were few: "Last Night I Had the Strangest Dream", "We Shall Overcome", and an assortment of spirituals. Baez would later say that Dylan's songs seemed to update the topics of protest and justice. By the time of Dylan's 1965 tour of the UK, their relationship had slowly begun to deteriorate. The couple were captured in D. A. Pennebaker's documentary film Dont Look Back (1967). Baez later described it as an abrupt halt that broke her heart, while also acknowledging that she had tried too hard to mold and pressure Dylan into her ideology rather than accepting his artistic trajectory. In the 2023 documentary I Am a Noise Baez referred to the relationship as "totally demoralizing" but said that she had let go of any lingering feelings of resentment after painting a portrait of Dylan while listening to his music, although they are no longer in touch with each other.

Baez toured with Dylan as a performer on his Rolling Thunder Revue in 1975–76. She sang four songs with Dylan on the live album of the tour, The Bootleg Series Vol. 5: Bob Dylan Live 1975, The Rolling Thunder Revue, released in 2002. Baez appeared with Dylan in the one-hour TV special Hard Rain, filmed at Fort Collins, Colorado, in May 1976. Baez also starred as 'The Woman in White' in the film Renaldo and Clara (1978), directed by Bob Dylan and filmed during the Rolling Thunder Revue. They performed together at the Peace Sunday anti-nuke concert in 1982. Dylan and Baez toured together again in 1984 along with Carlos Santana. Baez discussed her relationship with Dylan in Martin Scorsese's documentary film No Direction Home (2005), and in the PBS American Masters biography of Baez, How Sweet the Sound (2009).

Baez wrote and composed at least three songs that were specifically about Dylan. In "To Bobby", written in 1972, she urged Dylan to return to political activism, while in "Diamonds & Rust", the title track from her 1975 album, she revisited her feelings for him in warm, yet direct terms. "Winds of the Old Days", also on the Diamonds & Rust album, is a bittersweet reminiscence about her time with "Bobby". The references to Baez in Dylan's songs are far less clear. Baez herself has suggested that she was the subject of both "Visions of Johanna" and "Mama, You Been on My Mind", although the latter was more likely about his relationship with Suze Rotolo. Dylan's "To Ramona" is potentially also about Baez. In the liner notes of his 1985 compilation album Biograph, Dylan stated that the song was "pretty literal. That was just somebody I knew"; and in her 1987 biography And A Voice To Sing With, Baez wrote about how Dylan would call her "Ramona". Baez implied when speaking about the connection to "Diamonds and Rust" that "Lily, Rosemary and the Jack of Hearts" is, at least in part, a metaphor for Dylan's view of his relationship with her. As for "Like A Rolling Stone", "Visions of Johanna", "She Belongs to Me", and other songs alleged to have been written about Baez, neither Dylan nor biographers such as Clinton Heylin and Michael Gray have had anything definitive to say either way regarding the subject of these songs.

Baez's relationship with Dylan was also referenced in the 2024 film A Complete Unknown.

=== David Harris ===
In October 1967, Baez, her mother, and nearly 70 other women were arrested at the Oakland, California, Armed Forces Induction Center for blocking its doorways to prevent entrance by young inductees, and in support of young men who refused military induction. They were incarcerated in the Santa Rita Jail, and it was here that Baez met David Harris, who was kept on the men's side but who still managed to visit with Baez regularly. The two formed a close bond upon their release and Baez moved into his draft-resistance commune in the hills above Stanford, California. The pair had known each other for three months when they decided to marry. After confirming the news to Associated Press, media outlets began dedicating ample press to the impending nuptials (at one point, Time magazine referred to the event as the "Wedding of the Century").

After finding a pacifist preacher and a church outfitted with peace signs and writing a blend of Episcopalian and Quaker wedding vows, Baez and Harris married in New York City on March 26, 1968. Her friend Judy Collins sang at the ceremony. After the wedding, Baez and Harris moved into a home in Los Altos Hills, California on 10 acres (4.0 hectares) of land called Struggle Mountain, part of a commune, where they tended gardens.

A short time later, Harris refused induction into the armed forces and was indicted. On July 16, 1969, Harris was taken by federal marshals to prison. Baez was visibly pregnant in public in the months that followed, especially at the Woodstock Festival, where she performed a handful of songs in the early morning. The documentary film Carry It On was produced during this period and was released in 1970. The film's behind-the-scenes looks at Harris's views and arrest and Baez on her subsequent performance tour was positively reviewed in Time magazine and The New York Times.

Among the songs Baez wrote about this period of her life are "A Song for David", "Myths", "Prison Trilogy (Billy Rose)" and "Fifteen Months" (the amount of time Harris was imprisoned). Their son Gabriel was born on December 2, 1969. Harris was released from Texas prison after 15 months, but they separated three months after his release and the couple divorced amicably in 1973. They shared custody of Gabriel, who lived primarily with Baez. Explaining the split, Baez wrote in her autobiography: "I am made to live alone." Baez and Harris remained on friendly terms throughout the years; they reunited on-camera for the 2009 American Masters documentary for the USA's PBS. Their son Gabriel is a drummer and occasionally tours with his mother. He has a daughter Jasmine who also sang with Joan Baez at Kidztock in 2010.

=== Steve Jobs ===
Baez dated Apple Computer cofounder Steve Jobs during the early 1980s. A number of sources have stated that Jobs—then in his mid-twenties—had considered asking Baez to marry him, except that her age at the time (early 40s) made the possibility of their having children unlikely. Baez mentioned Jobs in the acknowledgments in her 1987 memoir And a Voice to Sing With and performed at the memorial for him in 2011. After Jobs's death, Baez spoke fondly about him, stating that even after the relationship had ended, the two remained friends, with Jobs having visited Baez a few months before he died. Baez remarked that "Steve had a very sweet side, even if he was as... erratic as he was famous for being. But he gets genius license for that, because he was somebody who changed the world."

== In popular culture ==
- Cartoonist Al Capp, creator of the comic strip Li'l Abner, satirized Baez as "Joanie Phoanie" during the 1960s. Capp's character Joanie was an unabashed communist radical who sang songs of class warfare while hypocritically traveling in a limousine and charging outrageous performance fees to impoverished orphans. Baez asked for a retraction and said at the time that Capp was contributing to "confusion and violence" with his comic strip. Capp retorted: "Joanie Phoanie is a repulsive, egomaniacal, un-American, non-taxpaying horror, I see no resemblance to Joan Baez whatsoever, but if Miss Baez wants to prove it, let her." Capp had this character singing songs such as "A Tale of Bagels and Bacon" and "Molotov Cocktails for Two". Although Baez was upset by the parody in 1966, she admits to being more amused in later years. "I wish I could have laughed at this at the time", she wrote in a caption under one of the strips, reprinted in her autobiography. "Mr. Capp confused me considerably. I'm sorry he's not alive to read this, it would make him chuckle."
- Baez's serious persona was parodied several times on the American variety show Saturday Night Live in impersonations by Nora Dunn, notably in the 1986 mock game show Make Joan Baez Laugh.
- Baez is portrayed by Monica Barbaro in the 2024 Bob Dylan biopic A Complete Unknown.

== Discography ==
- Folksingers 'Round Harvard Square (1959)
- Joan Baez (1960)
- Joan Baez, Vol. 2 (1961)
- Joan Baez in Concert (1962)
- Joan Baez in Concert, Part 2 (1963)
- Joan Baez/5 (1964)
- Farewell, Angelina (1965)
- Noël (1966)
- Joan (1967)
- Baptism: A Journey Through Our Time (1968)
- Any Day Now (1968)
- David's Album (1969)
- One Day at a Time (1970)
- Sacco & Vanzetti (1971)
- Carry It On (1971)
- Blessed Are... (1971)
- Come from the Shadows (1972)
- Where Are You Now, My Son? (1973)
- Gracias a la Vida (1974)
- Diamonds & Rust (1975)
- Gulf Winds (1976)
- Blowin' Away (1977)
- Honest Lullaby (1979)
- Recently (1987)
- Diamonds & Rust in the Bullring (1988)
- Speaking of Dreams (1989)
- Play Me Backwards (1992)
- Gone from Danger (1997)
- Dark Chords on a Big Guitar (2003)
- Day After Tomorrow (2008)
- Whistle Down the Wind (2018)

== Filmography ==
- The March on Washington (1963)
- The March (1964)
- The Big T.N.T. Show (1966)
- Dont Look Back (1967)
- Festival (1967)
- Woodstock (1970)
- Carry It On (1970)
- Woody Guthrie All-Star Tribute Concert (1970)
- Celebration at Big Sur (1971)
- Dynamite Chicken (1971)
- Earl Scruggs: The Bluegrass Legend – Family & Friends (1972)
- Sing Sing Thanksgiving (1974)
- The Making of Silent Running (1974)
- A War is Over (1975)
- Banjoman (1975)
- Bob Dylan: Hard Rain (TV Special, 1976)
- The Memory of Justice (1976)
- Renaldo and Clara (1978)
- There but for Fortune – Joan Baez in Central America (TV documentary, 1982)
- Sag nein (1983)
- In Our Hands (1984)
- Woody Guthrie: Hard Travelin' (1984)
- Live Aid (1985)
- In Remembrance of Martin (1986)
- We Shall Overcome (1989)
- Woodstock: The Lost Performances (1990)
- Kris Kristofferson: His Life and Work (1993)
- Life and Times of Allen Ginsberg (1993)
- Woodstock Diary (1994)
- A Century of Women (1994)
- The History of Rock 'n' Roll (1995)
- Rock & Roll (1995)
- Message to Love: Isle of Wight Festival 1970 (1996)
- Tree Sit: The Art of Resistance (2001)
- Smothered: The Censorship Struggles of The Smothers Brothers Comedy Hour (2002)
- Soundstage: Joan Baez, Gillian Welch and Nickel Creek (2004)
- Fahrenheit 9/11: A Movement in Time (2004)
- Words and Music in Honor of Fahrenheit 9/11 (2005)
- The Carter Family: Will the Circle Be Unbroken (2005)
- No Direction Home (2005)
- Captain Mike Across America (2007)
- Pete Seeger: The Power of Song (2007)
- 65 Revisited (2007)
- The Other Side of the Mirror (2007)
- South Central Farm: Oasis in a Concrete Desert. (2008)
- Fierce Light: When Spirit Meets Action (2008)
- The Power of Their Song: The Untold Story of Latin America's New Song Movement (2008)
- Joan Baez: How Sweet the Sound (2009)
- Hugh Hefner: Playboy, Activist and Rebel (2009)
- Leonard Cohen: Live at the Isle of Wight 1970 (2009)
- Welcome to Eden (2009)
- In Performance at the White House: A Celebration of Music from the Civil Rights Movement (2010)
- Phil Ochs: There but for Fortune (2010)
- Save the Farm (2011)
- For the Love of the Music: The Club 47 Folk Revival (2012)
- The March (2013)
- Another Day, Another Time: Celebrating the Music of 'Inside Llewyn Davis' (2014)
- The Stars Behind the Iron Curtain (2014)
- Sharon Isbin: Troubadour (2014)
- Snapshots from the Tour (2015)
- Taylor Swift: The 1989 World Tour Live (2015)
- Joan Baez: Rebel Icon (2015)
- King in the Wilderness (2018)
- Hugh Hefner's After Dark: Speaking Out in America (2018)
- Don't Get Trouble In Your Mind: The Carolina Chocolate Drops' Story (2019)
- Rolling Thunder Revue: A Bob Dylan Story by Martin Scorsese (2019)
- Woodstock (2019)
- The Boys Who Said No!
- Joan Baez: I Am a Noise (2023)

== See also ==
- List of barefooters
- List of peace activists

== Notes ==
Awards
| Preceded by Mavis Staples | First Amendment Center/AMA "Spirit of Americana" Free Speech Award; 2008 | Succeeded by Mary Chapin Carpenter |
