= Yesterday's Gone: The Complete Ember & World Artists Recordings =

Compilation album by Chad & Jeremy
- Released: 19 August 2016 (UK)
- Genre: Folk rock; soft rock
- Label: Cherry Red Records

Yesterday's Gone: The Complete Ember & World Artists Recordings is a complete collection of all of Chad & Jeremy's music from the early years of their career, 1963 and 1964. It contains all of their recordings for Ember Records in the UK and World Artists Records in the US.

Disc one includes the US LPs Yesterday's Gone (1964) and Chad & Jeremy Sing for You (1965) in their entirety, plus the duo's contributions to the various artists LP Live Folk From The Mayfair Theatre London, recorded October 12, 1963. The May Fair Hotel opened in 1927 and houses the Mayfair Theatre London, which opened the same year as this concert.

Disc two includes all of the mono singles plus outtakes, alternative takes and stereo versions of non-LP tracks. The London studio sessions were produced by John Barry (composer) & Shel Talmy. The New York sessions were produced by Jimmie Haskell. The London sessions include six live tracks, freshly remastered from the original Ember tape sources. A previously unreleased track, 'Lemon Tree' (stereo version), is included, plus the first official release of 'It Was A Very Good Year' (stereo version) and 'From A Window' (alternative take).

This compilation was released by the UK label Cherry Red Records on 19 August 2016.

== Track listing ==
The album contains 57 tracks on two CDs:

=== Disc 1 ===
Tracks 1–12 are the stereo U.S. LP, Yesterday's Gone:

1. "A Summer Song" (Chad Stuart, Clive Metcalfe, Keith Noble) – 2:38
2. "Now and Forever" (Martin Dean) – 1:45
3. "Dirty Old Town" (Ewan MacColl) – 3:04
4. "Like I Love You Today" (Russell Alquist, Chad Stuart) – 2:38
5. "September in the Rain" (Harry Warren, Al Dubin) – 2:30
6. "Yesterday's Gone" (Chad Stuart, Wendy Kidd) – 2:29
7. "If She Was Mine" (Bobby Goldsboro, Buddy Buie) – 2:03
8. "Willow Weep for Me" (Ann Ronell)– 2:33
9. "Only for the Young" (instrumental) (Jimmy Seals) – 2:55
10. "Too Soon My Love" (Russell Alquist) – 2:28
11. "The Truth Often Hurts the Heart" (Clive Metcalfe, Keith Noble) – 2:49
12. "No Tears for Johnnie" (Tom Springfield) – 2:58

Tracks 13–24 are the stereo U.S. LP, Chad & Jeremy Sing for You:

13. "My Coloring Book" (Fred Ebb, John Kander) – 2:26
14. "What Do You Want With Me" (Chad Stuart, Jeremy Clyde) – 2:05
15. "From a Window" (John Lennon, Paul McCartney) – 2:06
16. "If You've Got a Heart" (Bobby Goldsboro) – 2:47
17. "No Other Baby" (Dickie Bishop, Bob Watson) – 2:35
18. "Donna, Donna" (Traditional) – 2:58
19. "The Girl from Ipanema" (Antônio Carlos Jobim, Vinicius de Moraes, Norman Gimbel) – 2:01
20. "Four Strong Winds" (Ian Tyson)– 2:39
21. "Only Those in Love" (Russell Alquist, Chad Stuart) – 2:13
22. "You Know What" – 2:05
23. "Sleep Little Boy" (Russell Alquist) – 2:26
24. "My How the Time Goes By" (Russell Alquist, Chad Stuart) – 2:03

Tracks 25–30 are from the Various Artists LP, Live Folk:

25. "If I Had My Way"
26. "This Morning"
27. "Ain't That Just Like Me"
28. "If I Had a Hammer"
29. "Yesterday's Gone"
30. "Stanley and Dora"

=== Disc 2 ===
Tracks 1–17 are the original mono singles:

1. "Yesterday's Gone"
2. "Lemon Tree"
3. "Like I Love You Today"
4. "Early in the Morning"
5. "A Summer Song" (Unison Vocal Intro)
6. "No Tears for Johnnie"
7. "A Summer Song" (Traded Vocal Intro)
8. "Willow Weep for Me"
9. "If She Was Mine"
10. "If I Loved You"
11. "Donna, Donna"
12. "What Do You Want with Me"
13. "It Was a Very Good Year"
14. "From a Window" (Acoustic Guitar Solo)
15. "My Coloring Book"
16. "September in the Rain"
17. "Only for the Young"

Tracks 18–27 are outtakes, alternate takes, and various stereo mixes:

18. "Yesterday's Gone" (alternate take minus solo guitar overdub, stereo)
19. "Lemon Tree" (stereo version)
20. "Your Mama's Out of Town" (stereo)
21. "A Summer Song" (traded vocal intro, stereo)
22. "From a Window" (backing track, mono)
23. "If I Loved You" (stereo)
24. "It Was a Very Good Year" (stereo)
25. "From a Window" (electric guitar solo, stereo)
26. "The Nearness of You" (stereo)
27. "From a Window" (alternate take minus solo guitar overdub, stereo)
