= Chad Stuart =

British musician (1941–2020)

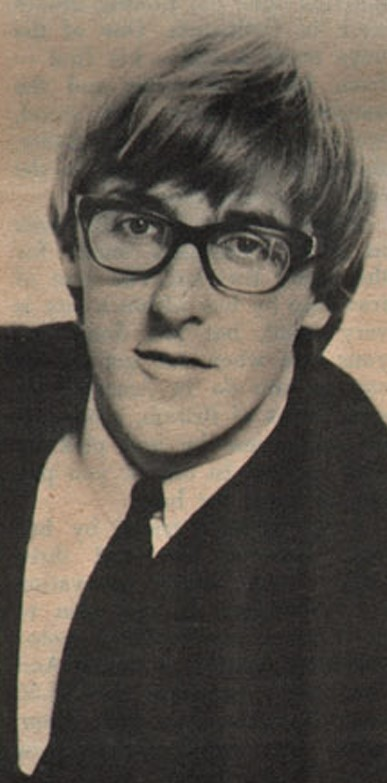
- Stuart in 1965
- Born: David Stuart Chadwick; 10 December 1941; Windermere, Westmorland, England
- Died: 20 December 2020 (aged 79); Hailey, Idaho, U.S.
- Occupations: Musician, producer
- Years active: 1960–2018
- Spouse(s): Jill Gibson (m. 1964; divorced); Valerie Romero (divorced) Judy Shelly (m. 2010)
- Children: James Patrick Stuart

David Stuart Chadwick (10 December 1941 – 20 December 2020), better known by his stage name Chad Stuart, was an English musician. He was one half of the duo Chad & Jeremy.

Stuart has writing credits on four of the 11 Chad & Jeremy songs which entered the U.S. Hot 100. Stuart has sole credit for the duo's first hit, "Yesterday's Gone" (their only hit in the UK), and credits on "You Are She" (Stuart/Clyde), and "A Summer Song" (Stuart/Metcalfe/Noble), and "What Do You Want With Me" (Stuart/Clyde).

== Early life ==
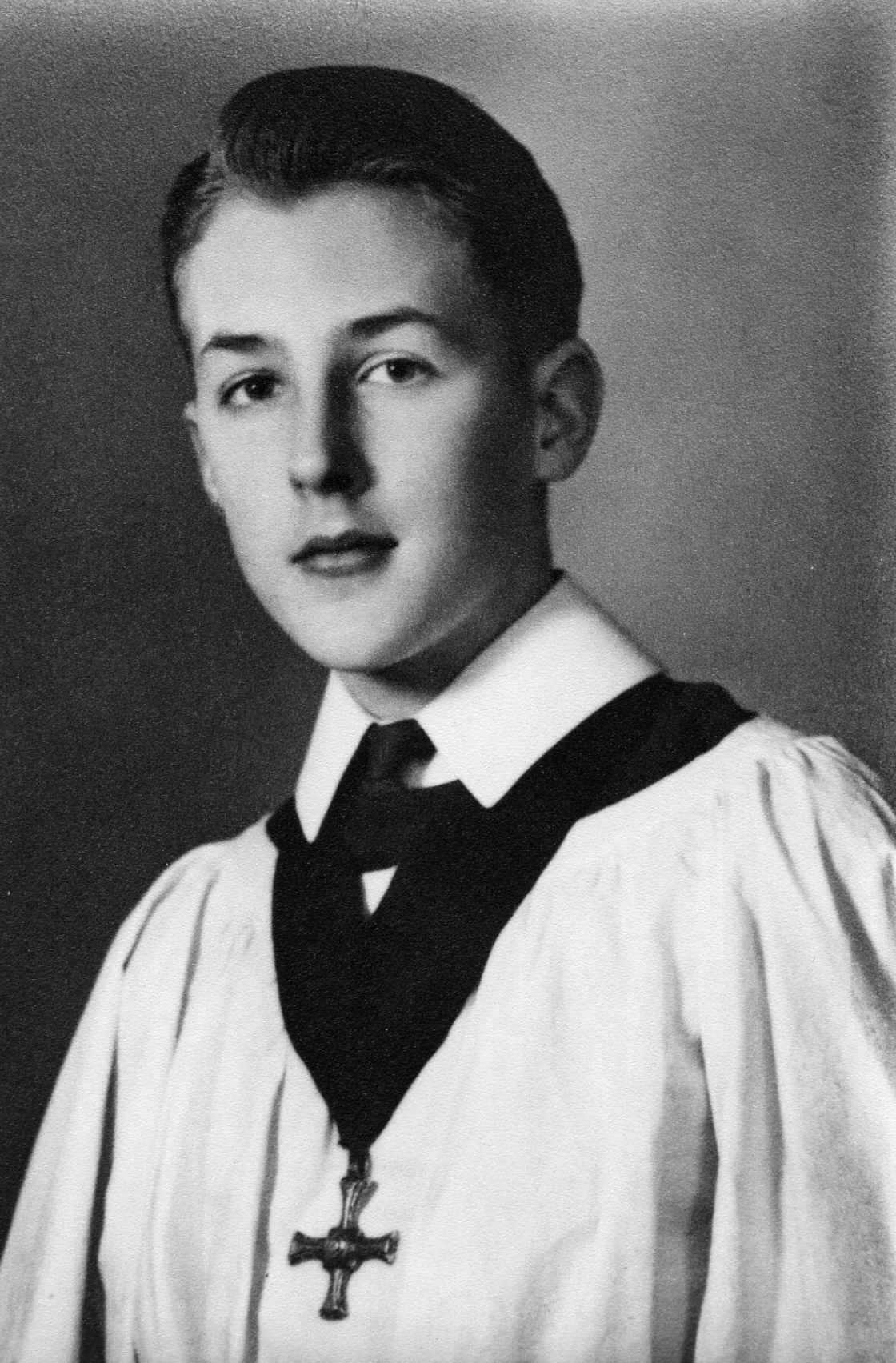
A young Stuart in 1959, while attending the Durham Cathedral Chorister School

Stuart was born on 10 December 1941 in Windermere, Westmorland, a town in the North West of England. His father, Frank Chadwick, was a foreman in the lumber industry and his mother, Frieda Chadwick (née Bedford), was a nurse. At five, Stuart's family moved to Hartlepool in the North East of England when his father's job was transferred.

At 10, Stuart was recognized for his musical talent and earned a scholarship to attend the Durham Cathedral Chorister School. After graduation, Stuart briefly attended an art school for a year before switching to drama. Stuart won a scholarship to the Central School of Speech and Drama in London. There, Stuart met fellow student Jeremy Clyde.

== Career ==
Stuart began working with Clyde as the British music duo Chad & Jeremy in 1962 and they had their first hit song in the UK with "Yesterday's Gone" (1963). That song became a hit in the United States in the following year as part of the British Invasion. The duo had a string of hits in the United States, including "Willow Weep for Me", "Before and After", and their biggest hit, "A Summer Song". Stuart also voiced one of the vultures in the 1967 film adaptation of The Jungle Book. After some commercial failures and divergent personal ambitions, Chad & Jeremy disbanded in 1968.

In 1970, he produced the album Gift of Song for the Australian singer-songwriter Judith Durham.

In the early 1980s, the duo reunited to record a new album and perform concerts, including a multi-band British Invasion nostalgia tour.

Following the breakup of Chad & Jeremy, Stuart worked as a staff producer at A&M Records and musical director for the Smothers Brothers. Over the years, Stuart and Clyde reunited to record and tour. In 2003, the duo were officially reunited again and had a semi-regular touring schedule until Stuart's retirement in 2016.

On 20 December 2020, Stuart died of pneumonia following a fall.

== Personal life ==
Stuart was called Chad as a teenager and in 1964 legally changed his name. In 1964, Stuart married his first wife, English model Jill Gibson, whom he met while attending the Central School of Speech and Drama.

Stuart has several children and step-children. One of Stuart's sons, from his first marriage, is American television, film, and voice actor James Patrick Stuart.

Stuart later settled in the state of Idaho in the northwestern U.S.A.

Stuart supported and donated to Habitat for Humanity, the Humane Society, Horse Rescue, and other benefits. All profits from CD sales of his 2013 album Chad Stuart & the KGB went to stopping the slaughter of wild horses.

== Partial discography ==
=== With Chad & Jeremy ===
- Yesterday's Gone (July 1964)
- Chad & Jeremy Sing for You (January 1965)
- Before and After (1965)
- I Don't Want to Lose You Baby (1965)
- Second Album (1966)
- Distant Shores (1966)
- Of Cabbages and Kings (1967)
- The Ark (1968)
- 3 in the Attic (1968)
- Chad Stuart & Jeremy Clyde (1983)
- In Concert (The Official Bootleg) (2002)
- Ark-eology (2008)
- Fifty Years On (2010)
- Rien ne va Plus (2013)

=== Solo ===
- "The Cruel War"/"I Can't Talk to You" (Chad & Jill single, 1966)
- Don't Argue with an Elephant (2010)
- Chad Stuart and the KGB (2013)

=== As producer ===
(List may be incomplete)

Year	Album	Artist
1969	Celebration of Life Stuart also arranged	Gale Caldwell
1969	Tarantula	Taratula
1970	Silent Song Through the Land	Ron Davies
1970	At Home Producers: Glyn Johns, David Anderle, Chad Stuart	Lambert & Nuttycombe
1970	Gift of Song	Judith Durham
1977	Tiny Little Star Producers: Chad Stuart, Jimmie Haskell	Harry Sonoda
1983	Chad Stuart & Jeremy Clyde Executive producer: Gary Davis	Chad & Jeremy
2002	Phil Hartman's Flat TV	Phil Hartman
