= At Home =

At Home may refer to:

== Books ==
- At Home, a book of collected essays by Gore Vidal
- At Home, a recipe book by Heston Blumenthal
- At Home (book), a 2022 cookbook by Gavin Kaysen and Nick Fauchald
- At Home: A Short History of Private Life, a 2010 book by Bill Bryson
- "At Home" (short story), an 1887 short story by Anton Chekhov

== Film and television ==
- At Home (TV series), a 1940s television series
- Heima, a 2007 feature film by Icelandic band Sigur Rós

== Music ==
- Bei uns Z'haus, a waltz composed by Johann Strauss II
- At Home, album by Lambert and Nuttycombe 1970
- At Home (Cherish the Ladies album), 1999
- At Home (Shocking Blue album), 1969
- At Home (Avishai Cohen album), an album by Avishai Cohen
- At Home (With Family), an album by Eddie Hazel
- "At Home" (song), a 2011 song by Crystal Fighters

== Companies and organizations ==
- At Home, a program for homeless people with mental illnesses by the Mental Health Commission of Canada
- At Home (store), an American chain of home decor stores.

== See also ==
- @Home (disambiguation)
