= Joan Baez (album) =

Studio album by Joan Baez
- Released: October 1960
- Recorded: July 1960
- Studio: Manhattan Towers Hotel Ballroom, New York City
- Genre: Folk
- Length: 46:02
- Label: Vanguard VSD-2077
- Producer: Maynard Solomon

Joan Baez chronology
Folksingers 'Round Harvard Square (1960)	Joan Baez (1960)	Joan Baez, Vol. 2 (1961)

Joan Baez, also known as Joan Baez, Vol. 1, is the debut solo album by folk singer Joan Baez. The album was recorded in the summer of 1960 and released the same year. The original release featured 13 traditional folk songs. Later reissues included three additional songs.

In 2015, the album was selected for induction into National Recording Registry of the Library of Congress for special recognition and preservation as one of the sound recordings in over 130 years of recording history that has "cultural, artistic and/or historical significance to American society and the nation's audio legacy".

== History ==
Baez came to prominence during the Folk Music Revival in the late 1950s, particularly in the first Newport Folk Festival in July 1959. A number of companies tried to sign her after her performance at the music festival, including Columbia, but she chose to go instead with the small independent label, Vanguard. Baez recorded the album for the label in the summer of 1960, when she was 19.

Most of the songs featured only Baez' vocals and guitar, with a second guitar (played by Fred Hellerman, of The Weavers), added to some songs. The album went gold, although it did not make the Billboard 200 chart until August 17,1963, following the success of her third album, Joan Baez in Concert. Joan Baez peaked at number 20 and spent 140 weeks on the chart.

In 1983 Baez described the making of the album to Rolling Stone's Kurt Loder:

It took four nights. We were in some big, smelly ballroom at a hotel on Broadway, way up by the river. We couldn't record on Wednesday nights because they played bingo there. I would be down there on this dirty old rug with two microphones, one for the voice and one for the guitar. I just did my set; it was probably all I knew. Just put 'em down. I did "Mary Hamilton" once, that was it. That's the way we made 'em in the old days. As long as a dog didn't run through the room or something, you had it.

Vanguard issued Joan Baez in Germany, with a different cover but the same liner notes (VSD 8001).

In 2001, Vanguard reissued Joan Baez with new liner notes and three previously unreleased songs. (Between 2001 and 2005, they reissued remastered versions of Baez' 13 original albums with the label.)

In 2014, Waxtime Records reissued Joan Baez with new liner notes and only two bonus tracks from earlier Baez sessions that were originally released in 1959 on the compilation LP Folksingers' Round Harvard Square.

== Reception ==
Professional ratings
Review scores
Source	Rating
AllMusic	5/5 stars
DownBeat	4/5 stars
The Rolling Stone Record Guide	4/5 stars

In his AllMusic review, music critic Bruce Eder commented that the purity of the sound was notable at the time. He wrote of the album "Baez gives a fine account of the most reserved and least confrontational aspects of the folk revival, presenting a brace of traditional songs (most notably "East Virginia" and "Mary Hamilton") with an urgency and sincerity that makes the listener feel as though they were being sung for the first time".

Pete Welding in his DownBeat review wrote, "Her performances of the tunes — most of them traditional Anglo-American ballads of a decided plaintive cast — are dulcet, pensive, and haunting, marked by a glowing ardour and a sincere attempt to penetrate to their essence . . . She is blessed with a clear soprano voice of uncommon beauty and an impressive instrumental facility . . . this is a fine, thoughtful, and moving collection, exquisitely performed".

=== Accolades ===
The album was included in Robert Dimery's 1001 Albums You Must Hear Before You Die.

In 2015, the album was deemed "culturally, historically, or aesthetically significant" by the Library of Congress and selected for inclusion in the National Recording Registry.

== Track listing ==
No.	Title	Writer(s)	Length
1.	"Silver Dagger"	Traditional, arr. Joan Baez	2:32
2.	"East Virginia"	Traditional, arr. Joan Baez	3:44
3.	"Fare Thee Well (10,000 Miles)"	Traditional, arr. David Gude	3:22
4.	"House of the Rising Sun"	Traditional, arr. Joan Baez	2:56
5.	"All My Trials"	Traditional, arr. Joan Baez	4:41
6.	"Wildwood Flower"	Traditional, arr. Joan Baez	2:37
7.	"Donna Donna"	Sholom Secunda, Aaron Zeitlin, Arthur Kevess, Teddi Schwartz	3:15
8.	"John Riley"	Traditional, arr. Joan Baez	3:54
9.	"Rake and Rambling Boy"	Traditional, arr. Joan Baez	1:59
10.	"Little Moses"	Traditional, arr. Joan Baez	3:31
11.	"Mary Hamilton"	Traditional, arr. Joan Baez	5:58
12.	"Henry Martin"	Traditional, arr. Joan Baez	4:15
13.	"El Preso Número Nueve"	Roberto Cantoral	2:48

Reissue bonus tracks
No.	Title	Writer(s)	Length
14.	"Girl of Constant Sorrow"	Traditional, arr. Joan Baez	1:46
15.	"I Know You Rider"	Traditional, arr. Joan Baez	3:46
16.	"John Riley" (extended version)	Traditional, arr. Joan Baez	4:23

== Charts and certifications ==
=== Charts ===
Chart	Peak position
German Albums (Offizielle Top 100)	38
UK Albums (OCC)	9
US Billboard 200	20

=== Certifications ===
Region	Certification	Certified units/sales
United Kingdom (BPI)	Silver	60,000^{^}
United States (RIAA)	Gold	500,000^{^}
^{^} Shipments figures based on certification alone.
