= James Patrick Stuart =

American actor

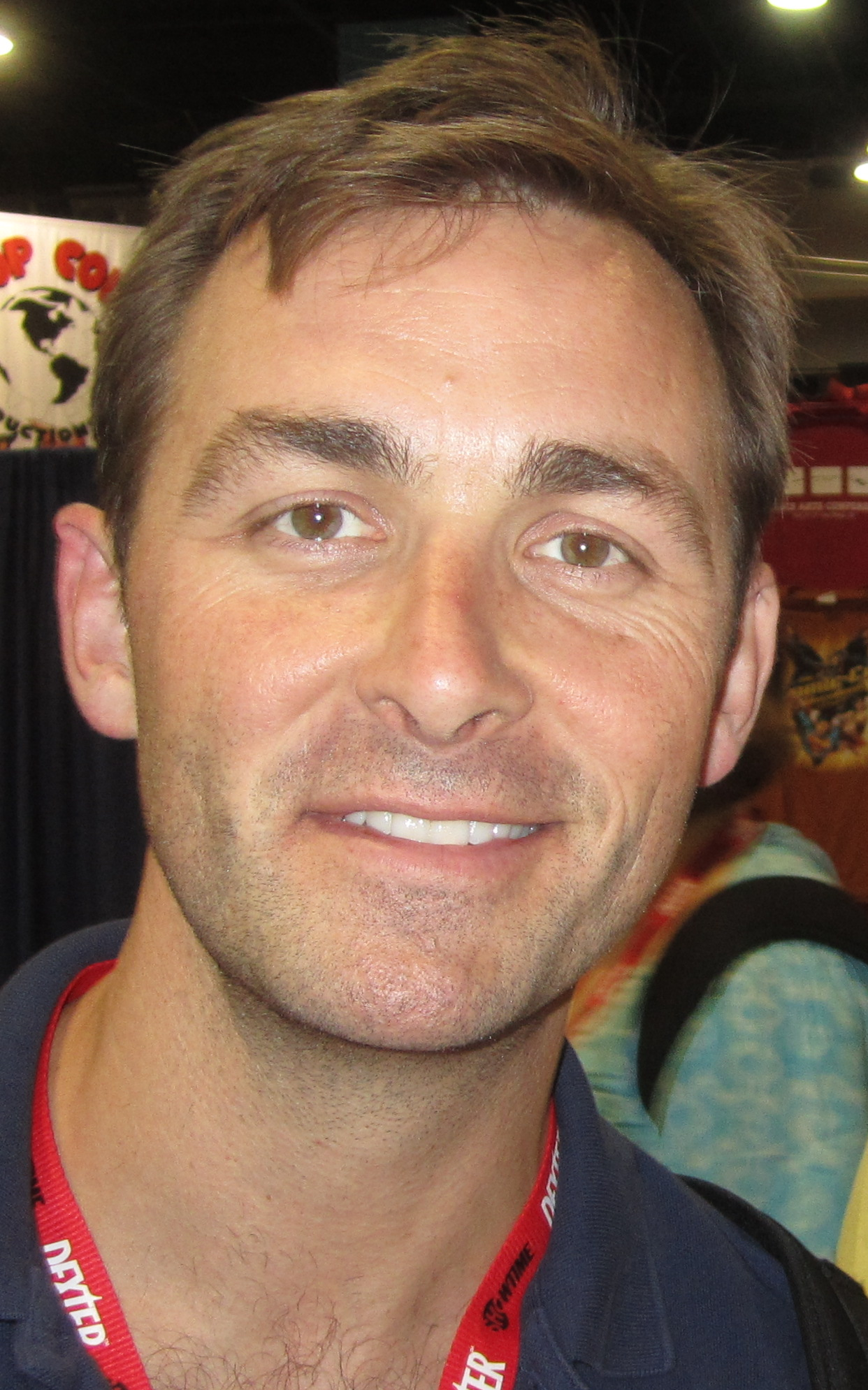
- Stuart at the 2010 San Diego Comic Con
- Born: June 16, 1968 (age 58); California
- Occupation: Actor
- Years active: 1980–present
- Spouse: Jocelyn Stuart (m. 2000)
- Children: 2
- Relatives: Chad Stuart (father)
- Website: jamespatrickstuart.com

James Patrick Stuart (born June 16, 1968) is an American actor. He portrays Valentin Cassadine on the daytime soap opera General Hospital, for which he received three consecutive Daytime Emmy Award nominations for Outstanding Supporting Actor in a Drama Series in 2020, 2021 and 2022.

== Early life ==
Stuart was born in California to English parents Chad and Jill Gibson Stuart. His songwriter father was one-half of the 1960s British Invasion duo Chad & Jeremy; because of this, Stuart spent much of his childhood in recording studios. As a wannabe child actor, he talked his parents into taking him to nighttime tapings of sitcoms such as Happy Days and Mork and Mindy. Acting under the name Patrick Stuart, he was spotted by a talent agent in a local production of A Christmas Carol and landed the role of Dr. Zee in the short-lived TV series Galactica 1980. His parents moved to Laguna Beach, California, where he went to high school. He spent two years in San Francisco State University's drama department before dropping out in 1988 to move back to Hollywood, where he studied at Stella Adler's acting school under Arthur Mendoza and Joanne Linville.

== Career ==
In 1989, Stuart was cast in the soap opera All My Children as Will Cortlandt and was nominated for a Daytime Emmy Award for Outstanding Younger Actor in 1992. In 1990 he made a brief appearance in the film Pretty Woman as a bellhop. He played Confederate Colonel Edward Porter Alexander in the 1993 film Gettysburg and its 2003 prequel Gods and Generals. In 2009 he was Meryl Streep's would-be plastic surgeon in It's Complicated.

He is known mostly for his work on television, appearing in such shows as Galactica 1980, CSI, Andy Richter Controls the Universe, The Closer, 90210, Still Standing, Reba, Supernatural, Hot in Cleveland, and 2 Broke Girls. In a 1996 episode of Seinfeld, he played Elaine's furniture-designing, "Desperado"-loving boyfriend, Brett. In "The Ski Lodge," a 1998 episode of Frasier, he played Guy, the gay French ski instructor.

He provides the voices of Avalanche in Wolverine and the X-Men, Private the Penguin (replacing Christopher Knights) and Joey the Kangaroo in Nickelodeon's The Penguins of Madagascar, Pvt. MacGregor in Call of Duty 2 and Xigbar in the Kingdom Hearts video games.

Since July 2016 he has played the role of villain Valentin Cassadine on General Hospital.

He starred in the Disney Channel sitcom The Villains of Valley View, from 2022 thru 2023, as the mad scientist Kraniac.

== Personal life ==
Stuart resides in Los Angeles, California, with his wife Jocelyn and their two sons.

His parents were divorced and his father, who died in December 2020, had two subsequent marriages. He has a brother, Andrew, and a half-brother, Beau, as well as several step-brothers and step-sisters.

== Filmography ==
=== Film ===
Year	Title	Role	Notes
1990	Pretty Woman	Day Bellhop	Romantic comedy film directed by Garry Marshall.
1993	Gettysburg	Colonel E. Porter Alexander	Epic war film written and directed by Ronald F. Maxwell.; Adapted from the novel The Killer Angels by Michael Shaara.
1998	The Fix	David	Film directed by Richard Zelniker.
2003	Gods and Generals	Colonel E. Porter Alexander	Period war drama film written and directed by Ronald F. Maxwell.; Adapted from the novel of the same name by Jeffrey Shaara and prequel Gettysburg.
2005	Cruel World	Deputy Grady	Horror comedy film directed by Kelsey T. Howard.
2008	Remarkable Power	News Anchor	Comedy film directed by Brandon Beckner.
2008	The Man Who Came Back	Billy Duke	Revisionist Western film directed by Glen Pitre.
2008	Jack Rio	Michael Applebaum	Thriller film directed by Gregori J. Martin.
2009	Imagine That	Mr. Pratt	Comedy film directed by Karey Kirkpatrick.
2009	It's Complicated	Dr. Moss	Romantic comedy film written and directed by Nancy Meyers.
2010	Scooby-Doo! Abracadabra-Doo	Whirlen Merlin (voice)	Direct-to-video
2010	Justice League: Crisis on Two Earths	Johnny Quick (voice)	Direct-to-video
2011	Batman: Year One	Henchman (voice)	Direct-to-video
2013	Justice League: The Flashpoint Paradox	Steve Trevor (voice)	Direct-to-video
2012	Scooby-Doo! Spooky Games	Jack Riggins, Igor Drozdov (voice)	Direct-to-video
2014	Something Wicked	Bill	Independent psychological horror film directed by Darin Scott.
2017	Surf's Up 2: WaveMania	Interviewer, Announcer (voice)	

=== Television ===
Year	Title	Role	Notes
1980	Galactica 1980	Dr. Zee	Recurring
1989–92	All My Children	Will Cortlandt #2	Contract role
1996	Seinfeld	Brett	Episode: "The Checks"
1996	Sliders	Derek Bond	Episode: "Obsession"
1998	Frasier	Guy	Episode: "The Ski Lodge"
1998	The Simple Life	Greg Champlain	Recurring
1998	Babylon 5: In the Beginning	Presidential Aide	Television film directed by Mike Vejar.
1998–99	Encore! Encore!	Claude Bertrand	Recurring
2001	JAG	Father Harry O'Rourke	2 episodes
2001	The Ellen Show	Guy	Episode: "Vanity Hair"
2002–03	Andy Richter Controls the Universe	Keith	Recurring
2003–05	CSI: Crime Scene Investigation	Attorney Adam Matthews	Recurring
2004–05	Second Time Around	Derek	Recurring
2004–06	Still Standing	Perry	Recurring
2004, 2006	Hi Hi Puffy AmiYumi	Maurice (voice)	2 episodes
2005	Ghost Whisperer	Lew Peterson	Episode: "Lost Boys"
2005	Medium	Stephen Garner	Episode: "Judge, Jury and Executioner"
2005	Duck Dodgers	Chancellor Flippauralius (voice)	Episode: "The Fins of War"
2005, 2007	American Dad!	Bartender, Mr. Perkins, Parishioner (voice)	2 episodes
2006–08	Emily's Reasons Why Not	The Boss	Recurring
2006–09	The Closer	Deputy D.A. Garnett	Recurring
2008–09	90210	Charles Clark	Recurring
2008–09	Wolverine and the X-Men	Avalanche (voice)	4 episodes
2008–15	The Penguins of Madagascar	Private (voice)	Main cast
2009–11	True Jackson, VP	Burt Burlington	3 episodes
2010	Phineas and Ferb	Additional voices	Episode: "The Beak"
2011	I'm in the Band	Jack Campbell	Episode: "Raiders of the Lost Dad"
2011	Drop Dead Diva	Attorney Thurman	Episode: "He Said, She Said"
2011–12	Supernatural	Dick Roman	Recurring
2011–12	Hot in Cleveland	Collin Cooper	Recurring
2011–13	Scooby-Doo! Mystery Incorporated	Dr. Rick Spartan, Traveler O'Flaherty (voice)	3 episodes
2012	Bones	Dr. Cole Reese	Episode: "The Method in the Madness"
2012	A Taste of Romance	Gill Callahan	Television film directed by Lee Rose.
2012–13	Winx Club	Mike, Vampire Boy (voice)	7 episodes; Nickelodeon dub
2013	Malibu Country	Mr. Bata	Episode: "New Plans"
2013	Jessie	Lt. Colonel John Wayne "J.W" Prescott	Episode: "G.I. Jessie"
2013	Castle	CIA Agent Ethan Wright	Episode: "Need to Know"
2013	Mad	Scotty, Psyduck Announcer (voice)	Episode: "Old Spock's Off Their Spockers"
2013–14	Monsters vs. Aliens	President Hathaway, Leprechaun (voice)	9 episodes
2014	Beware the Batman	David Hull (voice)	Episode: "Twist"
2014	Turbo Fast	Lombardo, Echidna (voice)	Episode: "The Escargot Affair"
2014	The Mentalist	Gregory Dyer	Episode: "Forest Green"
2014–25	Blaze and the Monster Machines	Zeg, Blue Pirate, Yellow Knight (voice)	39 episodes
2015	2 Broke Girls	Ace	Episode: "And the Fun Factory"
2015	How to Get Away With Murder	Prosecutor	Episode: "It's Called the Octopus"
2015	Be Cool, Scooby-Doo!	Colson McCready (voice)	Episode: "Be Quiet Scooby-Doo!"
2016–17	Lego Star Wars: The Freemaker Adventures	Dengar (voice)	9 episodes
2016–present	General Hospital	Valentin Cassadine, Theo	Recurring
2018	Lego Star Wars: All Stars	Dengar (voice)	2 episodes
2019	Spirit Riding Free	Charlisle, Deputy (voice)	Episode: "The Mystery of the Golden Unicorn"
2019–22	Amphibia	One-Eyed Wally (voice)	16 episodes
2022–23	The Villains of Valley View	Vic Madden/Kraniac	Main role

=== Video games ===
Year	Title	Role	Notes
2005	Call of Duty 2	Pvt. MacGregor	
2005	Kingdom Hearts II	Xigbar	
2005	The Suffering: Ties That Bind	Elroy Jr.	
2009	Ice Age: Dawn of the Dinosaurs	Buck	
2009	Kingdom Hearts 358/2 Days	Xigbar	
2010	Toy Story 3	Additional voices	
2010	Call of Duty: Black Ops	Additional voices	
2010	Kingdom Hearts Birth by Sleep	Braig	
2011	Cars 2: The Video Game	Nigel Gearsley	
2011	Call of Duty: Modern Warfare 3	Additional voices	
2011	Kinect: Disneyland Adventures	Black Barty	
2011	Kung Fu Panda 2	Antelope	
2012	Diablo III	Additional voices	
2012	Kingdom Hearts 3D: Dream Drop Distance	Braig/Xigbar	
2012	The Amazing Spider-Man	Additional voices	
2012	Epic Mickey 2: The Power of Two	Additional voices	
2013	Call of Duty: Ghosts	Additional voices	
2013	Disney Infinity	Additional voices	
2013	Kingdom Hearts HD 1.5 Remix	Xigbar	
2014	Diablo III: Reaper of Souls	Additional voices	
2014	Kingdom Hearts HD 2.5 Remix	Braig/Xigbar	
2015	Disney Infinity 3.0	Additional voices	
2017	Kingdom Hearts HD 2.8 Final Chapter Prologue	Braig/Xigbar	Archival audio
2019	Kingdom Hearts III	Xigbar	
2021	Blaze and the Monster Machines: Axle City Racers	Zeg	

== Awards and nominations ==
List of awards and nominations for James Patrick Stuart
Year	Award	Category	Work	Result	Ref.
1992	Daytime Emmy Award	Outstanding Younger Actor in a Drama Series	All My Children	Nominated	
2012	Behind Voice Acting Awards	Best Vocal Ensemble in a Television Series - Comedy/Musical (shared with Tom McGrath, Jeff Bennett, Danny Jacobs, John DiMaggio; Kevin Michael Richardson, Andy Richter, Conrad Vernon, Nicole Sullivan, and Mary Scheer)	The Penguins of Madagascar	Nominated	
2013	Annie Awards	Voice Acting in an Animated Television/Broadcast Production (Episode: "High Moltage")	The Penguins of Madagascar	Nominated	
2013	Behind Voice Acting Awards	Best Male Vocal Performance in a Television Series in a Supporting Role - Comedy/Musical	Monsters vs. Aliens	Nominated	
2015	Eugene International Film Festival	Best Film	The American Gandhi	Won	
2020	Daytime Emmy Award	Outstanding Supporting Actor in a Drama Series	General Hospital	Nominated	
2021	Daytime Emmy Award	Outstanding Supporting Actor in a Drama Series	General Hospital	Nominated	
2022	Daytime Emmy Award	Outstanding Supporting Actor in a Drama Series	General Hospital	Nominated	
