= Lycanthropia (Grimm) =

- Grimm episode
- Episode no.: Season 5 Episode 14
- Directed by: Lee Rose
- Written by: Jeff Miller
- Cinematography by: Eliot Rockett
- Editing by: George Pilkinton
- Production code: 514
- Original air date: March 25, 2016
- Running time: 42 minutes

Guest appearances
- Ann Cusack as Eliza Baske; Matt Angel as Doyle Baske; Anne Leighton as Rachel Wood

Episode chronology
← Previous "Silence of the Slams"	Next → "Skin Deep"
- Grimm season 5

"Lycanthropia" is the 14th episode of season 5 of the supernatural drama television series Grimm and the 102nd episode overall, which premiered on March 25, 2016, on the cable network NBC. The episode was written by Jeff Miller and was directed by Lee Rose. In the episode, Nick, Hank and Wu investigate a murder that seems to be committed by a Wesen that may resemble a Blutbad. They soon discover they are dealing with a disease named Lycanthropia that can make the Blutbaden beasts on a full moon. However, Wu is soon affected by this.

The episode received positive reviews from critics, who praised Wu's character development.

== Plot ==
Opening quote: "The world is full of obvious things which nobody by chance ever observes."

On the first night of the full moon, a young successful entrepreneur is driving on a deserted woodland road to go and visit his mother. His tire blows out and causes him to lose complete control of his car, and the car ends up ramming into a tree. He abandons his car and notices the sun is setting and he begins to run the last three miles. The next day, Nick (David Giuntoli) and Hank (Russell Hornsby), respond to a call about an injured man up on the road. As soon as they meet the man, Nick and Hank sense something is wrong, so they decide to get help from Monroe (Silas Weir Mitchell) (and his extraordinary Blutbad sense of smell). Upon returning to the scene with Monroe, they find two hikers who have been brutally attacked by what looks like a Blutbad. In the course of their investigation, Monroe and Rosalee (Bree Turner) mention a disease, Lycanthropia, that turns a Blutbad into an uncontrollable beast every full moon.

Nick, Hank and Wu (Reggie Lee) suspect the young entrepreneur had something to do with it, and hold him at the station to see whether he woges or not. But it quickly becomes clear, however, that the Lycanthrope happens to be his mother, not him. They race up to her house and confront her, and try to sedate her in her Wesen form. She is accidentally killed, but not before she scratches Wu on his left leg. Meanwhile, Adalind (Claire Coffee) is offered an opportunity to reunite with her daughter, Diana. Eve (Bitsie Tulloch) discovers that Black Claw is actively trying to recruit Renard (Sasha Roiz).

== Reception ==
=== Viewers ===
The episode was viewed by 4.32 million people, earning a 0.9/4 in the 18-49 rating demographics on the Nielson ratings scale, ranking third on its timeslot and sixth for the night in the 18-49 demographics, behind a rerun of Shark Tank, 20/20, Dateline NBC, and an NCAA game. This was a 2% increase in viewership from the previous episode, which was watched by 4.20 million viewers with a 1.0/4. This means that 0.9 percent of all households with televisions watched the episode, while 4 percent of all households watching television at that time watched it. With DVR factoring in, the episode was watched by 6.61 million viewers and had a 1.7 ratings share in the 18-49 demographics.

=== Critical reviews ===
"Lycanthropia" received positive reviews. Les Chappell from The A.V. Club gave the episode a "B+" rating and wrote, "'Lycanthropia' takes one of the series' biggest leaps into that category as Grimm tells its first proper werewolf story, beginning and ending with loud howls in the light of the full moon. Yet going past that point it's an episode that's refreshingly light on the other cliches, opting to take elements of that framework and tell a standard Grimm story. And in the process, it also finds a way to introduce yet another complication to Team Grimm's life, one with potential for big dividends in future episodes."

Kathleen Wiedel from TV Fanatic, gave a 3.5 star rating out of 5, stating: "After teasing the Keys and the lost-for-centuries mysterious treasure for four and a half seasons, Grimm decided to... hide the treasure behind some bricks. Yep. Instead of, you know, following up on this MASSIVE story arc. Grimm Season 5 Episode 14 was mostly Case of the Week, with a good dose of fault lines being caused because Renard doesn't talk to people, apparently."

Lindi Smith from EW wrote, "Is Wu about to become a wesen, or do you think they will find a cure? Do we even want to see Wu as a wesen when he's one of the few humans on the show?"

MaryAnn Sleasman from TV.com, wrote, "'Lycanthropia' tried, and didn't exactly fail, at rebuilding some of that complexity that this latest season has been missing. It just wasn't particularly great. Not every episode of every series needs to be great, mind you, but Grimm hasn't had anything truly wonderful in some time and I'm ready for it to happen. I've been ready. Anytime now, Grimm. Any. Time."

Christine Horton of Den of Geek wrote, "It was a bit of a mixed bag from the Grimm team this week, with a new case to solve, some ongoing storylines bubbling away in the background and a potentially interesting new development for one of our favourite characters."
