= I Don't Want to Lose You =

I Don't Want to Lose You may refer to:

- "Don't Wanna Lose You", a song by Gloria Estefan
- "I Don't Wanna Lose You", a song by Tina Turner
- "I Don't Want to Lose You", a song by The Spinners from Pick of the Litter (The Spinners album)
- "I Don't Want to Lose You", a song by REO Speedwagon from their 1988 album The Hits
- I Don't Want to Lose You Baby, an album by Chad and Jeremy
