= Before and After (Chad & Jeremy song) =

Single by Chad & Jeremy

from the album Before and After
- B-side: "Fare Thee Well (I Must Be Gone)"
- Released: 1965
- Recorded: 1965
- Genre: Pop
- Length: 2:37
- Label: Columbia
- Songwriter(s): Van McCoy
- Producer(s): Lor Crane

Chad & Jeremy singles chronology
"What Do You Want With Me" (1965)	"Before and After" (1965)	"From a Window" (1965)

"Before and After" is a 1965 hit single by Chad & Jeremy. It was the duo's label debut on Columbia Records, released after Columbia acquired rights to all of the duo's post-January 1, 1965 recordings. The song was written by Van McCoy, then a staff writer for Columbia's publishing arm April Blackwood Music. Artie Wayne, professional manager of April Blackwood, placed "Before and After" with Chad & Jeremy, who recorded the song in March 1965 in the sessions for their album also entitled Before and After; Lor Crane produced these sessions at Columbia's New York City studios.

The song borrows the concept of "before and after" images popular in advertising campaigns for weight loss products: the song's narrator compares his image with that of the current beau of his ex-girlfriend: "He wears a smile, I wear a frown...See the difference between the old and new/ Before and after losing you."

"Before and After" rose to a Billboard Hot 100 peak of No. 17 in June 1965. Its chart impact was muted by the concurrent release of other Chad & Jeremy singles by the duo's previous label World Artists (specifically "What Do You Want With Me" and "From a Window"). "Before and After" was Chad & Jeremy's fourth – and final – Top 20 hit. On Canada's CHUM Charts the song reached No. 31.

An earlier recording of the song had been made by the Fleetwoods for their January 1965 album Before and After; the title track was stylized as "Before and After (Losing You)" and released as an unsuccessful single release that February. "Before and After" has also been recorded by the American Breed, Lesley Gore, and by writer Van McCoy himself on his 1978 album My Favorite Fantasy.
