= Groovy (album) =

Studio album by Red Garland Trio
- Released: Mid December 1957
- Recorded: December 14, 1956 (#4–5); May 24, 1957 (#6); August 9, 1957 (#1–3)
- Studio: Van Gelder Studio, Hackensack, NJ
- Genre: Jazz
- Length: 40:20
- Label: Prestige; PRLP 7113
- Producer: Bob Weinstock

Red Garland Trio chronology
The P.C. Blues (1957)	Groovy (1957)	John Coltrane with the Red Garland Trio (1957)

Groovy is an album by jazz pianist Red Garland and his trio, released in 1957 on Prestige Records.

== Reception ==
Professional ratings
Review scores
Source	Rating
AllMusic	4.5/5 stars
Down Beat	5/5 stars
The Penguin Guide to Jazz Recordings	3/4 stars

In his review on AllMusic, Michael G. Nastos states: "Red Garland's third recording as a leader has him playing very well, somewhat energetic and more inclusive in his direction to span the mainstream jazz palate beyond the cool exterior he emanates. The title might be a bit deceptive, for this is not a project where soul-jazz or early boogaloo influences turned jazzmen into groovemeisters -- it's a swinging groove. ... It is said that by the third recording, most musicians should have their style down pat and begin attempting to take the music to a higher level. You really hear that in this recording, which was a springboard to making Red Garland one of the most revered and respected jazz pianists of the modern era."

== Track listing ==
1. "C-Jam Blues" (Barney Bigard, Duke Ellington) – 8:21
2. "Gone Again" (Curtis Lewis, Curley Hamner, Gladys Hampton) – 6:46
3. "Will You Still Be Mine?" (Matt Dennis, Tom Adair) – 4:43
4. "Willow Weep for Me" (Ann Ronell) – 9:35
5. "What Can I Say After I Say I'm Sorry" (Walter Donaldson, Abe Lyman) – 7:14
6. "Hey Now" (Red Garland) – 3:41

== Personnel ==
- Red Garland – piano
- Paul Chambers – bass
- Art Taylor – drums
