= Before and After (Chad & Jeremy album) =

Studio album by Chad & Jeremy
- Released: 24 May 1965
- Recorded: 1965
- Studio: Columbia Studios New York
- Genre: Baroque pop
- Length: 27:30
- Label: Columbia
- Producer: Lor Crane

Chad & Jeremy chronology
Sing For You (1965)	Before and After (1965)	I Don't Want to Lose You Baby (1965)

Singles from Before and After
- 1. "Before and After" / "Fare Thee Well (I Must Be Gone)" Released: 1965

Professional ratings
Review scores
Source	Rating
AllMusic	2.5/5 stars

Before and After is the third studio album by English duo Chad & Jeremy, released on 24 May 1965. It was the first record the duo released for Columbia Records. This album includes many sunshine pop, baroque pop and folk rock-styled songs by the duo, including their final top 20 hit, "Before and After".

== Recording ==
According to Chad Stuart, the recording had been marked with difficulties with producer Lor Crane: "I remember feeling frustrated because I wanted to arrange everything. Our producer, Lor Crane, ran a pretty tight ship, and he wasn't about to let that happen. To be fair, our touring commitments made it difficult anyway, so we surrendered to the system and went along for the ride."

"Say It Isn't True" was originally written for Freddie and the Dreamers, and was included on their album You Were Mad for Me. Chad Stuart remarked that he liked performing "Tell Me Baby", and Jeremy Clyde enjoyed performing "Evil-Hearted Me".

== Chart performance ==
The album debuted on Billboard magazine's Top LP's chart in the issue dated June 26, 1965, peaking at No. 37 during an eighteen-week run on the chart.

== Reception ==
In a tepid review for AllMusic, Richie Unterberger comments that, despite having a variety of styles, the album ranges from simply being "modestly enjoyable to mediocre". He also notes the lack of astounding extras included on the expanded 2002 CD reissue.

== Track listing ==
Track listing adapted from LP liner notes.

Side one
No.	Title	Writer(s)	Length
1.	"Before and After"	Van McCoy	2:37
2.	"Why Should I Care"	Jeremy Clyde, Chad Stuart	2:43
3.	"For Lovin' Me"	Gordon Lightfoot	2:13
4.	"I'm In Love Again"	Clyde, Stuart	2:33
5.	"Little Does She Know"	Russell Alquist, Stuart	2:52
6.	"Tell Me Baby"	Clyde, Stuart	3:12

Side two
No.	Title	Writer(s)	Length
1.	"What do You Want With Me"	Clyde, Stuart	2:53
2.	"Say It Isn't True"	Stuart	1:58
3.	"Fare Thee Well (I Must Be Gone)"	Traditional	2:08
4.	"Evil-Hearted Me"	Josh White	2:11
5.	"Can't Get Used to Losing You"	Doc Pomus, Mort Shuman	1:59
Total length:			27:30

2002 CD reissue bonus tracks
No.	Title	Length
12.	"Pennies"
13.	"Don't Get Around Much Anymore"
14.	"Sometimes"
15.	"Fare Thee Well"
16.	"Adesso Si"
17.	"Nessuno Piu Di Me"
18.	"What Do You Want With Me (alternate version)"
19.	"Evil-Hearted Me (alternate version)"
20.	"Before and After (alternate version)"
21.	"The Cruel War"
22.	"I Can't Talk To You"

== Charts ==
Chart (1965)	Peak position
US Billboard Top LPs	37
