= I Have Dreamed (song) =

1951 show tune by Rodgers & Hammerstein

Song
- Published: 1951
- Composer: Richard Rodgers
- Lyricist: Oscar Hammerstein II

"I Have Dreamed"

Single by Chad & Jeremy

from the album I Don't Want to Lose You Baby
- B-side: "Should I"
- Released: 22 September 1965
- Recorded: 1 February–24 June 1965
- Genre: Folk rock; soft rock
- Length: 2:11
- Label: Columbia
- Composer: Richard Rodgers
- Lyricist: Oscar Hammerstein II
- Producer: Lor Crane

Chad & Jeremy singles chronology
"September in the Rain" (1965)	"I Have Dreamed" (1965)	"Teenage Failure" (1966)

"I Have Dreamed"

Single by The Lettermen

from the album I Have Dreamed
- B-side: "The Pendulum Swings Both Ways"
- Released: 1969
- Length: 2:53
- Label: Capitol
- Composer: Richard Rodgers
- Lyricist: Oscar Hammerstein II

The Lettermen singles chronology
"Put Your Head on My Shoulder" (1968)	"I Have Dreamed" (1969)	"Hurt So Bad" (1969)

"I Have Dreamed" is a show tune from the 1951 Rodgers and Hammerstein musical, The King and I. In the original Broadway production it was sung by Doretta Morrow and Larry Douglas. It has since become a standard, with many artists recording the song.

== Background ==
In the show, the characters of Lun Tha and Tuptim sing of how they have dreamt of their true love blossoming in freedom, as they prepare to escape from the King's palace. This is in contrast to the subdued mood of the song "We Kiss in a Shadow", when they fear that the King will learn of their love.

"I Have Dreamed" was added to the score of The King and I during its out-of-town tryout run. The song was recorded for the soundtrack of the 1956 film version of The King and I, but, ultimately, no footage was shot to feature it. Only the melody is heard in the film, as incidental music prior to the "We Kiss in a Shadow" sequence. However, "I Have Dreamed" was retained on the soundtrack album where it was sung by Reuben Fuentes and Leona Gordon.

== Controversy ==
The tune has been accused of similarities to Alfred Newman's track, "The Hill of the Brilliant Green Jade", from the 1944 film The Keys of the Kingdom starring Gregory Peck, though only seven notes are the same.

== Recorded versions ==
- Ronnie Aldrich
- Thomas Allen
- Julie Andrews (1994) - Broadway: The Music of Richard Rodgers
- June Angela and Martin Vidnovic for the 1977 Broadway revival recording of The King and I
- Jane Ira Bloom (2005) - Like Silver, Like Song
- Boston Pops Orchestra
- Peabo Bryson with Lea Salonga (1992) for the 1992 Hollywood Bowl studio cast recording of The King and I
- David Burnham with Tracy Venner Warren (1999) for the 1999 Richard Rich studio animation of The King and I
- Chad & Jeremy had a (Billboard Hot 100 hit in 1965, where it peaked at #91, and #22 on the Easy Listening chart; Billboard said of it that "the Rodgers-Hammerstein tune is beautifully revived with this smooth vocal with strong dance beat backing.")
- Donna Cruz
- Bill Cunliffe
- Bobby Darin
- Sammy Davis Jr.
- Doris Day (Richard Rodgers identified hers as the most beautiful rendition he had ever heard)
- Trudy Desmond
- Kurt Elling
- Connie Evingson
- Sergio Franchi covered this song on his 1964 RCA Victor album The Exciting Voice of Sergio Franchi
- Connie Francis
- David Friesen
- Wilbur Harden
- Fred Hersch
- Lena Horne
- Betty Johnson
- Dick Johnson
- Tom Jones
- Lainie Kazan recorded for her 1967 album The Love Album on MGM Records
- Andre Kostelanetz
- Nancy Lamott
- Julius LaRosa
- The Lettermen
- Keith Lockhart
- London Philharmonic Orchestra
- Jason Manford on his 2017 album A Different Stage
- Mantovani
- Johnny Mathis
- Howard McGillin
- Dave McKenna
- Helen Merrill
- Glenn Miller Orchestra
- Patina Miller
- Matt Monro
- Doretta Morrow with Larry Douglas for the original Broadway cast recording
- Patrice Munsel
- Kelli O'Hara
- Greg Phillinganes
- Herb Pomeroy
- Royal Philharmonic Orchestra
- "Little" Jimmy Scott (recorded 1972)
- Jeanette Scovotti
- Doc Severinsen
- Marc Shaiman - arranged for the film The American President
- Cybill Shepherd
- David Silverman
- Kaz Simmons – Take Me Home (2005)
- Frank Sinatra - The Concert Sinatra (1963)
- Barbra Streisand- recorded in 1985 as part of a King and I medley that incorporates elements of “We Kiss In a Shadow” and concludes with “Something Wonderful.”
- Bryn Terfel (1996) - Something Wonderful: Bryn Terfel sings Rodgers and Hammerstein
- Scott Walker
- Gerald Wiggins
- Andy Williams
- Matthew Morrison and Laura Michelle Kelly
