= Distant Shores (album) =

Studio album by Chad & Jeremy
- Released: 15 August 1966 (UK)
- Recorded: November 1965 (London), March 1966 (Hollywood)
- Genres: Folk; baroque pop; sunshine pop
- Length: 30:31
- Label: Columbia Records
- Producers: Larry Marks (Hollywood, California), Lor Crane (London, England)

Chad & Jeremy chronology
I Don't Want to Lose You Baby (1965)	Distant Shores (1966)	Of Cabbages and Kings (1967)

Singles from Distant Shores
- 1. "Distant Shores" / "Last Night" Released: 9 July 1966; 2. "You Are She" / "I Won't Cry" Released: 1966

Distant Shores is the fifth studio album by the English duo Chad & Jeremy. It was released on 15 August 1966. Distant Shores was recorded between November 1965 and March 1966. This is the first album in which the duo were given time to craft their sound and style. This album is a precursor to their psychedelic album, Of Cabbages and Kings. It includes the first recording of Paul Simon's "Homeward Bound", predating Simon & Garfunkel's recording of the song.

== Charts ==
The album debuted on Billboard magazine's Top LP's chart in the issue dated September 24, 1966, peaking at No. 61 during a fourteen-week run on the chart.

The title track was composed by the duo's young bassist, James William Guercio, who went on to his own significant career in the music industry. "Distant Shores" was released as a single in the U.S. and rose to No. 30 in the Billboard Hot 100 in August 1966. A second single, "You Are She", topped out at No. 87.

== Recording ==
"Distant Shores was a milestone in Chad & Jeremy history because the title track (and two others) were recorded on the West Coast. This was an important development because we were finally able to track our recordings (build them layer by layer) and work with a producer with whom we had a strong rapport, namely Larry Marks, a fellow songwriter and creative spirit," Chad Stuart recalls.

== Track listing ==
1. "Distant Shores" (James William Guercio) – 2:44
2. "Ain't It Nice" (Jimmy Smith) – 3:07
3. "When Your Love Has Gone" (Bobby Goldsboro) – 2:38
4. "Homeward Bound" (Paul Simon) – 2:33
5. "The Way You Look Tonight" (Dorothy Fields, Jerome Kern) – 2:33
6. "Morning" (Jeremy Clyde, Chad Stuart) – 2:49
7. "You Are She" (J. Clyde, C. Stuart) – 2:36
8. "Everyone's Gone to the Moon" (Jonathan King)– 2:29
9. "I Won't Cry" (J. Guercio) – 2:05
10. "Early Morning Rain" (Gordon Lightfoot) - 3:41
11. "Don't Make Me Do It" (J. Clyde, C. Stuart) – 2:39
