= The P.C. Blues =

Studio album by Red Garland
- Released: 1970
- Recorded: May 11, 1956; March 22, 1957; August 9, 1957
- Studio: Van Gelder Studio, Hackensack, New Jersey
- Genre: Jazz
- Length: 42:57
- Label: Prestige; PRLP 7752
- Producer: Bob Weinstock

Red Garland chronology
Sugan (1957)	The P.C. Blues (1970)	Groovy (1956-57)

The P.C. Blues is an album by pianist Red Garland featuring tracks recorded in 1957 at the sessions that produced Red Garland's Piano and Groovy (with one track from Miles Davis' 1956 album Workin' with The Miles Davis Quintet added) which were first released on the Prestige label until 1970.

== Reception ==
Professional ratings
Review scores
Source	Rating
Allmusic	4/5 stars
The Penguin Guide to Jazz Recordings	3/4 stars

In his review for Allmusic, Scott Yanow called it a "thoughtful but swinging release".

== Track listing ==
1. "Ahmad's Blues" (Ahmad Jamal) - 7:29
2. "Lost April" (Eddie DeLange, Emil Newman, Hubert Spencer) - 6:26
3. "Why Was I Born?" (Oscar Hammerstein II, Jerome Kern) - 5:49
4. "Tweedle Dee Dee" (Winfield Scott) - 13:18
5. "The P.C. Blues" (Red Garland) - 9:53
- Recorded at Van Gelder Studio on May 11, 1956 (track 1), March 22, 1957 (track 3) and August 9, 1957 (tracks 2, 4 & 5)

== Personnel ==
- Red Garland - piano
- Paul Chambers - bass
- Philly Joe Jones (track 1) Art Taylor (tracks 2–5) - drums
