= A Taste of Romance =

- Written by: Evan Laughlin; Jennifer Notas Shapiro
- Directed by: Lee Rose
- Starring: Teri Polo; James Patrick Stuart
- Music by: Nathan Furst
- Country of origin: United States
- Original language: English

Production
- Executive producers: Larry Levinson; Amanda Phillips Atkins; Randy Pope
- Producer: Lincoln Lageson
- Cinematography: Maximo Munzi
- Editor: Jennifer Jean Cacavas

Original release
- Network: Hallmark Channel
- Release: January 14, 2012

A Taste of Romance is a 2012 Hallmark Channel original movie directed by Lee Rose from a screenplay by Jennifer Notas.

== Plot ==
Uptight French chef Sara Westbrook (Teri Polo) gets fired up when her upscale café, Chez Varenne, is suddenly overshadowed by a new restaurant moving in next door run by a group of rowdy firemen. Led by handsome former fire fighter Gill Callahan (James Patrick Stuart) and his friend Danny (Rockmond Dunbar), The Five Alarm Grill is soon a big success while Sara and Patsy (Romy Rosemont), her pastry chef, struggle to bring in customers.

Sara suddenly softens when she meets Gill's ten-year-old daughter Hannah (Bailee Madison) who she can't help but take under her wing when she learns Hannah is growing up without a mom. Ignoring the obvious tension between her dad and Sara, Hannah is soon playing matchmaker. As Gill and Sara slowly begin to stir up romance, their relationship is tested once again when a local food critic gets in the mix. Can the couple resist the temptation to compete with each other, or will the heat of competition drive them apart?

== Cast ==
- Teri Polo as Sara Westbrook
- James Patrick Stuart as Gill Callahan
- Alexander Bedria as Officer Ramirez
- Jack Conley as Chief
- Ashley Cusato as Jane
- Rockmond Dunbar as Danny Marsh
- Peggy Dunne as Customer #2
- Dana Foist as Customer #4
- Bailee Madison as Hannah Callahan
- Mercy Malick as News Producer
- Simone Missick as Elise (credited as Simone Cook)
- Jonathan Nail as Customer #1
- Veronica Parks as Hot Date
- Amy Cale Peterson as Customer #3
- Derek Ray as Michael
- Romy Rosemont as Patsy Danvers
- Erica Shaffer as Nora Smithson

== Reception ==
A Taste of Romance was the #1 movie of the week among its key demographic, women aged 23–54, as well as the #1 household rated ad-supported cable movie of the week.

Critic Francine Brokaw described A Taste of Romance as "a sweet tale of love (pun intended)" with "interesting characters and a cute plot". She had particular praise for the performance of young Bailee Madison.

The Dove Foundation in its review of the film said, "We are proud to award the film the Dove “Family-Approved” Seal for all ages."
