= Teddi Schwartz =

American folk singer (1914–2017)

Teddi Schwartz in around 1970

Theodora "Teddi" Schwartz (4 July 1914 – 13 October 2017, Yiddish: טעדי שװאַרץ), occasionally spelled Teddy, was an American Yiddish-language singer, writer and translator. She is mainly remembered today for her singable English translation of Dona, Dona which she cowrote with Arthur Kevess.

== Biography ==
She was born Theodora Rothfarb on July 14, 1914 in East Harlem to Yiddish-speaking Russian Jewish immigrant parents. Her mother was called Anna; her father Mendl "Max" Rothfarb was a Klezmer cornet player and tailor, and her grandfather was also a musician who taught music to the family. She studied in public schools and then at the Manhattan School of Music. In 1937 she married a lawyer named Harry Schwartz.

She was influenced by the folk music revival of the 1930s and 1940s and in particular the work of Alan Lomax and Pete Seeger She started to translate American songs into Yiddish, collaborating with Arthur Kevess, who often translated Yiddish and German songs. Schwartz and Kevess published a book of singable translated Yiddish songs in 1956, which included the Aaron Zeitlin and Sholom Secunda's Yiddish song Dona, Dona. It was republished in the magazine Jewish Currents in 1958 along with their English versions of Tumbalalaika and The Partisan Girl. That version was recorded by Joan Baez in 1960, as well as by Donovan and Mary Hopkin. Its popularity spurred further translations into a number of other languages.

During this period Schwartz performed regularly in concerts, on radio and television, at the 1964 New York World's Fair. She also led choral groups and taught music in camp settings and at the Guild for the Jewish Blind. In 1970 Schwartz released an LP Walk Right In/Kimt arayn on her own label, Tevye Records. In 1981 and 1982 she joined the Yiddisher Caravan tours, a national touring variety show of klezmer, Yiddish theater, cantorial music and folk songs funded by the National Council for the Traditional Arts. She also attended KlezKamp in New York in its early years.

Schwartz died on October 13, 2017 at age 103. She was buried in the New Montefiore Cemetery in West Babylon, New York.

== Selected works ==
- Tumbalalaika: a collection of 17 Jewish songs, including Dona dona dona: for singing in English or the original in transliteration (booklet)
- Songs my Grandma Taught me: singable English versions of Yiddish folksongs (booklet, 1961).
- Walk Right In/Kumt arayn (LP, Tevye Records, 1970).
- Kumt arayn "Walk Right In" (audiocassette, Global Village records)
