= C4 (French band) =

French electronic music band

C4 was a French Electronic Euro Disco boyband consisting of four members Arnaud, Christophe, Pierre and Gaël. The band was originally formed in 1998 as a tribute to popular French singer Claude François (Cloclo). The band C4 released their album En Plein Coeur in 1998 being Euro dance versions of renowned Cloclo songs including his French version of "Donna Donna". François co-written the French lyrics to the song and had a number 1 hit with it in December 1964. C4's new dance version charted yet again in France appearing in the official French Singles Chart for 12 weeks and peaking at number 25. The follow-up C4 single was yet another François song "J'attendrai", a French version of "Reach Out I'll Be There".

The band was formed upon an initiative of François' wife who had announced interest in soliciting a number of young candidates who loved his work in a bid to form a band to reinterpret his songs with the 20th anniversary of Claude François' death that occurred in 1978 fast approaching.

== Discography ==
=== Albums ===
- 1998: En Plein Coeur

Track list:

1. "Donna Donna"
2. "Stop au nom de l'amour
3. "C'est la même chanson"
4. "J'attendrai"
5. "J'y pense et puis j'oublie"
6. "Belles! Belles! Belles!"
7. "Je vais à Rio"
8. "Chanson populaire"
9. "Ça va marcher (Toi et moi)"
10. "Mon meilleur ami (My Best Friend)

=== Singles ===
Year	Album	Peak positions	album
Year	Album	FRA	album
1998	"Donna, Donna"	25	En Plein Coeur
1998	"J'attendrai"	–	En Plein Coeur
