= @Home =

@Home or @home may refer to:

- @Home Network, a defunct cable broadband provider
- @home (retailer), chain of Indian retail stores owned by Nilkamal Limited
- Suffix for volunteer distributed computing projects generally using BOINC

== See also ==
- At Home (disambiguation)
