= Chad & Jeremy Sing for You =

Sing for You

Studio album by Chad & Jeremy
- Released: January 1965
- Genre: Folk; baroque pop
- Label: World Artists Records
- Producer: Jimmie Haskell

Chad & Jeremy chronology
Yesterday's Gone (1964)	Sing for You (1965)	Before and After (1965)

Singles from Chad & Jeremy Sing for You
- 1. "If I Loved You" (not included on album) / "Donna, Donna" Released: 1965; 2. "What Do You Want With Me" / "It Was a Very Good Year" Released: 1965; 3. "From a Window" / "My Coloring Book" Released: 1965

Professional ratings
Review scores
Source	Rating
Record Mirror	3/5 stars

Chad & Jeremy Sing for You is the second studio album by the English duo Chad & Jeremy. It was released in the United States in January 1965, and it was their last album to be released under World Artists. It is not to be confused with the British release of the same name, which contains different tracks. Another take on "What Do You Want With Me" was released on their next album, Before and After.

The album was re-released in its entirety, along with various alternate takes and demos, as part of the 2-disc set, Yesterday's Gone: The Complete Ember & World Artists Recordings (2016).

== Chart performance ==
The album debuted on Billboard magazine's Top LP's chart in the issue dated March 27, 1965, peaking at No. 69 during a fourteen-week run on the chart.

== Track listing ==
1. "My Coloring Book" (Fred Ebb, John Kander) – 2:26
2. "What Do You Want With Me" (Chad Stuart, Jeremy Clyde) – 2:05
3. "From a Window" (John Lennon, Paul McCartney) – 2:06
4. "If You've Got a Heart" (Bobby Goldsboro) – 2:47
5. "No Other Baby" (Chad Stuart, Jeremy Clyde) – 2:35
6. "Donna, Donna" (Aaron Zeitlin, Sholom Secunda) – 2:58
7. "The Girl from Ipanema" (Antônio Carlos Jobim, Vinicius de Moraes, Norman Gimbel) – 2:01
8. "Four Strong Winds" (Ian Tyson)– 2:39
9. "Only Those in Love" (Russell Alquist, Chad Stuart) - 2:13
10. "You Know What" – 2:05
11. "Sleep Little Boy" (Russell Alquist) - 2:26
12. "My How the Time Goes By" (Russell Alquist, Chad Stuart) - 2:03

== Charts ==
Chart (1965)	Peak position
US Billboard Top LPs	69
