= Dona, Dona =

Yiddish song

"Dana Dana (Yiddish original)"

Song
- Language: Yiddish
- Published: 1941
- Songwriters: Sholom Secunda, Aaron Zeitlin

"Dona, Dona (English version)"

Song
- Language: English
- Published: mid-1950s
- Genre: Folk music
- Songwriters: Sholom Secunda, Aaron Zeitlin. English lyrics by Arthur Kevess and Teddi Schwartz

"Dona, Dona", popularly known as "Donna, Donna", is a song about a calf being led to slaughter, written by Sholom Secunda and Aaron Zeitlin. Originally a Yiddish language song "Dana Dana" (in Yiddish דאַנאַ דאַנאַ), also known as "Dos Kelbl" (in Yiddish דאָס קעלבל, "The Calf"), it was a song used in a Yiddish play produced by Zeitlin.

== History ==
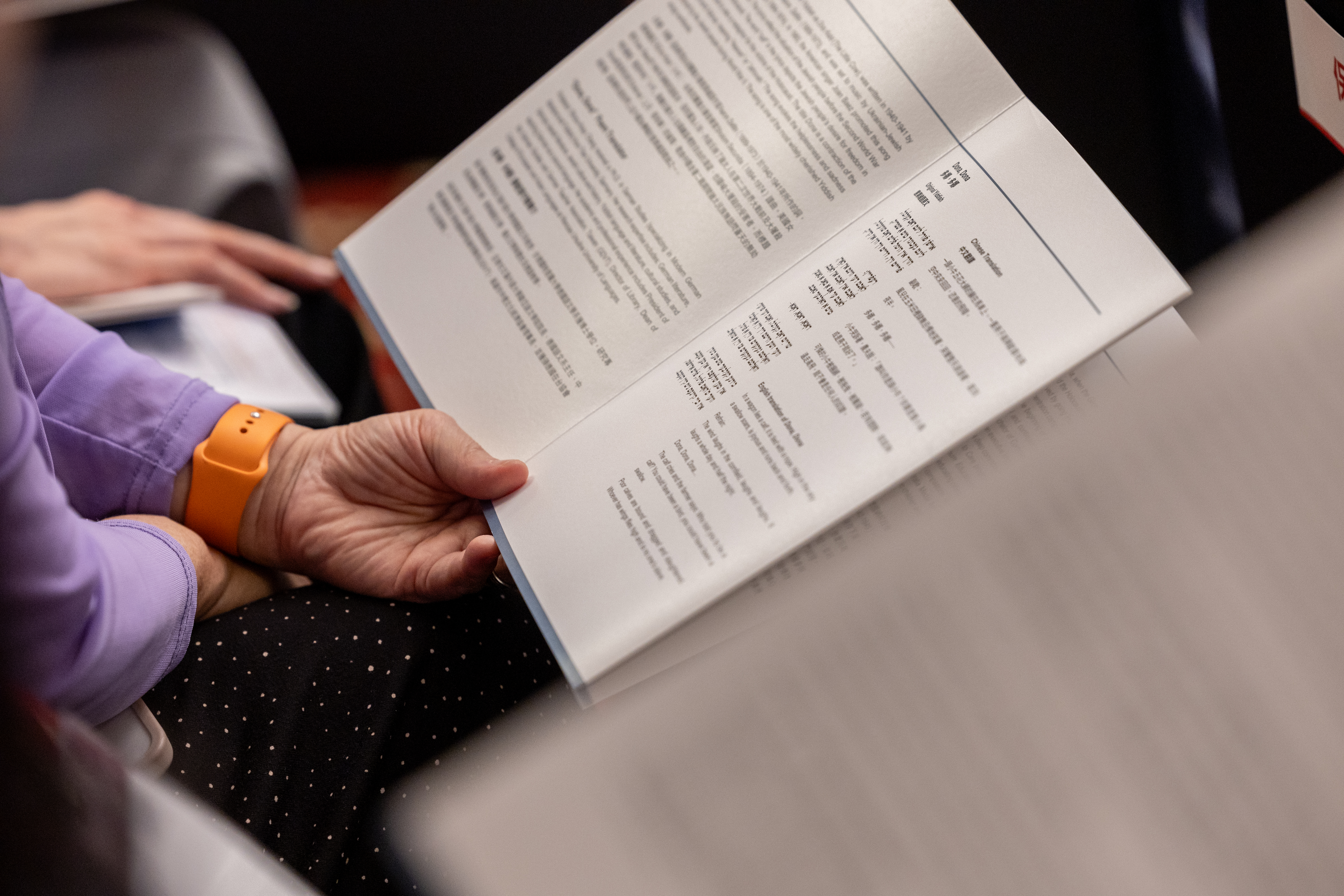
Printed lyrics of "Dona, Dona" in Yiddish, Chinese and English

"Dana Dana" was written for the Aaron Zeitlin stage production Esterke (1940–41) with music composed by Sholom Secunda. The lyrics, score, parts, and associated material are available online in the Yiddish Theater Digital Archives. The lyric sheet is in typewritten Yiddish and handwritten Yiddish lyrics also appear in the piano score. The text underlay in the score and parts is otherwise romanized in a phonetic transcription that appears oriented toward stage German. The YIVO standardized transliteration system was not then in widespread use, and many Yiddish transliterations looked like German, to which the Yiddish language is closely related.

The orchestra plays the "Dana Dana" melody at several points in Esterke. The original is 2/4, in G minor for a duo of a man and a woman, choral with the orchestral accompaniment. Secunda wrote "Dana-" for the orchestral score and "Dana Dana" for the vocal scores. The Yiddish text was written with Roman alphabet. He wrote for the choral score andantino (somewhat slowly) and sempre staccato (play staccato always). The melody of the introduction was also used at the end of the song. He wrote piu mosso (more rapidly) for the refrain and some passages that emphasize the winds. First, a woman (Secunda wrote "she") sings four bars, and then the man (Secunda wrote "he") sings the next four. They sing together from the refrain. Although singing the third part of "Dana Dana" (= "Dana Dana Dana Dana ..."), the man sometimes sings lower than the melody using disjunct motions. The melody is refrained. Then "he" sings the melody, and "she" sometimes sings "Dana", other times sings "Ah" with a high voice or technical passage. Secunda wrote molto rit (suddenly much more slowly) for the ending of the first verse. There are some differences between the original and the melody that are well known. Secunda wrote "ha ha ha" for the choral score with the broken chords.

There are various views as to the meaning of the words 'Dana, dana' in the original Yiddish version of the song, which are repeated sixteen times in each chorus. The words 'dana, dana' are a common refrain in Polish folk song, heard often in formulas such as 'Oj, dana dana, moja dana'. Some believe it to be a nonsense word, but it may have earlier ritual origins in Polish song or be imitative of musical instruments. Zeitlin, who spent most of his life in the Polish-speaking world before emigrating to the U.S. in 1939, may have taken the 'dana' refrain from this source. A comment appearing in the Hebrew newspaper Haaretz gives the meaning of Dana as the sound that was commonly made by the guide of a horse-drawn cart to encourage the horse to continue to step forward as it drags its load. According to the comment in Haaretz, the translation of the word Dana (from Yiddish to Hebrew) was provided by Kol Israel in 1962, when the song was performed by Nechama Hendel. In the John Camden Hotten Slang Dictionary, the word Dana related to a nightman's or dustman's cart in old German or Austrian slang. In Turkish, Azerbaijani and other Turkic languages, "dana" means a "weaned calf".

== Lyrics ==
Yiddish original	Transliteration	Translation by Shalom Secunda	Translation by Kevess & Schwartz	Literal English translation
אױפֿן פֿורל ליגט דאָס קעלבל, ליגט געבונדן מיט אַ שטריק. הױך אין הימל פֿליט דאָס שװעלבל, פֿרייט זיך, דרייט זיך הין און צוריק.	Oyfn furl ligt dos kelbl, ligt gebundn mit a shtrik. Hoykh in himl flit dos shvelbl, freydt zikh, dreyt zikh hin un krik.	On a wagon bound and helpless Lies a calf, who is doomed to die. High above him flies a swallow Soaring gaily through the sky.	On a wagon bound for market There's a calf with a mournful eye. High above him there's a swallow Winging swiftly through the sky.	Upon the wagon lies the calf, Lies bound with a rope. High up in the skies there flies a swallow, Rejoicing, flying to and fro.
כאָר:	Chorus:	Chorus:	Chorus:	Chorus:
לאַכט דער ווינט אין קאָרן, לאַכט און לאַכט און לאַכט, לאַכט ער אָפּ אַ טאָג אַ גאַנצן מיט אַ האַלבע נאַכט. דאָנאַ, דאָנאַ, דאָנאַ...	Lakht der vint in korn, lakht un lakht un lakht, lakht er op a tog a gantsn mit a halber nakht.	The wind laughs in the cornfield Laughs with all his might Laughs and laughs the whole day through And half way through the night Dona, dona, dona...	How the winds are laughing They laugh with all their might Laugh and laugh the whole day through And half the summer's night. Dona, dona, dona...	The wind laughs in the corn, Laughs and laughs and laughs, Laughs up a whole day And half a night. Dona, dona, dona ...
שרייַט דאָס קעלבל, זאָגט דער פּױער: װער זשע הײסט דיר זײַן אַ קאַלב? װאָלסט געקענט דאָך זײַן אַ פֿױגל, װאָלסט געקענט דאָך זײַן אַ שװאַלב.	Shrayt dos kelbl, zogt der poyer: "Ver zhe heyst dikh zayn a kalb? Volst gekert tsu zayn a foygl Volst gekert tsu zayn a shvalb?"	Now the calf is softly crying "Tell me wind, why do you laugh?" Why can't I fly like the swallow Why did I have to be a calf,	"Stop complaining", said the farmer, "Who told you a calf to be? Why don't you have wings to fly away Like the swallow so proud and free?"	The calf shouts; the farmer says, "Who told you to be a calf? You could have been a bird, You could have been a swallow."
כאָר	Chorus	Chorus	Chorus	Chorus
בידנע קעלבער טוט מען בינדן און מען שלעפּט זײ און מען שעכט, װער ס'האָט פֿליגל, פֿליט אַרױפֿצו, איז בײַ קײנעם ניט קיין קנעכט.	Bidne kelber tut men bindn un men shlept zey un men shekht; ver s'hot fligl, flit aroyf tzu iz bay keynem nit keyn knekht.	Calves are born and soon are slaughtered With no hope of being saved. Only those with wing like swallow Will not ever be enslaved.	Calves are easily bound and slaughtered Never knowing the reason why. But whoever treasures freedom, Like the swallow has learned to fly.	People tie up wretched calves, Move them around, and slaughter them; Whoever has wings flies up, Not enslaved by anyone.
כאָר	Chorus	Chorus	Chorus	Chorus

== Versions ==
"Donna, Donna"

Single by Ola & the Janglers

from the album Patterns
- B-side: "Come and Stay with Me"
- Released: March 1966
- Recorded: 1966
- Genre: Folk; folk rock
- Length: 3:24
- Label: Gazell
- Songwriter: Sholom Secunda (credited)
- Producer: Gunnar Bergström

Ola & the Janglers singles chronology
"Love Was On Your Mind" (1966)	"Donna, Donna" (1966)	"La La La" (1966)

=== English covers ===
Joan Baez first popularized the English version of the song when she recorded it in 1960, retitled as "Donna Donna". This version remains popular, with over 10 millions streams on Spotify.

Swedish band Ola & the Janglers covered the song in 1966, having heard the version by Kevess and Schwartz. Unlike many artists that had previously covered "Donna, Donna", the Janglers were not known as folk artists and had previously only released rock songs and they slightly changed the arrangement of the song to fit the group. They added a harpsichord part played by keyboardist Johannes Olsson, and bass guitar by Åke Eldsäter. A harmony part by Ola Håkansson, Claes af Geijerstam and Eldsäter was added during the chorus. The group recorded the song and the B-side, "Come and Stay with Me", during a session in 1966, with their regular producer Gunnar Bergström.

Initially intended to mark the introduction of guitarist af Geijerstam, who had recently replaced Christer Idering, "Donna, Donna" was chosen as the A-side of the single. While the single sleeves with "Donna, Donna" as the A-side were being printed, Pye Records released Donovan's version of the song as a single in Sweden. Fearing that the two singles would compete, the record label, Gazell, decided to switch the running order, with "Come and Stay with Me" becoming the A-side on the 7-inch single. This meant that the sleeve and single had contrasting A-sides, which led to confusion with fans and radio stations.

"Come and Stay with Me" reached number 13 on Kvällstoppen and number three on Tio i Topp in April 1966. "Donna, Donna" was still asked about in record stores, which led to it gaining a chart position on Kvällstoppen. It entered on April 12, 1966, at number 19 and was last seen on April 19 at the same position, the same date that "Come and Stay with Me" entered the chart. This led to the Janglers having three singles simultaneously; "Love Was on Your Mind", "Donna, Donna" and "Come and Stay with Me".

Both sides of the single were among the first attempts by a Swedish rock band to release a song in a folk rock vein. It was included on their second studio album Patterns, released in June of that year and became a staple on most of their compilation albums, including Best Sounds (1969) and Ola & the Janglers, 1964–71!.

==== Charts ====
Chart (1966)	Peak position
Sweden (Kvällstoppen)	19

==== Other English covers ====
- Secunda translated "Dana Dana" into English language (changing the vocalization of 'dana' to 'dona'), but this version did not gain much attention.
- The lyrics were translated once again in the mid-1950s, this time by Arthur Kevess and Teddi Schwartz. This version became popular after being recorded in 1960 by Joan Baez for her debut album Joan Baez. On the album, the song is retitled "Donna, Donna", doubling the "n" while retaining the long "o" pronunciation. A staple for Baez, "Donna, Donna" was used throughout the civil rights protest movement of the 1960s.
- Scottish singer-songwriter Donovan recorded a popular cover of the Baez version in 1965. This track appeared on his album What's Bin Did and What's Bin Hid. The title was also "Donna, Donna", thus reinforcing the popular "Donna", rather than the original transliteration "Dona".
- In 1965 Dana Gillespie released the song as a single on Pye Records, produced by Jimmy Page.
- English duo Chad & Jeremy (Chad Stuart and Jeremy Clyde) covered Donna Donna on their January 1965 US album Sing for You on World Artists Records. It was the B-side to their single "If I Loved You", which reached number 23 on the Billboard Hot 100. It was also included on their 1966 US album More Chad & Jeremy on Capitol Records.

=== French covers ===
"Donna Donna"

Single by Claude François

from the album Donna Donna / Les choses de la maison
- B-side: "Du Pain et du beurre / Je sais / Les cloches sonnaient"
- Released: 1964–1965
- Recorded: 1964
- Genre: Folk music
- Length: 2:32
- Label: Philips
- Songwriters: French lyrics by Vline Buggy, Claude François

Claude François cover

In 1964, the song was recorded in French by French singer Claude François as "Donna, Donna" reaching the top of the French Singles Charts for two consecutive weeks in December 1964. François co-wrote the French lyrics with Vline Buggy. The song, also known by its longer title "Donna, Donna (Le Petit Garçon)", is a revamped version. It no longer describes a helpless calf being led to slaughter, as in the original Yiddish version, but the troubles of an aspiring young boy growing up and dreaming about his own future. In the last verse, in an autobiographical twist, Claude François alludes to himself by singing the verse as "ce petit garçon que j'étais" (this small boy that I was...).

Other French covers

- In 1998, the French boyband C4 released a French dance version as "Donna, Donna" on Polygram and had a minor hit on the French singles charts, reaching number 25 and staying for 12 weeks.

=== Other versions ===
- The song was recorded in Yiddish by Aviva Semadar for the German radio show Folklore Around the World on WDR, on 4 November 2002.
- "Dana Dana" has been translated from Yiddish into Hebrew as "Lama Dona" and interpreted by Rika Zaraï. Zaraï included a French oriental dance version in her album Hava.
- The song has been recorded in many other languages, including German, Swedish, Japanese, Russian, Italian, Catalan and Vietnamese. In Vietnamese, the title was "Tiếc thương" (Mourning) by the musician Tuấn Dũng (of Mây Trắng group) in the 1960s, and the lyrics were changed to expresses the mourning of a man whose lover died at a young age. In Trần Tiến's version (1990s), the lyrics were translated metaphorically from French and performed by a girl-band named Tam Ca Áo Trắng (Trio of Schoolgirls). A version in Japanese was included in episode 16 of the 1997 TV anime series Revolutionary Girl Utena.
