= Willow Weep for Me =

Original song written and composed by Ann Ronell

Song
- Published: 1932 by Irving Berlin Inc.
- Genre: Pop
- Songwriter: Ann Ronell

"Willow Weep for Me"

Single by Chad & Jeremy

from the album Yesterday's Gone
- B-side: "If She Was Mine"
- Released: November 1964
- Genre: Pop
- Length: 2:33
- Label: World Artists
- Songwriter: Ann Ronell

Chad & Jeremy singles chronology
"A Summer Song" (1964)	"Willow Weep for Me" (1964)	"If I Loved You" (1965)

"Willow Weep for Me" is a popular song composed in 1932 by Ann Ronell, who also wrote the lyrics. The song form is AABA, written in 4/4 time, although occasionally adapted for 3/4 waltz time.

One account of the inspiration for the song is that, during her time at Radcliffe College, Ronell "had been struck by the loveliness of the willow trees on campus, and this simple observation became the subject of an intricate song."

The song was rejected by publishers for several reasons. First, the song is dedicated to George Gershwin. A dedication to another writer was disapproved of at the time, so the first person presented with the song for publication, Saul Bornstein, passed it to Irving Berlin, who accepted it. Other reasons stated for its slow acceptance are that it was written by a woman and that its construction was unusually complex for a composition that was targeted at a commercial audience (i.e., radio broadcast, record sales and sheet music sales). An implied tempo change in the fifth bar, a result of a switch from the two eighth notes and an eighth-note triplet opening in each of the first four bars to just four eighth notes opening the fifth, then back to two eighth notes and an eighth-note triplet opening the sixth bar, which then has a more offset longer note than any of the previous bars, was one cause of Bornstein's concern.

== Versions ==
It is mostly known as a jazz standard, having been recorded first by Ted Fio Rito (with vocal by Muzzy Marcellino) in October 1932 and by Paul Whiteman (with vocal by Irene Taylor) the following month. Both were hits in December 1932. Notable recordings continued into the 1950s, starting with Stan Kenton's version with June Christy.

Some 3/4-time versions are on recordings by Phil Woods (Musique du Bois, 1974) and Dr. Lonnie Smith (Jungle Soul, 2006).

It was a major hit for the British duo Chad & Jeremy. In January 1965, it reached No. 15 on the Billboard Hot 100, and went to No. 1 on the Adult Contemporary chart. It was included on their Yesterday's Gone album and many subsequent compilations.

=== Notable cover versions ===
- Paul Whiteman with Irene Taylor (1932)
- Stan Kenton with June Christy (1946)
- Art Tatum (1949)
- Billie Holiday – Lady Sings the Blues (1956)
- Sarah Vaughan – At Mister Kelly's (1957)
- Red Garland – Groovy (1957)
- Frank Sinatra – Frank Sinatra Sings for Only the Lonely (1958)
- The Thad Jones/Mel Lewis Orchestra – Presenting Thad Jones/Mel Lewis and the Jazz Orchestra (1966)
- Phil Woods with Jaki Byard – Musique du Bois (1974)
- Dorothy Donegan – The Many Faces of Dorothy Donegan (1975)
- Carmel – The Drum is Everything (1984)
- Andy Bey – Ballads, Blues, and Bey (1995)
- Tin Hat Trio with Willie Nelson on vocals – The Rodeo Eroded (2002)
- Bennie Wallace with Kenny Barron – The Nearness of You (2003)
- Flea and the Honora Band – Honora (2026)
- Wes Montgomery - Willow Weep for Me

== Chart history ==
Chad & Jeremy

Chart (1964–65)	Peak position
Canada RPM Top Singles	13
US Billboard Hot 100	15
US Billboard Adult Contemporary	1
US Cash Box Top 100	22

Carmel cover

Chart (1983)	Peak position
UK	79

== See also ==
- List of 1930s jazz standards
- List of number-one adult contemporary singles of 1965 (U.S.)
