= Chad & Jeremy =

British musical duo

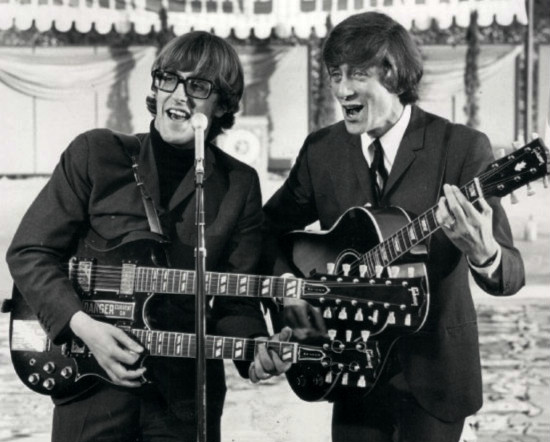
- Chad & Jeremy performing for a television special at Marineland, 1966

Background information
- Origin: England
- Genres: Pop; folk
- Years active: 1962–1968, 1983–1987, 2003–2016
- Labels: UK: Ember; US: World Artists, Capitol, Columbia, Sidewalk, Rocshire
- Past members: Chad Stuart; Jeremy Clyde
- Website: Chad & Jeremy official website

Chad & Jeremy were a British musical duo consisting of Chad Stuart and Jeremy Clyde, who began working in 1962 and had their first hit song in the UK with "Yesterday's Gone" (1963). That song became a hit in the United States in the following year as part of the British Invasion. Unlike the rock-influenced beat music of their peers, Chad & Jeremy performed in a soft, folk-inflected style characterized by hushed and whispered vocals. The duo had a string of hits in the United States, including "Willow Weep for Me", "Before and After", and their biggest hit, "A Summer Song". After some commercial failures and divergent personal ambitions, Chad & Jeremy disbanded in 1968.

Chad Stuart continued to work in the music industry, while Jeremy Clyde became a film and stage actor. In the early 1980s, the duo reunited to record a new album and perform concerts, including a multi-band British Invasion nostalgia tour. After another long period of separation, in the early 2000s, Chad & Jeremy began performing again and developed a semi-regular tour schedule for many years. Chad Stuart retired in 2016 and died on December 20, 2020, while Jeremy Clyde continues to tour and record as a solo artist.

== Early years ==
Chad Stuart was born David Stuart Chadwick on 10 December 1941 in Windermere, Westmorland, and Jeremy Clyde was born Michael Thomas Jeremy Clyde on 22 March 1941 in Dorney, Buckinghamshire. The two met while attending London's Central School of Speech and Drama. Chad taught Jeremy to play the guitar. By 1962, they were performing together as a folk-music duo. They also formed a sideline project, a rock & roll band called the Jerks. After graduating from drama school, both musical groups were abandoned when Clyde left for Scotland to work for a short period at Dundee Repertory Theatre. Stuart worked in the music industry as a copyist and apprentice arranger. When Clyde returned, the pair resumed their folk act.

== Early career ==
Chad & Jeremy frequently performed in London at a basement coffeehouse called Tina's, where they were discovered by John Barry. The influential composer quickly got them a contract with a small British record label, Ember. Their first single was "Yesterday's Gone", a Stuart composition that became their only hit record in the UK, reaching No. 37 in December 1963.

As the duo recorded this song, they developed their trademark singing style: "whispering". "[John Barry] told us ... we sounded like a locker room full of football players ... in the end in desperation he said: 'Whisper it', so we kind of backed off a bit and so that sort of slightly sotto voce sound came about". They developed a style in which Jeremy usually sang the melody while Chad sang the higher harmonies.

== British Invasion years ==
In 1964, Chad & Jeremy arrived in the United States as part of the British Invasion. According to Stuart, "We snuck in under the radar" because even though their folk songs and strings-backed ballads bore little resemblance to the rock music of most of their colleagues, they gained widespread acceptance in the US. "Yesterday's Gone" was released in the US by another small record label, World Artists Records, and rose to No. 21 in the Billboard Hot 100.

Their second US single, "A Summer Song" (produced by Shel Talmy), was a surprise hit that Chad & Jeremy had intended as an album track. World Artists, however, released it as a single and it rose to No. 7 on the Billboard Hot 100 on 17 October 1964.

They became World Artists' most bankable act; Stuart said: "After that, the record company goes, 'Gee whiz, we've got a goldmine here, so let's start churning out those ballads, boys!' " The next single was a cover version of an Ann Ronell standard "Willow Weep for Me" (produced by Shel Talmy), which reached No. 15 on the US Hot 100 and No. 1 on the Easy Listening chart. All three hits were included on their 1964 debut album, Yesterday's Gone, which spent 39 weeks on the Billboard 200 and eventually peaked at No. 22.

=== 1965 ===
In January 1965, Chad & Jeremy were in talks with a major label, Columbia Records. On 27 March, they signed a contract giving Columbia control over all Chad & Jeremy recordings retroactively to 1 January 1965. Before the end of 1964, however, the duo had made a new batch of recordings, giving the minor labels a backlog of material to release throughout the following months. The first World Artists single of 1965, the Rodgers and Hammerstein theatre song from Carousel named "If I Loved You", hit US No. 23 in April. Their follow-up singles were less successful: a Stuart and Clyde original, "What Do You Want With Me", peaked at US No. 51 in May, and a cover of Lennon and McCartney's "From a Window" peaked at No. 97 in the US in July. The latter two songs were included on the duo's second World Artists album Chad & Jeremy Sing For You (1965).

Columbia quickly released a new album, Before and After, in June. The title track single "Before and After" peaked at US No. 17 almost immediately. That was followed just a few months later by I Don't Want to Lose You Baby. The title track was composed by Van McCoy and preceded the album as a summer single, which peaked at US No. 35 in August. The next single, "I Have Dreamed", peaked at US No. 91 in November and at No. 22 on the Easy Listening chart. Chad & Jeremy garnered some attention in Sweden when the B-side of "I Have Dreamed", "Should I" (written by the pair) was covered by the Hep Stars in a version which reached the top-5 in Sweden in early 1966.

The duo went on a year-long hiatus in mid-1965 when Clyde accepted an acting role in a London stage production of The Passion Flower Hotel. Clyde expressed his reasoning, and his regret, to an interviewer in 2014:

It’s a question of values, isn’t it? ... I don’t think I realized how big we were in America. To me, it was starring in the West End, which sort of overrode everything in my value system ... Would I have done it now? No, probably not. I would not have let Chad down—which I did at the time—for which I was duly sorry. He came over here and we made an album [never released] while I was performing at night. We kept it all going, but I wouldn’t have done it that way now because I probably would have realized that we had this one shot at America and I would have stuck with that and hoped to get into the West End later.

Stuart said, "I was the partner of an actor who was constantly threatening to leave the act, and did". After finishing the album in London—most of which was scrapped— he returned to the US and began working on music with his wife Jill. As Chad & Jill, they performed the Chad & Jeremy songs "I Don't Want to Lose You Baby" and "Funny How Love Can Be" on the television show Shindig! in September. In late November, Columbia arranged for Chad & Jill to sing on television again, this time a rendition of the folk music standard "The Cruel War" on Hullabaloo.

=== 1966 ===
Clyde returned from London after about nine months away. In February, Chad & Jeremy played at the 1966 Sanremo Music Festival, singing a version of Sergio Endrigo's composition "Adesso sì", which was released as a single by CBS Italy. Around the same time, Columbia released a new Chad and Jeremy single in the US, the Dylanesque "Teenage Failure", which peaked at No. 131. In April, Columbia released Chad & Jill's "The Cruel War" as a single that is backed with "I Can't Talk to You". The single reached No. 110 on the Billboard Bubbling Under Hot 100. Jill, who had never sought the working partnership, was happy to let it go. Her husband later said, "I thought I needed to go out there with someone ... It really wasn't fair to expect her to do that".

Chad & Jeremy began to work in earnest again and recorded the album Distant Shores, which was released in August 1966. The title song was composed by their bassist James William Guercio, who later enjoyed fame as a producer for Chicago and Blood, Sweat & Tears. "Distant Shores" was their last Top 40 hit; it reached US No. 30 in August while a second single "You Are She" peaked at No. 87 in November.

Chad & Jeremy were far more popular in the US than at home. The duo had 11 songs enter the US Hot 100—seven of which peaked in the Top 40—between 1964 and 1966. In February 1966, the British music magazine NME said the duo had applied for US citizenship and that as American citizens, they would be eligible for military conscription and they had no wish to fight in the Vietnam War. The practicalities of constantly renewing US work permits were problematic.

=== Television work ===
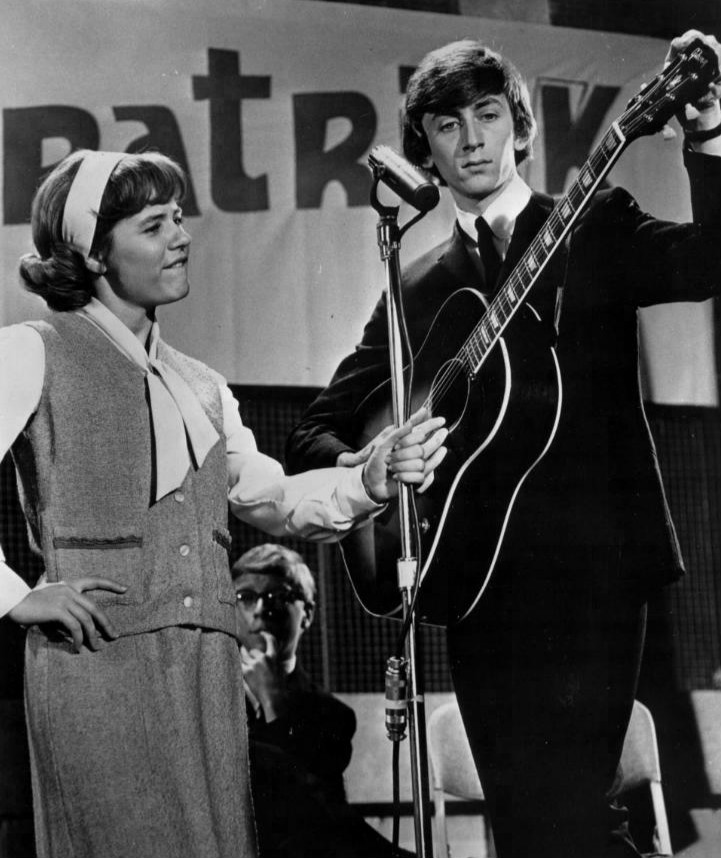
Promotional photo of Clyde with Patty Duke (1965)

During the mid-1960s, Chad & Jeremy made several television guest appearances. They portrayed a fictional singing duo called "The Redcoats" (Freddy and Ernie) on the 10 February 1965 episode of the sitcom The Dick Van Dyke Show that satirised Beatlemania. "I Don't Want No Other Baby But You" and "My, How the Time Goes By" were featured in that episode. One week later, they appeared on The Patty Duke Show as "Nigel & Patrick", an unknown British singing duo in need of promotion and sang the song "The Truth Often Hurts The Heart" (twice), which was inexplicably never issued as a single. In an interview marking the 50th anniversary of the show's debut, Patty Duke said of that particular episode; "I was obsessed with them ... that was a big week for me".

They were guest stars on an episode of Laredo—"That's Noway, Thataway", first broadcast on 20 January 1966—in which they played destitute English actors travelling through the Old West. The episode was intended as a pilot for a Chad & Jeremy television show that was titled Paleface but was never produced.

The duo appeared as themselves in the December 1966 episodes "The Cat's Meow" and "The Bat's Kow Tow" of the television series Batman, in which the guest villain was Julie Newmar as Catwoman. In this two-part storyline, Catwoman's master plan includes "stealing" the voices of Chad & Jeremy. During "The Bat's Kow-Tow", the duo sang "Distant Shores" and "Teenage Failure".

Separately, Stuart did a little voice acting, appearing as a vulture in Walt Disney's 1967 film The Jungle Book. The same year, Clyde appeared on his own in a Season 8 episode of My Three Sons.

== Late 1960s and breakup ==
In late 1967, Chad & Jeremy released the psychedelic album Of Cabbages and Kings as "Chad Stuart and Jeremy Clyde", and a 1968 follow-up called The Ark. The albums received critical acclaim but were commercial failures.

In 1968, they collaborated for the film soundtrack of Three in the Attic, which stars Christopher Jones and Yvette Mimieux. They recorded several new songs for the film and Stuart composed an instrumental backing score. The complete soundtrack was released in the US on Sidewalk Records in 1969 and features the duo's version of "Paxton's Song (Smoke)", which was sung by Jones in the film. By the end of 1968, however, the working relationship between Stuart and Clyde had dissolved.

In later years Stuart said there was regret for the breakup but at the time the pair suffered from "fatigue and burn-out". Cost overruns in the making of The Ark had soured relations with Columbia and left the two in debt; according to Stuart they were constantly "pushed around by accountants and lawyers". Clyde announced he was returning to the theatre and Columbia management reacted by suspending the duo's contract. Stuart said he and Clyde "very foolishly tore up" their contract and parted. He said, "Our attitudes were, 'Who needs you?' Looking back though, we never should have done that. We should have kept it up. But we were only kids."

== 1980s reunion ==
After the split, Clyde returned to England and took up acting as a full-time vocation. He enjoyed great success and made several returns to New York in Broadway theater productions. In 1970, he began a well-received starring role in Conduct Unbecoming at the Ethel Barrymore Theater. Stuart remained in the US with plans to continue in the music industry in background roles such as arrangement and production. His first job was as music director for the Smothers Brothers' television show. He later served as a staff producer for A&M Records. The pair met again in 1977 to record a few demos, but the collaboration was brief, and no recordings were released.

In 1982, Chad & Jeremy reunited to record the album Chad Stuart & Jeremy Clyde, which was released the following year on the MCA-distributed label Rocshire Records. This album was released in 1983. A music video was filmed for the single "Bite The Bullet". Plans for a second album in 1984 were advancing when the label suddenly went bankrupt due to legal issues surrounding the label's owners. The pair starred in the West End production of Pump Boys and Dinettes from 1984 to 1985.

Returning to the US in 1986 for a British Invasion reunion tour, Chad & Jeremy played 33 cities in six weeks alongside Freddie and the Dreamers, Gerry and the Pacemakers, the Searchers and the Mindbenders. In his review of the show at New York City's Felt Forum, music journalist Jeff Tamarkin wrote: "The evening's unquestionable highlight was the set from Chad (Stuart) & Jeremy (Clyde), which featured such soft, folky hits as 'A Summer Song' and 'Yesterday's Gone', and even a few obscurities from their later career. The duo's harmonies were sweet, their young band tight, and their lack of tacky cover songs refreshing."

In 1987, Chad & Jeremy performed a two-week residency at Harrah's in Lake Tahoe, Nevada, before parting again.

== 2000s and later ==
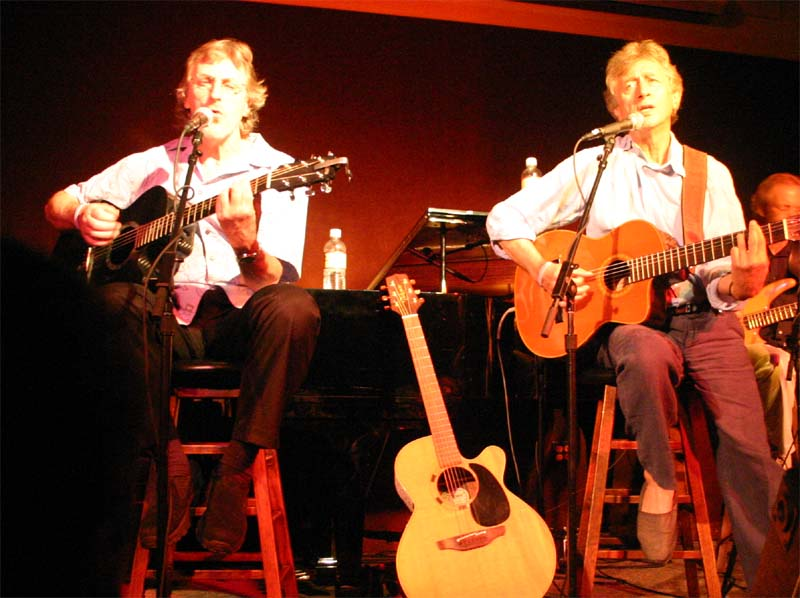
Chad and Jeremy performing in 2005

In 2002, Stuart was in his private studio preparing the release of a recording from the Harrah's engagement when Clyde visited and the two recorded a new version of "Yesterday's Gone" as a bonus track for the album In Concert (The Official Bootleg). In 2003, PBS reunited Chad & Jeremy in the 60s Pop-Rock Reunion special, which also prompted a concert tour the next year. They rerecorded a number of their 1960s songs and dubbed the resulting album Ark-eology; it was released in 2008, the 40th anniversary of The Ark. Chad & Jeremy performed at the Sundance Film Festival in Park City, Utah, in January 2009. In September 2010, Chad & Jeremy marked the anniversary of their first meeting with a limited-edition CD entitled Fifty Years On.

After 15 years of semi-regular touring, Stuart retired to his home in Sun Valley, Idaho. Clyde now tours as a solo artist with a backing band, interlacing Chad & Jeremy songs with newer music from his own multi-album series, The Bottom Drawer Sessions. He also tours as part of a duo, performing nostalgic concerts with one of his oldest friends, Peter Asher of Peter & Gordon.

Stuart died on 20 December 2020, from pneumonia following a fall.

== Discography ==
=== Studio albums ===
- Yesterday's Gone (24th July 1964) US No. 22 - released in Britain as Chad & Jeremy Sing For You (1965)
- Chad & Jeremy Sing for You (20th March 1965) US No. 69 - released in Britain as Second Album (1966)
- Before and After (25th May 1965) US No. 37
- I Don't Want to Lose You Baby (27th September 1965) US No. 77
- Distant Shores (15th August 1966) US No. 61
- Of Cabbages and Kings (11th September 1967) US No. 186
- The Ark (15th August 1968)
- 3 in the Attic (December 1968)
- Chad Stuart & Jeremy Clyde (15th November 1983)
- Ark-eology (21st October 2008)
- Fifty Years On (2010)

=== Live album ===
- In Concert (The Official Bootleg) (2002)

=== Compilations ===
- The Best of Chad & Jeremy (Capitol, 1966) US No. 49
- More Chad & Jeremy (Capitol, 1966) US No. 144
- The Best of Chad & Jeremy (K-Tel, 1990)
- The Very Best of Chad & Jeremy (Varèse Sarabande, 2000)
- Now and Forever (Acrobat, 2007)
- Yesterday's Gone: The Complete Ember & World Artists Recordings (RPM, 2016)

=== Singles ===
Year	Songs Both sides from same album except where indicated	UK Singles Chart	Canada CHUM Chart RPM 100	U.S. Hot 100	U.S. AC	Album
1963	"Yesterday's Gone" b/w "Lemon Tree" (from More Chad & Jeremy)	37	20	21	–	Yesterday's Gone
1964	"Like I Love You Today" b/w "Early in the Morning" (Non-LP track)	–	–	–	–	Yesterday's Gone
1964	"A Summer Song" b/w "No Tears for Johnnie"	–	6	7	2	Yesterday's Gone
1964	"Willow Weep for Me" b/w "If She Was Mine"	–	13	15	1	Yesterday's Gone
1965	"If I Loved You" b/w "Donna, Donna" (from Chad & Jeremy Sing for You)	–	16	23	6	The Best of Chad & Jeremy
1965	"What Do You Want with Me?" b/w "A Very Good Year" (from More Chad & Jeremy)	–	5	51	9	Chad & Jeremy Sing for You
1965	"Before and After" b/w "Fare Thee Well (I Must Be Gone)"	–	31	17	4	Before and After
1965	"From a Window" b/w "My Coloring Book"	–	38	97	–	Chad & Jeremy Sing for You
1965	"I Don't Wanna Lose You Baby" b/w "Pennies" (Non-LP track)	–	13	35	–	I Don't Want to Lose You Baby
1965	"September in the Rain" b/w "Only for the Young"	–	–	–	–	Yesterday's Gone
1965	"I Have Dreamed" b/w "Should I"	–	–	91	22	I Don't Want to Lose You Baby
1966	"Teenage Failure" b/w "Early Mornin' Rain" (from Distant Shores)	–	–	–	–	Non-album single
1966	"Distant Shores" b/w "Last Night" (Non-LP track)	–	16	30	–	Distant Shores
1966	"You Are She" b/w "I Won't Cry"	–	–	87	–	Distant Shores
1966	"Adesso Sì" b/w "Nessuno Più Di Me"	–	–	-	–	Non-album single; Italy only (Sanremo Music Festival, 1966)
1967	"Painted Dayglow Smile" b/w "Editorial (Vocal)" (from Of Cabbages and Kings)	–	–	–	–	The Ark
1968	"Sister Marie" b/w "Rest in Peace" (from Of Cabbages and Kings)	–	–	–	–	Non-album single
1969	"Paxton Quigley's Had the Course" b/w "You Need Feet (You Need Hands)"	–	–	–	–	The Ark
1983	"Zanzibar Sunset" b/w "Dreams"	–	–	–	–	Chad Stuart & Jeremy Clyde
