= At Home (short story) =

1897 story by Anton Chekhov

- Short story by Anton Chekhov
- Original title: В родном углу
- Translator: Constance Garnett (1916)
- Language: Russian

Publication
- Published in: Russkiye Vedomosti
- Publisher: Adolf Marks (1901)
- Publication date: November 1897
- Publication place: Russia

"At Home" (Russian: В родном углу, romanized: V rodnom uglu) is an 1897 short story by Anton Chekhov.

== Background ==
"At Home" was preceded by the novella Peasants, published in April of that year, after which there was several months' break caused by Chekhov's deteriorating health. "On the account of bad weather have bought myself some paper and now sit down to write a story," Chekhov informed his sister Maria Pavlovna on 9 October 1897. "Just started to write a bit and maybe will get used to somebody else's writing desk," he wrote to his cousin Georgy Mitrofanovich Chekhov on 11 October, also from Nice, France.

In retrospect, and on the basis of Chekhov's notebooks, "At Home" is now regarded as closely related to "The Petcheneg" and "In the Cart". All three stories, similar in terms of atmosphere and mood, have been worked upon during the same period, simultaneously at times.

According to Maria Chekhova, the place Vera Kardina arrives at is "a large Ukrainian village of Mezhirichi" which the author had passed through in 1888. The children's writer Pavel Surozhski insisted that the area described here, as well as in "The Petcheneg", belongs to the Northern part of the Taganrog okrug, which Chekhov passed through during his trip in August 1896.

== Publication ==
The story was first published on November 29 [16, old style] in Russkiye Vedomosti, No. 317, 1897 (pp. 2–3), signed: "Anton Chekhov. Nice. October". Chekhov included it into Volume 9 of his Collected Works published by Adolf Marks in 1899–1901. In his 3 November 1897 letter to Lydia Avilova he dismissed "At Home" and "The Petcheneg" as 'mere trifles'. But, preparing his stories for the Alfred Marks' Complete Works, he asked (in the 31 January 1899 letter) for both of them to be sent to him to Yalta and did not make any significant changes to the texts before sending them to the publisher.

In December 1897 the Swedish translator J. Stadling asked Chekhov for his permission for the two stories, "The Petcheneg" and "At Home" to be translated, for the Aftonbladet newspaper. Chekhov gave his permission in the 18 December 1897 letter to M.G. Vecheslov. (Note: Mikhail Georgievich Vecheslov (1869-1944) was a Kazan-born doctor and professional revolutionary who, having been expelled from the University, was deported to Helsingfors (Helsinki) and completed his education in Sweden. His correspondence with Chekhov dealt with the subject of translation of his stories into Swedish, starting with "My Life".)

Translated into English by Constance Garnett, it was included into the 1916 The Duel and Other Stories collection.

== Synopsis ==
Both of her parents now dead, the young Vera Kardina returns to her estate, run now by her aunt. Approaching the house, lost in a vast Donetsk steppe, she enjoys the quietness of the place, but has the uneasy feeling that life here might be unbearably dull.

Things do not get better as time goes by. Aunt Dasha turns out to be somewhat vulgar provincial grand dame, insincere and occasionally obnoxious, the decrepit grandfather is rude and gluttonous, the local doctor Neshchapov who'd "fell in love with [Vera’s] photo portrait" (if the aunt is to be believed) seems vacuous and bland. Her two main distractions, entreating the guests and visiting the church, become more and more unbearable.

Soon Vera starts to realize that the dreams she'd cherished, of "finding true love here" and "helping the poor" were vain fantasies. At one point, getting mad with her rather slow-witted maid Alyona, she shouts at her and is instantly taken aback, realizing that the phrase she's just used ("Twenty five lashes for her!") is taken straight from her grandfather's old book. She eventually succumbs to the idea of marrying the doctor whom she intensely dislikes, just to get out of the house, and because this seems to be the only course to pursue.

== Reception ==
In her 9 December 1897 letter Maria Pavlovna informed her brother: "[At Home] is much talked about in Moscow and everybody loves it." Some of his other correspondents, though, expressed reservations. Doctor N.I. Korobov, whom Chekhov knew from their University days, enquired: "Why such pessimistic stories in Russkiye Vedomosti? Write something life-affirming, bringing to life youth memories when one wants to jump with joy of living!

Pyotr I. Dyakonov, a well-known Russian surgeon, while expressing great interest in the story and the details concerning it, wrote: "I have to admit, the general impression that [At Home and The Petcheneg] leave, is rather depressing... Surely life [in Russia] provides every possible reason for such attitude. But the fine surroundings, the pictures of nature you now live amongst, the diversity of your impressions and other fine aspects of travelling might have served well to dispel this mood? "

The anonymous Courier reviewer, in his 4 December 1897 article called "The Latest Stories by A.P. Chekhov", wrote of "the two marvellous stories in Russkiye Vedomosti, full of the Chekhov of old's power and talent... [they] evoke mostly heavy thoughts and bitter feelings, but is it the artist's fault that life itself confronts him only with sad images, evoking somber sounds from his lyre?.. Besides, our author's forte is depicting with great power the darker sides of life, eliciting in him either irony, or satiric smile or grief and sorrow." According to the reviewer, "Chekhov's Vera is another fine and true portrait in the vast gallery of Russian women," starting from Pushkin's Tatyana, sharing the same pain of broken dreams and shattered lives.

V. Albov in Mir Bozhiy felt disappointed with how Vera Kardina "totally refuses to resist" what seems to be he fate, much in the vein of many other Chekhov's female characters, who "easily give themselves to whatever monster comes their way." The critic explained this as part of Chekhov's peculiar attitude towards his characters. "A lonely, doomed dreamer, living in the society where the great majority is being driven by animal instincts, this picture appealed to Chekhov a lot," Albov wrote in 1903.
