= Bei uns z'Haus =

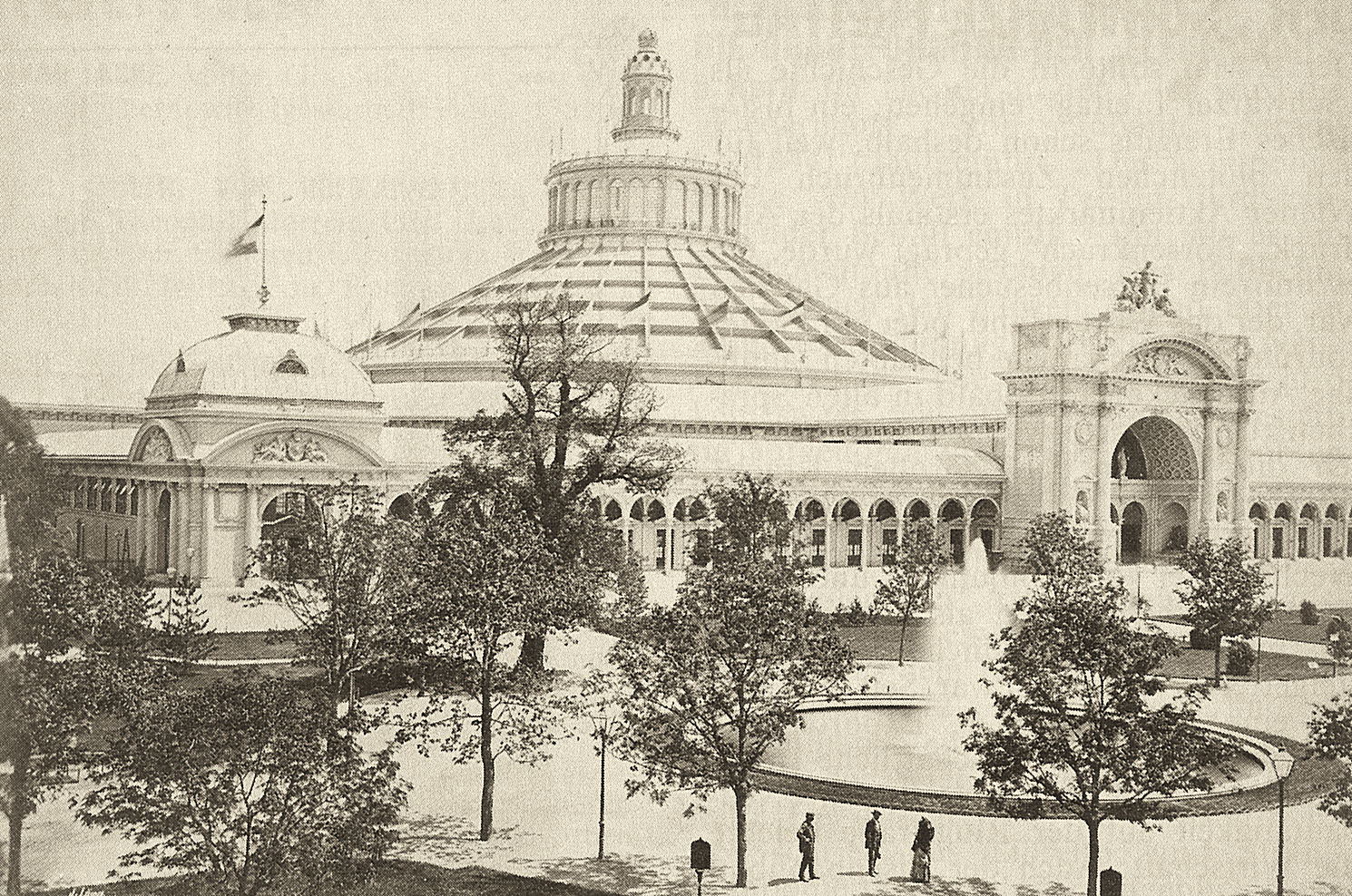
1873 Vienna World's Fair

Bei uns z'Haus (At Home), Op. 361, is a Viennese waltz composed by Johann Strauss II for the 1873 Vienna World's Fair. It was first performed in August 1873 at the 'Neue Welt' establishment in Hietzing, Vienna.

The composition was dedicated to Princess Marie Hohenlohe-Schillingsfürst, wife of the Master of the Royal Household, Konstantin of Hohenlohe-Schillingsfürst. The Wiener Abendpost commented that "Strauss's 'Bei uns z'Haus', like his other choral waltz "The Blue Danube", will soon become popular not only 'at home' but also in the whole world."

Waltz 1
