= Yesterday's Gone (Chad & Jeremy album) =

Studio album by Chad & Jeremy
- Released: July 1964
- Genre: Folk
- Label: World Artists Records
- Producer: Shel Talmy

Chad & Jeremy chronology
Yesterday's Gone (1964)	Sing for You (1965)

Singles from Yesterday's Gone
- 1. "Yesterday's Gone" / "Lemon Tree" Released: 1963; 2. "Like I Love You Today" / "Early in the Morning" Released: 1964; 3. "A Summer Song" / "No Tears for Johnnie" Released: 1964; 4. "Willow Weep for Me" / "If She Were Mine" Released: 1964

Yesterday's Gone is the debut studio album by English duo Chad & Jeremy. It was released in the United States in July 1964. The album contains three of their American hits: "A Summer Song", "Willow Weep for Me", and the title song, "Yesterday's Gone." The song "The Truth Often Hurts the Heart" was prominently featured in a January 1965 episode of the television program The Patty Duke Show, but was never issued as a single.

== Chart performance ==
The album debuted on Billboard magazine's Top LP's chart in the issue dated September 26, 1964, peaking at No. 22 during a thirty-nine-week run on the chart.

== Track listing ==
1. "A Summer Song" (Chad Stuart, Clive Metcalfe, Keith Noble) – 2:38
2. "Now and Forever" (Martin Dean) – 1:45
3. "Dirty Old Town" (Ewan MacColl) – 3:04
4. "Like I Love You Today" (Russell Alquist, Chad Stuart) – 2:38
5. "September in the Rain" (Harry Warren, Al Dubin) – 2:30
6. "Yesterday's Gone" (Chad Stuart, Wendy Kidd) – 2:29
7. "If She Was Mine" (Bobby Goldsboro, Buddy Buie) – 2:03
8. "Willow Weep for Me" (Ann Ronell)– 2:33
9. "Only for the Young" (instrumental) (Jimmy Seals) - 2:55
10. "Too Soon My Love" (Russell Alquist) – 2:28
11. "The Truth Often Hurts the Heart" (Clive Metcalfe, Keith Noble) - 2:49
12. "No Tears for Johnnie" (Tom Springfield) - 2:58

== Charts ==
Chart (1964)	Peak position
US Billboard Top LPs	22
