= A Summer Song =

- Dutch release

Single by Chad & Jeremy

from the album Yesterday's Gone
- B-side: "No Tears for Johnnie"
- Released: July 1964
- Recorded: June 1964; CTS Studios
- Genre: Soft rock; folk-pop
- Length: 2:38
- Label: Ember (UK); World Artists Records (US)
- Songwriters: Clive Metcalfe, Keith Noble, Chad Stuart
- Producer: Shel Talmy

Chad & Jeremy singles chronology
"Yesterday's Gone" (1963)	"A Summer Song" (1964)	"Willow Weep for Me" (1964)

"A Summer Song" is a 1964 song by the English pop music duo Chad & Jeremy. The song was written by Clive Metcalfe, Keith Noble and Chad Stuart.

== Background ==
Like the duo's breakthrough selection, "Yesterday's Gone", "A Summer Song" is a reminiscence of a summer romance. However, "A Summer Song" eschews the Merseybeat sound of "Yesterday's Gone" in favour of a gentler folk-influenced arrangement, with the lyrics also being wistful in tone.

On The Steel Pier Radio Show, Stuart recalled that his collaborators on "A Summer Song", Clive Metcalfe and Keith Noble, were a musical duo linked to Pink Floyd with whom he and Jeremy Clyde had become friendly, and that "A Summer Song" was written and composed in Stuart's flat in London: "We were sitting around jamming on four chords and we came up with 'A Summer Song'." Clive Metcalfe wrote the melody late one night and Keith later added lyrics. Metcalfe said: "We performed it one night at Tina's (a Bistro in Piccadilly London) when Chad was visiting. Chad liked the song and later re-wrote the middle, and we all reworked the lyrics, as you hear it today". "We never thought 'Summer Song' could possibly be a single," Chad recalled another time. "It was just a pretty, romantic song. Or so we thought...you never can tell, can you?"

The selection was one of a number to be included on the Yesterday's Gone album recorded at CTS Studios Bayswater in June 1964 under the production auspices of Shel Talmy, with Johnnie Spence conducting the orchestra.

"A Summer Song" was issued in both the UK and the U.S. in July 1964. The UK single version opens with Chad and Jeremy trading vocals while the U.S. single features unisonant singing throughout.

== Impact ==
"A Summer Song" was played on Juke Box Jury and guest-judge Ringo Starr assessed the track as a "miss" (i.e., flop), with no U.S. hit potential. Indeed, in the UK, where Chad & Jeremy's "Yesterday's Gone" had been a mild hit, followed by the unsuccessful "Like I Love You Today", "A Summer Song" did not reach the charts; possibly because it was released on a very small label and was largely unobtainable in the shops. An article in New Musical Express complained of that fact. However, in the United States, following the near-Top 20 success of "Yesterday's Gone", the track afforded the duo their career record, reaching #7 on the Billboard Hot 100 the week of 17–24 October 1964. "A Summer Song" also went to #2 for six weeks on the Adult Contemporary chart. It is considered one of the signature songs of the British Invasion. When Gary James asked him about it, Stuart suggested: "The American market was bigger. [...] You'd never hear something that sweet in the British charts. [...] For some reason in America it worked."

"A Summer Song" also reached #6 in Canada and #49 in Australia. The selection is featured on the soundtracks of the films Rushmore (1998), The Princess Diaries (2001), and Men in Black 3 (2012), and was used in the "ESPN's Sports Heaven" commercial that aired during Super Bowl XL in 2006. It also appeared in a 2019 TV commercial for Coors Light.

== Remakes ==
The Lettermen recorded "A Summer Song" for their August 1965 Capitol Records album release The Hit Sounds of the Lettermen, produced by Steve Douglas. The Lettermen made a second recording of the song for "Alive" Again...Naturally, a 1973 Capitol Records release which the group self-produced with Ed Cobb. Both versions of "A Summer Song" by the Lettermen abridged the original three word title to "Summer Song."

Skeeter Davis's RCA Victor album release, Singin' in the Summer Sun, which Chet Atkins and Felton Jarvis produced, included Davis' version of "A Summer Song". The album was recorded in January 1966 at RCA Victor Studio in Nashville, Tennessee, for release that June.

In the summer of 1967, the Doodletown Pipers had an Easy Listening hit with their remake of "A Summer Song", produced by Stu Phillips. The Epic Records release reached No. 29 on the Easy Listening charts, affording the group their only chart appearance. Also in 1967, the Memories, an Irish group, who became a top showband attraction and scored eight domestic chart hits, remade "A Summer Song" as their debut single, released on Rex Records.

A cover by Swedish pop rock band the Hounds was released as a single by Gazell on 23 August 1967, backed by the song "Never Try to Catch the Sun. Their rendition reached No. 6 on Tio i Topp and No. 18 on Kvällstoppen in Sweden, becoming their fourth consecutive top-ten single there.

A version of "A Summer Song"^{1} by Laila Kinnunen was issued by Mediamusiikki in 2000 on the compilation CD Muistojen Kyyneleet, which featured selections Kinnunen had recorded with the Erkki Melakoski (fi) orchestra for the Yleisradio TV series Kuukauden Suositut. Kinnunen's performance of "A Summer Song" was prepped to air in that series' 1966 season.

A French rendering of "A Summer Song", entitled "Souviens-toi des nuits d'été", was released in 1965 by Frank Alamo on the Rivièra label. The B-side of Alamo's single "Qu'est-ce Que Peut Bien Faire Un Garçon", "Souviens-toi des nuits d'été" was also included on a four track EP and was subsequently included on the singer's 1966 self-titled album release. "Souviens-toi des nuits d'été" was also recorded by Line Renaud, her rendition being included on a four-track 1966 EP, released by Disques Line.

A Finnish rendering of "A Summer Song", entitled "Kesämuisto",^{1} was recorded by Eero ja Jussi & the Boys (with Jussi Raittinen and Eero Raittinen) for their 1991 Audiovox Records album release 3 Kitaraa (fi), and the selection was one of several on the album recorded at Ogeli Recording Studio between January and February 1991.
