= Lambert and Nuttycombe =

Lambert and Nuttycombe were an acoustic folk duo from Los Angeles active 1968-1973. The duo was formed by Craig Nuttycombe and California surf musician Denis Lambert who had met in a West Coast band called The Eastside Kids. The duo's recordings were reissued on CD in Japan in 2001.

== Discography ==
- At Home A&M Records 1970
- As You Will 1973
- Eternal Rivers : Demos 1969-1971
- Old Friends - compilation for Japan market
- Days Gone By - compilation for Japan market
