= Lee Rose (director) =

American film director

- Occupations: Film director, television director, television producer, television writer
- Years active: 1993–present

Lee Rose is an American director, producer and writer of film and television.

Rose began her professional career in 1993 producing and writing the television film It's Nothing Personal. Throughout the 1990s, she also worked on the films Deconstructing Sarah, A Mother's Prayer, An Unexpected Family, and An Unexpected Life. She made her directorial debut with the 1998 film, The Color of Courage, starring Linda Hamilton and Lynn Whitfield.

Her TV film credits continued into the 2000s, including The Truth About Jane, A Girl Thing, What Girls Learn, An Unexpected Love, Jack, and A Taste of Romance.

In 2004, Rose began directing episodic television. Her credits include Soul Food, Weeds, Related, Cashmere Mafia, Lincoln Heights, Lost Girl, Greek, XIII: The Series, The Glades, In Plain Sight, Haven, Under the Dome, and True Blood. Current TV series that she is involved with include Grace and Frankie, Code Black, Star Trek: Discovery, and Firefly Lane.

Rose is taking on the role of executive producer for an upcoming series titled True North for which she also wrote the script.

== See also ==
- List of female film and television directors
- List of lesbian filmmakers
- List of LGBT-related films directed by women
