= Fare Thee Well (song) =

18th-century English folk ballad

"Fare Thee Well" (also known as "The Turtle Dove" or "10,000 Miles") is an 18th-century English folk ballad, listed as number 422 in the Roud Folk Song Index. In the song, a lover bids farewell before setting off on a journey.

== History ==
The song likely arose as an English folk song called "The True Lover's Farewell". It thus shares an origin with other songs, such as "The Lass of Roch Royal", "The False True-Lover", "Who will Shoe your Pretty Little Foot", and others. The song traveled to the Appalachian mountains, and was collected in Kentucky in 1937 by Alan Lomax. A Canadian version exists, "My Dear Mary Ann", first collected by Marius Barbeau. Barbeau dated the song to at least 1850.

It shares a Roud number with, but is likely unrelated to, "Careless Love".

"Fare Thee Well" shares lyrics and thematic content with Robert Burns's "A Red, Red Rose". The Horn Fair Garland, dated to approximately 1770, belonging to a young Burns contained a song titled "The loyal Lover's faithful promise to his Sweet - heart on his going a long journey", likely a version of "The True Lover's Farewell", which is thought to have inspired "A Red, Red Rose".

In 1907, the composer and folk-song scholar Ralph Vaughan Williams recorded David Penfold, an innkeeper from Rusper, Sussex, singing "Turtle Dove", and the recording is available online via the British Library Sound Archive.

== Musical arrangements ==
In 1919, Vaughan Williams wrote an arrangement of the song, entitled "The Turtle Dove", for solo baritone (later re-arranged for solo and SATB choir). Tia Blake released a version of the song similar to Vaughan Williams' arrangement and the original phonograph recording on her album Folk Songs & Ballads: Tia Blake and Her Folk-group.

The song has been recorded by Nic Jones, Joan Baez on her 1960 debut album, Mary Black, Eliza Carthy, Chad & Jeremy, Mary Chapin Carpenter, Liam Clancy, Marianne Faithfull, Burl Ives, Molina and Roberts, Bonny Light Horseman, Pete Seeger and June Tabor.

Mary Chapin Carpenter's version was used in the movie Fly Away Home (1996). The King's Singers performed and recorded an arrangement of The Turtle Dove by their baritone Philip Lawson (composer and arranger)

== Lyrics ==
The following lyrics were adapted by Vaughan Williams from the phonograph recording of David Penfold.

Fare you well my dear, I must be gone
And leave you for a while
If I roam away, I'll come back again
Though I roam ten thousand miles, my dear
Though I roam ten thousand miles

So fair thou art, my bonny lass
So deep in love am I
But I never will prove false to the bonny lass I love
Till the stars fall from the sky, my dear
Till the stars fall from the sky

The sea will never run dry, my dear
Nor the rocks never melt with the sun
But I never will prove false to the bonny lass I love
Till all these things be done, my dear
Till all these things be done

O yonder doth sit that little turtle dove
He doth sit on yonder high tree
A making a moan for the loss of his love
As I will do for thee, my dear
As I will do for thee
