= I Don't Want to Lose You Baby =

Studio album by Chad & Jeremy
- Released: September 27, 1965 (UK)
- Recorded: February 1 – June 24, 1965
- Genre: Folk; baroque pop
- Length: 32:06
- Label: Columbia Records
- Producer: Lor Crane

Chad & Jeremy chronology
Before and After (1965)	I Don't Want to Lose You Baby (1965)	Distant Shores (1966)

Singles from I Don't Want to Lose You Baby
- 1. "I Don't Want to Lose You, Baby" / "Pennies" Released: 1965; 2. "I Have Dreamed" / "Should I" Released: 1965

I Don't Want to Lose You Baby is the fourth studio album by the English duo Chad & Jeremy. It was released on September 27, 1965. I Don't Want to Lose You Baby was recorded from February 1, 1965 to June 24, 1965. "I Have Dreamed" was released as a single and backed with "Should I". "I Don't Want to Lose You Baby" was also released as a single, and backed with "Pennies", not included on the album.

== Chart performance ==
The album debuted on Billboard magazine's Top LP's chart in the issue dated November 6, 1965, peaking at No. 77 during an eleven-week run on the chart.

== Track listing ==
1. "I Don't Want to Lose You Baby" (Van McCoy) – 2:51
2. "Should I" (Chad Stuart, Jeremy Clyde) – 2:51
3. "The Girl Who Sang the Blues" (Barry Mann, Cynthia Weil) – 2:16
4. "Funny How Love Can Be" (Ken Lewis, John Carter) – 1:50
5. "The Woman in You" (Jeremy Clyde) – 2:34
6. "Mr. Tambourine Man" (Bob Dylan) – 2:25
7. "I Have Dreamed" (Richard Rodgers, Oscar Hammerstein II) – 2:11
8. "Don't Think Twice, It's All Right" (Bob Dylan)– 3:09
9. "Baby Don't Go" (Sonny Bono) - 3:10
10. "There but for Fortune" (Phil Ochs) – 3:14
11. "These Things You Don't Forget" (Van McCoy) - 2:25

== Charts ==
Chart (1965)	Peak position
US Billboard Top LPs	77
