= Aaron Zeitlin =

Jewish American educator and writer

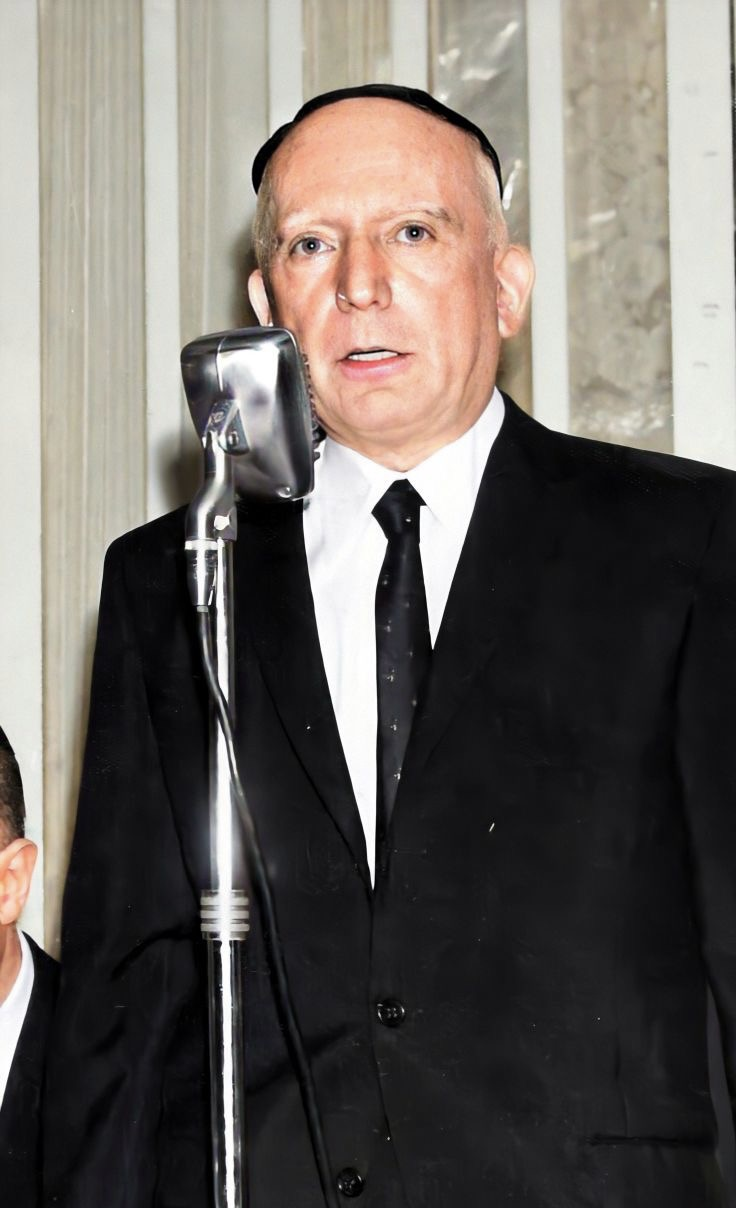
Aaron Zeitlin in 1962

Aaron Zeitlin (3 June 1898 – 28 September 1973) was a Jewish American educator and writer. He authored several books on Yiddish literature, poetry and parapsychology.

== Biography ==
Zeitlin was born in Uvarovichi, Russia (now Belarus) to Hillel Zeitlin and Esther Kunin. He spent his formative years in Gomel and Vilna. In 1920, he and his brother Elchanan traveled to Mandatory Palestine, and in 1921 they returned to Eastern Europe, settling in Warsaw.

Zeitlin's literary abilities were apparent already in his youth when he contributed some articles to the Odessa-based children's journal Perachim and Hashachar.

His first publication was a fictional piece that appeared in the journal Di yidishe velt (די ייִדישע װעלט "The Jewish World"), in 1914. His first published books of Yiddish poetry were Matatron (1922) and Shotns oyfn shney (Shadows on Snow; 1923).

In the 1920s to 1930s, he published short stories, as well as many philosophical and journalistic essays, and pieces of literary and cultural criticism.

In 1939, Zeitlin accepted an invitation from Maurice Schwartz, the director of the Yiddish Art Theatre, to come to New York to work on the company's production of his play Esterke; prevented from returning home by the beginning of the Second World War, Zeitlin settled in New York permanently.

His play Chelmer Chachomim (the title refers to the Wise Men of Chelm) had already opened to critical acclaim at the Yiddish Theatre in New York prior to his arrival, and he slowly became a fixture of the Yiddish scene.

For a time, he was also Professor of Hebrew literature at the Jewish Theological Seminary of America, in New York.

He wrote the famous Yiddish song "Donna Donna", whose music was composed by Sholom Secunda.

In 1969 Zeitlin and Abraham Sutzkever were the first recipients of the Itzik Manger Prize for Yiddish letters.

After WWII, Zeitlin married Rachel Wolfowski, a widow who hailed from Vilna. Her son from her previous marriage was Jewish philanthropist Zev Wolfson.

Zeitlin died in Queens, New York, at the age of 75.

== Published works ==
Ha-meziut ha-aheret (The other Dimension), Tel Aviv: Yavneh, 1967. Parapsychologia murchevet (Expanded Parapsychology), Tel Aviv: Yavneh, 1973. Poems of the Holocaust and Poems of Faith [ed./trans. Morris Faierstein] (iUniverse), 1-217 (122, emended), 2007

== Sources ==
- Alpert, Reuven. Caught In The Crack, Wandering Soul Press, 2002. pp. 151
- Faierstein, Morris M. trans. and Ed., "Poems of the Holocaust and Poems of Faith" By Aaron Zeitlin. iuniverse: New York, 2007.
