= Ann Ronell =

American composer and lyricist (1905–1993)

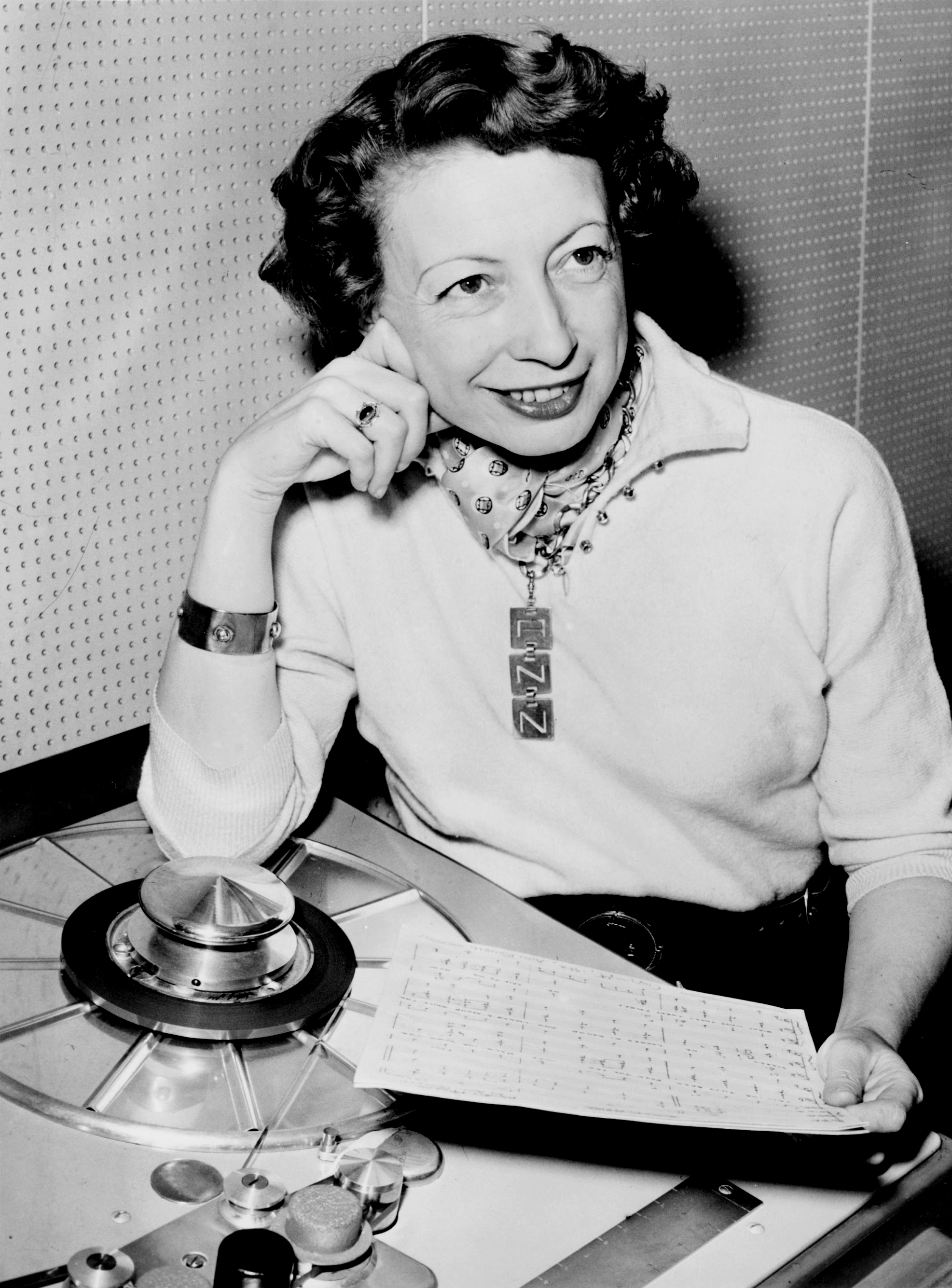
- Ronell in 1953

Background information
- Born: Ann Rosenblatt; December 25, 1905; Omaha, Nebraska, U.S.
- Died: December 25, 1993 (aged 88) New York City, U.S.
- Occupations: Lyricist, composer

Ann Ronell (née Rosenblatt; December 25, 1905 – December 25, 1993) was an American composer and lyricist. She was best known for the standards "Willow Weep for Me" (1932) and "Who's Afraid of the Big Bad Wolf" (1933).

== Early life ==
Ronell was born in Omaha, Nebraska, to Morris and Mollie Rosenblatt, and graduated from Omaha's Central High School in 1923. She enrolled in Wheaton College, in Massachusetts, but transferred after her sophomore year to pursue a serious music education. She graduated from Radcliffe College, where she studied music under Walter Piston. While at Radcliffe, Ronell wrote music for college plays and contributed reviews and interviews to the school's music publication. After interviewing George Gershwin, she struck up a friendship with the composer, who hired her as a rehearsal pianist for his show Rosalie. Gershwin suggested that she change her name from Rosenblatt to Ronell.

== Music career ==
Ronell was, along with Dorothy Fields, Dana Suesse, and Kay Swift, one of the first successful Hollywood and Tin Pan Alley female composers or librettists. In 1929 she put her first song in a show, Down By the River. In 1930, she wrote her first hit, "Baby's Birthday Party." Originally written for a musical, Ronell shopped the song around several music publishers to no avail until Famous Music agreed to publish it. In 1932, she produced the two more songs that gained her notoriety, "Rain on the Roof" and "Willow Weep for Me," the latter of which she dedicated to George Gershwin.

In 1933, Ronell moved to Hollywood. There, she co-wrote Disney's first hit song, "Who's Afraid of the Big Bad Wolf?" with Frank Churchill for the cartoon Three Little Pigs (1933). She was notable for being one of the only composers at the time to handle both music and lyrics.

She wrote the lyrics and music for the Broadway musical Count Me In (1942) She wrote songs for movies including Champagne Waltz (1937) and Blockade (1938) and wrote the scores for movies including the Lester Cowan-produced The Story of G.I. Joe (1945), the film adaptation of the Weill/Nash musical One Touch of Venus (1948), and the Marx Brothers' Love Happy (1949). She served as musical director for Main Street to Broadway (1953). She was nominated for Best Song, "Linda," and with co-composer Louis Applebaum for Best Score, for her work on The Story of G.I. Joe.

== Legacy ==
Ronell's work scoring films was influential in the field. Her score for The Story of G.I. Joe was the first drama to feature a theme song sung over the credits. She was also the first to produce a record from a film score, which she did with Ladies in Retirement. In 1942, Ronell became the first woman to write both the music and lyrics for a broadway show with Count Me In.

"Willow Weep for Me," Ronell's most famous song, has been recorded by such notable artists as Billie Holiday, Cab Calloway, Louis Armstrong and Ella Fitzgerald, Barbra Streisand, Frank Sinatra, Nina Simone, Nancy Wilson, Dinah Washington, Ray Charles, Lena Horne, Julie London, Tony Bennett, Sarah Vaughan, June Christy, and Chad & Jeremy, whose version became a top 20 single hit in 1965. ( Source: Billboard Hot 100 Charts)

== Family ==
She married producer Lester Cowan. The couple had no children.

== Significant songs ==
- "Baby's Birthday Party" (1930)
- "There's A Woman With The Man In The Moon" (1931) (lyric by Lu C Bender)
- "Rain On The Roof" (1932)
- "Willow Weep for Me" (1932)
- "Who's Afraid of the Big Bad Wolf?" (1933)

== Work on Broadway ==
- Count Me In (1942) - revue - composer and lyricist
- The Crucible (1953) - play - composer for the "Lullaby"
- Blues in the Night (1982) - revue - featured songwriter for "Willow Weep for Me"
