= One Day at a Time (Joan Baez album) =

Studio album by Joan Baez
- Released: January 1970
- Recorded: October 1969
- Studios: Bradley's Barn, Mount Juliet, Tennessee
- Genre: Country folk
- Length: 39:04
- Label: Vanguard VSD-79310
- Producer: Maynard Solomon

Joan Baez chronology
David's Album (1969)	One Day at a Time (1970)	The First 10 Years (1970)

Singles from One Day at a Time
- 1. "Sweet Sir Galahad" Released: October 1969

One Day at a Time is the 11th studio album by Joan Baez, released in January 1970. Recorded in Nashville, the album was a continuation of Baez' experimentation with country music, begun with the previous year's David's Album. It is significant in that it was the first to include Baez' own compositions, "Sweet Sir Galahad" and "A Song for David", the former song a ballad for her younger sister Mimi Fariña and the latter for her then-husband, David Harris, at the time in prison as a conscientious objector. One Day at a Time also included work by the Rolling Stones, Willie Nelson, and Pete Seeger.

The album contains four of the songs Baez had performed at Woodstock four months earlier: "(I Live) One Day at a Time," "Joe Hill," "Sweet Sir Galahad," and “Take Me Back to the Sweet Sunny South”.

The Vanguard reissue contains two outtakes from the One Day at a Time sessions, "Sing Me Back Home" and "Mama Tried", both duets with Jeffrey Shurtleff and both Merle Haggard covers. The two tracks had first appeared on Baez' 1993 boxed set Rare, Live & Classic). The recording of "Mama Tried" included an initial aborted take, interrupted when session guitarist Jerry Reed's finger becomes stuck between his guitar strings, followed by laughter by all present at Reed's mishap; the musicians and Baez then regained their composure and performed a second take of the song.

Professional ratings
Review scores
Source	Rating
AllMusic	4.5/5 stars

== Track listing ==
1. "Sweet Sir Galahad" (Joan Baez) – 3:43
2. "No Expectations" (Mick Jagger, Keith Richards) – 3:47
3. "Long Black Veil" (Marijohn Wilkin, Danny Dill) – 3:24
4. "Ghetto" (Homer Banks, Bonnie Bramlett, Bettye Crutcher) – 4:33
5. "Carry It On" (Pete Seeger, Gil Turner) – 2:22
6. "Take Me Back to the Sweet Sunny South" (Traditional) (duet with Jeffrey Shurtleff) – 2:47
7. "Seven Bridges Road" (Steve Young) (duet with Shurtleff) – 3:42
8. "Jolie Blonde" (Traditional) – 2:00
9. "Joe Hill" (Alfred Hayes, Earl Robinson) – 3:25
10. "A Song for David" (Baez) – 4:57
11. "(I Live) One Day at a Time" (Willie Nelson) (duet with Shurtleff) – 3:31

=== Reissue bonus tracks ===
1. "Mama Tried" (Merle Haggard) (duet with Shurtleff) – 3:13
2. "Sing Me Back Home" (Merle Haggard) (duet with Shurtleff) – 2:53

== Personnel ==
- Joan Baez – vocals, guitar
- Pete Drake – pedal steel guitar
- Roy Huskey, Jr. – bass guitar
- Tommy Jackson – fiddle
- Jerry Shook – guitar
- Jerry Reed – guitar
- Harold Bradley – guitar
- Hargus "Pig" Robbins – piano
- Harold Rugg – steel guitar, Dobro
- Grady Martin – guitar, Dobro, sitar
- Buddy Spicher – fiddle
- Norbert Putnam – bass guitar
- Kenny Buttrey – drums
- David Briggs – piano, harpsichord
- Richard Festinger – guitar
- Charlie McCoy – harmonica, vibraphone, organ
- Henry Strzelecki – bass guitar
- Pete Wade – guitar

Technical

- Jim Marshall – photography

== Charts ==
Chart (1971)	Peak position
Canada Top Albums/CDs (RPM)	35
US Billboard 200	80
