= Ring Them Bells (album) =

Live album by Joan Baez
- Released: September 1995
- Recorded: The Bottom Line (live), New York City, April 1995
- Genre: Folk
- Label: Proper
- Producer: Mark Spector

Joan Baez chronology
Rare, Live & Classic (1993)	Ring Them Bells (1995)	Live at Newport (1996)

Professional ratings
Review scores
Source	Rating
AllMusic	3/5 stars

Ring Them Bells is a live album taken from Joan Baez' April 1995 shows at New York's The Bottom Line. In addition to her own solo set, the album featured collaborations with other female artists including Mary Chapin Carpenter, Mimi Fariña, Dar Williams, the Indigo Girls and Mary Black. Though Baez and many of the collaborating artists were admirers of one another, this album marked the first time many of them had worked together. Baez' manager, Mark Spector, served as producer.

In February 2007, Proper Records issued a two-CD "Collectors' edition" with six additional tracks.

== Track listing ==
1. "Lily of the West" (Traditional)
2. "Sweet Sir Galahad" (Joan Baez)
3. "And the Band Played Waltzing Matilda" (Eric Bogle)
4. "Willie Moore" (Joan Baez) (trio with Kate & Anna McGarrigle)
5. "The Swallow Song" (Richard Fariña) (duet with Mimi Fariña)
6. "Don't Make Promises" (Tim Hardin)
7. "Jesse" (Janis Ian) (duet with Janis Ian)
8. "Ring Them Bells" (Bob Dylan) (duet with Mary Black)
9. "Welcome Me" (Amy Ray)
10. "Suzanne" (Leonard Cohen)
11. "You're Aging Well" (Dar Williams) (duet with Dar Williams)
12. "Pajarillo Barranqueño" (Alfonso Esparza Oteo) (duet with Tish Hinojosa)
13. "Don't Think Twice, It's Alright" (Bob Dylan) (trio with the Indigo Girls)
14. "Diamonds & Rust" (Joan Baez) (duet with Mary Chapin Carpenter)
15. "The Night They Drove Old Dixie Down" (a cappella; written by Robbie Robertson)

== Reissue 2007 (with bonus tracks) ==
1. Lily of the West (Traditional)
2. Love Song To A Stranger (Joan Baez)
3. Sweet Sir Galahad (Joan Baez)
4. And the Band Played Waltzing Matilda (Eric Bogle)
5. Willie Moore (Joan Baez) (trio w/Kate & Anna McGarrigle)
6. The Swallow Song (Richard Fariña) (duet w/Mimi Fariña)
7. Don't Make Promises (Tim Hardin)
8. Jesse (Janis Ian) (duet with Janis Ian)
9. Ring Them Bells (Bob Dylan) (duet with Mary Black)
10. Welcome Me (Amy Ray)
11. Geordie (Traditional)
12. You Ain't Goin' Nowhere (Bob Dylan)
13. Suzanne (Leonard Cohen)
14. You're Aging Well (Dar Williams) (duet with Dar Williams)
15. Pajarillo Barranqueño (duet with Tish Hinojosa; written by Alfonso Esparza Oteo)
16. Gracias a la vida (Violeta Parra)
17. The Water Is Wide (Traditional) (trio with the Indigo Girls)
18. Don't Think Twice, It's Alright (Bob Dylan) (trio with the Indigo Girls)
19. Stones in the Road (Mary Chapin Carpenter) (duet with Mary Chapin Carpenter)
20. Diamonds & Rust (Joan Baez) (duet with Mary Chapin Carpenter)
21. The Night They Drove Old Dixie Down (a cappella; written by Robbie Robertson)

== Personnel ==
- Paul Pesco - guitar, vocals
- Fernando Saunders - bass, vocals
- Carol Steele - percussion, vocals
- Janis Ian - piano, vocals (track 7 only)
- Pat Crowley (member of Mary Black's band) - piano (track 8 only)
- Amy Ray (Indigo Girls) - acoustic guitar, vocals (track 13 & bonus 17 only)
- Emily Saliers (Indigo Girls) - acoustic guitar, vocals (track 13 & bonus 17 only)
- Mary Chapin Carpenter - acoustic guitar, vocals (track 14 & bonus 19)
