= Carry It On =

- CD reissue slipcase cover

Soundtrack album by Joan Baez
- Released: 1971
- Genre: Folk, Country Folk
- Label: Vanguard VSD-79313
- Producer: Christopher Knight

Joan Baez chronology
The First 10 Years (1970)	Carry It On (1971)	Blessed Are... (1971)

Professional ratings
Review scores
Source	Rating
Allmusic	2.5/5 stars

Carry It On is the first soundtrack album (and thirteenth overall) by Joan Baez to the documentary film of the same name, released in 1971. Its title is taken from one of its songs, "Carry It On", which was written by Gil Turner.

The film chronicles the events taking place in the months immediately before the incarceration of Joan's husband at the time, David Harris, in 1969.

== Track listing ==
1. "Oh Happy Day" (Edwin Hawkins) – 3:43
2. "Carry It On" (Gil Turner) – 3:48
3. "In Forty Days" ("Joan & David") – 3:22
4. "Hickory Wind" (Gram Parsons, Bob Buchanan) – 3:16
5. "The Last Thing on My Mind" (Tom Paxton) – 3:29
6. "Life Is Sacred" (David) – 2:02
7. "Joe Hill" (Robinson, Hayes) – 3:53
8. "I Shall Be Released" (Dylan) – 3:33
9. "Do Right Woman, Do Right Man" (assisted by Jeffrey Shurtleff) (Dan Penn, Chips Moman) – 4:21
10. "Love Is Just A Four-Letter Word" (Bob Dylan) – 4:05
11. "Suzanne" (Leonard Cohen) – 4:54
12. "Idols and Heroes" (David) – 2:30
13. "We Shall Overcome" (Horton, Frank Hamilton, Guy Carawan, Pete Seeger) – 4:45

== Personnel ==
- Joan Baez – Guitar, Vocals
- Georgette Cartwright – Creative Services Coordinator
- Richard Festinger – Guitar
- Bob Fitch – Photography
- Jules Halfant – Art Direction
- Dave Harris – Vocals, Performer
- David Harris – Performer
- Arthur Levy – Liner Notes
- Norman Moore – Art Direction, Design
- Mark Spector – Reissue Producer
- Captain Jeff Zaraya – Engineer
