= The First Ten Years (Joan Baez album) =

The First 10 Years

Greatest hits album by Joan Baez
- Released: October 1970
- Genre: Folk
- Length: 70:00
- Label: Vanguard VSD-6560/1
- Producer: Maynard Solomon

Joan Baez chronology
| One Day at a Time (1970) | The First 10 Years (1970) | Carry It On (1971) |

The First Ten Years is the second compilation album by Joan Baez, released in October 1970. It rounds up highlights of her first decade with the Vanguard label.

It was her first "official" compilation, and includes material ranging from her early 1960s traditional folk, through her Bob Dylan and Phil Ochs covers, to her later experiments with classical orchestration and country music. Originally released on vinyl as a two-record set, the 1987 CD reissue consolidated the album onto a single disc, omitting five songs.

The cover photo was taken by rock photographer Jim Marshall. Inside the original gatefold album on the original vinyl release was a photo montage of images from Baez' career.

Professional ratings
Review scores
| Source | Rating |
|---|---|
| Allmusic | link |

== Track listing ==
1. "Ghetto" (Homer Banks, Bonnie Bramlett, Bettye Crutcher)
2. "If I Were a Carpenter" (Tim Hardin)
3. "Silver Dagger" (Traditional)*
4. "Love Is Just A Four-Letter Word" (Bob Dylan)
5. "There But for Fortune" (Phil Ochs)
6. "Will the Circle Be Unbroken" (Traditional)*
7. "John Riley" (Traditional, arr. by Ricky Neff)
8. "You Ain't Goin' Nowhere" (Dylan)
9. "Mary Hamilton" (Traditional)
10. "Carry It On" (Gil Turner)*
11. "Manhã de Carnaval" (Luiz Bonfá)
12. "If I Knew" (Nina Duschek, Pauline Marden)
13. "With God on Our Side" (Dylan)
14. "Don't Think Twice, It's Alright" (Dylan)
15. "Geordie" (Traditional)
16. "Te Ador" (Traditional)
17. "Green, Green Grass of Home" (Curly Putman)*
18. "No Expectations" (Mick Jagger, Keith Richards)
19. "Sweet Sir Galahad" (Joan Baez)
20. "Turquoise" (Donovan)
21. "Farewell, Angelina" (Dylan)
22. "London" (William Blake)/Old Welsh Song (Henry Treece)*
23. "A Hard Rain's A-Gonna Fall" (Dylan)

The CD reissue did not include the following tracks: "Silver Dagger", "Will The Circle Be Unbroken", "Carry It On", "Green, Green Grass Of Home", and "London/Old Welsh Song".

== Charts ==
| Chart (1970–71) | Peak position |
|---|---|
| Canada Top Albums/CDs (RPM) | 37 |
| UK Albums (Official Charts) | 41 |
| US Billboard 200 | 73 |
