= David's Album =

Studio album by Joan Baez
- Released: May 1969
- Recorded: September 1968
- Studios: Columbia (Nashville, Tennessee)
- Genres: Folk, country
- Length: 36:45
- Label: Vanguard VSD-79308
- Producer: Maynard Solomon

Joan Baez chronology
| Any Day Now (1968) | David's Album (1969) | One Day at a Time (1970) |

David's Album is the tenth studio album by Joan Baez, recorded in Nashville and released in 1969. It peaked at number 36 on the Billboard Pop Albums chart.

== History ==
Baez's then husband, David Harris, a country music fan, was about to be imprisoned for draft resistance, and she recorded the album as a gift to him. It was recorded during the same sessions as Baez's previous release of Bob Dylan songs, Any Day Now.

The cover sketch is a drawing of Harris by Baez.

The Vanguard reissue contains two previously unreleased tracks, "How Can I Miss You", a duet with Baez' sister Mimi Fariña, and Tom Paxton's "The Last Thing on My Mind."

== Reception ==
Professional ratings
Review scores
| Source | Rating |
|---|---|
| AllMusic | 4/5 stars |

In his AllMusic review, music critic Bruce Eder wrote that "the singing and playing still hold up. Baez also sets aside some of her occasional stridency here, in favor of a more relaxed performance that shows her in the most engaging manner of her career... David's Album has transcended its origins in part because of the sheer range of material on it... David Harris is long since out of jail, and he and Baez parted, but it's still an excellent album."

== Track listing ==
=== Side one ===
1. "If I Knew" (Nina Dusheck, lyrics; Pauline Marden)
2. "Rock Salt and Nails" (Bruce Utah Phillips)
3. "Glad Bluebird of Happiness" (Darryl Skrabak)
4. "Green, Green Grass of Home" (Curly Putman)
5. "Will the Circle be Unbroken" (Charles H. Gabriel, Ada R. Habershon)

=== Side two ===
1. "The Tramp on the Street" (Lyrics by Grady Cole and Hazel Cole with a substituted final verse)
2. "Poor Wayfaring Stranger" (Traditional)
3. "Just a Closer Walk with Thee" (Traditional)
4. "Hickory Wind" (Gram Parsons, Bob Buchanan)
5. "My Home's Across the Blue Ridge Mountains" (A.P. Carter, Tom Ashley)

=== Reissue bonus tracks ===
1. "How Can I Miss You" (Dan Hicks)
2. "The Last Thing on My Mind" (Tom Paxton)

== Personnel ==
- Joan Baez – vocals, guitar
- Fred Carter Jr. – mandolin
- Pete Drake – pedal steel guitar
- Johnny Gimble – fiddle
- Roy Huskey Jr. – bass
- Tommy Jackson – fiddle
- Jerry Kennedy – guitar
- Jerry Reed – guitar
- Harold Bradley – guitar, Dobro
- Hargus "Pig" Robbins – piano
- Harold Rugg – guitar, Dobro
- Grady Martin – guitar
- Buddy Spicher – fiddle
- Norbert Putnam – bass
- Kenny Buttrey – drums

== Chart positions ==
| Chart (1969) | Peak position |
|---|---|
| Canada Top Albums/CDs (RPM) | 33 |
| US Billboard 200 | 36 |
