= People's Songs =

- Editor: Pete Seeger
- Categories: Music magazines Folk music
- Frequency: quarterly
- Founder: Pete Seeger
- First issue: February 1946
- Final issue: 1950
- Company: People's Songs Inc.
- Country: United States
- Language: English

People's Songs was an organization founded by Pete Seeger, Alan Lomax, Lee Hays, and others on December 31, 1945, in New York City, to "create, promote, and distribute songs of labor and the American people." The organization published a quarterly Bulletin from 1946 through 1950, featuring stories, songs and writings of People's singers members. People's Songs Bulletin served as a template for folk music magazines to come like Sing Out! and Broadside.

== History ==
Seeger's work with the Almanac Singers and trips around the country playing banjo for Congress of Industrial Organizations (CIO) benefits and other progressive organizations in the 1940s cemented his beliefs that folk music could be an effective force for social change. He conceived creating an organization to better disseminate songs for political action to Labor and other progressive organizations around the country. These plans were put on hold as Seeger was drafted into the army during World War II. Upon his discharge from the Army in 1946, Seeger finally got a chance to realize his plans, and convened a group of interested people for a meeting in the basement of his in-laws' apartment in Greenwich Village. People's Songs' founding committee included several former members of the Almanac Singers and other notable members of the folk community in New York and included Woody Guthrie, Lee Hays, Horace Grenell, Anges "Sis" Cunningham, Burl Ives, Millard Lampell, Alan Lomax, Bess Lomax Hawes, Josh White. and Tom Glazer. Also attending the first meeting were, Jackie Gibson, Ronnie Gilbert, Irwin Silber and David Sear. They elected Pete Seeger president and Lee Hays executive secretary and collected money to rent a small office located at 130 West 42nd Street, New York, NY, which also housed shared a radical drama group Stage for Action. Corporate counsel was Joseph R. Brodsky.

The organization was loosely modeled as an American version Great Britain's Workers Music Association, founded 10 years earlier than People's Songs. It published out a weekly newsletter with songs, articles, and announcements of Hootenannies and folk dances. It served as a clearing house for progressive entertainers. There were also occasional special issues with relevant songs on an as needed basis geared for specific rallies, strike, and court cases. Soon the booking agency became an offshoot: People's Artists.

People's Songs branched out into several satellite locations in addition to the New York offices. A yearly convention was held as a place to exchange ideas and play songs. The first People's Songs convention was held in 1947 in Chicago, and there was a branch in California headed by Mario Casetta, an army friend of Seeger's from Saipan, who became a key figure in the West Coast folk and world music scene.

In its first year People's Songs met with success, but this was a trying time for the labor movements in the United States, which had a significant Communist presence since its inception. After World War II, the Communist Party of the United States became much more dogmatic than formerly, and was indifferent to the use of folk music. There was also not much call for new organizing or singing in the streets, as established unions tried to consolidate their gains. In addition, there was a conservative majority in Congress, which opposed the labor movement altogether and was adamantly committed to maintaining racial segregation in the South. Eager to reverse the social legislation of President Franklin D. Roosevelt's New Deal, it passed the Taft-Hartley act (over Harry S. Truman's veto). Some scholars believe that President Truman himself instituted loyalty oaths and mass firings, in order to preempt conservative criticism, control public opinion, and forestall any opposition to his Marshall Plan and to a military build-up from the left wing of his party. As the Red Scare gathered momentum, the House Un-American Activities Committee held hearings into supposed subversive activity in the entertainment industry. People's Songs began to falter financially. In 1948 it put all its resources into the presidential campaign of Henry A. Wallace, and when that failed everywhere but in New York City, People's Songs went bankrupt, although its booking agency, People's Artists, continued for a while. After the financial failure of People's Songs in 1948, Seeger and Silber put out an interim People's Songs newsletter and then went on to form the more durable Sing Out! magazine with a similar format.

== The Newsletter ==
The people are on the march and must have songs to sing. Now in 1946, the truth must reassert itself in many singing voices. There are thousands of unions, people's organizations, singers and choruses who would gladly use more songs. There are many songwriters, amateur and professional, who are writing these songs. It is clear that there must be an organization to make and send songs of labor and the American people through the land. To do this job we formed People's Songs. INC We invite your to join us.

— Pete Seeger, Introduction of People's Songs newsletter No. 1

The People's Songs was a small mimeographed magazine published quarterly from February 1946 to 1950. The first issue of the People's Songs was published February 1946 to a circulation of 3000 countrywide. Its musical editor was Waldemar Hille. The first issue featured a selection of seven Union songs widely ranging from traditional songs like Casey Jones, to standards by Joe Hill, to international songs from Spanish soldiers and new songs by contemporary folk musicians like Lee Hays and Woody Guthrie. This was a format the magazine would follow throughout its years of publication. The songs were numbered to maintain sequence from the first issue continuing through each issue, for example the first issue contained seven songs, and the first song in the second issue was numbered 8. People's Songs served as a template for folk music magazines to come like Sing Out and Broadside.

=== Contributors to People's Songs Newsletter ===
People's Songs contained a lot of written out sheet music, lyrics and tablature. It was an eclectic mix of traditional folk and union songs along with newly written pieces by contemporary folk musicians of the time. Some contributors include the following:

- Moe Asch
- Anges "Sis" Cunningham,
- Tom Glazer
- Woody Guthrie
- Lee Hays
- Waldemar Hille
- Zilphia Horton
- Burl Ives
- Millard Lampell
- Pete Seeger
- Irwin Silber
- Sonny Terry
- Josh White

The entire backfile of People's Songs was microfilmed in the 1980s by Clearwater Publishing Inc. from Pete Seeger's personal copy, including his personal commentaries. Clearwater Publishing (not related to the Sloop Clearwater) was acquired by Congressional Information Service in 1987, which was a subsidiary of Reed-Elsevier, an international publishing conglomerate. In 2010 Reed-Elsevier sold all its microfilm titles, including People's Songs, Broadside magazine, and New City Songstore, a British folkmusic newsletter published by Peggy Seeger, to ProQuest/CSA.
