= Where Are You Now, My Son? =

Studio album by Joan Baez
- Released: March 1973
- Recorded: Hanoi, Vietnam: December 18–27, 1972; Nashville: January 1973
- Genre: Folk
- Length: 44:42
- Label: A&M
- Producer: Joan Baez, Norbert Putnam, Henry Lewy

Joan Baez chronology
Come from the Shadows (1972)	Where Are You Now, My Son? (1973)	Gracias a la Vida (1974)

Where Are You Now, My Son? is the fourteenth studio album (and sixteenth overall) by Joan Baez, released in 1973. One side of the album featured recordings Baez made during a US bombing raid on Hanoi over Christmas 1972. Included on the recording are the voices of Barry Romo, Michael Allen and human rights attorney Telford Taylor, with whom Baez made her famous 1972 visit to North Vietnam.

Baez also recorded a version of this song in which her spoken words and lyrics were in French. The French version was included in an album published in 1974 with the title bien sûr la guerre est finie. The rest of the songs are the same as those on the English language versions.

The album's other side, featuring songs written by Baez, Mimi Fariña, and Hoyt Axton, was recorded in Nashville in January 1973.

From the album's liner notes:

... The war in Indochina is not yet over, and the war against violence has barely begun ...

— Joan Baez

== Critical reception ==
Professional ratings
Review scores
Source	Rating
AllMusic	3/5 stars
The Encyclopedia of Popular Music	2/5 stars
The Rolling Stone Album Guide	2/5 stars

AllMusic called "A Young Gypsy" "one of Baez's best original songs."

== Track listing ==
All tracks composed by Joan Baez, except where indicated.

1. "Only Heaven Knows" – 2:35
2. "Less Than the Song" (Hoyt Axton) – 3:27
3. "A Young Gypsy" – 3:36
4. "Mary Call" (Mimi Fariña) – 3:34
5. "Rider, Pass By" – 4:13
6. "Best of Friends" (Mimi Fariña) – 3:03
7. "Windrose" – 3:42 (On 1980 stereo vinyl reissue by Pickwick Records SPC-3748, this track is excluded)
8. "Where Are You Now, My Son?" – 21:42

== Personnel ==
- Joan Baez – vocals, guitar

== Chart positions ==
Year	Chart	Position
1973	Billboard 200	138

== See also ==
- List of anti-war songs
