= Gil Turner =

American singer-songwriter (1933–1974)

- Born: Gilbert Strunk; May 6, 1933; Bridgeport, Connecticut, US
- Died: September 23, 1974 (aged 41) San Francisco, California, US
- Genres: Folk, protest music
- Occupations: Singer-songwriter, editor, actor
- Instruments: Vocals, 5-string banjo, 12-string guitar
- Years active: 1950s–1974
- Labels: Folkways, Atlantic, Broadside, Smithsonian Folkways

Gil Turner (born Gilbert Strunk; May 6, 1933 – September 23, 1974) was an American folk singer-songwriter, magazine editor, Shakespearean actor, political activist, and for a time, a lay Baptist preacher. Turner was a prominent figure in the Greenwich Village scene of the early 1960s, where he was master of ceremonies at New York City's leading folk music venue, Gerde's Folk City, as well as co-editor of the protest song magazine Broadside. He also wrote for Sing Out!, the quarterly folk music journal.

Turner was a founding member of The New World Singers in 1962 with Happy Traum and Bob Cohen. His most notable musical credit, however, was his association with Bob Dylan's "Blowin' in the Wind". He was both the first person to perform the song – at Gerde's on April 16, 1962, the night Dylan completed it – and with The New World Singers, the first to record it.

Turner wrote more than 100 songs. His best known include "Benny 'Kid' Paret", a protest song about a boxer who died in the ring, and "Carry It On", a Civil Rights anthem recorded by folk artists such as Judy Collins and Joan Baez. The song's title was used as the name of a 1970 documentary starring Baez and her husband at the time, draft resister David Harris.

== Background ==
Turner was born on May 6, 1933, in Bridgeport, Connecticut, the son of a machinist. His father, a German immigrant, was a member of a Bridgeport singing group that toured the US twice, and his mother, a member of the church choir. Besides their musical talent, Turner inherited his parents' love of religion, and as a teen, he became a lay preacher.

Turner attended the University of Bridgeport as a Political Science major and later, the Columbia School of Social Work, where he was trained to work with autistic children. In papers he wrote, Turner explored how music might be used to treat children with autism as well as patients with rheumatoid arthritis, a disease he suffered from that in time would partially cripple him.

After meeting folksinger Pete Seeger, Turner gave up the church to pursue, as his friend writer Robert Shelton described it, folk music's "larger pastorate". In the fall of 1961, Turner became emcee at Gerde's Folk City at Fourth and Mercer Streets near Greenwich Village's northeast corner. His position at Gerde's, which featured both established artists and emerging talent, put Turner at the center of the Village's burgeoning folk music scene.

== Broadside and Bob Dylan ==
When Seeger, Agnes "Sis" Cunningham and her husband Gordon Friesen were considering launching a magazine devoted to protest songs, Turner became the key to the enterprise. Through his role at Gerde's, Turner rounded up contributors of protest songs for Broadside during its first few years, many of them young songwriters like Phil Ochs, Bonnie Dobson, Len Chandler and Mark Spoelstra.

One of the up-and-comers Turner brought around was Bob Dylan. Dylan, who had arrived in the Village in January 1961, signed with Columbia Records nine months later, around the time Turner was hired at Gerde's. The two became close friends and frequently hung out at taverns after Gerde's closed for the night. During one of their after-midnight sessions, Turner laid out the concept behind Broadside for Dylan, recruiting him as one of the magazine's first contributors. Not long afterwards, Seeger took Dylan to meet Cunningham and Friesen at a get-together at their apartment. When the debut issue of Broadside came out the next month, February 1962, among the five songs featured were Dylan's "Talkin' John Birch Paranoid Blues" and a protest song of Turner's, "Carlino".

== "Blowin' in the Wind" ==
On April 16, 1962, Dylan showed up at Gerde's at a hootenanny Turner was hosting. He wrote a new song called "Blowin' in the Wind" and wanted Turner to hear it. After listening to Dylan play the song in the club's basement, Turner had Dylan show him the chords. When he went up upstairs for his next set, Turner sang the song from Dylan's rough manuscript. It was the first performance of what went on to become one of the most famous folk-protest songs of the 1960s.

"Blowin' in the Wind" appeared on the cover of Broadside two issues later, the song's first publication. In July, Dylan recorded the song for his second album, Freewheelin' Bob Dylan, but it would be another year before the album's release. Meanwhile, Turner's group The New World Singers recorded the song for Broadside Ballads, Vol. 1, a collection of songs that had appeared in the magazine. This recording, the song's first release, came five months before Freewheelin's and six months before the hit single by Peter, Paul & Mary.

== Personal life ==
Turner married Lori Singer in 1962. Their daughter, Melora Lou NuCeder (née Turner), was born in 1965. Turner and Singer divorced in 1967.

== Discography ==
- The New World Singers - The New World Singers (Atlantic, 1963)

Compilations

- Broadside Ballads, Vol. 1 (Folkways, 1963) (Broadside, 1964)
- Sum Her Path Hymn Vol. 7 (Not On Label, 1993)
- The Best Of Broadside 1962-1988 (Smithsonian Folkways, 2000)
