= Sweet Sir Galahad =

Single by Joan Baez

from the album One Day at a Time
- B-side: "Long Black Veil"
- Released: October 1969
- Recorded: September 1969
- Studio: Bradley's Barn, Mount Juliet, Tennessee
- Genre: Folk
- Length: 3:26
- Label: Vanguard (UK); Vanguard (US)
- Songwriter: Joan Baez
- Producers: Maynard Solomon; Joan Baez

Joan Baez singles chronology
"Love Is Just a Four-Letter Word" (1968)	"Sweet Sir Galahad" (1969)	"The Night They Drove Old Dixie Down" (1971)

"Sweet Sir Galahad" is a song written by Joan Baez. Baez debuted the song in an episode of The Smothers Brothers Comedy Hour on March 30, 1969, and later performed it at the Woodstock Festival in August 1969. A recording of the song, first released as a single in late 1969, would lead off Baez's 1970 album One Day at a Time.

== History ==
The song tells the story of Baez's younger sister Mimi Fariña and her marriage (her second) to music producer Milan Melvin. (Mimi's first husband Richard Fariña had died in a motorcycle accident two years previously.) Mimi and Milan were married at the 1968 Big Sur Folk Festival. Baez was inspired to write the song after hearing of Melvin's courtship of Fariña, during which he came into her bedroom at night through a window.

In her 1987 memoir And a Voice to Sing With, Baez described "Sweet Sir Galahad" as the first song she ever wrote (although she is credited as a co-writer on two tracks on her 1967 album Joan).

Mimi Fariña and Milan Melvin divorced in 1971 and Mimi died in 2001. In 2006, Baez contributed a "re-tooled" version of the song to Volume 1 of the XM Artist Confidential CD series. In the new version, Baez changed the lyric "Here's to the dawn of their days" to "Here's to the dawn of her days."

A live version of the song appears as a bonus track on the 2006 reissue of Baez's 1995 album Ring Them Bells.
