= Charlie McCoy =

American musician

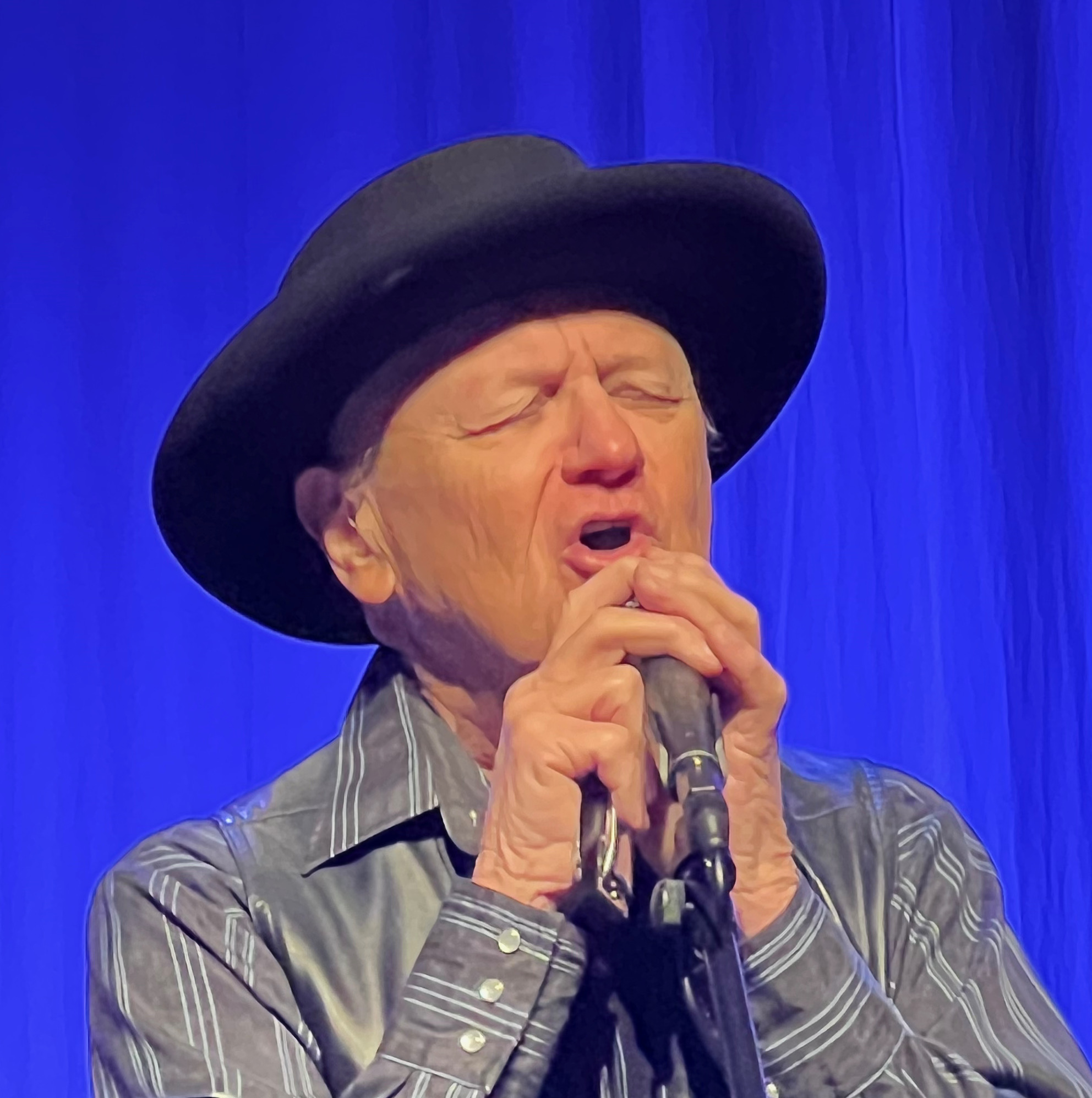
- McCoy performing in 2023

Background information
- Born: Charles Ray McCoy; March 28, 1941 (age 85); Oak Hill, West Virginia, U.S.
- Genres: Country
- Occupations: Singer, musician
- Instruments: Harmonica, trumpet, guitar, bass, vocals
- Years active: 1961–present
- Labels: Monument, Step One, Koch

Charles Ray McCoy (born March 28, 1941) is an American harmonicist and multi-instrumentalist. He is best known for his harmonica solos on iconic recordings such as "Candy Man" (Roy Orbison), "He Stopped Loving Her Today" (George Jones), "I Was Country When Country Wasn't Cool" (Barbara Mandrell), and others. He was a member of the progressive country rock bands Area Code 615 and Barefoot Jerry. After recording with Bob Dylan in New York, McCoy is credited for unknowingly influencing Dylan to decide to come to Nashville to record the critically acclaimed 1966 album Blonde on Blonde.

A prolific session musician, McCoy performed on many recordings by established artists, including Elvis Presley (on eight of his film sound tracks), Bob Dylan, Johnny Cash, Chet Atkins, Waylon Jennings, Roy Orbison, Leon Russell, and Loretta Lynn. In the recording industry, he was known as the "utility man" because of his ability to play with sufficient skill on many different instruments in addition to the harmonica; for example, he played trumpet on Dylan's "Rainy Day Women ♯12 & 35", saxophone on Roy Orbison's "Oh, Pretty Woman", and bass harmonica on Simon and Garfunkel's "The Boxer". On Elvis Presley's 1965 soundtrack album Harum Scarum, he played guitar, harmonica, organ, and vibraphone.

He is a member of three halls of fame, including the Country Music Hall of Fame and the West Virginia Music Hall of Fame; he was inducted into the Musicians Hall of Fame and Museum in 2007 as a part of a group of session musicians dubbed "The Nashville A-Team". For 19 years, McCoy worked as music director for Nashville's popular television show, Hee Haw. In 2022, he became a member of the Grand Ole Opry. His memoir, Fifty Cents and a Box Top– The Creative Life of Nashville Session Musician Charlie McCoy, was published in 2017.

== Early life ==
McCoy was born in Oak Hill, West Virginia, United States. His family moved to nearby Fayetteville when he was a boy and then to Miami, Florida. In 1949, at age 8, McCoy saw an advertisement in a comic book, that read: "Learn to play harmonica in seven days or your money back." It required a box top from a cereal product plus 50 cents. When the instrument arrived, McCoy found it hard to get any music out of it, and lost interest. Later, he moved to Florida to live with his father. On unpacking his suitcase, his father saw the harmonica. To McCoy's surprise, his dad picked it up and played "Home Sweet Home", both the melody and his own rhythmic accompaniment. This was the first time anyone had shown him how the instrument is properly played. McCoy was amazed, and a spark was struck. He soon learned to play four songs that he performed at his elementary school assembly. As he got older, he devoted himself to learning blues harmonica by listening to late-night radio broadcasts originating out of Nashville's WLAC. He acquired records of the great blues harmonica players by mail-order. He also learned to play the guitar, and in his teens, the bass and trumpet. While attending Southwest Miami high school, he put together a rock and roll band called "Charlie McCoy and the Agendas" as a guitarist and singer. At age sixteen he accompanied a friend to a Miami-based country music barn dance radio show called the "Old South Jamboree". Upon their arrival, McCoy's friend left him in the crowd and went to talk to "Happy" Harold Thaxton, the host of the show, with the intention of coaxing the reluctant McCoy up on stage to sing. McCoy's performance that night, along with the positive response from the audience, led to the band, Charlie McCoy and the Agendas, being signed to the Old South Jamboree. The band consisted of the following players: Donny Lytle, later known as Johnny Paycheck (bass); Bill Johnson (steel guitar); Charlie Justice (guitar); and Bill Phillips (vocals). Around the same time, the band also took part in a local rock and roll contest, winning first prize.

== Development ==
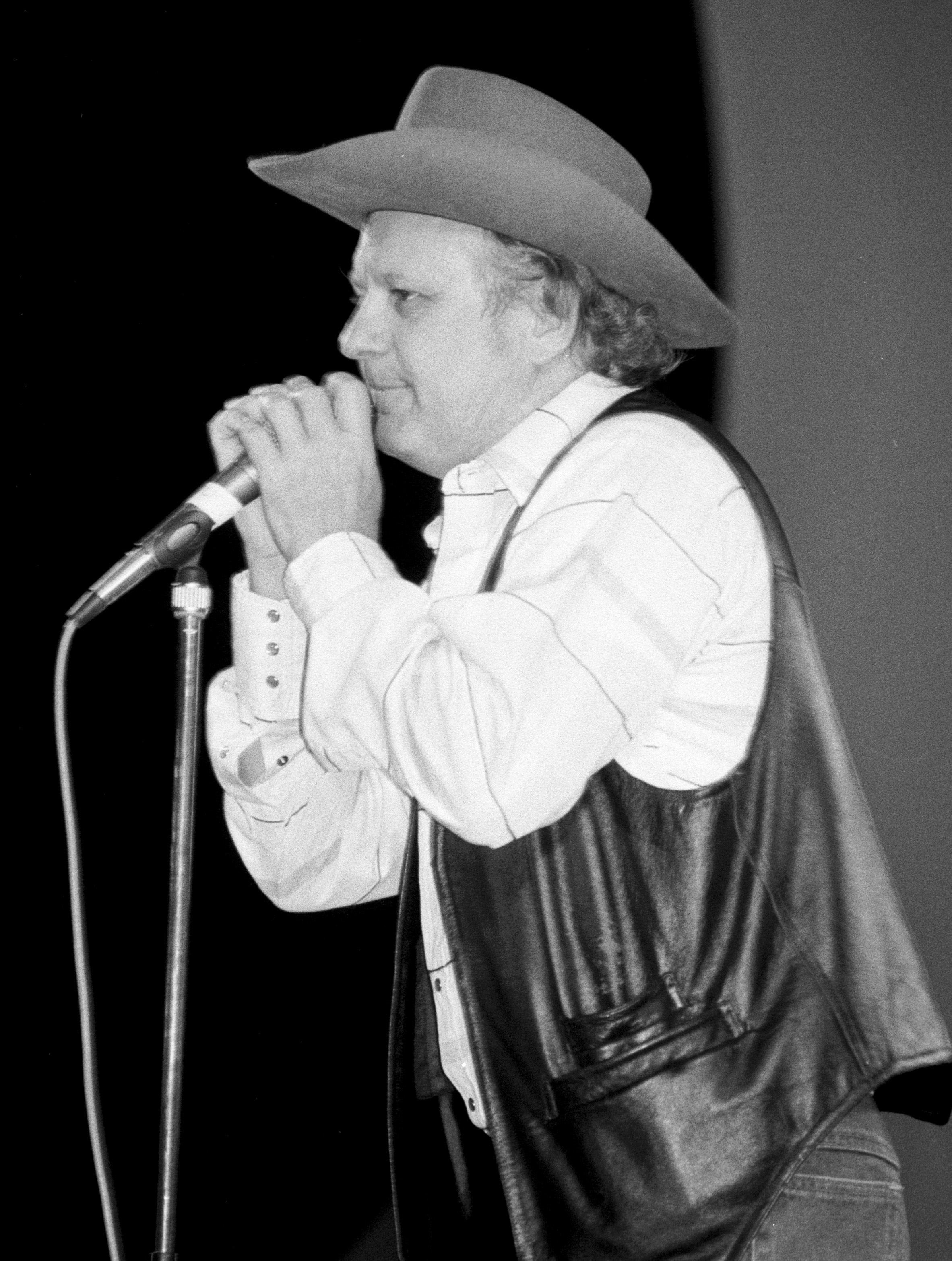
McCoy performing in Normandy, France, 1990

Following an invitation from Mel Tillis, the eighteen-year-old McCoy went to Nashville, for a week's stay in 1959. During his visit he contacted numerous producers and record companies but to no avail. Discouraged, he returned to Miami. He enrolled at University of Miami, majoring in musical education. His goal then was to become a music teacher. Meanwhile, he continued to perform on the "Jamboree". When the university's music faculty discovered that he was playing rock and roll for a square dance, they warned him not to continue with such "lower forms of music". McCoy replied that he was willing to quit his work at the barn dance if they would give him a scholarship. The faculty rejected his request.

McCoy, who still wanted to make a career in music, decided to return to Nashville, a difficult decision, because it meant quitting college, and would disappoint his father. Nevertheless, he applied for a job in Nashville as guitarist in Johny Ferguson's band. But when he arrived there, his job had already been taken. Ferguson felt bad about this, and decided to hire McCoy as a drummer instead. Unfortunately for McCoy, he had only rudimentary knowledge of drumming, but was desperate for a job. He bought a drum set and joined the group; they were not well-received, and disbanded shortly thereafter their first job. McCoy said, "Even though I was still learning to play the drums, I wasn't the worst musician in the group". After a month of unemployment he joined Stonewall Jackson as a drummer. The job came to an end in the autumn that year. He then received a call from the booking agent Jim Denney, who informed him that Archie Bleyer of Cadence Records had listened to McCoy's tapes and wanted to sign him. McCoy cut his first single, "Cherry Berry Wine", for the Cadence label; it reached No. 99 on the Billboard chart. In Nashville, Denney advised him to do demo sessions and to concentrate on the harmonica. Next, McCoy joined Wayne Moss as a bass player, performing at Fort Campbell in Kentucky.

== Big break ==
Chet Atkins heard one of McCoy's demo tapes and immediately hired him as a staff musician in May, 1961. His first recording session for RCA as a harmonica player was with an unknown singer from Sweden named Ann-Margret. He accompanied her on the song "I Just Don't Understand" Fred Foster of Monument Records then booked McCoy for McCoy's second session, this time with Roy Orbison, which included the song, "Candy Man". As the veteran musicians were tuning up, Orbison sang the song for them, accompanying himself on guitar. He said they needed to come up with an intro. McCoy immediately had an idea, but remained silent. Nothing was happening, the clock was ticking, and no one had anything. Finally, he played a motif quietly for veteran session guitarist, Harold Bradley, who said, "Hey guys, Charlie has a great idea." When the song became a million-seller, McCoy's performance drew notice by the music executives. He said, “After the song hit the radio, my phone started ringing ... and thank God, 61-years later, it's still ringing.” He continued to record for the Monument label without a written contract. His ability to give a creditable performance on many different instruments made him a good man to have on any session, and he became known as the "Utility Man" by producers.

Although some of his singles and albums at this time did not sell, Foster believed in McCoy's music. Tex Davis, the promoter for Monument Records, was persuaded by Charlie Dillard of WPFA to release "Today I Started Loving You Again" from McCoy's second LP as a single. When it came out in 1972 it sold 750 000 copies and went to No. 16 in the Billboard country charts. His next album, The Real McCoy, won a Grammy at the 15th Annual Grammy Awards from the National Academy of Recording Arts and Sciences. His album Good Time Charlie reached No. 1 in the Billboard country chart. He has won two CMA Awards and seven ACM Awards.

== The Dylan connection ==
McCoy was visiting in New York in 1965; his friend and producer, Bob Johnston, mentioned that he was producing a Bob Dylan session, and he invited McCoy to come and meet Dylan. They were recording tracks for the upcoming album. "Highway 61 Revisited". After the introduction, McCoy was surprised when Dylan said that he personally owned one of McCoy's records, "Harpoon Man". Then Dylan said, "Hey, I'm getting ready to record a song, why don't you grab that guitar and play along." The song was "Desolation Row", and McCoy remembered that it was 11 minutes long. It took only two takes. The success of this impromptu session is credited in part with Dylan later agreeing to come to Nashville to record, and doing so against the wishes of his label and management executives. Several months later, McCoy got a call that Dylan was indeed coming to Nashville, and a date had been set. McCoy would be the session leader and was tasked with picking the musicians. It was a big deal back then, because Nashville's connection for recording with folk singers was not stellar.

In 1966, Dylan recorded Blonde on Blonde in Nashville, his seventh studio album, a double LP. McCoy brought Kenny Buttrey and Wayne Moss, Hargus Robbins, Jerry Kennedy, Henry Strzelecki, Joe South, and Wayne Butler. Dylan brought Robbie Robertson and Al Kooper. One session was booked for 2 pm, but Dylan did not arrive until 6 pm; he said he had not finished writing the first song. They ended the song "Sad-Eyed Lady of the Lowlands" at 4 am. McCoy said the album took 39 hours to record, "an eternity by Nashville standards".

Critics called Blonde on Blonde "a benchmark in American Music". In 2003, it was ranked number nine on Rolling Stone magazine's list of "The 500 Greatest Albums of All Time". McCoy said, "There were no folk-rock people performing here [Nashville] before Blonde on Blonde; and after that came out, it was like the floodgates opened...It was Joan Baez, Buffy Sainte-Marie, The Byrds, and Leonard Cohen."

Dylan returned to Nashville to Columbia Studios in late 1967 to record John Wesley Harding, with McCoy playing bass. Dylan's third Nashville session was Nashville Skyline again featuring McCoy. Johnny Cash also performed on the album.

== Success ==
McCoy went on to record with many other artists including Elvis Presley, Perry Como, Gordon Lightfoot, Joan Baez, Steve Miller Band, Johnny Cash, Roy Clark, Buffy Sainte-Marie, Kris Kristofferson, Paul Simon, Barefoot Jerry, on Ringo Starr's Beaucoups of Blues, on Gene Summers' Gene Summers in Nashville and 12 Golden Country Greats by Ween. In the fifteen-year period at the height of his activity, McCoy played on over 400 recording sessions per year. Some of his memorable harmonica solos were on "(Old Dogs, Children and) Watermelon Wine" (Tom T. Hall), "Candy Man" (Roy Orbison), He Stopped Loving Her Today (George Jones), and "I Was Country When Country Wasn't Cool"( Barbara Mandrell).

For 19 years McCoy worked as music director for the popular television show Hee Haw, and was a member of the Million Dollar Band, a group of all-star session musicians who performed on the show. On May 17, 2009, McCoy was inducted into the Country Music Hall of Fame. He is a member of the International Musicians Hall of Fame and the West Virginia Music Hall of Fame. In May, 2016, West Virginia University awarded McCoy an Honorary Doctor of Musical Arts. In 2017, The West Virginia University Press published Fifty Cents and a Box Top: The Creative Life of Nashville Session Musician Charlie McCoy.

During the Saturday night broadcast on June 11, 2022, McCoy was invited to become a member of the Grand Ole Opry by Vince Gill. He was inducted by Larry Gatlin on July 13, 2022.

== Personal life ==
McCoy has two children with his first wife and five grandchildren. Each of his grandchildren has contributed to one of his albums in some way. His second granddaughter did the artwork for three album covers (Somewhere Over The Rainbow, Smooth Sailing, Celtic Dreams) and sang on one of his Christmas CDs. His oldest granddaughter played flute and sang on a few of his albums. Each of the youngest three has sung on one of his albums, as has his son (Charlie, Jr.) and daughter (Ginger).

== Television ==
=== Television appearances as an artist ===
- Hee Haw
- Music City Tonight
- Nashville Now
- CMA Awards Show
- Arthritis Telethon
- The Mike Douglas Show
- The Midnight Special
- The Colgate Country Showdown
- That Good Old Nashville Music
- Pop Goes The Country
- New Country
- The Orange Blossom Special
- The Hee Haw Honeys
- The Johnny Cash Show
- Prime Time Country
- Nashville Swing Canada
- The Val Doonican Show England
- The West Virginia Music Hall Of Fame Awards Show 2008
- Larry's Country Diner

=== Television shows as a music director ===
- Hee Haw
- The Colgate Country Showdown
- The Nashville Palace
- The Hee Haw Honeys
- The Hee Haw 10th Anniversary Show
- The Hee Haw 20th Anniversary Show
- Happy New Year From Opryland
- The Charlie Daniels Christmas Special
- The Mickey Gilley Arthritis Telethon
- Tootsie's, Where the Songs Began
- Country Gold
- The International Musicians Hall Of Fame Awards Show 2008

== Discography ==
=== Albums (partial listing) ===
Year	Album	US Country	US	Label
1967	The World of Charlie McCoy			Monument
1968	The Real McCoy (First Version)			Monument
1972	The Real McCoy (Hot Dog Bun Cover)	2	98	Monument
1972	Charlie McCoy	7	120	Monument
1973	Good Time Charlie	1	155	Monument
1973	The Fastest Harp in the South	2	213	Monument
1974	The Nashville Hit Man	13		Monument
1974	Christmas			Monument
1975	Charlie My Boy	36		Monument
1975	Harpin' the Blues	34		Monument
1976	Play It Again Charlie	48		Monument
1977	Country Cookin'			Monument
1977	Stone Fox Chase (Issued in UK Only)			Monument
1978	Greatest Hits			Monument
1979	Appalachian Fever			Monument
1988	Charlie McCoy's 13th			Step One
1989	Beam Me Up Charlie			Step One
1991	Out on a Limb			Step One
1995	American Roots			Koka Media (France)
1998	Precious Memories			Revival (UK)
2003	Classic Country			Green Hill
2007	A Celtic Bridge			Flying Harp
2010	Duets (Volume One)			Flying Harp
2013	Smooth Sailing			Flying Harp
2015	Celtic Dreams			Flying Harp
2017	Ear Candy			Flying Harp

=== Singles ===
Year	Song	Chart Positions			Album
Year	Song	US Country	US	CAN Country	Album
1961	"Cherry Berry Wine"	—	99	—	single only
1968	"Gimmie Some Lovin'/The Boy From England"	—	—	—	The World of Charlie McCoy (promotional single only)
1972	"Today I Started Loving You Again"	16	—	13	The Real McCoy
1972	"I'm So Lonesome I Could Cry"	23	—	21	Charlie McCoy
1972	"I Really Don't Want to Know"	19	—	19	Charlie McCoy
1973	"Orange Blossom Special"	26	101	24	Good Time Charlie
1973	"Shenandoah"	33	—	37	Good Time Charlie
1973	"Release Me"	33	—	55	Fastest Harp in the South
1974	"Silver Threads and Golden Needles"	68	—	—	The Nashville Hit Man
1974	"Boogie Woogie" (with Barefoot Jerry)	22	—	24	The Nashville Hit Man
1974	"I Can't Help It"	—	—	—	The Nashville Hit Man
1974	"Blue Christmas"	—	—	—	Christmas
1975	"Everybody Stand Up and Holler for the Union"	—	—	—	Charlie My Boy
1975	"Juke"	—	—	—	Charlie My Boy
1975	"Pots and Pans"	—	—	—	Play It Again Charlie
1975	"Columbus Stockade Blues"	—	—	—	Harpin' the Blues
1976	"Wabash Cannonball"	97	—	—	Play It Again Charlie
1977	"Summit Ridge Drive" (with Barefoot Jerry)	98	—	—	Play It Again Charlie
1977	"Amazing Grace"	—	—	—	Country Cookin'
1977	"Foggy River"	—	—	—	Country Cookin'
1978	"Fair and Tender Ladies"	30	—	35	Appalachian Fever
1978	"Drifting Lovers"	96	—	—	Appalachian Fever
1979	"Midnight Flyer"	94	—	—	Appalachian Fever
1979	"Ramblin' Music Man"	94	—	—	Appalachian Fever
1981	"Until the Night" (with Laney Smallwood)	92	—	—	singles only
1983	"The State of Our Union" (with Laney Smallwood as Laney Hicks)	74	—	—	singles only
1989	"I'm So Lonesome I Could Cry" (re-recording)	—	—	—	13th
1990	"One O'Clock Jump"	—	—	—	13th

== Collaborations ==
- Highway 61 Revisited – Bob Dylan (1965)
- Blonde on Blonde – Bob Dylan (1966)
- John Wesley Harding – Bob Dylan (1967)
- Country, My Way – Nancy Sinatra (1967)
- How Great Thou Art – Elvis Presley (1967)
- The Way I Feel – Gordon Lightfoot (1967)
- I Stand Alone – Al Kooper (1968)
- One Day at a Time – Joan Baez (1969)
- Nashville Skyline – Bob Dylan (1970)
- Easy Does It – Al Kooper (1970)
- Beaucoups of Blues – Ringo Starr (1970)
- Blessed Are... – Joan Baez (1971)
- Elvis Country (I'm 10,000 Years Old) – Elvis Presley (1971)
- Yesterday's Wine – Willie Nelson (1971)
- Summer Side of Life – Gordon Lightfoot (1971)
- Come from the Shadows – Joan Baez (1972)
- Paul Simon – Paul Simon (1972)
- He Touched Me – Elvis Presley (1972)
- Really – J. J. Cale (1972)
- Rock and Roll Resurrection – Ronnie Hawkins (1972)
- Hank Wilson's Back Vol. I – Leon Russell (1973)
- Spider Jiving – Andy Fairweather Low (1974)
- Seven – Bob Seger (1974)
- Don't Stop Believin' – Olivia Newton-John (1976)
- Lovin' and Learnin' – Tanya Tucker (1976)
- Honest Lullaby – Joan Baez (1979)
- High Country Snows – Dan Fogelberg (1985)
- Girls Like Me – Tanya Tucker (1986)
- Greatest Hits Encore – Tanya Tucker (1990)
- Let There Be Peace on Earth – Vince Gill (1994)
- 12 Golden Country Greats – Ween (1996)
- The Houston Kid – Rodney Crowell (2001)
- Fate's Right Hand – Rodney Crowell (2003)
- Thrasher – Brandon Flowers (2026)

== Bibliography ==
- Kosser, Michael (2006), How Nashville Became Music City U.S.A: 50 Years of Music Row, Hal Leonard Corp., ISBN 978-0634098062
