= Area Code 615 (band) =

American supergroup

- Origin: Nashville, Tennessee, U.S.
- Genres: Country rock; progressive country
- Years active: 1969–1971
- Label: Polydor/PolyGram
- Spinoffs: Barefoot Jerry
- Past members: Kenny Buttrey; Wayne Moss; David Briggs; Mac Gayden; Charlie McCoy; Weldon Myrick; Norman Putnam; Buddy Spicher; Bobby Thompson

Area Code 615 was an American supergroup from Nashville, Tennessee, consisting primarily of younger session musicians.

They took their name from the telephone area code, which at the time covered all of Central and Eastern Tennessee. Although their recording "Stone Fox Chase" was used as the theme of the BBC's music program The Old Grey Whistle Test, the band found difficulty getting respect from either conservative country music audiences or the mainstream rock press.

Area Code 615 recorded two albums, one instrumental and one with vocals, before disbanding. Wayne Moss, along with Nashville session steel guitarist Russ Hicks, formed Barefoot Jerry to continue Area Code 615's progressive country rock style. Mac Gayden, and Kenny Buttrey also played in the new band.

== Musicians ==
- Mac Gayden – Lead guitar, vocals (died 2025)
- Charlie McCoy – Harmonica, vocals
- Bobby Thompson – Banjo, guitar (died 2005)
- Wayne Moss – Guitar, bass
- Buddy Spicher – Fiddle, viola, cello
- David Briggs – Keyboards
- Ken Lauber – Keyboards
- Norbert Putnam – Bass, cello
- Kenny Buttrey – Drums (died 2004)
- Weldon Myrick – Pedal steel guitar (died 2014)
- Elliot Mazer – Co-producer

== Discography ==
- Area Code 615, 1969 (the album peaked at No. 191 on the Billboard Top LPs during a four-week stay on the chart).
- Trip in the Country, 1970
