= Play Me Backwards =

Studio album by Joan Baez
- Released: October 1992
- Recorded: Nashville, 1992
- Genre: Folk-pop, country pop
- Length: 36:19
- Label: Virgin
- Producer: Wally Wilson, Kenny Greenberg

Joan Baez chronology
Speaking of Dreams (1989)	Play Me Backwards (1992)	Rare, Live & Classic (1993)

Play Me Backwards is an album by the American musician Joan Baez, released in 1992. The album was nominated for a Grammy for Best Contemporary Folk Recording. Baez supported it with an international tour.

In 2011, Play Me Backwards was reissued on CD with a bonus disc of 10 previously unreleased tracks, including "The Trouble with the Truth", "Medicine Wheel" and a cover of Bob Dylan's "Seven Curses".

== Production ==
Recorded in Nashville, the album was produced by Wally Wilson and Kenny Greenberg. Baez sought out material after being dismayed with the songs pitched to her; she spent 14 months trying to find the right songs. The album's first single, "Stones in the Road", for which Baez shot a video, was written by Mary Chapin Carpenter. "Through Your Hands" was written by John Hiatt. "I'm with You" is about Baez's son, Gabriel.

== Critical reception ==
Professional ratings
Review scores
Source	Rating
AllMusic	3/5 stars
The Indianapolis Star	3/4 stars
Rolling Stone	4/5 stars

The Boston Globe called Play Me Backwards "mostly an album of mature, surprisingly percussive folk-pop love songs that marks her finest work since her Diamonds and Rust album of 1975." The Sun-Sentinel wrote that "Baez's erstwhile hyper-quivering soprano thankfully does not flutter so much, and has deepened marvelously with age."

The Chicago Tribune deemed the album "a surprisingly relaxed, rhythmic and modern set that sounds like it could have been recorded by any one of a number of today's folk-and country-flavored pop female singer-songwriters." The Indianapolis Star noted that "Baez's voice sounds as pure as ever."

== Track listing ==
All tracks composed by Joan Baez, Wally Wilson and Kenny Greenberg, except where indicated.

1. "Play Me Backwards"
2. "Amsterdam" (Janis Ian, Buddy Mondlock)
3. "Isaac and Abraham"
4. "Stones in the Road" (Mary Chapin Carpenter)
5. "Steal Across the Border" (Ron Davies)
6. "I'm with You" (Baez)
7. "I'm with You" (Reprise) (Baez)
8. "Strange Rivers" (John Stewart)
9. "Through Your Hands" (John Hiatt)
10. "The Dream Song"
11. "The Edge of Glory"

== Personnel ==
Musicians

- Joan Baez – guitar, vocals
- Greg Barnhill – backing vocals
- Richard Bennett – electric guitar
- Ashley Cleveland – backing vocals
- Chad Cromwell – drums
- Jerry Douglas – Dobro, guitar, lap steel guitar, Weissenborn
- Carl Gorodetzky – violin
- Kenny Greenberg – acoustic and electric guitar
- Vicki Hampton – backing vocals
- Mike Lawler – organ, synthesizer
- Bob Mason – cello
- Edgar Meyer – upright bass
- Jonell Mosser – backing vocals
- Steve Nathan – organ, Wurlitzer
- Cyndi Richardson – backing vocals
- Jerry Roady – percussion
- Tom Roady – percussion
- Chris Rodriguez – backing vocals
- Pamela Sixfin – violin
- James Stroud – drums
- Marcos Suzano – percussion, berimbau
- Willie Weeks – bass guitar
- Kristin Wilkinson – viola
- Wally Wilson – synthesizer, piano, producer
- Glenn Worf – bass guitar

Others

- James A. Ball – engineer
- Peter Coleman – engineer
- Tom Dolan – design
- Roy Gamble – engineer, second engineer
- Aaron D. Jacoves – A&R/executive producer
- Eric Gorodetzky – engineer, second engineer
- Kenny Greenberg – producer
- Mick Haggerty – art direction
- Bob Ludwig – mastering
- Melanie Nissen – photography
- Greg Parker – engineer, second engineer
- Ed Simonton – engineer, second engineer
- Kevin Smith – mixing
- Taylor York – engineer
