= Watchin' TV =

Studio album by Barefoot Jerry
- Released: 1974
- Studio: Cinderella Sound, Nashville
- Genre: Country, soft rock
- Label: Monument

Barefoot Jerry chronology
Barefoot Jerry (1972)	Watchin' TV (1974)	You Can't Get Off with Your Shoes On (1975)

Watchin' TV is an album by the American band Barefoot Jerry, released in 1974. The first single was "Watchin' TV (With the Radio On)". The band supported it by playing Willie Nelson's Fourth of July Picnic. The album was reissued in 2018, along with You Can't Get Off with Your Shoes On.

== Production ==
The album was recorded at Cinderella Sound Studios, in Nashville. Fred Newell (vocals), Dave Doran (bass), and Si Edwards (drums) joined the band prior to the recordings sessions. Many of the songs have religious overtones. "Two Mile Pike" is an instrumental. "Funny Lookin' Eyes" is based on a riff similar to Cream's "Sunshine of Your Love".

== Critical reception ==
Professional ratings
Review scores
Source	Rating
All Music Guide to Country	3/5 stars
The Blade-Tribune	3/5 stars
The New Rolling Stone Record Guide	3/5 stars
Southern Rock Review	6/10

The Blade-Tribune praised the first two songs but opined that the album then "slowly loses appeal and consistency ... despite some excellent individual performances". The College Heights Herald called the title track "a funky, freewheeling tune". The Tennessean noted that band "is brave enough to mix real harmony and pedal steel". Billboard labeled the music "basically soft rock with a touch of country".

Brian Hinton, in his book Country Roads: How Country Came to Nashville, likened the band on "Mother Nature's Way of Saying High" to "a redneck Grateful Dead". Peter Doggett said that they often resembled "a hillbilly Cheech and Chong". Martin Popoff concluded that Barefoot Jerry were "not exactly southern rock but too imaginative and sly in a Steely Dan frame of mind for country".

== Track listing ==
Side 1

1. "Watchin' TV (With the Radio On)"
2. "Funny Lookin' Eyes"
3. "Pig Snoots and Nehi Red"
4. "Hay Queen"
5. "Two Mile Pike"

Side 2

1. "Faded Love"
2. "There Must Be a Better Way"
3. "If There Were Only Time for Love"
4. "Violets and Daffodils"
5. "Mother Nature's Way of Saying High"
