= Rare, Live & Classic =

Box set by Joan Baez
- Released: November 1993
- Recorded: compilation albums
- Genre: Folk
- Label: Vanguard
- Producers: Joan Baez, Nancy Lutzow and Mark Spector

Joan Baez chronology
Play Me Backwards (1992)	Rare, Live & Classic (1993)	Ring Them Bells (1995)

Professional ratings
Review scores
Source	Rating
Allmusic	link
Rolling Stone	link

Rare, Live & Classic is a 1993 box set compilation by Joan Baez. Released on Vanguard, where Baez had recorded her most influential work during the first twelve years of her career, the set also included material from her subsequent record labels, A&M, Columbia and Gold Castle Records, as well as a number of previously unreleased studio and live recordings. Bob Dylan, Bob Gibson, Mimi Fariña, Judy Collins, Odetta and Kris Kristofferson are among those who make guest appearances on the various tracks; also included were two tracks from a never-released album recorded in 1981 with the Grateful Dead.

== Track listing ==
Disc One

1. "Scarlet Ribbons" (Evelyn Danzig, Segal)
2. "Jimmy Brown" (traditional)
3. "Careless Love" (traditional)
4. "Auctioneer" (traditional)
5. "Black Is The Color" (traditional)
6. "John Hardy" (traditional)
7. "We Are Crossing Jordan River" (traditional) (duet with Bob Gibson)
8. "John Riley" (traditional)
9. "Silver Dagger" (traditional)
10. "House of the Rising Sun" (traditional)
11. "Low Down Chariot" (Alan Lomax, John Lomax)
12. "Wagoner's Lad" (traditional)
13. "Last Night I Had The Strangest Dream" (Ed McCurdy)
14. "Geordie" (traditional)
15. "What Have They Done to the Rain" (Malvina Reynolds)
16. "Troubled and I Don't Know Why" (Bob Dylan) (live duet with Bob Dylan)
17. "With God on Our Side" (Bob Dylan)
18. "We Shall Overcome" (Z. Horton, Hamilton, G. Carawan, Pete Seeger)
19. "Go 'Way From My Window" (John Jacob Niles)
20. "Mama, You Been on My Mind" (Bob Dylan) (live duet with Bob Dylan)
21. "There But for Fortune" (Phil Ochs)
22. "Colours" (Donovan) (live duet with Donovan)
23. "The River in the Pines" (traditional)

Disc Two

1. "Pack Up Your Sorrows" (Richard Fariña, Pauline Marden)
2. "The Swallow Song" (Richard Fariña)
3. "Legend of a Girl Child Linda" (Donovan) (trio with Judy Collins and Mimi Fariña)
4. "Children of Darkness" (Richard Fariña)
5. "Catch the Wind" (Donovan)
6. "I am a Poor Wayfaring Stranger" (traditional) (duet with Mimi Fariña)
7. "Sweet Sir Galahad" (Joan Baez)
8. "Donna Donna" (A. Zeitlin, S. Secunda)
9. "Long Black Veil" (Marijohn Wilkin)
10. "Mama Tried" (Merle Haggard)
11. "Sing Me Back Home" (Merle Haggard)
12. "Joe Hill" (Alfred Hayes, Earl Robinson)
13. "The Night They Drove Old Dixie Down" (Robbie Robertson)
14. "Blessed Are..." (Joan Baez)
15. "Hello in There" (John Prine) (duet with Kris Kristofferson)
16. "Love Song to a Stranger" (Joan Baez)
17. "In The Quiet Morning (For Janis Joplin)" (Mimi Fariña)
18. "Angel Band" (traditional) (duet with Jeffrey Shurtleffe)
19. "Johnny, I Hardly Knew Yeh" (traditional)
20. "Gracias a la Vida" (Violeta Parra)

Disc Three

1. "Diamonds & Rust" (Joan Baez)
2. "Children and All That Jazz" (Joan Baez)
3. "Blowin' in the Wind" (Bob Dylan) (live duet with Bob Dylan)
4. "Swing Low, Sweet Chariot" (traditional)
5. "Jesse" (Janis Ian)
6. "Honest Lullaby" (Joan Baez)
7. "Jackaroe" (traditional) (with the Grateful Dead)
8. "Marriott USA" (Joan Baez) (with the Grateful Dead)
9. "Amazing Grace" (traditional)
10. "Forever Young" (Bob Dylan)
11. "Farewell, Angelina" (Bob Dylan)
12. "A Hard Rain's A-Gonna Fall" (Bob Dylan)
13. "Here's to You" (Joan Baez, E. Morricone)
14. "Blues Improv" (Joan Baez, Odetta) (duet with Odetta)
15. "Ring Them Bells" (Bob Dylan)
16. "El Preso Numero Nueve" (H. Cantoral)
17. "Speaking of Dreams" (Joan Baez)
