= Sis Cunningham =

- Also known as: Sis
- Born: Agnes Cunningham; February 19, 1909
- Origin: Watonga, Oklahoma, U.S.
- Died: June 27, 2004 (aged 95)
- Genres: Folk
- Occupations: Musician, songwriter, magazine editor
- Instruments: Piano, accordion
- Label: Folkways

Agnes "Sis" Cunningham (February 19, 1909 – June 27, 2004) was an American musician, best known as a performer and publicist of folk music and protest songs. She was the founding editor of Broadside magazine, which she published with her husband Gordon Friesen and their daughters.

== Early life ==
Sis Cunningham was born in Watonga, Oklahoma in Blaine County. She was the daughter of Ada Boyce and William Cunningham, an amateur fiddler, and grew up on a small homestead farm situated on land that was once part of the Cheyenne-Arapaho Indian Reservation. Her father was a socialist and follower of Eugene Debs, the American Socialist Party leader. As a child, Cunningham learned piano, accordion, and musical arrangement. In 1929, she attended the Weatherford Teachers' College in Oklahoma, now known as Southwestern Oklahoma State University, where she studied music. After graduating from Weatherford, Cunningham went on to the Commonwealth Labor College near Mena, Arkansas, in 1932, where she studied labor organizing and Marxism. During her time there, she also studied labor journalism, labor-farmer union development, and social theatre. During this time, she started to write labor songs. After completing her coursework and moving back to Oklahoma, Cunningham began recruiting for the Southern Tenant Farmers' Union.

== Career ==
After Commonwealth, Cunningham became a music teacher at the Southern Labor School for Women near, Asheville, North Carolina in 1937. In late 1939, she was a founding member of the Red Dust Players, an agit-prop group in Oklahoma, that promoted propaganda and political agitation through short plays. Performing throughout the countryside in Oklahoma at union meetings, the Red Dust Players sought to educate tenant-farmers, sharecroppers, and farm workers on how the union could benefit them. Fleeing harassment, she and fellow Communist Party member Gordon Friesen married on July 23, 1941, before fleeing to New York City in November to avoid harassment and arrest on account of the Red Scare.

They moved into the Greenwich Village household known as Almanac House, on 130 West Tenth Street, where their housemates included Pete Seeger and Woody Guthrie. Cunningham was briefly a member of the Almanac Singers, appearing on the 1942 album Dear Mr. President for Keynote Records. After attempting unsuccessfully to start a Detroit, Michigan equivalent of the Almanacs, she took a job in a war plant, while Friesen went to work as a reporter for the Detroit Times.

Cunningham was on the founding committee of People's Songs, a radical musical organization founded in December 1945 in New York City by Pete Seeger, Alan Lomax, Lee Hays and others notable members of the folk community. People's Songs went bankrupt in 1948, when it put all its resources into Henry A. Wallace's presidential election. However, the People's Songs Bulletin served as a template for Broadside Magazine that Cunningham later co-founded.

Sis Cunningham was also a songwriter. She wrote "How Can You Keep on Movin' (Unless You Migrate Too)?" which was featured on the New Lost City Ramblers' 1959 album Songs of the Depression. Ry Cooder later recorded the song as a strident march on his album Into the Purple Valley. Unaware of its authorship, Cooder initially credited the song as "traditional" until the omission was brought to his attention, which meant Cunningham was deprived of earnings for the use of her song. The omission was pointed out to him; he and the label corrected the attribution on later pressings.

Her Dust Bowl tale, "My Oklahoma Home," written with her brother Bill Cunningham and performed by Seeger in 1961, fell into oblivion before it was revived by Bruce Springsteen in 2006 for his We Shall Overcome: The Seeger Sessions album and subsequent Seeger Sessions Band Tour.

After World War II, Cunningham and Friesen were among the first victims of the anti-communist blacklist. She secured a few bookings as part of the roster of Pete Seeger's booking agency, People's Songs, but due to ill health, poverty, and depression, she largely fell out of the music world for over a decade.

== Broadside Magazine ==
One of Cunningham and Friesen's most lasting contributions was Broadside, a small but influential magazine they published for twenty-six years. After years away from the music scene, Cunningham reemerged into the public eye as the founding editor of the magazine. They launched Broadside in 1962 with financial support from Pete Seeger and others.

A shoestring operation, the magazine was kept afloat by subsidies from Seeger and his wife, Toshi. Cunningham also served as a paid secretary for Seeger during a year-long world tour from 1963 through 1964. They mimeographed the magazine on a machine inherited from the American Labor Party and had to smuggle out copies, as their housing project prohibited domestic commercial ventures. Their apartment became a gathering place for young musicians, including Bob Dylan, Phil Ochs, and Gil Turner, who recorded songs there. Cunningham transcribed the lyrics and musical notation, while Gordon wrote the commentary. Though Broadside’s circulation never exceeded four figures, its influence spread nationwide. The magazine published the songs of many of the 1960s' most influential topical songwriters and accepted social and political pieces from artists including Dylan, Ochs, Janis Ian, Tom Paxton, The Freedom Singers, Buffy Sainte Marie, Len Chandler, and Malvina Reynolds. Both she and Broadside continued to inspire the topical music movement, with the magazine reaching its peak around 1970. Cunningham remained politically active, participating in events such as hootenannies even as she grew older. The magazine survived until 1988.

In 1976, Folkways Records released Broadside Ballads, Vol. 9: Sundown, Cunningham's only solo album on the label (though she had been featured on several other albums, including Seeger's Broadside Ballads, Vol. and Phil Ochs' Broadside Tapes 1).

In 2000, Smithsonian Folkways released The Best of Broadside: 1962-1988, a five-CD collection of eighty-nine songs first published in the magazine, honoring Cunningham's work. The collection went on to receive two Grammy Award nominations.

== Later years ==
Toward the end of their lives Cunningham and Friesen wrote Red Dust and Broadsides: A Joint Autobiography, published in 1999. Friesen died in 1996, and Cunningham followed in June 2004.

== Discography ==
- Sundown (Folkways FH 5319, 1976)
- Brownwater and Blood (with Jeff Ampolsk and Bob Norman) (Folkways FS 5261, 1979)

== Additional Sources ==
- Duffy, Peter, "Words and Music for a Revolution," New York Times, February 11, 2001.
- Cunningham, Agnes "Sis", and Gordon Friesen, Red Dust and Broadsides: A Joint Autobiography, edited by Ronald D. Cohen, with a foreword by Pete Seeger (Amherst: University of Massachusetts Press, 1999), ISBN 1-55849-210-0
- “Remembering Sis Cunningham,” NPR: All Things Considered, June 30, 2004. https://www.npr.org/2004/06/30/3057022/remembering-sis-cunningham
- Richard Higgs, “The Ballad of Sis Cunningham,” This Land Press, January 12, 2017. https://thislandpress.com/2017/01/12/the-ballad-of-sis-cunningham/
- “Cover Me: My Oklahoma Home,” E Street Shuffle, March 4, 2020. https://estreetshuffle.com/index.php/2020/03/04/cover-me-my-oklahoma-home/
- “Agnes ‘Sis’ Cunningham,” Biography on AllMusic.com, https://www.allmusic.com/artist/agnes-sis-cunningham-mn0001400761#biography
- Featured in the “Industry Professionals” section of Music HerStory: Women and Music of Social Change, online exhibition, Smithsonian Libraries and Archives. https://library.si.edu/exhibition/music-herstory/industry-professionals
