= Blessed Are... =

Studio album by Joan Baez
- Released: July 31, 1971
- Recorded: 1971
- Studios: Quadrafonic (Nashville, Tennessee)
- Genres: Folk; country folk; folk rock
- Length: 78:09
- Label: Vanguard VSD-6570/1
- Producer: Norbert Putnam

Joan Baez chronology
Carry It On (1971)	Blessed Are... (1971)	Come from the Shadows (1972)

Professional ratings
Review scores
Source	Rating
AllMusic	link
Rolling Stone	(mixed) link

Blessed Are... is the twelfth studio album (and fourteenth overall) by Joan Baez and her last with Vanguard Records, released in July 1971. It included her hit cover of the Band's "The Night They Drove Old Dixie Down" and songs by Kris Kristofferson, the Beatles, Jesse Winchester, and the Rolling Stones as well as a number of Baez' own compositions. Like its immediate predecessors, the album was recorded in Nashville and had a decidedly country feel.

The original vinyl version was released as a double album, which also included a bonus 7" 33 1/3 rpm record which included the songs "Maria Dolores" and Woody Guthrie's "Deportee", which she dedicated to the farmers of the world, adding "May they soon cease to be victims." On CD pressings, these two tracks are on a separate disc, as the Red Book standards prohibit fitting them on a single, 80-minute disc.

It was Baez' final studio album for Vanguard, her label of the previous eleven years, as she signed with A&M in early 1972.

== Track listing ==
All tracks composed by Joan Baez; except where indicated

=== Side 1 ===
1. "Blessed Are..." – 3:03
2. "The Night They Drove Old Dixie Down" (Robbie Robertson) – 3:26
3. "Salt of the Earth" (Mick Jagger, Keith Richards) – 3:22
4. "Three Horses" – 7:03
5. "The Brand New Tennessee Waltz" (Jesse Winchester) – 3:07

=== Side 2 ===
1. "Last, Lonely and Wretched" – 3:42
2. "Lincoln Freed Me Today (The Slave)" (David Patton) – 3:21
3. "Outside the Nashville City Limits" – 3:20
4. "San Francisco Mabel Joy" (Mickey Newbury) – 4:23
5. "When Time Is Stolen" – 2:58

=== Side 3 ===
1. "Heaven Help Us All" (Ronald Miller) – 3:32
2. "Angeline" (Mickey Newbury) – 3:37
3. "Help Me Make It Through the Night" (Kris Kristofferson) – 2:58
4. "Let It Be" (John Lennon, Paul McCartney) – 3:48
5. "Put Your Hand in the Hand" (Gene MacLellan) – 3:20

=== Side 4 ===
1. "Gabriel and Me" – 3:27
2. "Milanese Waltz/Marie Flore" – 5:55
3. "The Hitchhikers' Song" – 4:19
4. "The 33rd of August" (Mickey Newbury) – 3:42
5. "Fifteen Months" – 4:30

=== Bonus 7" ===
1. "Maria Dolores" (Fernando García Morcillo, Jacobo Morcillo) (track on bonus 7") – 3:25
2. "Deportee (Plane Wreck at Los Gatos)" (Woody Guthrie, Martin Hoffman) (track on bonus 7") – 5:15
3. "Warm and Tender Love" (2005 bonus track) – 4:06

== Personnel ==
- Joan Baez – guitar, vocals
- Norman Blake – dobro, guitar
- David Briggs – keyboards
- Kenneth A. Buttrey – drums
- Charlie McCoy – harmonica
- Norbert Putnam – bass, arranger, producer
- Buddy Spicher – violin
- Pete Wade – guitar
- Ed Logan – tenor saxophone
- The Holladays – singers

Technical

- Gene Eichelberger – engineer
- Dave Harris – artwork
- Jobriath – design
- Jack Lothrop – producer
- Jim Marshall – photography

== Chart positions ==
Chart (1971)	Peak position
Canada Top Albums/CDs (RPM)	12
US Billboard 200	11
Norwegian Albums (VG-lista)	26
Australian Albums (Kent Music Report)	36

== Certifications ==
Certifications for Blessed Are
Region	Certification	Certified units/sales
United States (RIAA)	Gold	500,000^{^}
^{^} Shipments figures based on certification alone.
