= Barefoot Jerry =

American country and rock band

- Origin: Nashville, Tennessee, United States
- Genres: Progressive country; country rock; southern rock
- Years active: 1971–1977 and occasional reunions to the present
- Labels: Capitol Records; Warner Bros. Records; Monument Records
- Spinoff of: Area Code 615
- Past members: Terry Dearmore; Kenny Buttrey; Jim Colvard; Dave Doran; Si Edwards; Mac Gayden; John Harris; Warren Hartman; Russ Hicks; Kenny Malone; Charlie McCoy; Wayne Moss; Fred Newell; Barry Chance
- Website: http://www.barefootjerry.com/

Barefoot Jerry is an American country and rock band from Nashville, Tennessee, formed by Wayne Moss, following the disbanding of Area Code 615. They have been described as progressive country, country rock and as a seminal southern rock band.

== Career ==
Wayne Moss formed Barefoot Jerry with fellow Nashville session musician Russ Hicks, a steel guitarist, following the disbanding of Moss's previous band, Area Code 615. Barefoot Jerry's first lineup consisted of:

- Wayne Moss – guitar, keyboards, vocals, bass
- Russ Hicks – guitar, steel guitar, horn, vocals
- Mac Gayden – lead guitar, vocals, slide guitar
- Kenneth A. Buttrey – drums
- John Harris – keyboards

Moss, Buttrey and Gayden originally played together on many of Mike Nesmith's Nashville sessions and had been in Area Code 615. Gayden wrote the number one UK hit single by the Love Affair, "Everlasting Love". He also played the first slide wah wah guitar, on JJ Cale's "Crazy Mama."

A lineup without Hicks recorded Southern Delight before Gayden left in 1972 to form his own band, Skyboat; Buttrey joined Neil Young's band. Moss and Harris were soon joined by Hicks and Kenny Malone (drums) on the album Barefoot Jerry, released by Warner Bros. Records in 1972. This lineup later expanded to include Buddy Skipper (keyboards), Fred Newell (banjo, harmonica, vocals), Dave Doran (guitar, bass, vocals), Si Edwards (percussion), and (Area Code's) Bobby Thompson (bass, guitar, vocals) for Barefoot Jerry and the 1974 follow-up Watchin' TV.

The lineup of Moss, Hicks, Doran, Edwards, Skipper and Newell were recorded in a live performance in 1973, released in 2007 as Barefoot Jerry Live. Moss was the last original member of the band. Retaining Hicks and Edwards, they added Terry Dearmore (vocals, guitar, bass), Jim Colvard (guitar, bass) and Warren Hartman (keyboards). In 1975 they recorded You Can't Get Off With Your Shoes On.

With the departure of Hartman, Barry Chance (guitar) and Steve Davis (keyboards, guitar, vocals) joined the band for Keys to the Country in 1976. Davis and Dearmore departed, and Charlie McCoy (keyboards, harmonica, flutes, Jew's harp) and Mike McBride (bass, guitar, percussion, mandolin) joined for Barefootin' in 1977. The band split up in that year.

Wayne Moss appears as "Barefoot Jerry" along with Charlie Daniels, Guy Clark and David Allan Coe in the 1981 music documentary Heartworn Highways.

Barefoot Jerry were mentioned in Charlie Daniels's song "The South's Gonna Do It Again."

== Discography ==
=== Albums ===
- 1971: Southern Delight (Capitol Records)
- 1972: Barefoot Jerry (Warner Bros. Records)
- 1974: Watchin' TV (Monument Records)
- 1975: You Can't Get Off with Your Shoes On (Monument Records)
- 1976: Grocery (double-LP reissue of the first two albums; Monument Records)
- 1976: Keys to the Country (Monument Records)
- 1977: Barefootin' (Monument Records)
- 1997: Southern Delight/Barefoot Jerry (2-on-1 CD reissue on See For Miles)
- 1997: Watchin' TV/You Can't Get Off with Your Shoes On (2-on-1 CD reissue on See for Miles)
- 1997: Keys To The Country/Barefootin' (2-on-1 CD reissue on See For Miles)
- 2006: Keys To The Country/Barefootin' (CD reissue; Hux Records)
- 2007: Barefoot Jerry Live (recorded at the Exit/In in 1973 - available only from the official website)

=== Singles ===
Year	Single	Chart Positions	Album
Year	Single	US	Album
1975	"You Can't Get Off with Your Shoes On"	109	You Can't Get Off with Your Shoes On

=== Guest singles ===
Year	Single	Artist	Chart Positions		Album
Year	Single	Artist	US Country	CAN Country	Album
1974	"Boogie Woogie"	Charlie McCoy	22	24	The Nashville Hit Man
1977	"Summit Ridge Drive"	Charlie McCoy	98	—	Play It Again Charlie
