= Come from the Shadows =

Studio album by Joan Baez
- Released: May 1972
- Recorded: 1972
- Studios: Quadrafonic (Nashville, Tennessee)
- Genres: Folk, country folk, Americana
- Length: 41:38
- Label: A&M
- Producer: Joan Baez

Joan Baez chronology
Blessed Are... (1971)	Come from the Shadows (1972)	Where Are You Now, My Son? (1973)

Come from the Shadows is the thirteenth studio album (and fifteenth overall) by Joan Baez, released in 1972. After recording for the independent label Vanguard for more than a decade, Baez signed with A&M and attempted to point her career in a slightly more "commercial" direction (though the album still had overtly political overtones). In addition to her own compositions such as "Prison Trilogy", "Love Song to a Stranger", "Myths", and "To Bobby" (addressed to Bob Dylan), Baez included John Lennon's "Imagine", Anna Marly's "Song of the Partisan", and Mimi Fariña's "In the Quiet Morning (for Janis Joplin)".

"In the Quiet Morning" and "Love Song to a Stranger" were released as singles. The album was recorded at Quadrafonic Sound Studios in Nashville. The cover photo features an elderly couple being arrested at an anti-war protest, holding hands and flashing peace signs as they are led away.

The album's liner notes feature a Baez quote: "...In 1972 if you don't fight against a rotten thing you become a part of it."

The album peaked at No. 48 on the US Billboard Top LPs & Tape and at No. 41 on the Canadian album charts.

== Critical reception ==
Noel Coppage from Stereo Review was underwhelmed by the album, finding much of it "merely generally pleasant" and "poorly constructed". Robert Christgau gave Come from the Shadows a "C+" in Creem magazine. He mocked Baez's attempt at populist politics and her cultivated vocabulary, singling out the lyrics to "Myths": "I don't know about The People, but just plain people say 'scattered upon the four winds,' not 'upon the four winds scattered.' Actually they don't say 'scattered upon the four winds' either". AllMusic's William Ruhlmann later gave it three out of five stars.

== Track listing ==
All tracks composed by Joan Baez; except where noted.

1. "Prison Trilogy (Billy Rose)" – 4:23
2. "Rainbow Road" (Donnie Fritts, Dan Penn) – 3:03
3. "Love Song to a Stranger" – 3:55
4. "Myths" – 3:19
5. "In the Quiet Morning" (Mimi Fariña) – 2:58
6. "All the Weary Mothers of the Earth (People's Union #1)" – 3:34
7. "To Bobby" – 3:53
8. "Song of Bangladesh" – 4:49
9. "A Stranger in My Place" (Kenny Rogers, Kin Vassy) – 3:07
10. "Tumbleweed" (Douglas Van Arsdale) – 3:32
11. "The Partisan" (Anna Marly, Hy Zaret) – 3:17
12. "Imagine" (John Lennon) – 3:27

== Personnel ==
- Joan Baez – guitar, vocals
- Stuart Basore – steel guitar
- David Briggs – keyboards
- Kenneth Buttrey – drums
- Grady Martin – guitar
- Charlie McCoy – harp, guitar
- Farrell Morris – percussion
- Weldon Myrick – steel guitar
- Norbert Putnam – bass guitar
- Glen Spreen – keyboards, string arrangements
- Pete Wade – guitar
- John "Bucky" Wilkin – guitar

== Charts ==
Chart (1972)	Peak position
US Billboard Top LPs & Tape	48
CAN RPM Top Albums	41

== See also ==
Wikiquote - Quotes from Come From the Shadows
