= Love Is Just a Four-Letter Word =

Single by Joan Baez

from the album Any Day Now
- B-side: "Love Minus Zero/No Limit"
- Released: December 1968
- Recorded: September 1968
- Studio: Columbia Studios, Nashville
- Genre: Folk
- Length: 3:26
- Label: Vanguard (UK); Vanguard (US)
- Songwriter: Bob Dylan
- Producers: Maynard Solomon; Joan Baez

Joan Baez singles chronology
"Be Not Too Hard" (1967)	"Love Is Just a Four-Letter Word" (1968)	"Sweet Sir Galahad" (1969)

"Love is Just a Four-Letter Word" is a song written by Bob Dylan, first recorded by Joan Baez, who has recorded and performed the song numerous times throughout her career.

== Background ==
Baez immediately took to the song, which was written by Dylan sometime around 1965, and began performing it, even before it was finished. In the film Dont Look Back, a documentary of Dylan's 1965 tour of the UK, Baez is shown in one scene singing a fragment of the then apparently still unfinished song in a hotel room late at night. She then tells Dylan, "If you finish it, I'll sing it on a record".

Baez first included the song on Any Day Now, her 1968 album of Dylan songs; she has since recorded it three additional times. Her 1968 recording was also released as a single, reaching #86 on the Billboard Hot 100 chart. Baez has also included the song on numerous compilations such as The First Ten Years and Baez Sings Dylan, as well as on her live album From Every Stage.

Dylan never released a recording of this song, and, according to his website, he has never performed the song live either. Earl Scruggs released an instrumental version in 1970.
