= Broadside (magazine) =

American publication of folk music (1962–1988)

- Categories: Music magazine
- Founder: Agnes "Sis" Cunningham and Gordon Friesen
- Founded: 1962
- Final issue Number: 1988; 187
- Country: United States
- Language: English
- Website: www.broadsidemagazine.com
- ISSN: 0740-7955

Broadside magazine was a small mimeographed publication founded in 1962 by Agnes "Sis" Cunningham and her husband, Gordon Friesen. Hugely influential in the folk-revival, it was often controversial. Issues of what is folk music, what is folk rock, and who is folk were roundly discussed and debated. At the same time, Broadside nurtured and promoted important singers of the era.

The mimeograph machine used to produce the magazine had been discarded by the American Labor Party. The mixture of hand-drawn musical notation, typewriter text, and the occasional hand-drawn illustration or photocopied news story anticipated a look that would be more common in zines 20 years later.

By the end of the 1970s, Broadside had essentially ceased publication.

Many of the songs recorded for Broadside over its lifetime were released in 2000 as The Best of Broadside as a 5-CD boxed set. The many Broadside albums originally released by Folkways Records are available through Smithsonian Folkways at: https://folkways.si.edu/search?query=broadside

The Broadside archives, including all the reel-to-reel tapes of music (many of which have been digitized) are housed at the University of North Carolina. In addition, Sing Out! hosts a complete digital archive. (See External Links below.)

== Books ==
During the 1960s, Broadside put out three folio-sized trade paperback songbooks, Broadside Volume 1 (Oak Publications, 1964), Broadside Volume 2 (Oak, 1968, ISBN 0-8256-0112-6), and Broadside Volume III (Oak, 1970, ISBN 0-8256-0060-X). Each contained slightly under 100 songs, photo-reproduced from the original magazine. The first volume had a sewn binding, although the latter two used the glued binding more common for trade paperbacks.

Each volume featured a foreword, the first by Cunningham, the second by Friesen, and the third by Irwin Silber.

== Contributors to Broadside magazine ==
As Irwin Silber wrote in his foreword to Broadside Volume III, "A whole generation of song-writers, some of whom have become household names in the America of the 1960s, made their first appearances in Broadside…" Among those whose careers began there, Silber listed Tom Paxton, Phil Ochs (a major Broadside contributor; see also Sings for Broadside (Folkways, 1976) and The Broadside Tapes 1 (Folkways, circa 1980), Buffy Sainte-Marie, Janis Ian (originally under her real name, Janis Fink), and Arlo Guthrie.

Other, more established songwriters also contributed to Broadside, some of them (in Silber's words again) with "songs which commercial publishers didn't know what to do with…" Among these, Silber lists Pete Seeger, Nina Simone, Billy Edd Wheeler, and Malvina Reynolds.

Broadside generally eschewed rock music, including rock songs with political and social themes. One notable exception was the magazine's publication of the Black Sabbath song "War Pigs".

Cunningham herself published a number of songs in Broadside. Other contributors to Broadside included:

- Eric Andersen
- Len Chandler, Jr.
- Bob Dylan
- Larry Estridge
- Richard Fariña
- Tuli Kupferberg
- Peter La Farge
- Julius Lester
- Ewan MacColl
- Matt McGinn
- Bernice Reagon
- Patrick Sky (also known as Patrick Skye)
- Mark Spoelstra
- Gil Turner
- Vanessa Redgrave

== 1980s revival ==
The magazine was revived, around 1982, by Norman Ross of Clearwater Publishing (a microfiche publication and distribution company) as a part of the upswing in folk and political music of the times.

In his parody song, "Vaguely Reminiscent of the Sixties", Charlie King captured the era of singer/songwriter and social movements that had helped to bring about many social changes. Music was a firm part of these movements and was frequently included in meetings, protests, seminars, teach-ins and other activities.

Broadside in the 1980s, edited by Jeff Ritter, a musician and graduate student at the time, covered multiple movements and songwriters including Arlo Guthrie, Billy Bragg, Michelle Shocked, Charlie King, Holly Near and more. The revival of the Newport Folk Festival coincided with this era and many singer-songwriters who began at this time continued their involvement with the music industry.

The August, 1985, issue #165, guest edited by Charles Ipcar, focused on housing and other neighborhood organizing songs. Songwriters included Langston Hughes, Charlie Ipcar & Maxine Parshall, Dale Cohen & Hugh McGuinness, Bob Norman, Mark Charles & Sheila Ritter, Peter Berryman, Elyse Crystall, Sandee Swantek, Martha Koester, Paul Emery, Tony Heriza, Judith Levine & Laura Liben, Mike Rawson, Bev Grant, and Luci Murphy.

Publication ended in the late 1980s.

== 2007 revival ==
As of 2007, Broadside Magazine is being revived online at broadsidemagazine.com. New articles are being featured by contributing writers and past editors, and all previous issues of the magazine are available for free download in PDF format.
