= Gordon Friesen =

American magazine founder (1909–1996)

Gordon Friesen (1909 - 1996) was a novelist and co-founder, along with his wife Agnes Sis Cunningham, of Broadside, the political song magazine that first published many of the most popular songs of the folk revival, including compositions by Bob Dylan and Phil Ochs.

Friesen was born March 3, 1909, in Weatherford, Oklahoma. He grew up in a Russian Mennonite family in Oklahoma, and was also an important early contributor to Mennonite literature. His novel Flamethrowers, which was critical of Mennonite traditions, is regarded as one of the earliest novels by an American Mennonite author about Mennonites.

Friesen and his wife Cunningham were also members of the Almanac Singers during the 1940s, a Greenwich Village urban folk music revival group with a shifting membership.

"At its peak, Broadside appeared monthly, but as the folk revival lost momentum, its publication dwindled to bimonthly and ultimately semi-annually by the end of the 1960s. Although its circulation never exceeded four figures, the Friesens kept Broadside afloat until 1988, publishing 187 issues in all."

In 1999, Cunningham published their collaborative memoir, Red Dust and Broadsides: A Joint Autobiography.

In 2000, Smithsonian Folkways Records collected the magazine’s most notable songs on the five-CD box set The Best of Broadside 1962-1988 .

Friesen died on October 15, 1996. He was born on March 3, 1909.
