= Mimi Fariña =

American musician and activist

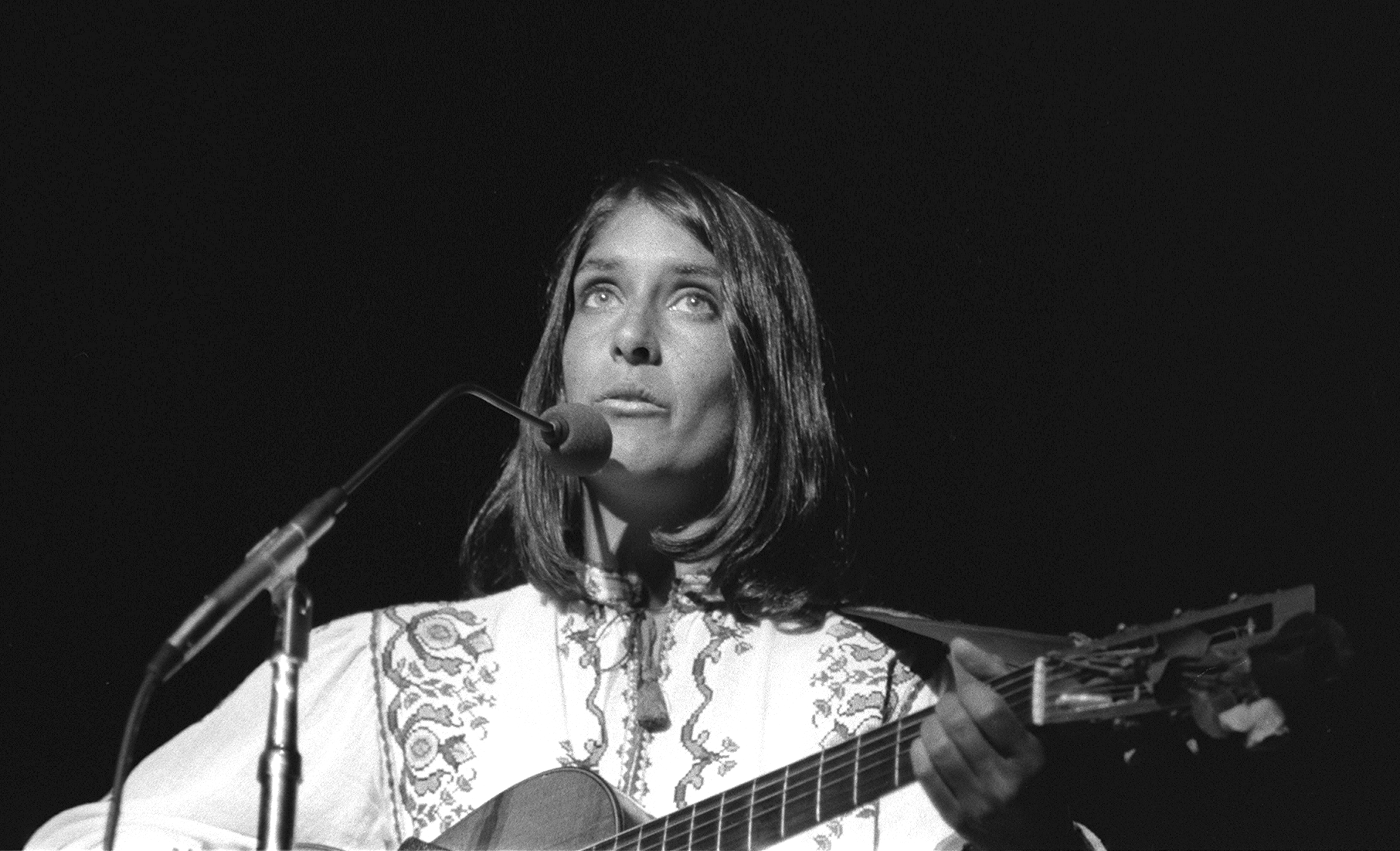
- Fariña playing at a benefit for Bread and Roses

Background information
- Born: Margarita Mimi Baez; April 30, 1945; Palo Alto, California, U.S.
- Died: July 18, 2001 (aged 56) Mill Valley, California, U.S.
- Genres: Folk; bluegrass; folk rock
- Occupations: Musician; songwriter; activist
- Instruments: Vocals; guitar
- Years active: 1963–2001
- Labels: Vanguard; Rounder
- Spouses: Richard Fariña (m. 1963; died 1966) Milan Melvin (m. 1968; div. 1971)

Margarita Mimi Baez Fariña (April 30, 1945 – July 18, 2001) was an American singer-songwriter and activist, the youngest of three daughters of mother Joan Chandos Bridge and Mexican-American physicist Albert Baez. She was the younger sister of the singer and activist Joan Baez.

== Career ==
=== Early years ===
Fariña's father, a physicist affiliated with Stanford University and MIT, moved his family frequently due to his job assignments, working in the United States and in international locations. She benefited from dance and music lessons, and took up the guitar, joining the 1960s American folk music revival.

Fariña met novelist, musician, and composer Richard Fariña (1937–1966) in 1963, when she was 17 years old, and married him at age 18 in Paris. The two collaborated on a number of influential folk albums, most notably, Celebrations for a Grey Day (1965) and Reflections in a Crystal Wind (1966), both on Vanguard Records. After Richard Fariña's death in a motorcycle accident on April 30, 1966 (on Mimi's twenty-first birthday), she moved to San Francisco, where she flourished as a singer, songwriter, model, actress, and activist. She performed at various festivals and clubs throughout the Bay Area, including the Big Sur Folk Festivals, the Matrix, and the hungry i. Fariña briefly sang for the rock group the Only Alternative and His Other Possibilities. In 1967, Fariña joined a satiric comedy troupe called The Committee. That same year, she and her sister Joan Baez were arrested at a peaceful demonstration and were housed temporarily in Santa Rita Jail, personalizing the experience of captivity for her. In 1968, Fariña married Milan Melvin and continued to perform, sometimes recording and touring with either her sister Joan or the folksinger Tom Jans, with whom she recorded an album in 1971, entitled Take Heart. Fariña and Milan divorced in 1971.

Among the songs she wrote is "In the Quiet Morning (for Janis Joplin)", which her sister recorded and released in 1972 on the album Come from the Shadows. The song is also included on a number of compilations, including Joan Baez's Greatest Hits.

By 1973, Fariña was asked to accompany her sister Joan and B.B. King when they performed for the prisoners in Sing Sing Prison. This experience, along with her arrest in 1967, led her to a desire to do more for those who are held in institutions.

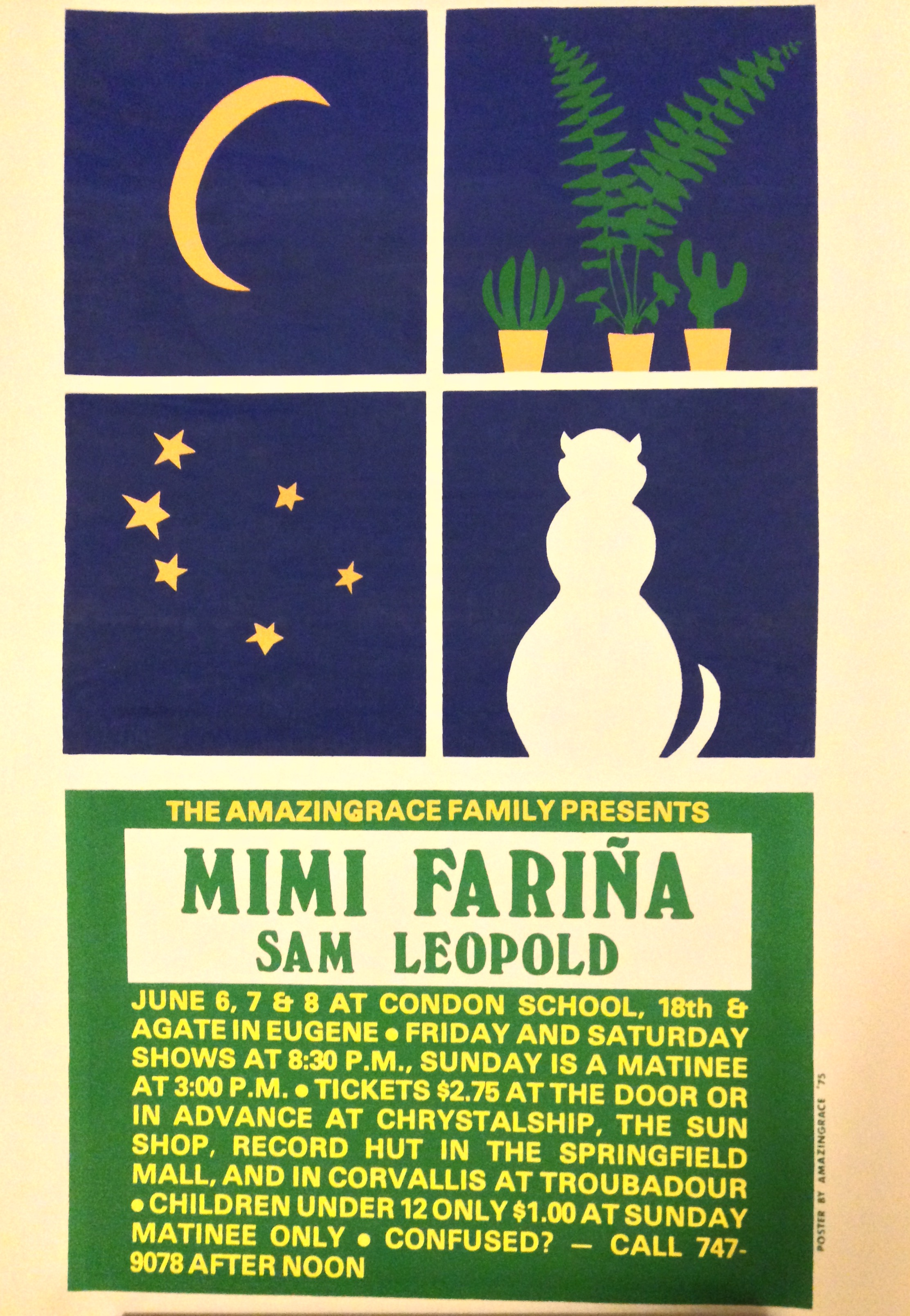
Poster for Mimi Fariña concert held at Condon School in Oregon in June 1975.

== Bread and Roses ==
In 1974, Fariña founded Bread and Roses, now known as Bread and Roses Presents. The organization's name came from "Bread and Roses", a 1912 poem by James Oppenheim, which is commonly associated with a 1912 garment workers strike in Lawrence, Massachusetts. Farina had just set the poem to a new tune she composed, which was an instant success, becoming the favorite of many subsequent singers, including Judy Collins, Ani DiFranco, Utah Phillips, and Josh Lucker, and it was also performed by a slowly growing crowd of workers in a moving/critical turning point scene in the 2014 movie Pride.

Bread and Roses is in its fifth decade as a non-profit organization, bringing free live music and entertainment to children, adults, and seniors who are isolated in institutional settings: children's day care and special needs schools, hospitals, adult and juvenile detention facilities, homeless shelters, adult recovery centers, senior day and convalescent homes. Bread and Roses serves isolated audiences in eight counties in the San Francisco Bay Area, and consults with other like-minded programs nationally. In 2019, Bread and Roses brought performers to play more than 600 concerts in over 120 institutions.

Though she continued to sing in her later years, releasing an album in 1985 and performing sporadically, Fariña devoted most of her time to running Bread and Roses. In the late 1980s, she teamed with Pete Sears to play a variety of benefit and protest concerts. Many concerts were concerned with human rights issues in Central America, especially the U.S.-backed civil wars in Guatemala and El Salvador. They once set up to play on the abandoned railroad tracks outside the Concord Naval Weapons Center in California. Surrounded by military police, Fariña and Sears played a show for people protesting U.S. weapons being shipped to government troops in El Salvador.

In 1985, she recorded her own album Mimi Fariña Solo. Bread and Roses also has a CD—produced by Banana, aka Lowell Levinger, with Michael Kleff—of a series of concerts that she gave with Banana in Germany in the 1980s.

Fariña used her connections with the folk-singing community to elicit help in supporting Bread and Roses. Their concert events featured many friends and musicians including Pete Seeger, Paul Winter, Odetta, Hoyt Axton, Judy Collins, Taj Mahal, Lily Tomlin, Carlos Santana, Bonnie Raitt, Robin Williams, Jackson Browne, Joni Mitchell, The Roches, Maria Muldaur, Rickie Lee Jones, Country Joe McDonald, Boz Scaggs, Malvina Reynolds, Paul Simon, Elizabeth Cotten, Van Morrison, Kris Kristofferson, Leonard Cohen, Arlo Guthrie, Jerry Garcia, Peter Coyote, Rob Reiner, Peter Rowan, Graham Nash, Father Guido Sarducci and others.

== Death and legacy ==
Fariña died of neuroendocrine cancer at her home in Mill Valley, California, on July 18, 2001, at age 56. A memorial service was held on August 7 at Grace Cathedral in San Francisco. 1,200 people attended.

The life of Mimi Fariña is partially chronicled in David Hajdu's book Positively 4th Street. She is alluded to in the Armistead Maupin novel Tales of the City, set in San Francisco in the 1970s, and she appeared in a cameo role in the 1993 miniseries based on the novel. She also was the subject of sister Joan Baez' 1969 song "Sweet Sir Galahad".

She appears in the 2012 documentary Greenwich Village: Music That Defined a Generation and the 2023 documentary Joan Baez: I Am a Noise.

== Selected discography ==
- 1965: Celebrations for a Grey Day with Richard Fariña, Vanguard Records
- 1966: Reflections in a Crystal Wind with Richard Fariña, Vanguard Records
- 1968: Memories with Richard Fariña, Vanguard Records
- 1971: Take Heart with Tom Jans, A&M Records
- 1985: Mimi Farina Solo, Rounder Records
- 2001: The Complete Vanguard Recordings with Richard Fariña, Vanguard Records
- 2018: Mimi Fariña with Lowell Levinger (Banana from The Youngbloods) Grandpa Raccoon Records
