= Donovan discography =

Cataloguing of published recordings by Donovan

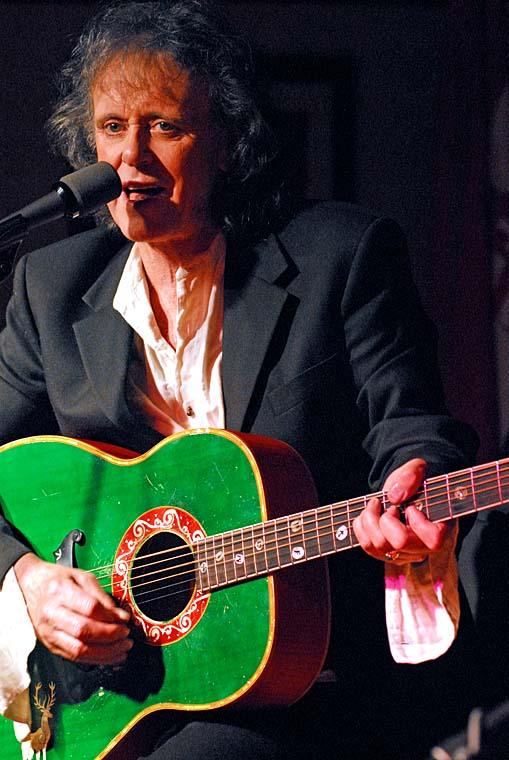
- Donovan performing in Washington, D.C. on 10 August 2007.
- Studio albums: 29
- Live albums: 8
- Compilation albums: 62
- Tribute albums: 5
- Singles: 33

This is the discography of Scottish singer, songwriter and guitarist Donovan.

== Albums ==
=== Studio albums ===
| Title | Album details | Peak chart positions | | | Certifications |
| Title | Album details | UK | AUS | US | Certifications |
|---|---|---|---|---|---|
| What's Bin Did and What's Bin Hid (UK title) / Catch the Wind (US title) | Released May 1965 (UK), June 1965 (US); Label: Pye (UK), Hickory (US) | 3 | – | – | 30 |
| Fairytale | Released October 1965 (UK), November 1965 (US); Label: Pye (UK) / Hickory (US) | 20 | – | 85 | |
| Sunshine Superman (US) | Released August 1966; Label: Epic | – | – | 11 | |
| Mellow Yellow (US) | Released February 1967; Label: Epic | – | – | 14 | |
| Sunshine Superman (UK) | Released October 1967; Label: Pye | 25 | – | – | |
| A Gift from a Flower to a Garden | Released December 1967 (US), April 1968 (UK); Label: Epic (US), Pye (UK) | 13 | – | 19 | RIAA: Gold |
| Wear Your Love Like Heaven (Record one of A Gift from a Flower to a Garden) | Released December 1967; Label: Epic | – | – | 60 | |
| For Little Ones (Record two of A Gift from a Flower to a Garden) | Released December 1967; Label: Epic | – | – | 185 | |
| The Hurdy Gurdy Man | Released October 1968; Label: Epic | – | – | 20 | |
| Barabajagal | Released August 1969; Label: Epic | – | – | 23 | |
| Open Road | Released July 1970 (US), September 1970 (UK); Label: Epic (US), Dawn (UK) | 30 | 13 | 16 | |
| HMS Donovan | Released July 1971; Label: Dawn | – | – | – | |
| Cosmic Wheels | Released March 1973; Label: Epic | 15 | 22 | 25 | |
| Essence to Essence | Released December 1973; Label: Epic | – | 23 | 174 | |
| 7-Tease | Released November 1974 (US), January 1975 (UK); Label: Epic | – | 67 | 135 | |
| Slow Down World | Released May 1976 (US), June 1976 (UK); Label: Epic | – | – | 174 | |
| Donovan | Released August 1977 (US), October 1977 (UK); Label Arista (US), Rak (UK) | – | – | – | |
| Neutronica | Released August 1980; Label Barclay (France), RCA (Germany) | – | – | – | |
| Love Is Only Feeling | Released 1981; Label: RCA | – | – | – | |
| Lady of the Stars | Released January 1984; Label: RCA (UK), Allegiance (US) | – | – | – | |
| One Night in Time | Released 1993 | – | – | – | |
| The Children of Lir (Credited to Brian O'Reilly Special Guest Donovan)) | Released 1994; Label: Fiona | – | – | – | |
| Sutras | Released 1996; Label: American | – | – | – | |
| The Fairy Tales of Hermann Hesse (Audiobook) | Released 1998; Label: Audio Literature | – | – | – | |
| Pied Piper | Released 2002; Label: Music For Little People | – | – | – | |
| Sixty Four: The Donovan Archive Volume 1 | Released February 2004; Label: Donovan Discs | – | – | – | |
| Beat Cafe | Released 2004; Label: Appleseed | – | – | – | |
| Brother Sun, Sister Moon | Released April 2005; Label: iTunes | – | – | – | |
| Ritual Groove | Released October 2010; Label: Donovan Discs | – | – | – | |
| Shadows of Blue | Released 2013; Label: Treasure Isle Records | – | – | – | |
| Gaelia (The Sulan Sessions) | Released 2022; Label: Donovan Discs | – | – | – | |
"—" denotes a recording that did not chart or was not released in that territory.

=== Live albums ===
| Title | Album details | Peak chart positions | | |
| Title | Album details | UK | CAN | US |
|---|---|---|---|---|
| Donovan in Concert | Released 1968; Label: Epic | — | 30 | 18 |
| Live in Japan: Spring Tour 1973 | Released 1973; Label: Epic | — | — | — |
| Live in Tokyo '73 | Released 17 March 1973; Label: Dirty 13 | — | — | — |
| Rising | Released November 1990; Label: Permanent | — | — | — |
| Live in Concert | Released 1992; Label: QED | — | — | — |
| Donovan in Concert | Released 27 April 1998; Label: Going for a Song | — | — | — |
| Rising Again | Released 22 May 2001; Label: Pilot | — | — | — |
| Greatest Hits Live: Vancouver 1986 | Released 2 October 2001; Label: Varèse Sarabande | — | — | — |
"—" denotes a recording that did not chart or was not released in that territory.

=== Compilation albums ===
| Title | Album details | Peak chart positions | | | | | Certifications |
| Title | Album details | SCO | CAN | GER | UK | US | Certifications |
|---|---|---|---|---|---|---|---|
| The Real Donovan | Released November 1967; Label: Hickory | — | — | — | — | 96 | |
| Universal Soldier | Released September 1967; Label: Pye | — | — | — | 5 | — | |
| Like It Is, Was, and Evermore Shall Be | Released September 1967; Label: Hickory | — | — | — | — | 177 | |
| Donovan's Greatest Hits | Released January 1969; Label: Epic | — | 2 | — | — | 4 | MC: Gold; RIAA: Platinum |
| The Best of Donovan | Released November 1969; Label: Hickory | — | — | — | — | 135 | |
| Donovan P. Leitch | Released October 1970; Label: Hickory | — | — | — | — | 128 | |
| Catch the Wind | Released 1971; Label: Hallmark | — | — | — | — | — | |
| Colours | Released 1972; Label: Hallmark | — | — | — | — | — | |
| Early Treasures | Released 1973; Label: Bell | — | — | — | — | — | |
| This is Donovan (West Germany) | Released 1974; Label: Epic | — | — | — | — | — | |
| Donovan File | Released 1977; Label: Pye | — | — | — | — | — | |
| Spotlight on Donovan | Released 1981; Label: PRT | — | — | — | — | — | |
| The World of Donovan | Released 1982 | — | — | — | — | — | |
| Minstrel Boy | Released: 1983; Label: PRT | — | — | — | — | — | |
| Catch the Wind | Released April 1986; Label: Showcase | — | — | — | — | — | |
| Donovan's Greatest Hits and More | Released September 1989; Label: EMI | — | — | — | — | — | BPI: Silver |
| The Collection | Released December 1990; Label: Castle Communications | — | — | — | — | — | |
| Colours | Released 1991; Label: Del Rack | — | — | — | — | — | |
| Troubadour: The Definitive Collection 1964–1976 | Released 4 August 1992; Label: Epic, Legacy | — | — | — | — | — | |
| The Early Years | Released March 1993; Label: Dojo | — | — | — | — | — | |
| Wonderful Music of Donovan | Released 1993; Label: Remember | — | — | — | — | — | |
| Peace and Love Songs | Released: 1996; Label: Sony Special Products | — | — | — | — | — | |
| Mellow | Released 1 November 1997; Label: Recall | — | — | — | — | — | |
| Love Is Hot, Truth Is Molten | Released 7 April 1998; Label: Raven | — | — | — | — | — | |
| The Definitive Collection | Released July 1998; Label: Epic | — | — | — | — | — | |
| Atlantis Calling | Released 1999; Label: Rockartoons | — | — | — | — | — | |
| Summer Day Reflection Songs | Released 25 April 2000; Label: Castle | — | — | — | — | — | |
| Sunshine Superman: The Very Best of Donovan | Released 8 October 2002; Label: EMI | 57 | — | — | 47 | — | BPI: Silver |
| Storyteller | Released: 16 September 2003; Label: Audio Fidelity | — | — | — | — | — | |
| The Essential Donovan (1-CD version) | Released 30 March 2004; Label: Legacy Recordings | — | — | — | — | — | |
| The Essential Donovan (2-CD version) | Released 17 April 2012; Label: Legacy Recordings | — | — | — | — | — | |
| Try for the Sun: The Journey of Donovan | Released 13 September 2005; Label: Epic, Legacy | — | — | — | — | — | |
| Eco-Song | Released 2019; Label: Donovan Discs | — | — | — | — | — | |
"—" denotes a recording that did not chart or was not released in that territory.

=== Tribute albums ===
- Donovan My Way (Vic Lewis and his Orchestra) (1968)
- The Les Williams Orchestra Plays the Songs of Donovan (1968)
- The Golden Songs of Donovan Johnny Arthy Orchestra
- Island of Circles (1992)
- A Gift from a Garden to a Flower: A Tribute to Donovan (2002)
- Gazing with Tranquility: A Tribute to Donovan (2015)

== EPs ==
| Title | Album details | Peak chart positions | |
| Title | Album details | UK | NL |
|---|---|---|---|
| The Universal Soldier | Released: 13 August 1965; Label: Pye; Formats: EP | 1 | 8 |

== Singles ==
| Title | Year | Peak chart positions | | | | | | | | | | Certifications | Album |
| Title | Year | UK | AUS | AUT | BEL Fla | BEL Wal | GER | NL | SWI | US | US Cash | Certifications | Album |
|---|---|---|---|---|---|---|---|---|---|---|---|---|---|
| "Catch the Wind" | 1965 | 4 | 5 | — | — | — | — | — | — | 23 | 28 | | What's Bin Did and What's Bin Hid |
| "Colours" | 1965 | 4 | 81 | — | — | 42 | — | 8 | — | 61 | 40 | | Fairytale |
| "Universal Soldier" | 1965 | — | 13 | — | — | — | — | 9 | — | 53 | 45 | | The Universal Soldier EP |
| "Turquoise" | 1965 | 30 | — | — | — | — | — | — | — | — | — | | Non-album single |
| "Sunshine Superman" | 1966 | 2 | 4 | — | 11 | 19 | 7 | 2 | — | 1 | 1 | | Sunshine Superman |
| "Mellow Yellow" | 1966 | 8 | 8 | 12 | 7 | 6 | 16 | 12 | — | 2 | 3 | RIAA: Gold | Mellow Yellow |
| "Epistle to Dippy" | 1967 | — | 53 | 19 | — | 37 | — | — | — | 19 | 10 | | Non-album singles |
| "There Is a Mountain" | 1967 | 8 | 25 | — | — | 15 | — | — | — | 11 | 9 | | Non-album singles |
| "Wear Your Love Like Heaven" | 1967 | — | 61 | — | — | — | — | — | — | 23 | 26 | | A Gift from a Flower to a Garden |
| "Jennifer Juniper" | 1968 | 5 | 16 | 10 | — | 18 | 13 | 19 | — | 26 | 18 | | The Hurdy Gurdy Man |
| "Hurdy Gurdy Man" | 1968 | 4 | 5 | 20 | 12 | 10 | 11 | 7 | 5 | 5 | 3 | | The Hurdy Gurdy Man |
| "Laléna" | 1968 | — | 71 | — | — | 42 | — | — | — | 33 | 31 | | Non-album single |
| "Atlantis" | 1968 | 23 | 15 | 4 | 9 | 17 | 2 | 1 | 1 | 7 | 9 | | Barabajagal |
| "To Susan on the West Coast, Waiting" | 1968 | — | — | — | — | 17 | — | — | — | 35 | 31 | | Barabajagal |
| "Barabajagal" (with Jeff Beck) | 1969 | 12 | 28 | 17 | — | 31 | — | 23 | — | 36 | 28 | | Barabajagal |
| "Riki Tiki Tavi" | 1970 | — | — | — | — | 37 | — | — | — | 55 | 40 | | Open Road |
| "Celia of the Seals" | 1971 | — | 60 | — | — | 50 | — | — | — | 84 | 93 | | HMS Donovan |
| "I Like You" | 1973 | — | 67 | 5 | — | — | — | — | — | 66 | 57 | | Cosmic Wheels |
| "Maria Magenta" | 1973 | — | — | — | — | — | — | — | — | — | — | | Cosmic Wheels |
| "Sailing Homeward" | 1974 | — | — | — | — | — | — | — | — | — | — | | Essence to Essence |
| "Rock 'n' Roll with Me" | 1974 | — | — | — | — | — | — | — | — | — | — | | Non-album single |
| "Rock and Roll Souljer" | 1975 | — | — | — | — | — | — | — | — | — | — | | 7-Tease |
| "Salvation Stomp" | 1975 | — | — | — | — | — | — | 19 | — | — | — | | 7-Tease |
| "Dare to Be Different" | 1977 | — | — | — | — | — | — | — | — | — | — | | Donovan |
| "The Light" | 1977 | — | — | — | — | — | — | — | — | — | — | | Donovan |
| "Mee Mee, I Love You" | 1981 | — | — | — | — | — | — | — | — | — | — | | Neutronica |
| "Neutron" | 1981 | — | — | — | — | — | — | — | — | — | — | | Neutronica |
| "Lay Down Lassie" | 1982 | — | — | — | — | — | — | — | — | — | — | | Love Is Only Feeling |
| "Newest Bath Guide" | 1992 | — | — | — | — | — | — | — | — | — | — | | Non-album single |
| "Please Don't Bend" | 1996 | — | — | — | — | — | — | — | — | — | — | | Sutras |
| "Atlantis" / "When the Angels Sing" (with No Angels) | 2001 | — | — | 5 | — | — | 5 | — | 16 | — | — | | Now... Us! / Elle'ments |
| "Cherchez l'erreur" (duet with Zouzou) | 2009 | — | — | — | — | — | — | — | — | — | — | | Non-album singles |
| "Is This the Last Time?" | 2009 | — | — | — | — | — | — | — | — | — | — | | Non-album singles |
| "Banks O' Doon" | 2009 | — | — | — | — | — | — | — | — | — | — | | Non-album singles |
| "I Am the Shaman" | 2010 | — | — | — | — | — | — | — | — | — | — | | Ritual Groove |
| "Save the World" | 2010 | — | — | — | — | — | — | — | — | — | — | | Ritual Groove |
| "Christmas Time Is Here Again" (with Violet Lawrence) | 2010 | — | — | — | — | — | — | — | — | — | — | | Non-album single |
| "To Love You" | 2013 | — | — | — | — | — | — | — | — | — | — | | Shadows of Blue |
| "Jump in the Line" | 2019 | — | — | — | — | — | — | — | — | — | — | | Jump in the Line: A Tribute to Harry Belafonte |
| "Still Waters" | 2021 | — | — | — | — | — | — | — | — | — | — | | Lunarian |
| "To Love You" | 2021 | — | — | — | — | — | — | — | — | — | — | | Lunarian |
| "I Am the Shaman" | 2021 | — | — | — | — | — | — | — | — | — | — | | Non-album singles |
| "Gimme Some a That" | 2021 | — | — | — | — | — | — | — | — | — | — | | Non-album singles |
"—" denotes a recording that did not chart or was not released in that territory.
