= Donovan's Greatest Hits and More =

Compilation album by Donovan
- Released: September 1989
- Recorded: 1966–1969
- Genre: rock
- Label: EMI
- Producer: Mickie Most, Donovan

Donovan chronology
Colours (1987)	Donovan's Greatest Hits and More (1989)

Professional ratings
Review scores
Source	Rating
AllMusic	3/5 stars
Q	3/5 stars

Donovan's Greatest Hits and More is a compilation album from Scottish singer-songwriter Donovan. It was released in the United Kingdom (EMI CDP 1462 [CD]; EMI EMS 1333 [LP]) in September 1989.

== History ==
In the late 1980s, Epic Records and EMI Records began releasing Donovan's music on compact disc for the first time. In the United Kingdom, EMI added several tracks to Donovan's Greatest Hits, shuffled the track order and added several songs from Barabajagal as well as four b-sides that had not yet been released on an album. The album's cover art depicted a photograph from the same photo session that produced the album cover for Wear Your Love Like Heaven.

Even after Troubadour: The Definitive Collection 1964-1976 reintroduced "Poor Cow" and "Teen Angel", "Preachin' Love" and "Aye My Love" were unique to Donovan's Greatest Hits and More until they were included as bonus tracks on the 2005 remastered versions of Mellow Yellow and The Hurdy Gurdy Man.

== Track listing ==
All tracks by Donovan Leitch.

1. "Sunshine Superman" – 4:34
2. "Wear Your Love Like Heaven" – 2:25
3. "Jennifer Juniper" – 2:42
4. "Barabajagal (Love Is Hot)" – 3:19
5. "Hurdy Gurdy Man" – 3:17
6. "Epistle to Dippy" – 3:12
7. "To Susan on the West Coast Waiting" – 3:13
8. "Catch the Wind" – 5:03
9. "Mellow Yellow" – 3:41
10. "There Is a Mountain" – 2:36
11. "Happiness Runs" – 3:26
12. "Season of the Witch" – 4:56
13. "Colours" – 4:12
14. "Superlungs My Supergirl" – 2:41
15. "Laléna" – 2:56
16. "Atlantis" – 5:03
17. "Preachin' Love" – 2:40
18. "Poor Cow" – 2:57
19. "Teen Angel" – 2:19
20. "Aye My Love" – 2:03

== Personnel ==
- Tim Chacksfield – project coordinator
- Peter Doggett – liner notes, story
- Lorne Murdoch – liner notes, story
- Phil Smee – package design

== Certifications ==
Region	Certification	Certified units/sales
United Kingdom (BPI)	Silver	60,000^{‡}
^{‡} Sales+streaming figures based on certification alone.
