= The Essential Donovan =

2004 compilation album by Donovan

Greatest hits album by Donovan
- Released: 17 April 2012
- Genre: Pop rock
- Length: 2:02:53
- Labels: Sony; Legacy

Donovan chronology
Playlist: The Very Best of Donovan (2008)	The Essential Donovan (2012)	Breezes of Patchouli: His Studio Recordings 1966-1969 (2013)

The Essential Donovan is a greatest hits album by the Scottish musician Donovan. Originally released in 2004, it was re-released to higher acclaim as a part of Sony Legacy's Essential series in 2012.

== Release ==
The album was released to coincide with Donovan's induction into the Rock and Roll Hall of Fame.

== Critical reception ==
Professional ratings
Review scores
Source	Rating
AllMusic (2004)	3.75/5 stars
AllMusic (2012)	4.5/5 stars
American Songwriter	4/5 stars
The Rolling Stone Album Guide	4/5 stars

In a review for the original 2004 issue, AllMusic's John Bush states that it "merely reissues Donovan's Greatest Hits"; he notes that "the music is obviously excellent, beginning with Donovan's wistful debut 'Catch the Wind' and progressing through his psychedelic pop hits of the late '60s, but Donovan's Greatest Hits presents the same material with perspective and a flair that this series compilation lacks."

Reviewing the 2012 reissue, AllMusic's Stephen Thomas Erlewine states that the album is "perhaps better compared to the 1992 box Troubadour: The Definitive Collection, another two-CD set that delved deeply into Donovan's career", going on to state that the album "emphasizes Donovan's psychedelic mod hipster side over his wannabe Dylan folkie". Joe Marchese of The Second Disc stated the album is a "poetic rumination of diverse images that come together as a portrait of youth", going on to state the album's first disc includes "ten songs that truly made psychedelia mainstream."

== Track listing ==
=== Original version ===
1. Catch the Wind – 2:55
2. Colours – 2:55
3. Sunshine Superman – 4:40
4. Season of the Witch – 4:55
5. Mellow Yellow – 3:42
6. Epistle to Dippy – 3:10
7. There Is a Mountain – 2:34
8. Wear Your Love Like Heaven – 2:24
9. Jennifer Juniper – 2:42
10. Hurdy Gurdy Man – 3:19
11. Laléna – 2:54
12. To Susan on the West Coast Waiting – 3:11
13. Atlantis – 4:57
14. Barabajagal – 3:20

=== Double-disc re-release version ===
==== Disc One ====
1. Catch the Wind (single version) – 2:18
2. Colours – 2:55
3. Summer Day Reflection Song – 2:10
4. Universal Soldier – 2:16
5. You're Gonna Need Somebody on Your Bond – 4:04
6. Turquoise – 3:32
7. Sunshine Superman (extended version) – 4:34
8. The Trip (single version) – 4:34
9. Legend of a Girl Child Linda – 6:50
10. Season of the Witch – 4:55
11. Ferris Wheel – 4:12
12. Mellow Yellow – 3:42
13. Young Girl Blues – 3:45
14. Museum – 2:54
15. Hampstead Incident – 4:41
16. Sunny South Kensington – 3:48
17. The Land of Doesn't Have to Be (early version) – 2:43
18. Epistle to Dippy – 3:10

==== Disc Two ====
1. There Is a Mountain – 2:34
2. Wear Your Love Like Heaven – 2:24
3. Sun – 3:13
4. Isle of Islay – 2:20
5. Sunny Goodge Street (Live) – 2:55
6. Sand and Foam (Live) – 3:19
7. Jennifer Juniper – 2:42
8. Hurdy Gurdy Man – 3:19
9. Get Thy Bearings – 2:47
10. Laléna – 2:54
11. To Susan on the West Coast Waiting – 3:11
12. Atlantis – 4:57
13. Barabajagal (Love Is Hot) (with the Jeff Beck Group) – 3:20
14. Happiness Runs – 3:25
15. Riki Tiki Tavi – 2:55
16. Celia of the Seals – 3:02
17. I Like You – 5:10
18. Hey Gyp (Dig the Slowness) (Live) – 2:45
