= Troubadour: The Definitive Collection 1964–1976 =

Troubadour – The Definitive Collection 1964–1976

Compilation album by Donovan
- Released: 4 August 1992
- Recorded: 1964–1976
- Genre: Folk
- Length: 150:44
- Label: Epic (US); Legacy (US)
- Producer: Terry Kennedy; Peter Eden; Geoff Stephens; Mickie Most; Donovan

Donovan chronology
Island of Circles (1992)	Troubadour – The Definitive Collection 1964–1976 (1992)	One Night in Time (1993)

Professional ratings
Review scores
Source	Rating
AllMusic	4.5/5 stars

Troubadour: The Definitive Collection 1964–1976 is the first CD boxed set from Scottish singer-songwriter Donovan, released in the US (Epic/Legacy E2K 46986) on 4 August 1992. It was originally released as a two CD set in a long box. The long box also contained a picture booklet. In 1995, it was released again without the long box and picture booklet.

== History ==
By the early 1990s, CDs were fast becoming the standard format for music. This provided a challenge for artists such as Donovan, whose entire catalog had been issued on vinyl. To rectify the situation, many record companies released CD boxed sets. These boxed sets allowed a more in-depth view than traditional greatest hits or best of compilations. Like greatest hits and best of collections, many of the boxed sets also included rare or previously unreleased recordings as a purchasing incentive for fans who may already have earlier albums.

In a mutually beneficial move for both record company and artist, Epic Records released Troubadour – The Definitive Collection 1964–1976 in 1992. The two-disc boxed set features almost all of Donovan's charting singles, many album tracks, and several rare and unreleased tracks. Troubadour – The Definitive Collection 1964–1976 helped put Donovan back in the minds of his older fans, and helped acquaint more recent generations with his music.

== The Great Donovan ==
The Great Donovan, by Rajon Records (AUS)

On 25 November 2003, Australian record label Rajon Records (Rajon 50198) released the compilation under the title The Great Donovan spread out over three discs. This collection omits the "Riki Tiki Tavi" outtake included on Troubadour: The Definitive Collection 1964–1976.

== Track listing ==
All tracks are written by Donovan Leitch, except where noted.

Disk One
No.	Title	Writer(s)	Length
1.	"London Town" (previously unreleased song from Donovan's 1964 demo tape, later released on Sixty Four)	Tim Hardin	04:05
2.	"Codine" (previously unreleased song from Donovan's 1964 demo tape, later released on Sixty Four)	Buffy Sainte-Marie	04:47
3.	"Catch the Wind" (single version with strings, released 28 February 1965)		02:53
4.	"Universal Soldier" (from Universal Soldier, released 15 August 1965)	Buffy Sainte-Marie	02:11
5.	"Colours" (from Fairytale, released 22 October 1965)		02:43
6.	"Sunshine Superman" (from Sunshine Superman, released September 1966)		03:14
7.	"Season of the Witch" (from Sunshine Superman)		04:55
8.	"The Trip" (from Sunshine Superman)		04:34
9.	"Guinevere" (from Sunshine Superman)		03:41
10.	"Breezes of Patchulie" (previously unreleased song from the Sunshine Superman sessions)		04:34
11.	"Museum" (previously unreleased alternate version of the Mellow Yellow track from the Sunshine Superman sessions)		02:51
12.	"Super Lungs" (previously unreleased alternate version of the Barabajagal track from the Sunshine Superman sessions)		03:16
13.	"Mellow Yellow" (singe A-side, released Nov 1966)		03:40
14.	"Writer in the Sun" (from Mellow Yellow)		04:28
15.	"Sand and Foam" (from Mellow Yellow)		03:18
16.	"Sunny South Kensington" (from Mellow Yellow)		03:47
17.	"Epistle to Dippy" (from Epistle to Dippy / Preachin' Love, released February 1967)		03:09
18.	"There Is a Mountain" (from There Is a Mountain / Sand and Foam, released August 1967)		02:33
19.	"Wear Your Love Like Heaven" (from A Gift from a Flower to a Garden, released December 1967)		02:24
20.	"Oh Gosh" (from A Gift from a Flower to a Garden)		01:45
21.	"The Tinker and the Crab" (from A Gift from a Flower to a Garden)		02:52
22.	"Poor Cow" (from Jennifer Juniper / Poor Cow, released February 1968)		02:57

All tracks are written by Donovan Leitch.

Disk Two
No.	Title	Length
1.	"The Hurdy Gurdy Man" (1968 single)	03:13
2.	"Jennifer Juniper" (from The Hurdy Gurdy Man)	02:40
3.	"Teen Angel" (from "Hurdy Gurdy Man" / "Teen Angel", released May 1968)	02:17
4.	"Laléna" (from "Laléna" / "Aye My Love", released October 1968)	02:56
5.	"To Susan on the West Coast Waiting" (from Barabajagal, released 11 August 1969)	03:11
6.	"Atlantis" (from Barabajagal)	05:00
7.	"Barabajagal" (from Barabajagal)	03:18
8.	"Happiness Runs" (from Barabajagal)	03:25
9.	"Celia of the Seals" (from H.M.S. Donovan, released July 1971)	02:59
10.	"Riki Tiki Tavi" (single version, from Open Road, released August 1970)	02:56
11.	"Clara Clairvoyant" (from Open Road)	02:50
12.	"Roots of Oak" (from Open Road)	05:03
13.	"Riki Tiki Tavi" (alternate version of the Open Road track)	04:42
14.	"Maria Magenta" (from Cosmic Wheels, released March 1973)	02:11
15.	"Cosmic Wheels" (from Cosmic Wheels)	04:01
16.	"I Like You" (single version of Cosmic Wheels track)	04:34
17.	"Yellow Star" (from Essence to Essence, released December 1973)	03:04
18.	"Rock and Roll Souljer" (from 7-Tease, released November 1974)	03:49
19.	"The Quest" (from 7-Tease)	03:30
20.	"Age of Treason" (previously unreleased song from the 7-Tease sessions)	04:20
21.	"What the Soul Desires" (previously unreleased song from the 7-Tease sessions)	02:33
22.	"Dark-Eyed Blue Jean Angel" (from Slow Down World, released May 1976)	03:47
