= Sunshine Superman: The Very Best of Donovan =

Greatest hits album by Donovan
- Released: 8 October 2002
- Recorded: 1965–1969
- Genre: folk, rock
- Label: EMI

Donovan chronology
| The Very Best of Donovan: The Early Years (2002) | Sunshine Superman: The Very Best of Donovan (2002) | Atlantis (2002) |

Professional ratings
Review scores
| Source | Rating |
|---|---|
| Allmusic | 4/5 stars |

Sunshine Superman: The Very Best of Donovan is a compilation album from Scottish singer-songwriter Donovan. It was released on 8 October 2002 (EMI 540777).

== History ==
In 2002, EMI assembled a compilation of Donovan's recordings from the 1960s and titled it Sunshine Superman: The Very Best of Donovan. This compilation has little in common with any of Donovan's other albums titled Sunshine Superman and little in common with any of Donovan's other albums titled The Best of Donovan and The Very Best of Donovan.

== Track listing ==
All tracks by Donovan Leitch.

1. "Sunshine Superman" – 4:33
2. "Mellow Yellow" – 3:39
3. "Catch the Wind" – 2:55
4. "There Is a Mountain" – 2:35
5. "Colours" – 2:45
6. "Jennifer Juniper" – 2:42
7. "The Trip" – 4:34
8. "Sunny Goodge Street" – 2:55
9. "Happiness Runs" – 3:25
10. "Poor Cow" – 2:57
11. "Preachin' Love" – 2:40
12. "Hurdy Gurdy Man" – 3:13
13. "Superlungs My Supergirl" – 2:40
14. "Season of the Witch" – 4:55
15. "Turquoise" – 3:30
16. "Epistle to Dippy" – 3:10
17. "Sand and Foam" – 3:19
18. "Atlantis" – 4:59
19. "Guinevere" – 3:40
20. "Wear Your Love Like Heaven" – 2:24
21. "Barabajagal (Love Is Hot)" – 3:21
22. "Laléna" – 2:54
