= Gazing with Tranquility: A Tribute to Donovan =

Compilation album by various artists
- Released: 16 October 2015
- Genre: various
- Length: 56:46
- Label: Rock the Cause
- Producer: Rosemary Svenpladsen; Scott Herold

Singles from Gazing with Tranquility: A Tribute to Donovan
- 1. "Happiness Runs" Released: 15 August 2015; 2. "Teen Angel" Released: 15 September 2015

Gazing with Tranquility: A Tribute to Donovan is a tribute album to the music of Scottish musician Donovan, released on 16 October 2015, by Rock the Cause. Proceeds of the album went to Huntington's Hope, a charity that gives children with Huntington's disease financial support.

== Songs ==
The covers on Gazing with Tranquility: A Tribute to Donovan include a Flaming Lips cover of "Atlantis" from Donovan's album Barabajagal. The covers of "Happiness Runs" and "Teen Angel" were released as singles on August 15, 2015, and September 15, 2015, respectively.

== Critical reception ==
Professional ratings
Review scores
| Source | Rating |
|---|---|
| AllMusic | 3.5/5 stars |

AllMusic critic Marcy Donelson wrote that it "features an indie-strong selection of 15 musical acts", noting that "Interpretations are varied and include a rock/hip-hop/gospel-inspired version of 'Atlantic' by ex-Replacements drummer Chris Mars as Mixd Up Kidz, an expectedly trippy take on the same song by the Flaming Lips, Van Etten's delay- and wind chimes-juiced "Teen Angel," and a sultry and dramatic "Lalena" by Eau Claire, Wisconsin-native singer/songwriter Savannah Smith", concluding by stating that "Faithful versions include Colony House's "Sunshine Superman" and a sweetly harmonized "Catch the Wind" by Ivan & Alyosha." In an NPR review, Tom Moon notes that "Deep into Gazing With Tranquility, tucked between smart and sometimes overly reverent reinterpretations of Donovan's hits, there's a small performance that illustrates the value of the tribute record", oping that "That song is "Lalena," a 1968 single that's notable for its dirge-like tempo and Donovan's steady, symmetrical vibrato" commenting that "While keeping the track intimate in scale, Smith somehow enlarges "Lalena," in ways that foster appreciation for the composition and the composer, who is frequently dismissed as a lightweight", he concludes in his review that "they've learned, through their own work, just how difficult it is to conjure. Donovan himself said it best: Might as well try to catch the wind."

== Track listing ==
CD
| No. | Title | Cover artist | Length |
|---|---|---|---|
| 1. | "Atlantis" | Mixd Up Kidz | 3:27 |
| 2. | "Barabajagal" | Apollo Cobra | 4:01 |
| 3. | "Epistle to Dippy" | Maudlin | 4:17 |
| 4. | "Sunshine Superman" | Colony House | 3:54 |
| 5. | "To Susan on the West Coast, Waiting" | Hamilton Leithauser | 4:32 |
| 6. | "Superlungs, My Supergirl" | Jillian Rae | 4:11 |
| 7. | "Catch the Wind" | Ivan & Alyosha | 2:38 |
| 8. | "Teen Angel" | Sharon Van Etten | 2:35 |
| 9. | "Colours" | Brett Dennen | 3:37 |
| 10. | "Happiness Runs" | Lissie | 3:39 |
| 11. | "There Is a Mountain" | Little Man | 2:50 |
| 12. | "Season of the Witch" | Astronautalis | 4:24 |
| 13. | "Laléna" | Savannah Smith | 3:55 |
| 14. | "Mellow Yellow" | Verskotzi | 4:03 |
| 15. | "Atlantis" | The Flaming Lips | 4:33 |
| Total length: | | | 56:46 |
