= Peace and Love Songs =

Compilation album by Donovan
- Released: 1 March 1996
- Recorded: 1966–1969
- Genre: rock
- Label: Sony Special Products
- Producer: Mickie Most

Donovan chronology
Golden Hits (1996)	Peace and Love Songs (1996)	Sutras (1996)

Professional ratings
Review scores
Source	Rating
Allmusic	2.5/5 stars

Peace and Love Songs is a compilation album from Scottish singer-songwriter Donovan. The album was released in the United States on 1 March 1996 (Sony Special Products 26474). The album was reissued in 2003 (Collectables 9342).

== History ==
In 1996, Sony Special Products issued Peace and Love Songs, a budget compilation of Donovan's Epic Records recordings dating from 1966 to 1969. Sony Special Products selected some songs that are not as well known as Donovan's singles, including several album tracks.

== Track listing ==
All tracks by Donovan Leitch

1. "Sunshine Superman" – 4:33
2. "There Is a Mountain" – 2:35
3. "Bert's Blues" – 4:00
4. "Jennifer Juniper" – 2:42
5. "The Sun Is a Very Magic Fellow" – 2:44
6. "Superlungs My Supergirl" – 2:40
7. "The Trip" – 4:35
8. "Atlantis" – 5:01
9. "Wear Your Love Like Heaven" – 2:25
10. "Laleña" – 2:54
