= Sunshine Superman =

Sunshine Superman may refer to:

- Works by the Scottish singer-songwriter Donovan, or the artist himself
  - "Sunshine Superman (song)", a 1966 song by Donovan
  - Sunshine Superman (album), a 1966 album by Donovan that features the 1966 song as its title track
  - Sunshine Superman, a 1967 UK album release (Pye Records NPL 18181) of Donovan songs from the other Sunshine Superman album and his 1967 album Mellow Yellow
  - Sunshine Superman: 18 Songs of Love and Freedom, a compilation of Donovan songs, 1993
  - Lady of the Stars, a 1984 Donovan album, reissued twice as Sunshine Superman, in 1994 and 1997
  - Sunshine Superman: The Very Best of Donovan, a compilation of Donovan songs, 2002
  - Other similarly named works in the Donovan discography, such as Sunshine Superman / In Concert At The Anaheim Convention Center of 1975 and The Best of Donovan Sunshine Superman of 2006
- Other
  - Sunshine Superman (film), a 2014 documentary film about BASE jumper Carl Boenish
