= Island of Circles =

Compilation album by Various artists
- Released: June 26, 1992
- Recorded: 1992
- Genre: Rock
- Length: 62:53
- Label: Nettwerk
- Producer: Denis Bov, Change of Heart, Count Mink, Sir Elmo, Lou Giordano, Orman Joban, Kevin Kane, Kramer, John Leckie, Ken "Hi-Watt" Marshall, The Posies, Greg Reely, Rudy Tambala, Conrad Uno, Steven Wilson, Windwalker, The Young Fresh Fellows

Donovan chronology
Colours (1991)	Island of Circles (1992)	Troubadour: The Definitive Collection 1964-1976 (1992)

Professional ratings
Review scores
Source	Rating
AllMusic	link link2

Island of Circles is a tribute album to singer-songwriter Donovan that was released on June 26, 1992, by Nettwerk. The title song "Island of Circles" is provided by Donovan himself. Along with Donovan's contemporaneous box set collection Troubadour: The Definitive Collection 1964–1976, the album contributed to a resurgence of interest in Donovan's music in the early 1990s, after he had been deemed unfashionable and out of step with changing musical tastes in the 1970s.

Sarah McLachlan's version of "Wear Your Love Like Heaven" was also included as a bonus track on some, but not all, editions of her 1991 album Solace. Spirit of the West's rendition of "Sunshine Superman" was reissued on their 2008 career retrospective Spirituality 1983–2008: The Consummate Compendium.

A slightly remixed version of No-Man's cover version of "Turquoise" later became the basis for an original song by the group called "Ocean Song," which was released later that same year as a single by the One Little Indian Records label.

The song "Island of Circles" was recorded again for the 2004 Donovan album Brother Sun, Sister Moon.

== Track listing ==
1. "Island of Circles" – Donovan
2. "Hurdy Gurdy Man" – Brix E. Smith and Nigel Kennedy – 5:50
3. "Epistle to Dippy" – Hypnolovewheel – 3:57
4. "Sunshine Superman" – Spirit of the West – 3:43
5. "The Fat Angel" – Windwalker – 7:51
6. "Mad John's Escape" – Young Fresh Fellows – 2:12
7. "Laléna" – Papa Sprain and Butterfly Child – 5:30
8. "Wear Your Love Like Heaven" – Sarah McLachlan – 3:21
9. "Armageddon" – Julian Jones – 3:25
10. "The River Song" – Posies – 3:22
11. "Changes" – Black Sox – 3:13
12. "Turquoise" – No-Man – 5:58
13. "Colours" – Superconductor – 3:03
14. "Barabajagal" – Chocolate Factory – 4:39
15. "Black Widow" – Change of Heart – 4:27
16. "The Natural High is the Best High in the World (Riki Tiki Tavi)" – When People Were Shorter and Lived Near the Water – 2:22
