= Catch the Wind (disambiguation) =

Catch the Wind is a 1965 Donovan song.

Catch the Wind may also refer to:

- What's Bin Did and What's Bin Hid, the 1965 album by Donovan re-titled Catch the Wind in the USA
- Catch the Wind (1971 album), a Donovan compilation album
- Catch the Wind (1986 album), a Donovan compilation album
- Catch the Wind (2000 album), a Donovan compilation album
- Catch the Wind (2003 album), a Donovan compilation album
- Catch the Wind: Songs of a Generation, a 2008 album released by Australian Idol 2006 winner Damien Leith
- Catch the Wind (2017 film), a French film
- Catch the Wind (1978 film), a Soviet drama film
