= Donovan's Greatest Hits =

Greatest hits album by Donovan
- Released: January 1969
- Recorded: December 1965 – September 1968
- Genres: Rock, folk-rock, psychedelic pop
- Length: 39:07
- Label: Epic
- Producers: Mickie Most (original issue) except for on expanded CD reissue: "Catch the Wind" prod. by Terry Kennedy, Peter Eden and Geoff Stephens and "Riki Tiki Tavi" prod. by Donovan Leitch; Expanded CD reissue prod. Al Quaglieri

Donovan chronology
This Is Donovan (1969)	Donovan's Greatest Hits (1969)	Barabajagal (1969)

Professional ratings
Review scores
Source	Rating
Allmusic	5/5 stars

Donovan's Greatest Hits is the first greatest hits album from Scottish singer-songwriter Donovan. It was released in the United States in January 1969 on Epic Records and in the United Kingdom in March 1969 on Pye Records. Donovan's Greatest Hits peaked at No. 4 on the Billboard 200, and has been certified platinum by the RIAA. In Canada the album reached No. 2.

== Background ==
Donovan's Greatest Hits is a distinct entry in Donovan's discography for several reasons. First, it collects three singles that were previously unreleased on any album: "Epistle to Dippy"; "There Is a Mountain"; and "Laléna." It also presents the unedited "Sunshine Superman" (one minute and fifteen seconds longer than the original 1966 single and LP release), and most of the songs appear for the first time in stereo. Lastly, Donovan's Greatest Hits contains re-recordings of "Catch the Wind" and "Colours" with Big Jim Sullivan playing guitar, John Paul Jones on bass and keyboards and Clem Cattini on drums. Epic Records could not obtain the right to release the original recordings of these two songs, so Donovan recorded new versions in May 1968 with a full backing band and a lavish production by Mickie Most.

== Artwork ==
The original vinyl LP contains a "photo booklet" depicting Donovan at various ages, starting with him as a toddler. The photo credits are given.

== Release ==
It was released in the US and Canada on Epic, catalogue BXN 26439 in stereo, and in the United Kingdom in March 1969 on Pye Records, catalogue NPL 18283 in mono and NSPL 18283 in stereo. Donovan's Greatest Hits marked the high point of Donovan's popularity in both the United States and United Kingdom. It also most likely had the effect of keeping many of Donovan's recordings on the shelf to avoid oversaturating the market. Nearly all of Donovan's next studio album was already recorded by the time of this release but remained unreleased until August 1969.

The album was included in critic Robert Christgau's "Basic Record Library" of 1950s and 1960s recordings, published in Christgau's Record Guide: Rock Albums of the Seventies (1981). AllMusic stated that "as these songs prove, Donovan and producer Mickie Most could craft irresistible folk-rock and psychedelic pop singles. Some of the sounds and sentiments may sound a little dated, but the productions and the songs have proven to be classics of the era, and this is the best place to get them all on one collection."

=== Reissues ===
In 1987, the original album was issued on compact disc by Epic Records in North America (EK 26439) and Epic/Sony Records in Japan (28·8P-1033). On 30 March 1999, Epic Legacy reissued a remastered version of the album (EK 65730), with the two sides of the original LP reversed which substitutes the original versions of "Catch the Wind" and "Colours" in place of the 1968 remakes and adds four bonus tracks which became hits after the album was first released.

== Track listing ==
All tracks by Donovan Leitch. On NSPL 18283, "Season of the Witch" is the first track on side two.

=== 1969 LP Version (Cat No. BXN 26439) ===
==== Side One ====
1. "Epistle to Dippy" – 3:08
2. "Sunshine Superman" (long version) – 4:32
3. "There Is a Mountain" – 2:33
4. "Jennifer Juniper" – 2:40
5. "Wear Your Love Like Heaven" – 2:23
6. "Season of the Witch" – 4:54

==== Side Two ====
1. "Mellow Yellow" – 3:37
2. "Colours" (1968 version) – 4:10
3. "Hurdy Gurdy Man" – 3:15
4. "Catch the Wind" (1968 version) – 5:01
5. "Laléna" – 2:54

=== 1999 remastered CD version ===
1. "Mellow Yellow" – 3:40
2. "Colours" (original version) – 2:44
3. "Hurdy Gurdy Man" – 3:19
4. "Catch the Wind" (original version) – 2:55
5. "Laléna" – 2:55
6. "Epistle to Dippy" – 3:10
7. "Sunshine Superman" (long version) – 4:31
8. "There Is a Mountain" – 2:34
9. "Jennifer Juniper" – 2:42
10. "Wear Your Love Like Heaven" – 2:24
11. "Season of the Witch" – 4:55

==== Bonus tracks ====
1. "Atlantis" – 4:59
2. "To Susan on the West Coast Waiting" – 3:11
3. "Barabajagal (Love Is Hot)" – 3:19
4. "Riki Tiki Tavi" – 2:56

== Charts ==
Chart (1969)	Peak position
US Billboard Top LPs	4
US Cashbox Top 100 Albums	4
CAN RPM Top 100 Albums	2

== Certifications ==
Region	Certification	Certified units/sales
Canada (Music Canada)	Gold	50,000^{^}
United States (RIAA)	Platinum	1,000,000^{^}
^{^} Shipments figures based on certification alone.
