= Atlantis Calling =

Compilation album by Donovan
- Released: 1999
- Recorded: 1971–1984
- Genre: folk, rock
- Label: Rockartoons
- Producer: Donovan Leitch

Donovan chronology
| Rising (as Cosmic Wheels) (1998) | Atlantis Calling (1999) | Forever Gold (2000) |

Professional ratings
Review scores
| Source | Rating |
|---|---|
| Allmusic | 3/5 stars |

Atlantis Calling is a compilation album from Scottish singer-songwriter Donovan. It was released in 1999 (Rockartoon 5212).

== History ==
In 1999, Rockartoons released a compilation of Donovan's 1984 Lady of the Stars album and his 1990 live album Rising. The liner notes erroneously claim the concert is Donovan's 1973 live album Live in Japan: Spring Tour 1973.

== Track listing ==
All tracks by Donovan Leitch, except where noted.

1. "Lady Of The Stars"
2. "I Love You Baby"
3. "Bye Bye Girl"
4. "Every Reason"
5. "Season of the Witch"
6. "For Every Boy There Is a Girl"
7. "Local Boy Chops Wood"
8. "Sunshine Superman"
9. "Living For The Love Light In Your Eyes"
10. "Till I See You Again"
11. "Universal Soldier" (Buffy Sainte-Marie)
12. "Colours"
13. "Jennifer Juniper"
14. "Catch the Wind"
15. "Hurdy Gurdy Man"
16. "Sadness"
17. "Cosmic Wheels"
18. "Atlantis"
19. "Wear Your Love Like Heaven"
20. "To Susan on the West Coast Waiting"
21. "Young Girl Blues"
