= Catch the Wind (1986 album) =

Compilation album by Donovan
- Released: April 1986
- Recorded: 1965
- Genre: folk
- Label: Showcase Records
- Producer: Terry Kennedy, Peter Eden, Geoff Stephens

Donovan chronology
Lady of the Stars (1984)	Catch the Wind (1986)	Colours (1987)

Catch the Wind is a compilation album from Scottish singer-songwriter Donovan. It was released in the United Kingdom (Showcase Records SHLP 133) in April 1986 and did not chart. This 1986 release bears little resemblance to the 1965 version of Catch the Wind released in the United States or to Catch the Wind from 1971.

== History ==
By 1986, Showcase Records had gained the rights to Donovan's 1965 Pye Records recordings. Showcase titled their release of some of the tracks Catch the Wind and released it in the United Kingdom.

== Track listing ==
All tracks by Donovan Leitch, except where noted.

=== Side one ===
1. "Universal Soldier" (Buffy Sainte-Marie)
2. "Little Tin Soldier" (Shawn Phillips)
3. "Catch the Wind"
4. "Josie"
5. "Colours"

=== Side two ===
1. "The Ballad of a Crystal Man"
2. "Keep on Truckin'" (traditional; arranged by Donovan Leitch)
3. "Circus of Sour" (Paul Bernath)
4. "Ballad of Geraldine"
5. "The War Drags On" (Mick Softley)
6. "Remember the Alamo" (Jane Bowers)
