= The Collection (Donovan album) =

Compilation album by Donovan
- Released: December 1990
- Recorded: 1965–1973
- Genre: folk, rock
- Label: Castle Communications
- Producer: Terry Kennedy, Peter Eden, Geoff Stephens, Mickie Most, Donovan

Donovan chronology
| 25 Years in Concert (1990) | The Collection (1990) | Colours (1991) |

Professional ratings
Review scores
| Source | Rating |
|---|---|
| Allmusic | 4/5 stars |

The Collection is a compilation album from Scottish singer-songwriter Donovan. It was released in the United Kingdom (Castle Communications CCSCD 276) in December 1990 and in the United States on 1 July 1992.

== History ==
In 1990, Castle Communications released a Donovan compilation that spanned both his 1965 Pye Records recordings and his subsequent work for Epic Records. The album marked the first appearance of many of the tracks on compact disc.

== Track listing ==
All tracks by Donovan Leitch.

1. "Catch the Wind" – 2:54
2. "Colours" – 2:43
3. "To Try for the Sun" – 3:36
4. "The Summer Day Reflection Song" – 2:11
5. "Turquoise" – 3:28
6. "The Trip" – 4:33
7. "Sunshine Superman" – 3:13
8. "Ferris Wheel" – 4:12
9. "Hey Gyp (Dig the Slowness)" – 3:09
10. "Museum" – 2:53
11. "Sunny South Kensington" – 3:48
12. "Hurdy Gurdy Man" – 3:12
13. "The Fat Angel" – 3:17
14. "Hi It's Been a Long Time" – 2:35
15. "Where Is She" – 2:44
16. "Changes" – 2:54
17. "Appearances" – 3:40
18. "Cosmic Wheels" – 4:01
19. "Lord of the Reedy River" – 2:34
20. "I Like You" – 5:16
21. "Song for John" – 2:18
22. "There Is an Ocean" – 4:48
