= Colours (1972 Donovan album) =

Compilation album by Donovan
- Released: June 1972
- Recorded: 1965
- Genre: folk
- Label: Hallmark
- Producer: Terry Kennedy, Peter Eden, Geoff Stephens

Donovan chronology
The World of Donovan (1972)	Colours (1972)	Early Treasures (1973)

Professional ratings
Review scores
Source	Rating
Allmusic	2/5 stars

Colours is a compilation album from Scottish singer-songwriter Donovan. It was released in the United Kingdom (Hallmark Records HMA 241) in June 1972 and did not chart.

== History ==
In 1971, Donovan's 1965 Pye Records recordings were sold to Hallmark Records. Although Pye subsidiary Golden Hour Records released Golden Hour of Donovan the year before, Hallmark assembled two albums from the recordings. The first album, titled Catch the Wind, was named after Donovan's first single but bore little resemblance to the U.S. album of the same name. The second album, titled Colours after Donovan's second single, marked the first time the song title was used for an album title.

== Track listing ==
All tracks by Donovan Leitch, except where noted.

=== Side one ===
1. "Colours"
2. "To Sing for You"
3. "Car Car" (Woody Guthrie)
4. "Ballad of Geraldine"
5. "Keep on Truckin'" (traditional, arranged by Donovan Leitch)

=== Side two ===
1. "Josie"
2. "Donna Donna" (Aaron Zeitlin, Sholom Secunda, Arthur S Kevess, Teddi Schwartz)
3. "The War Drags On" (Mick Softley)
4. "Hey Gyp (Dig the Slowness)"
5. "Tangerine Puppet"

== Personnel ==
- Donovan – guitar, harmonica, vocals
