= Jenny Boyd =

English model (born 1947)

- Born: Helen Mary Boyd; 8 November 1947 (age 78); Guildford, Surrey, England
- Occupations: Former model; rock muse; author; clinical manager
- Years active: 1962–present
- Spouses: Mick Fleetwood (m. 1970; div. 1976) (m. 1977; div. 1978) Ian Wallace (m. 1984, divorced) David Levitt (m. 1997)

Helen Mary "Jenny" Boyd (born 8 November 1947) is an English former model, the younger sister of 1960s model and photographer Pattie Boyd. She quit her modelling career in the 1960s after discovering Transcendental Meditation, stating that modelling was "a waste of her time". She later managed an addiction treatment centre and wrote two books.

== Early life and career ==
Helen Mary Boyd was born in Guildford, Surrey, England in November 1947 to Diana Frances Boyd (née Drysdale) and Colin "Jock" Ian Langdon Boyd, a pilot.

She was a freelance model in the 1960s, and often accompanied her sister Pattie to modelling jobs. Through Pattie's relationship with George Harrison, she came to know the Beatles, various bands that included Eric Clapton, and other major British rock acts. As a rock star muse, Boyd inspired Donovan ("Jennifer Juniper") and Mick Fleetwood to write songs about her.

From December 1967, she worked at the Beatles' short-lived retail venture, Apple Boutique, in London. Early the following year, she accompanied Pattie and Harrison on the band's visit to Rishikesh in India, where they studied Transcendental Meditation with Maharishi Mahesh Yogi. In July 1968, she and Pattie opened a boutique in London's fashionable Chelsea Market; they named it "Jennifer Juniper" after Donovan's song of the same name. Boyd managed the shop, which sold antiques and other objets d'art, while Pattie was the buyer.

She wrote, or co-wrote, two songs for the band Fleetwood Mac, although the group's manager gave the writing credits to her husband, Mick Fleetwood. Following Pattie's return to modelling in the early 1970s, Boyd, Pattie and their youngest sister Paula were the subject of a British Vogue shoot by photographer Patrick Lichfield.

Boyd attended UCLA in the late 1980s, earned a PhD in psychology, and became manager of an addiction treatment clinic. She co-authored a book about music and psychology, titled Musicians in Tune. She spent many years running an addiction treatment centre in England. In 2020, she published her autobiography, titled Jennifer Juniper.

== Personal life ==
Despite Boyd being the inspiration of Donovan's song "Jennifer Juniper", they were never in a relationship, although Donovan admitted to having a crush on her. "Jennifer Juniper" was released as a single in March 1968 and on the album The Hurdy Gurdy Man later that year. Boyd shared an apartment with Magic Alex of Apple Corps's Apple Electronics subdivision.

Boyd was 15 when she met a similarly young Mick Fleetwood, who attended her school. At the time, Fleetwood was the drummer in the Bo Street Runners; he later co-founded Fleetwood Mac. They began an on-and-off relationship that would last 15 years. They married in June 1970 and had two daughters. After divorcing Fleetwood (and remarrying and divorcing him a second time), Boyd married drummer Ian Wallace in 1984 but they later divorced. In 1997 Boyd married the architect David Levitt.
