= The Early Years (Donovan album) =

Compilation album by Donovan
- Released: March 1993
- Recorded: 1965
- Genre: folk
- Label: Dojo
- Producer: Terry Kennedy, Peter Eden, Geoff Stephens

Donovan chronology
One Night in Time (1993)	The Early Years (1993)	Sunshine Superman: 18 Songs of Love and Freedom (1993)

Professional ratings
Review scores
Source	Rating
Allmusic	3/5 stars

The Early Years is a compilation album from Scottish singer-songwriter Donovan. It was released in the United Kingdom in March 1993 (Dojo EarlD 13) and the United States in October 1994.

== History ==
In 1993, Dojo Records released another compilation of Donovan's 1965 Pye Records recordings entitled The Early Years. The compilation was released in the United States by Castle the following year.

== Track listing ==
All tracks by Donovan Leitch, except where noted.

1. "Catch the Wind" – 2:56
2. "Why Do You Treat Me Like You Do" – 2:57
3. "Cuttin' Out" – 2:19
4. "Gold Watch Blues" (Mick Softley) – 2:32
5. "Colours" – 2:45
6. "Do You Hear Me Now" (Bert Jansch) – 1:48
7. "Turquoise" – 3:30
8. "Hey Gyp (Dig the Slowness)" – 3:11
9. "Circus of Sour" (traditional; arranged by Donovan) – 1:51
10. "Sunny Goodge Street" – 2:56
11. "Josie" – 3:25
12. "The Little Tin Soldier" (Shawn Phillips) – 2:58
13. "Remember the Alamo" (Jane Bowers) – 3:04
14. "Ballad of a Crystal Man" – 3:50
