= Donovan File =

Compilation album by Donovan
- Released: November 1977
- Recorded: 1965
- Genre: Folk
- Label: Pye Records
- Producer: Terry Kennedy, Peter Eden, Geoff Stephens

Donovan chronology
Donovan (1977)	Donovan File (1977)	Star Discothek: Donovan (1978)

Donovan File is a compilation album from Scottish singer-songwriter Donovan. It was released in the United Kingdom (Pye FILD 004) in 1977.

== History ==
In 1977, Pye Records issued another set of Donovan's 1965 recordings in a double album titled Donovan File. The album was part of a "File" series encompassing many bands and artists who recorded for Pye in the 1960s. The album featured nearly all of Donovan's 1965 recordings, excluding the single versions of "Catch the Wind" and "Colours", the French EP track "Every Man Has His Chain", and the EP version of "Ballad of a Crystal Man".

== Track listing ==
All tracks by Donovan Leitch, except where noted.

1. "Catch the Wind"
2. "Why Do You Treat Me Like You Do?"
3. "Remember the Alamo" (Jane Bowers)
4. "Cuttin' Out"
5. "Car Car" (Woody Guthrie)
6. "Keep on Truckin'" (traditional; arranged by Donovan Leitch)
7. "Gold Watch Blues" (Mick Softley)
8. "To Sing for You"
9. "Josie"
10. "You're Gonna Need Somebody on Your Bond" (traditional; arranged by Donovan Leitch)
11. "Tangerine Puppet"
12. "Donna Donna" (Aaron Zeitlin, Sholom Secunda, Arthur S Kevess, Teddi Schwartz)
13. "Ramblin' Boy"
14. "Sunny Goodge Street"
15. "Oh Deed I Do" (Bert Jansch)
16. "Colours"
17. "To Try for the Sun"
18. "Circus of Sour"
19. "Summer Day Reflection Song"
20. "Candy Man" (traditional; arranged by Donovan Leitch)
21. "Jersey Thursday"
22. "Belated Forgiveness Plea"
23. "Universal Soldier" (Buffy Sainte-Marie)
24. "Ballad of a Crystal Man"
25. "Little Tin Soldier" (Shawn Phillips)
26. "Ballad of Geraldine"
27. "The War Drags On" (Mick Softley)
28. "Do You Hear Me Now?" (Bert Jansch)
29. "Hey Gyp (Dig the Slowness)"
30. "Turquoise"

== Personnel ==
- Donovan – guitar, harmonica, vocals
