= Catch the Wind (1978 film) =

1978 film directed by Vladimir Lyubomudrov

- Russian: Ищи ветра…
- Directed by: Vladimir Lyubomudrov
- Written by: Vladimir Lyubomudrov
- Starring: Konstantin Grígoryev; Pavel Kadochnikov; Elena Proklova; Lev Prygunov; Aleksandr Porokhovshchikov
- Cinematography: Vladimir Bondarev; Rudolf Zuyev
- Edited by: T. Protopopova
- Music by: Eduard Artemyev
- Release date: 1978
- Running time: 76 minute
- Country: Soviet Union
- Language: Russian

Catch the Wind (Russian: Ищи ветра…) is a 1978 Soviet adventure drama film directed by Vladimir Lyubomudrov.

== Plot ==
The manager of the stud farm with his daughter and her fiance are trying to avoid a civil war in the Ural steppes, but the war still comes to them.

== Cast ==
- Konstantin Grígoryev as Pavel (as Konstantin Grigorev)
- Pavel Kadochnikov as Sergey Sergeyevich
- Elena Proklova as Natasha
- Lev Prygunov as Viktor
- Aleksandr Porokhovshchikov as Captain
- Mikhail Kononov as Vaska
- Sergey Bachurskiy as Gavrya (as S. Bachurskiy)
- Aleksandr Yanvaryov as Uryadnik (as A. Yanyaryov)
- Nikolay Pogodin as Timofeyev (as N. Pogodin)
- Vitali Titov as Obechkin (as V. Titov)
