= Lady of the Stars =

Studio album by Donovan
- Released: January 1984 (in the US)
- Recorded: 1983
- Studio: Cherokee (Hollywood)
- Genre: Folk
- Length: 38:39
- Label: RCA (UK); Allegiance Records (US)
- Producer: Bruce Robb, Dee Robb, Jerry Wexler

Donovan chronology
Love Is Only Feeling (1981)	Lady of the Stars (1984)	Rising (1990)

Reissue
- Till I See You Again

Reissue
- Sunshine Superman (1994)

Professional ratings
Review scores
Source	Rating
AllMusic	2/5 stars
AllMusic	2/5 stars
AllMusic	2/5 stars

Lady of the Stars is the seventeenth studio album, and nineteenth album overall, by the Scottish singer-songwriter Donovan. It was released in the UK (RCA PL 70060) in 1983 and the US (Allegiance Records AV 437) in January 1984.

== History ==
By 1983, Donovan's albums were receiving little distribution in the UK and none in the US. His popularity had steadily decreased through the 1970s and early 1980s and mainstream record companies were not convinced that Donovan's albums could generate enough record sales to warrant release. Donovan decided that to win over the record companies and reach his American and British fans, he would record new versions of both "Sunshine Superman" and "Season of the Witch" for inclusion on his next album. Both songs were released on the Sunshine Superman album in 1966 and Donovan's Greatest Hits in 1969. The name recognition of these two songs would give the record companies marketing leverage and guarantee release.

In addition to "Sunshine Superman" and "Season of the Witch", Donovan updated three other songs from his canon. Two of these songs, "Lady of the Stars" (written for Donovan's wife Linda Lawrence) and "Local Boy Chops Wood" (written about Brian Jones) were as well recorded and released on Donovan in 1977, "Boy for Every Girl" had been recorded for his 1973 album Essence to Essence. Donovan also included five new songs and titled the album Lady of the Stars for his wife Linda.

Lady of the Stars was released in Britain through RCA, and licensed in the US to Allegiance Records. It became the first Donovan album to receive a US release since Donovan in 1977.

After this, Donovan took an extended hiatus from recording, and would not release another studio album until Sutras twelve years later.

== Personnel ==
Session musicians and guest appearances on this album include:

- Guitar: Pete Carr, Richie Zito
- Keyboards: Barry Beckett, Bill Payne, William "Smitty" Smith, Jai Winding, Bruce Robb
- Bass guitar: Bob Glaub, Leland Sklar, Wilton Felder, Jim Strauss
- Drums: Rayford Griffin, James Gadson, Mike "Reedo" Reed, Paulinho da Costa (percussion)
- Wind instruments: Jim Horn
- Guests: Graham Nash and Bonnie Bramlett (backing vocals), Dave Mason (guitar), John Sebastian (autoharp)

The album was recorded at Cherokee Studios, Los Angeles, produced by Jerry Wexler with Dee and Bruce Robb, whilst tracks "Sunshine Superman" and "Season of the Witch" were produced by Dee and Bruce Robb

== Track listing ==
All tracks by Donovan Leitch.

Side one

1. "Lady of the Stars" – 4:37
2. "I Love You Baby" – 3:28
3. "Bye, Bye Girl" – 3:22
4. "Every Reason" – 3:05
5. "Season of the Witch" – 5:27

Side two

1. "Boy for Every Girl" – 4:39
2. "Local Boy Chops Wood" – 3:29
3. "Sunshine Superman" – 4:06
4. "Living for the Love Light" – 3:44
5. "Till I See You Again" – 3:14

== Reissues ==
Lady of the Stars has been the focus of many CD reissues since its original release. The reissues sometimes have a different track order, and the album has rarely gone under its original title. Some are designed to look like greatest hits albums (Golden Hits) or like a reissue of the 1966 studio album Sunshine Superman.

- Till I See You Again, released in July 1994 (Success 22534CD).
- Sunshine Superman, released November 29, 1994 (Charly Records CDCD 1206). Shuffled track order. The album cover is from the same photo session as Donovan's 1967 album Wear Your Love Like Heaven.
- Golden Hits, (original track order) released February 23, 1996 (Masters Music MACD 61075–2, Holland/Intercontinental Records 1075, US).
- Sunshine Superman, released June 3, 1997, (Remember Records). Same track order as Charly Records release.
- Forever Gold, rel. January 18, 2000, St. Clair Records, St. Clair 5818
- Golden Tracks, August 22, 2000 (Cleopatra 852)

Other

- Wonderful Music of Donovan (compilation that contains tracks from Lady of the Stars) (1993)
