= Catch the Wind (1971 album) =

Compilation album by Donovan
- Released: 1971
- Recorded: 1965
- Genre: folk
- Label: Hallmark
- Producers: Terry Kennedy, Peter Eden, Geoff Stephens

Donovan chronology
| Donovan P. Leitch (1970) | Catch the Wind (1971) | Hear Me Now (1971) |

Catch the Wind is a compilation album from Scottish singer-songwriter Donovan. It was released in the United Kingdom (Hallmark Records HMA 200) in 1971 and did not chart. This 1971 release bears little resemblance to the 1965 version of What's Bin Did and What's Bin Hid released as Catch the Wind in the United States.

== History ==
In 1971, Hallmark Records gained the rights to Donovan's 1965 Pye Records recordings. Hallmark titled the first compilation Catch the Wind and released it in 1971. Even with a compilation already on the market, Pye subsidiary Golden Hour Records released a compilation of the same recordings as Golden Hour of Donovan in the United Kingdom within the same year. The following year, Hallmark assembled a second compilation titled Colours.

It should be noticed that the Album Cover was printed wrongly as Donovan is right handed and not left handed as shown in the cover photo

== Track listing ==
All tracks by Donovan Leitch, except where noted.

=== Side one ===
1. "Catch the Wind"
2. "Candy Man" (traditional, arranged by Donovan Leitch)
3. "Remember the Alamo" (Jane Bowers)
4. "Sunny Goodge Street"
5. "Ramblin' Boy" (Courtney Hatcher)

=== Side two ===
1. "Universal Soldier" (Buffy Sainte-Marie)
2. "Little Tin Soldier" (Shawn Phillips)
3. "Turquoise"
4. "Gold Watch Blues" (Mick Softley)
5. "The Ballad of a Crystal Man"
