= Mellow Yellow (album) =

Studio album by Donovan
- Released: 10 February 1967
- Recorded: December 1965, January, August, November 1966
- Studio: Abbey Road Studio, London; Landsowne Studios, London
- Genre: Pop; folk; baroque folk; jazz; psychedelic pop
- Length: 34:13
- Label: Epic LN 24239
- Producer: Mickie Most

Donovan chronology
Sunshine Superman (1966)	Mellow Yellow (1967)	A Gift from a Flower to a Garden (1967)

Singles from Mellow Yellow
- 1. "Mellow Yellow" b/w "Sunny South Kensington" Released: October 1966 (US); 2. "Mellow Yellow" b/w "Preachin' Love" Released: February 1967 (UK)

Mellow Yellow is the fourth studio album by Scottish singer-songwriter Donovan. It was released in the US in February 1967 (Epic Records LN 24239 (monaural) / BN 26239 (rechanneled stereo), but not released in the UK because of a continuing contractual dispute that also prevented Sunshine Superman from a UK release. In June 1967, a cross-section of both albums was released as Sunshine Superman (Pye Records NPL 18181) in the UK. "Mellow Yellow" was the name of Donovan's hit single released in America the previous October.

== Background ==
As Donovan prepared to enter the studio to record the bulk of his fourth album in November 1966, he was reeling from several events which had recently derailed his career. First, a contractual dispute with his previous label Pye Records resulted in a delayed release for his new single "Sunshine Superman". Originally planned for a 28 January 1966 release, it would not arrive in shops until 1 July in America and 2 December in England, the latter nearly a full year after its recording. The Sunshine Superman album was also delayed; for a while it seemed like his new music would never come out, and he wondered whether it would be outdated when it did. Meanwhile, in June, a drug bust for marijuana landed him in the tabloids. To escape the pressure, he traveled to the Greek island of Paros, where his dour mood contributed to the melancholy feel of "Writer In The Sun", one of the new songs he penned there.

Despite these setbacks, the "Sunshine Superman" single topped the US charts that September, with the album named after it also nearing the Billboard top 10. This success necessitated Donovan's return to England to record a follow up, even though he still wasn't sure whether his new music would see release in his home country, as the UK date for "Sunshine Superman" kept getting pushed back month after month.

== Songs and recording ==
The songs on Mellow Yellow represent a transition in Donovan's writing. Donovan's songs had previously illustrated his ability to define the mid-sixties pop music scene. On Mellow Yellow this is still evident in "Sunny South Kensington", "Museum" (originally recorded for the Sunshine Superman album and rerecorded for Mellow Yellow) and the title track, but is also tempered with world-weary observations of that scene ("Young Girl Blues"). The contractual problems that prevented the release of Donovan's music in the UK led him to write such songs as the resigned "Writer in the Sun", where he contemplates the possibility of his own forced retirement from the music industry at the age of 20.

Mickie Most's production, along with the arrangements of John Cameron and John Paul Jones accommodate these two divergent traits of Donovan's songwriting throughout Mellow Yellow. According to Most, Donovan would play him a new batch of songs from which Most would choose the ones to record, whereupon the two would sit with Cameron and devise their arrangements. Due to this well-oiled process the recording sessions were usually brief, with an average of one song per hour recorded and an album finished within a week or two. The peppier songs feature a diverse selection of instruments similar to Sunshine Superman and helped make a top 10 hit out of the title track on both sides of the Atlantic. Despite the similarity in Cameron's elaborate arrangements between the two albums, which often featured strings, harpsichord and flute, one notable difference is the absence of the Indian influence on Mellow Yellow, with only "Sunny South Kensington" featuring a brief sitar part. In its place is a notable jazz flavor both in the rhythms (particularly Danny Thompson's double bass work) and the use of a horn section on the title track, "The Observation", and "House Of Jansch". Meanwhile, introspective ruminations like "Young Girl Blues" and "Sand and Foam" return to Donovan's early folk period, featuring sparse instrumentation that highlights his guitar playing, singing, and lyrics.

Several songs on Mellow Yellow were originally recorded during the sessions for the previous album. The earliest was "Sunny South Kensington", originally planned as the flip side to "Sunshine Superman" and recorded during the same December 1965 sessions; it would first see release in America in October 1966 as the B-side to "Mellow Yellow". "Young Girl Blues" was recorded in January 1966 and recounts his then-girlfriend Linda Lawrence's disillusionment as a model in Los Angeles. "Sand And Foam", also recorded earlier in 1966, uses vivid, hallucinogenic imagery to describe a trip he took that April to Puerto Vallarta in Mexico with his friend Gypsy Dave. According to the artist, both tracks were recorded in London using Most's Jumbo Gibson guitar. The title track was recorded in August 1966, just before the trip to Greece, and features Paul McCartney providing uncredited background vocals as he returned the favor of Donovan providing a line of lyric for "Yellow Submarine". The arrangement was handled by John Paul Jones, who suggested using "hats" or horn mutes to create the distinctive "mellow" horn sound.

After Donovan returned from Greece he recorded demos of his new songs that October, with recording sessions for the rest of the album taking place in November. A total of nine songs were logged as completed by 22 November, including the outtakes "Preachin' Love" (later released as the flip side to "Epistle to Dippy" in America), "Good Time" and a remake of "Superlungs", which was first recorded in April for Sunshine Superman but passed over once more until a 1968 recording found its way onto Barabajagal. Of the six remaining songs that made the album, "House of Jansch" described a love triangle between Donovan, British folk personage Bert Jansch, and female folk singer Beverley Kutner whom the two men had competed for affection a year prior; it marked the third Donovan album in a row that paid tribute to Jansch. "Hampstead Incident", which merged folk, classical, jazz, and psychedelia with an elaborate Cameron arrangement, was penned outside the Everyman cinema in Hampstead where Leitch stood contemplating the soft misty rain on mescalin. "Museum", another track originally recorded during the April Sunshine Superman sessions, had a West Caribbean influence that was remade in a poppier arrangement which Herman's Hermits would score a minor hit with in 1967. "Writer in the Sun", scored with chamber strings and flute, had stemmed from his sojourn in Greece while "The Observation" was a piece of jazzy social commentary featuring drummer Phil Seamen. When it was decided one more song was required, Donovan penned a blues about the "bleak city" of his current girlfriend Enid's hometown of New York, which was scored by Cameron with horns.

== Album cover art ==
The sleeve for the album was an illustration by Donovan's friends Mick Taylor and Sheena McCall, which depicts a seductive 20s flapper in a yellow dress smoking what the artist later mused could have been "pure Humboldt Indica marijuana" from a long holder; in the background are fantasy illustrations which depict some of the songs. On the back is a picture of the artist taken by David Redford at George Harrison's Esher bungalow in a white suit and polo neck, with another illustration of a very long-haired nude female enchantress next to him.

== Release and reception ==
Professional ratings
Review scores
Source	Rating
AllMusic	Original
AllMusic	Bonus tracks
Encyclopedia of Popular Music	4/5 stars

The album was released in America on 10 February 1967 and like the single was a success, charting at number 14 that March. However, Donovan was frustrated that neither Sunshine Superman or Mellow Yellow had seen release in his home country; he would have to wait until June before a 12-track album titled Sunshine Superman (again featuring cover art by Taylor and McCall) which compiled tracks from both albums saw a long belated release, yet this meant British fans missed out on several key tracks from both albums unless they were able to secure imports.

Writing for AllMusic, Bruce Eder notes the album is more diverse in its sounds than Sunshine Superman and calls "Sand and Foam" "hauntingly beautiful", while identifying "Museum" as a sequel to "Sunshine Superman" and a precursor to "There Is a Mountain".

== Legacy ==
According to a recent biography ("Darker Than The Deepest Sea: The Search For Nick Drake"), the album was a significant influence on Nick Drake.

The track "Hampstead Incident" was first recorded by Marianne Faithfull as "In The Night Time" on her U.S. album Faithfull Forever released in August 1966, followed by "Young Girl Blues" on her March 1967 effort Love In A Mist. The 1967 Julie Felix album Flowers also contained covers of "Young Girl Blues" and "Sand and Foam", both given John Cameron arrangements although Donovan's originals only featured his voice and guitar.

The track "Museum" was covered by Herman's Hermits on their 1967 album release Blaze.

Odell Brown and the Organizers covered "Mellow Yellow" in 1967 on their album by the same title.

== Reissues ==
- On 24 October 1994, EMI released Four Donovan Originals (EMI 7243 8 30867 2 6) in the UK. Four Donovan Originals is a compact disc box set containing four Donovan albums that were not previously released in the UK. Mellow Yellow is disc two of that set.
- On 16 January 2001, Collectables Records released Mellow Yellow/Wear Your Love Like Heaven (Collectables 6644), which contained all of Mellow Yellow and the first record of A Gift from a Flower to a Garden, Wear Your Love Like Heaven.
- On 24 May 2005, EMI reissued Mellow Yellow (EMI 8735672) with ten bonus tracks.
- On 24 September 2010, Sony Music Entertainment reissued Mellow Yellow as part of a 3-CD set with The Hurdy Gurdy Man and Barabajagal
- On 1 October 2018, The state51 Conspiracy reissued Mellow Yellow (CON224LP) in the UK and Ireland on LP.

== Track listing ==
All tracks by Donovan Leitch. Songs marked with a '+' have been remixed into stereo.

=== Original album ===
Side one

1. "Mellow Yellow" – 3:47
2. "Writer in the Sun" – 4:33 +
3. "Sand and Foam" – 3:19
4. "The Observation" – 2:23
5. "Bleak City Woman" – 2:24

Side two

1. "House of Jansch" – 2:43
2. "Young Girl Blues" – 3:45
3. "Museum" – 2:54
4. "Hampstead Incident" – 4:41 +
5. "Sunny South Kensington" – 3:48 +

=== 2005 EMI CD version ===
The ten tracks as on the original release plus the following bonus tracks:

11. "Epistle to Dippy" – 3:11
12. "Preachin' Love" – 2:40
13. "Good Time" – 1:54
14. "There Is a Mountain" – 2:36 +
15. "Superlungs" (second version) – 3:17
16. "Epistle to Dippy" (alternative arrangement) – 3:13 +
17. "Sidewalk (The Observation)" (demo) – 2:29
18. "Writer in the Sun" (demo) – 3:30
19. "Hampstead Incident" (demo) – 3:52
20. "Museum" (demo) – 3:49

== Personnel ==
Musicians

- Donovan – acoustic guitar, vocals
- John Cameron – piano (tracks 4–5, 10, 12–13, 15), harpsichord (tracks 9, 10, 11, 16), organ (track 10) celesta (tracks 2, 6), arrangements (tracks 2, 4–6, 9, 11–16)
- John Paul Jones – bass guitar, arrangement (track 1)
- Danny Thompson, Spike Heatley – double bass
- Phil Seamen – drums
- Bobby Orr – drums (tracks 1, 10)
- John McLaughlin – rhythm guitar (track 1)
- Joe Moretti – rhythm guitar (track 1)
- Danny Moss – saxophone (track 1)
- Ronnie Ross – saxophone (track 1)
- Big Jim Sullivan – electric guitar (track 5)
- Eric Ford – electric guitar (track 10)
- Shawn Phillips – sitar (track 10)
- Pat Halling – violin (track 8)
- Harold McNair – flute (tracks 2, 4, 18)

Additional musicians

- Paul McCartney – occasional bass
- Jimmy Page – electric guitar (tracks 11, 16)
- Tony Carr – percussion, drums (tracks 11, 16)

Technical

- Mickie Most – producer

== Charts ==
=== Album ===
Year	Chart (1967)	Peak position	Label
1967	U.S. Billboard Top LP's	14	Epic Records BN 26239
1967	U.S. Cashbox Top 100 Albums	12	Epic Records BN 26239
1967	CAN RPM Top 30 Albums	4	Epic Records BN 26239

=== Singles ===
Year	Titles	Chart positions			
Year	Titles	Billboard	Cashbox	CAN	AU
1967	"Mellow Yellow" b/w "Sunny South Kensington" (US) b/w "Preachin' Love" (UK)	2	3	2	7
