= Barabajagal =

Studio album by Donovan
- Released: 11 August 1969
- Recorded: May, November 1968 and May 1969
- Studio: Olympic, London; American Recording Company, Los Angeles
- Genre: Folk rock, psychedelic folk
- Length: 33:43
- Label: Epic
- Producer: Mickie Most

Donovan chronology
The Hurdy Gurdy Man (1968)	Barabajagal (1969)	Open Road (1970)

Official audio"Barabajagal (Love Is Hot)" (2005 Remastered Version) on YouTube

Singles from Barabajagal
- 1. "Atlantis" b/w "I Love My Shirt" Released: November 1968 (UK); 2. "To Susan on the West Coast Waiting" b/w "Atlantis" Released: January 1969 (US); 3. "Barabajagal" b/w "Trudi" Released: June 1969 (UK), August 1969 (US)

Barabajagal is the seventh studio album and eighth album overall from British singer-songwriter Donovan. It was released by Epic Records in the United States on 11 August 1969, but was not released in the United Kingdom because of a continuing contractual dispute that also prevented Sunshine Superman, Mellow Yellow, and The Hurdy Gurdy Man from being released in the UK.

== Background ==
Donovan had released a series of successful singles and albums since 1965, making him one of the biggest pop stars of the era and a key symbol for the 60s "flower child" generation. He began sessions for the follow up to 1968's The Hurdy Gurdy Man directly after his second tour of North America in the fall of 1968. His original concept for the album was to be titled Moon in Capricorn, consisting of a series of gentle acoustic children's songs similar to the For Little Ones disc of A Gift from a Flower to a Garden. However, he was recording other more typical pop/rock material at the same time, and the children's folk album was eventually scrapped in favor of a pop album combined from different sessions throughout 1968 and 1969 in its stead. Most of the songs intended for Moon in Capricorn were eventually released on 1971's HMS Donovan and the 2005 box set Try for the Sun: The Journey of Donovan. It was also around this time that his relationship with producer Mickie Most began to show strain, with Donovan electing to produce some of the songs on the album himself or with other collaborators.

== Songs and recording ==
"Superlungs (My Supergirl)", "Where Is She" and "Happiness Runs" were recorded in May 1968 at Olympic Studios in London, while "I Love My Shirt", "The Love Song", "To Susan on the West Coast Waiting", "Atlantis" and "Pamela Jo" were recorded at American Recording Company in Los Angeles that November. The Los Angeles sessions were produced by Donovan and Gabriel Mekler, although the eventual album only credits Mickie Most. All of these songs except "Atlantis", "I Love My Shirt" and "To Susan on the West Coast Waiting" were shelved while Donovan's Greatest Hits was still high in the charts. "Atlantis" / "I Love My Shirt" was released as a single in November 1968 in the UK, where it charted at number 23. In the US, "To Susan on the West Coast Waiting" / "Atlantis" was released in January 1969. "To Susan on the West Coast Waiting" was an anti-Vietnam War number, the first protest song Donovan had written since his folkie period in 1965. It peaked at number 35 although "Atlantis" ended up charting higher, peaking at number 7 and eventually being recognized as the A-side.

In May 1969, Mickie Most produced at least one session with Donovan fronting the Jeff Beck Group. "Goo Goo Barabajagal (Love Is Hot)" (also known as "Barabajagal (Love Is Hot)" and simply "Barabajagal") and "Trudi" (originally "Bed with Me", based on the same melody as "Lay of the Last Tinker" from the For Little Ones disc) resulted from these sessions. "Barabajagal" featured Madeleine Bell and Lesley Duncan on backing vocals. "Stromberg Twins" and "Snakeskin" were also recorded by Donovan and the Jeff Beck Group, but they remained unreleased until they appeared as bonus tracks on the 2005 UK reissue of the album. Rod Stewart was in the band at this time, but he does not sing lead on any of the songs that were released. It is during these sessions that Donovan's musical vision and work ethic began to diverge from that of producer Most, and the two eventually stopped working together, effectively ending Donovan's chart success.

"Goo Goo Barabajagal (Love Is Hot)" / "Trudi" was released as a single in June 1969 in the UK and in August 1969 in the United States. Following the pattern of Donovan's previous releases, his next album was named after the hit single of the time. The inclusion of "Atlantis", the title track and "To Susan on the West Coast Waiting" helped make Barabajagal a strong seller in the United States, where it peaked at number 23.

"Happiness Runs" is a round sung by Donovan, Graham Nash, Michael McCartney, and Lesley Duncan and was originally released without the round as "Pebble and the Man" on 1968's Donovan in Concert. The singer noted that it had been a favorite song of the Maharishi when he played it for the guru during his stay at the Rishikesh ashram in February 1968. "Superlungs (My Supergirl)" was originally recorded during both the Sunshine Superman and Mellow Yellow sessions, but was not used for either album. The Sunshine Superman recording in an early acid-rock style was released on Troubadour: The Definitive Collection 1964–1976, while the jazzier Mellow Yellow outtake appeared as a bonus track on the 2005 CD reissue. Donovan re-recorded the song for Barabajagal, changing the lyrics to de-emphasize the song's original references to marijuana use. The silly, comedic "I Love My Shirt" had been performed with Tom and Dick Smothers during a November 1968 appearance on The Smothers Brothers Comedy Hour.

== Album cover art ==
The front cover of Barabajagal was designed by Donovan and Sydney Maurer using Victorian prints of children from the artist's own book collection. The back cover featured an infrared photo taken of Donovan by Maurer, similar to those included in the artwork to A Gift from a Flower to a Garden.

Professional ratings
Review scores
Source	Rating
AllMusic	4/5 stars
Robert Christgau	C+
The Encyclopedia of Popular Music	4/5 stars
The Rolling Stone Album Guide	3/5 stars

== Release and reception ==
Barabajagal was released in the US (Epic Records BN 26481) on August 11, 1969. It peaked at number 23, although it became Donovan's first album to miss the top 20 of the Billboard chart since Fairytale in 1965. The album reached number 22 in Canada and the title single reached number 20. A UK release was not forthcoming, as it was the artist's fourth album (after Sunshine Superman, Mellow Yellow and The Hurdy Gurdy Man) not to see release in that country, although a compilation of tracks from Sunshine Superman and Mellow Yellow had been released under the title Sunshine Superman in June 1967.

Reception to the album was mixed. Billboard predicted "he's sure to prove no surprise when he rides to the top of the LP chart", singling out "Where is She" and "I Love My Shirt" for praise. Conversely, Robert Christgau of The Village Voice sarcastically stated "praise him for putting the worst cuts on one side and recommend this to all the gentle people, while they die of the droops." Retrospectively, Bruce Eder of AllMusic gave four stars and enthused "With Barabajagal, Donovan intermingled soft, lyrical, spaced-out folk, hard psychedelia, children's songs, anthems to free love, and even antiwar sentiments ("To Susan on the West Coast Waiting"). The result was the most challenging album then issued by Donovan, but also one of his most successful."

== Reissues ==
- On 25 October 1990, Epic Records reissued Barabajagal (Epic 26481), in the US on CD.
- On 16 May 2005, EMI reissued Barabajagal (EMI 8735692), in the UK on CD, with thirteen bonus tracks.
- On 1 October 2018, The state51 Conspiracy reissued Barabajagal (CON236LP), in the UK and Ireland, on 180 gram vinyl.

== Track listing ==
All tracks are written by Donovan Leitch.

Side one
No.	Title	Length
1.	"Barabajagal"	3:20
2.	"Superlungs My Supergirl"	2:39
3.	"Where Is She"	2:46
4.	"Happiness Runs"	3:25
5.	"I Love My Shirt"	3:19

Side two
No.	Title	Length
1.	"The Love Song"	3:14
2.	"To Susan on the West Coast Waiting"	3:12
3.	"Atlantis"	4:58
4.	"Trudi"	2:23
5.	"Pamela Jo"	4:24

=== 2005 EMI CD bonus tracks ===
11. "Stromberg Twins" – 4:40
12. "Snakeskin" – 2:41
13. "Lauretta's Cousin Laurinda" – 4:18
14. "The Swan (Lord of the Reedy River)" – 3:08
15. "Poor Man's Sunshine (Nativity)" – 5:19
16. "New Year's Resolution (Donovan's Celtic Jam)" – 3:16
17. "Runaway" (demo) – 3:03
18. "Sweet Beverley" (demo) – 2:59
19. "Marjorie (Margarine)" (demo) – 3:17
20. "Little White Flower" (demo) – 2:09
21. "Good Morning Mr. Wind" (demo) – 2:08
22. "Palais Girl" (demo) – 2:26
23. "Lord of the Universe" (demo) – 3:12

== Personnel ==
Credits adapted from Troubadour (The Definitive Collection 1964–1976) CD box set liner notes, except where otherwise noted.

- Donovan – vocal, acoustic guitar

Additional musicians

- Jeff Beck – electric guitar (1)
- Ron Wood – bass guitar (1)
- Nicky Hopkins – keyboards (1)
- Tony Newman – drums (1)
- Suzi Quatro – background vocals (1)
- Madeline Bell – background vocals (1, 9)
- Lesley Duncan – background vocals (1, 9)
- Harold McNair – flute (3)
- Danny Thompson – bass (3)
- Tony Carr – drums (3)
- Alan Hawkshaw – piano (3)
- Bobby Ray – bass (7–8)
- Jim Gordon – drums (7–8)
- Gabriel Mekler – keyboards (7–8)
- Ricki – electric guitar (8)
- Don & friends – background vocals (8)
- James Kehn – percussion, drums
- John Paul Jones – bass guitar
- Aynsley Dunbar – drums
- Micky Waller – drums
- Rod Stewart – backing vocals

Technical

- Mickie Most – producer
- Sid Maurer – photography, album design
- Donovan – album design
- Gabriel Mekler – arranger (8)
- Richie Podolor – producer

== Charts ==
Chart (1969)	Peak position
US Billboard Top LPs	23
US Cashbox Top 100 Albums	24
CAN RPM Top 70 Albums	22
