= The Hurdy Gurdy Man =

Studio album by Donovan
- Released: October 1968
- Recorded: January – May 1968
- Genre: Psychedelic rock
- Length: 35:02
- Label: Epic
- Producer: Mickie Most

Donovan chronology
Donovan in Concert (1968)	The Hurdy Gurdy Man (1968)	Barabajagal (1969)

Singles from The Hurdy Gurdy Man
- 1. "Jennifer Juniper" b/w "Poor Cow"" Released: February 1968; 2. "Hurdy Gurdy Man" b/w "Teen Angel"" Released: May 1968

The Hurdy Gurdy Man is the sixth studio album by Scottish singer-songwriter Donovan. It was released in North America in October 1968 on Epic Records, but not in the UK due to a continuing contractual dispute that also prevented Sunshine Superman (1966) and Mellow Yellow (1967) from being released there. A songbook of lead sheets to the album was nonetheless issued in both countries.

== Background ==
Donovan's December 1967 album, the double-disc box set A Gift from a Flower to a Garden had charted in the top 20 in both the US and UK upon its release, following a highly successful North American tour in the fall of 1967. The singer continued to appear on television, plugging his latest single "Jennifer Juniper" in early 1968, which became another hit on both sides of the Atlantic.

In mid-February Donovan joined John Lennon, Cynthia Lennon, George Harrison, Pattie Boyd, Jenny Boyd, Paul McCartney, Jane Asher, Ringo Starr, Mia Farrow, Prudence Farrow and Mike Love in Rishikesh, India to study Transcendental Meditation under Maharishi Mahesh Yogi. While abstaining from drink and drugs (as he had recently called on all his fans to do in the liner notes to Gift) he wrote a number of songs during his stay, while also teaching John Lennon an acoustic picking style which would be featured on several songs on the Beatles' White Album. Donovan stayed a month before returning to England in mid-March to resume his career, including a prestige gig at The Royal Albert Hall on March 21 where he premiered many of the new songs, followed by recording sessions for a new album.

== Songs and recording ==
The recording sessions for The Hurdy Gurdy Man had begun in early January 1968, upon the completion of his North American tour. "Jennifer Juniper" was recorded with string and woodwind arrangements once again undertaken by John Cameron, including distinctive parts for shaker, harp and Cor anglais. The song was written in tribute to Jenny Boyd, Pattie Boyd's little sister who Donovan had a crush on and would proceed to spend time with in Rishikesh. "A Sunny Day" and "The River Song", both co-written with friend Gypsy Dave, had a pastoral feel similar to the songs on the For Little Ones disc of his recent double album.

When the sessions resumed in April 1968, Donovan proceeded to record the title track, which had been written in Rishikesh and would see release as a single on May 24, where it hit the top 5 in both the UK and US. Donovan explained the title character to the song as referring to the enlightened being who would re-awaken ancient knowledge and transform consciousness. The song fused Celtic folk and hard rock with an arrangement by John Paul Jones featuring Donovan on acoustic guitar and tambura, Jones on bass, Clem Cattini on drums and Alan Parker on guitar; over the years Jimmy Page and John Bonham have been rumored (including by Donovan himself) to play on the record, but this has been refuted by Jones. George Harrison wrote a verse for "Hurdy Gurdy Man" when they were in India, but it was cut from the studio version in order to ensure that the song was not overly long for a single.

The sessions lasted into May and included a wide variety of eclectic styles, more so than any other Donovan album. Most of the musicians who had accompanied the singer on his prior albums appeared, including John Cameron, Harold McNair, Danny Thompson and Tony Carr. "The River Song", "Peregrine" and "Tangier" centered on drones, with the latter two featuring Donovan on harmonium. "Tangier" had originally been written by Gypsy Dave under the title "In Tangier Down A Windy Street" and featured Bert Jansch, about whom Donovan had written songs on earlier albums, on acoustic guitar. "Peregrine", which also featured "Candy" John Carr on congas, was written for Harrison in India about their quest to discover themselves. "As I Recall It", "Get Thy Bearings" and "Teas" continued the singer's infatuation with jazz, with "As I Recall It" and "Teas" displaying a strong trad influence while "Get Thy Bearings" has a more progressive feel featuring Harold McNair on saxophone. McNair also played flute on three carefree acoustic numbers in the flower-power fashion, "A Sunny Day", "The Entertaining of a Shy Girl" and "The Sun Is A Very Magic Fellow", the latter co-written with Beatles roadie Mal Evans in India. "West Indian Lady" continued in the same calypso style as the recent single "There Is A Mountain" and For Little Ones' "Lay of the Last Tinker". One of the final songs recorded for the album, "Hi It's Been a Long Time", represented the last time Donovan would work with arranger John Cameron, as the two mutually decided it was time to move on.

The sessions produced a number of additional recordings. "Teen Angel" was the B-side of "Hurdy Gurdy Man", while "Lalena" and "Aye My Love" became the two sides to an American single released that September (although an earlier recording of "Lalena" had been played by Donovan during a British TV appearance that February). "Superlungs" (a song first attempted during sessions for both Sunshine Superman and Mellow Yellow), "Where Is She" and "Happiness Runs" (originally titled "Pebble and the Man" when it first appeared on 1968's Donovan in Concert) would find their way onto 1969's Barabajagal. Additional outtakes included the comedic "What a Beautiful Creature You Are", sung in a duet with Lulu, and "Lord of the Reedy River" which would be re-recorded for 1971's HMS Donovan.

== Album cover art ==
The original sleeve of the album featured a painting by David Richards of a singular red bird flying over a group of reeds floating in water. The back cover featured a simple photo of the artist's face, tinted green, with no musician or photographer credits.

== Release and reception ==
Professional ratings
Review scores
Source	Rating
Allmusic (Original release)	2.5/5 stars
Allmusic (2005 reissue)	4/5 stars
Trax Magazine	4/5 stars
Encyclopedia of Popular Music	4/5 stars

The Hurdy Gurdy Man was released worldwide in October 1968 with the exception of the United Kingdom, where the backlog of releases caused by the contractual hang-ups of 1966 continued to affect his release schedule. The album was another top 20 success in America, his fifth in a row, following the top 5 success of the title track. In Canada the album reached No. 19.

Upon release, Cashbox called it "another collection of low-keyed folkish tales" which would garner quick sales with the artist's teen and college following. Billboard noted "this gem featuring hits "Jennifer Juniper" along with the title track should keep him riding high", with the other selections described as "exceptional". Retrospectively, John Bush at AllMusic opined the songs "featured inventive, sympathetic arrangements, combined with Donovan's usual spot-on delivery" but complained that "the terrible problem of pacing and song placement continually affects Hurdy Gurdy Man, rendering ineffective many solid songs".

== Reissues ==
- On 25 October 1990, Epic Records reissued The Hurdy Gurdy Man (Epic 26420) on CD in the US.
- On 24 October 1994, EMI released Four Donovan Originals (EMI 7243 8 30867 2 6) in the UK. Four Donovan Originals is a CD box set containing four Donovan albums that were not previously released in the UK. The Hurdy Gurdy Man is disc three of that set.
- On 24 May 2005, EMI reissued The Hurdy Gurdy Man (EMI 8735682) on CD in the UK with seven bonus tracks.
- In May 2013, Sundazed reissued The Hurdy Gurdy Man in its rare 1968 mono mix configuration, previously only available as a radio promo LP.
- On 1 October 2018, The state51 Conspiracy reissued The Hurdy Gurdy Man (CON235LP) on LP in the UK and Ireland.

== Track listing ==
=== Original album (US) on LP ===
All tracks credited to Donovan Leitch. According to BMI, "A Sunny Day" and "The River Song" were collaborations with David J. Mills, but "Tangier" was written solely by Mills under its original title of "In Tangier Down a Windy Street". According to the biography of the Beatles assistant Mal Evans by Kenneth Womack, "Working with Donovan, Mal helped craft the breezy, evocative lyrics of 'The Sun Is a Very Magic Fellow'..."

Side one

1. "Hurdy Gurdy Man" – 3:13
2. "Peregrine" – 3:34
3. "The Entertaining of a Shy Girl" – 1:39
4. "As I Recall It" – 2:06
5. "Get Thy Bearings" – 2:47
6. "Hi It's Been a Long Time" – 2:32
7. "West Indian Lady" – 2:15

Side two

1. "Jennifer Juniper" – 2:40
2. "The River Song" – 2:14
3. "Tangier" – 4:10
4. "A Sunny Day" – 1:52
5. "The Sun is a Very Magic Fellow" – 2:42
6. "Teas" – 2:29

=== 2005 CD (EMI, UK) bonus tracks ===
All tracks by Donovan Leitch.

14. "Teen Angel"
15. "Poor Cow"
16. "Laléna"
17. "Aye My Love"
18. "What a Beautiful Creature You Are" (Duet with Lulu)
19. "Colours" (1968 re-recording)
20. "Catch the Wind" (1968 re-recording)

== Cover versions ==
- King Crimson played "Get Thy Bearings" live in 1969 and '71. The song was primarily used as a launching pad for extended improvisation. While Boz Burrell kept close to the original words during 1971, Greg Lake took some liberties with the lyrics in 1969. Recordings of King Crimson performing the song were released on Epitaph, The 21st Century Guide to King Crimson – Volume One – 1969–1974, and Ladies of the Road.
- American rock band the Butthole Surfers recorded a version of "Hurdy Gurdy Man" on their 1991 album Pioughd.
- L.A. Guns covered "Hurdy Gurdy Man" for their 2004 album Rips the Covers Off.
- Steve Hillage covered "Hurdy Gurdy Man" on his progressive rock album L in 1976, backed by Todd Rundgren's Utopia and produced by Rundgren.

== Charts ==
Chart (1968)	Peak position
US Billboard Top LPs	20
US Cashbox Top 100 Albums	18
CAN RPM Top 100 Albums	19
