= Sunshine Superman (album) =

Studio album by Donovan
- Released: 26 August 1966
- Recorded: December 1965 – May 1966
- Studio: Columbia, Hollywood; EMI, London
- Genre: Psychedelia; folk; psychedelic folk; raga rock
- Length: 42:59
- Label: Epic
- Producer: Mickie Most

Donovan chronology
Fairytale (1965)	Sunshine Superman (1966)	Mellow Yellow (1967)

Singles from Sunshine Superman
- 1. "Sunshine Superman" / "The Trip" Released: July 1966

UK version (1967)

Sunshine Superman is the third studio album by Scottish singer-songwriter Donovan. It was released in the United States on 26 August 1966, but was not released in the UK because of a contractual dispute. In June 1967, a compilation of tracks from this album and the follow-up Mellow Yellow was released as Sunshine Superman in the UK.

The album featured Donovan's titular hit single, which was initially released in the US in July 1966. The album was Donovan's most successful, peaking at number 11 in the US and remaining on the Billboard Top LPs chart for six months. The 1967 UK edition peaked at number 25.

The tracks from Sunshine Superman and Mellow Yellow were not mixed into stereo, with the exception of the title track and "Season of the Witch" which appeared in that format on Donovan's Greatest Hits, until the 2011 2-CD deluxe edition issued by UK EMI.

== Background ==
Donovan had enjoyed a year of chart success in both Britain and the United States through 1965, beginning with his first hit "Catch the Wind" that March. However, the singer had been stung by accusations of copying Bob Dylan's look and musical style and was now looking to break out of his established folk image; the jazz-classical backing on "Sunny Goodge Street" from his second album Fairytale pointed in a new direction. Around this same time toward the end of 1965 he suffered a breakup in his relationship with Linda Lawrence, who was unwilling to marry a pop star after a prior relationship (and child) with Brian Jones. The fallout of his relationship with Lawrence would inspire most of the new crop of songs he was writing, in which he pined for her presence and vowed he would win her back again.

In October Donovan's solicitor announced the termination of his contract with managers Peter Eden and Geoff Stephens (who had also co-produced his records up to that point), to be replaced by Ashley Kovack as his business manager and his father Donald Leitch as his personal manager. He signed a new deal with Clive Davis of CBS Records for distribution of his music in America, replacing his old US label Hickory. He was also introduced to producer Mickie Most, who was willing to explore the more progressive musical direction Donovan desired during the upcoming sessions.

== Songs and recording ==
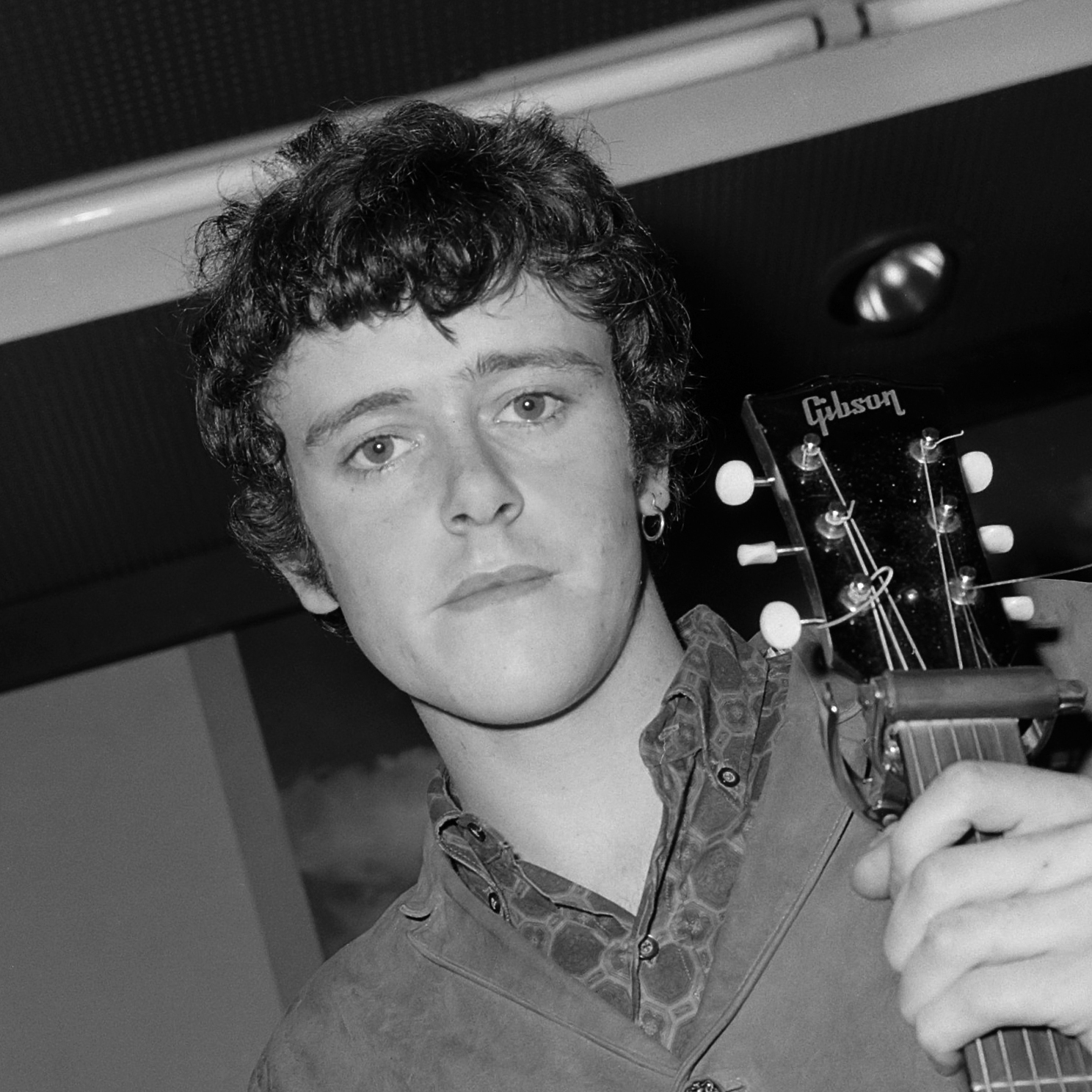
Donovan in 1965, one year before the album's recording

Donovan entered EMI studios at Abbey Road with Mickie Most and new arranger John Cameron on 19 December 1965 to work on the song inspired by his breakup with Lawrence. The word "sunshine" in the song's title was slang for LSD, and the song was given by Cameron a unique musical arrangement of electric bass and double bass, harpsichord, drums, percussion and electric guitars played by Eric Ford (who moved his foot pedal between bass and treble settings to achieve a distinctive sound) and Jimmy Page, which represented some of the first psychedelia on record. Satisfied with the result, most of the same musicians recorded what was intended to be the new single's flip side, "Sunny South Kensington", with the addition of Shawn Phillips on sitar. The single's release was set for 28 January 1966 which would have predated both The Byrds' "Eight Miles High" and The Yardbirds' "Shapes of Things" which, coincidentally, also began work the same week as "Sunshine Superman". The release date was postponed, however, when Donovan's UK label Pye claimed that they could not release a Mickie Most production, since he was contracted to EMI.

Undaunted, Donovan and Most continued to work on the album at Abbey Road through January and February 1966. Innovative chamber arrangements of strings, woodwinds, and harpsichord were added to "Bert's Blues" and "Legend of a Girl Child Linda", both recorded in February. Solo acoustic versions of these songs, along with "Hampstead Incident" and "House of Jansch" which would appear on the following Mellow Yellow, were performed as early as an October 1965 concert at Westfield High School, New Jersey. "Bert's Blues" and "House of Jansch" were penned in tribute to Donovan's friend, British folk personage Bert Jansch, while the artist claimed "Legend of a Girl Child Linda" had come to him in a dream, where he had seen himself composing it. These songs also referenced his intense desire to be with Lawrence, with her first name Linda providing inspiration for the title of the latter song, which was nearly seven minutes long. A similar chamber strings and woodwind arrangement was also recorded for "Guinevere", which was heard when Donovan appeared on Hullabaloo that March, although it would subsequently be re-recorded.

The second phase of the album's recording took place in Los Angeles during the first week of April 1966, where Donovan played a ten day residency at The Trip, a hip Sunset Strip nightclub. Time was booked at CBS Studios where Donovan recorded "Season of the Witch", "The Trip" and the outtake "Superlungs" with a West Coast rock combo that included Bobby Ray on bass, Lenny Maitlin on Hammond organ and "Fast" Eddie Hoh on drums. "The Trip" had been written that week in Hollywood, as Donovan and a friend looked over the Sunset Strip from their guest house while on an acid trip, with references to Dylan, Joan Baez and Linda Lawrence's son Julian. Trouble arose during the recording of "Season of the Witch" when the engineers refused to turn the bass levels up, afraid of moving the needle into the red, before eventually being persuaded after a long conference with Most. "Superlungs" referred to marijuana use but, due to its sensitive subject matter, was left in the can and eventually, after several more attempts to re-record it, released on 1969's Barabajagal.

During that same week a different set of songs, acoustic-based and pioneering a fusion of Celtic folk and Indian music, were recorded. The personnel for these tracks, including "Guinevere", "The Fat Angel", "Ferris Wheel" and "Three King Fishers" included Donovan on acoustic guitar, Shawn Phillips on sitar, "Candy" John Carr on bongos and Peter Pilifian on electric violin. "Guinevere" had been inspired by The Lady of the Land of Faery in Celtic mythology, along with medieval imagery of King Arthur's court. "The Fat Angel" referred to singer Mama Cass of The Mamas & the Papas whom Donovan had befriended during his residency at The Trip, and also namechecked the new San Francisco band Jefferson Airplane; they would return the favor by covering the song at their concerts, eventually appearing on the 1969 live album Bless Its Pointed Little Head. "Ferris Wheel" stemmed from time spent in New York City a month prior with a girl whose hair was cropped because she claimed it had been caught in the strands of a ferris wheel. The final song recorded for the album, "Celeste", was a classically inspired piece featuring acoustic guitar, drums, bass, bouzouki (played by Cyrus Faryar), sitar, electric violin, celeste, and harpsichord.

Besides "Superlungs", other outtakes from the sessions included "Epistle to Dippy" (a January 1967 US single), "Young Girl Blues" (to be included on Mellow Yellow), "Museum" (re-recorded for Mellow Yellow) and "The Land of Doesn't Have to Be", all from the album's January-February sessions in London, along with "Breezes of Patchulie" (originally called "Darkness of My Night" and released on Donovan's 1964 demo collection Sixty Four), given a full band arrangement that April in Los Angeles. The Sunshine Superman recordings of "Superlungs", "Museum" and "Patchulie" were all included on Troubadour The Definitive Collection 1964–1976, while "The Land of Doesn't Have to Be" was a bonus track on the 2005 rerelease of the album.

== Style ==
Whilst still incorporating folk music, these recordings mark a distinct change in Donovan's music, representing some of the first psychedelia released. A full rock band backs up Donovan on many of the songs, and the instrumentation had been expanded, being one of the first pop albums extensively to use the sitar, bouzouki, electric violin and other unique musical instruments. This change is partially the result of working with producer Mickie Most, whose pop sensibilities led to chart hits for many other artists at the time, as well as arranger John Cameron.

The album's lyrical content encompasses Donovan's increasing ability to portray Swinging London and give listeners an insider's look into the mid-sixties pop scene. Donovan's penchant for name-dropping in songs such as those influenced by his stay in Los Angeles, "The Trip" and "The Fat Angel", recount his association with other big rock stars of the day which when coupled with his chart success helped elevate him to superstar status. Contrasting this modern bent was Donovan's fascination with medieval themes in songs such as "Legend of a Girl Child Linda" and "Guinevere", which would greatly influence the coming hippie and flower-power movements. Above all, Donovan's infatuation with Linda Lawrence and the pain of their recent breakup colors nearly every track; he would eventually win her back and the two would marry in 1970.

== Album cover art ==
Donovan had wanted the front cover of the album to be a color illustration by his artist friends Mick Taylor and Sheena McCall, which consisted of a series of pop culture, fantasy, and literary figures (some referenced in the album) arranged in the shape of an "S". Epic Records, however, chose a different sleeve featuring a face picture of the artist in a paisley shirt taken by Barry Feinstein, surrounded by art nouveau lettering of the album title created by Dick Smith. On the back cover, Donovan dedicated the album to "the bearer of the Eastern gift" and also provided brief descriptions for the inspirations to each song. Eventually, the original cover design by Taylor and McCall was used for the UK edition of the album.

== Release ==
The continued contractual dispute with Pye greatly delayed the album's release in Britain. Instead, the album was released by Epic in the US ((Epic Records LN 24217 (monaural) / BN 26217 (stereo)) on 26 August 1966, a week prior to the title track topping the Billboard charts. The stereo edition was "electronically reprocessed", and a true stereo version of the album was not remixed and released until the 2011 deluxe edition. Finally, the album received its UK release (Pye NPL 18181) in June 1967, featuring 7 tracks from the US version of the album combined with 5 from its February 1967 followup Mellow Yellow that had also not seen release in the artist's home country. Donovan was disappointed, as he felt the delayed release had allowed many other innovative 1966-67 recordings to appear to have come first.

The album proved to be his most successful in America outside of 1969's Greatest Hits , charting at number 11, while the UK release peaked at number 25.

Professional ratings
Review scores
Source	Rating
AllMusic	4/5 stars
The Encyclopedia of Popular Music	4/5 stars
The Independent	5/5 stars
MusicHound Rock: The Essential Album Guide	3/5
The Rolling Stone Album Guide	2.5/5 stars

== Reception ==
Upon release, Sunshine Superman received positive reviews in Billboard and Cashbox, with the former calling the material "new and intriguing", singling out "Celeste" as "exceptionally performed" while the latter picked "Season of the Witch", "The Fat Angel" and "Legend of a Girl Child Linda" as "blue ribbon tracks". Paul Williams of Crawdaddy, in a track-by-track review, claimed "what may be overlooked as one remarks upon the sitar, the overdubbing, the electricity, is the fact that this album has a producer, an excellent one. Most ... has translated concept to actuality with remarkable grace" and also favourably compared the album to The Beatles' Revolver, noting that its atmosphere was more consistently applied. Ralph Gleason of the San Francisco Examiner opined it was the best work Donovan had done to date, singling out the title track and "The Fat Angel".

Upon the album's 1967 UK release, Melody Maker's Nick Jones noted that "every number has a mood, an atmosphere, a current along which the perceptive listener can float. Donovan glides playing beautiful guitar and singing his songs like they should be sung—with love." Allen Evens of New Musical Express observed "Donovan pours his sincere vocal mood-making into every track, from the wistfulness of "Season of the Witch" to the bluesiness of "Hampstead Incident" to the fast-paced beatiness of "Sunshine Superman", pointing out John Cameron's attractive arrangements.

Retrospectively, John Bush at AllMusic states "producer Mickie Most fashioned a new sound for the Scottish folksinger, a sparse, swinging, bass-heavy style perfectly complementing Donovan's enigmatic lyrics and delightfully skewed, beatnik delivery" although he notes that "Legend of a Girl Child Linda" "plods on for nearly seven minutes". Reviewing the 2011 stereo special edition, Andy Gill of The Independent called it "powerfully evocative of its era...with psych-rockers such as the title-track balanced by mythic poesie like "Guinevere" and sitar-laced hippie whimsy like "The Fat Angel".

== Legacy ==
Sunshine Superman is often singled out as pioneering due its combination of classical, jazz, Celtic folk, acid rock and raga-rock influences, as well as its lyrical preoccupation with Eastern, medieval and nature themes which would come to define the flower-power movement. To put the album in context, its eclectic arrangements were recorded at the same time Brian Wilson was working on Pet Sounds, and the last day of recording on 6 April 1966 coincided with the first day of work on The Beatles' Revolver. However, because of delays in the album's release, both Pet Sounds and Revolver beat it to the shops, although it paralleled or pre-dated both comparably ambitious works.

In 2017, Sunshine Superman was ranked the 199th greatest album of the 1960s by Pitchfork.

In the video for the Beatles' "A Day in the Life", a close up of a spinning turntable shows the Epic Records version of Sunshine Superman playing. The film was shot at the recording sessions for the song, which was included on Sgt. Pepper's Lonely Hearts Club Band. A cover version of "The Fat Angel" was recorded by Jefferson Airplane for their 1968 live album Bless Its Pointed Little Head. Monster Magnet covered "Three King Fishers" (as "Three Kingfishers") on their 2013 album Last Patrol, with a live version included on 2014's Milking the Stars: A Re-Imagining of Last Patrol.

In June 2011, Donovan performed the entire Sunshine Superman album from start to finish at the Royal Albert Hall in London. He was accompanied by the London Contemporary Orchestra conducted by John Cameron, which also featured many of the musicians who played on the album including Jimmy Page, Shawn Phillips, and Danny Thompson along with his children Astrella Celeste and Donovan Jr. on backing vocals. A DVD of the show was released in time for the album's 40th anniversary in 2016.

== Track listing ==
=== Original US release ===
All tracks are written by Donovan.

Side one

1. "Sunshine Superman" – 3:15
2. "Legend of a Girl Child Linda" – 6:50
3. "Three King Fishers" – 3:16
4. "Ferris Wheel" – 4:12
5. "Bert's Blues" – 3:56

Side two

1. "Season of the Witch" – 4:56
2. "The Trip" – 4:34
3. "Guinevere" – 3:41
4. "The Fat Angel" – 4:11
5. "Celeste" – 4:08

=== UK release ===
Due to the contractual dispute between Pye Records and Epic Records, Donovan's releases were held back in the UK throughout 1966 and early 1967. During this time, Donovan released Sunshine Superman and Mellow Yellow in the US. To catch up to the Epic Records schedule in America, Pye Records compiled a cross-section of both albums and titled it Sunshine Superman.

Side one

1. "Sunshine Superman"
2. "Legend of a Girl Child Linda"
3. "The Observation"
4. "Guinevere"
5. "Celeste"
6. "Writer in the Sun"

Side two

1. "Season of the Witch"
2. "Hampstead Incident"
3. "Sand and Foam"
4. "Young Girl Blues"
5. "Three Kingfishers"
6. "Bert's Blues"

(Titles in italics are from Mellow Yellow)

== Personnel ==
- Donovan – vocals, guitar, organ
- Bobby Ray – bass guitar
- Eddie Hoh – drums
- Shawn Phillips – sitar
- Lenny Maitlin – Hammond organ
- Cyrus Faryar – bouzouki
- Peter Pilifian – electric violin
- John Carr – bongos

On "Sunshine Superman" and other tracks recorded in England:

- Donovan – vocals, acoustic guitar
- Jimmy Page, Eric Ford – electric guitar
- John Cameron – keyboards, arrangement
- Spike Heatley – bass guitar
- Bobby Orr – drums
- Tony Carr – percussion

== Charts ==
Chart (1966)	Peak position
US Billboard Top LPs	11
US Cashbox Top 100 Albums	12
UK Top Albums	25
