= Season of the Witch (song) =

Song by Donovan

from the album Sunshine Superman
- Released: 26 August 1966
- Recorded: 1966
- Studio: Columbia (Hollywood)
- Genre: Psychedelic rock; folk rock; psychedelic pop
- Length: 4:56
- Label: Epic
- Songwriters: Donovan; Shawn Phillips (uncredited)
- Producer: Mickie Most

"Season of the Witch" is a song by the Scottish singer-songwriter Donovan released in August 1966 on his third album, Sunshine Superman. The song is credited to Donovan, although sometime collaborator Shawn Phillips has also claimed authorship. Because of a dispute with Donovan's record company, a UK edition of the song was not released until June 1967. It has been covered many times, including by Lana Del Rey, Robert Plant, Karen Elson, Joan Jett, Al Kooper and Stephen Stills, Hole, Dr. John and the Blues Brothers, Lou Rawls, Richard Thompson, Vanilla Fudge, Terry Reid and Alanis Morissette.

== Composition and recording ==
"Season of the Witch" was recorded at the CBS studios in Hollywood, California, where most of Sunshine Superman was recorded. According to Donovan, he and Phillips wanted a "rock-combo sound" for the song and chose some local musicians from the local clubs. They included Lenny Matlin on keyboards, Don Brown on lead electric guitar, Bobby Ray on bass and "Fast" Eddie Hoh on drums. Donovan played the second guitar part, as he explained in his autobiography:

I played a white Fender Telecaster Electric Guitar on "Witch", chunking down on the chord pattern, wailing a chilling chorus. A major seventh with an open G, to D 9th with a G-flat bass (Bert Jansch chord). The riff is pure feel.

Donovan does not mention the involvement of Jimmy Page and John Paul Jones. At the time, the two future Led Zeppelin members were popular London session musicians and played on other Donovan sessions, including in 1968 for some tracks on The Hurdy Gurdy Man, though Page did not play on the title track of the album; guitarist Alan Parker played all the electric guitar and electric sitar parts on it. However, their exact contributions, if any, to "Season of the Witch" are unknown.

== Critical reception ==
In a retrospective song review for AllMusic, Lindsay Planer commented: "Few songs so perfectly reflect the dawn of the psychedelic pop era as aptly as Donovan's 'Season of the Witch' ... Both lyrically as well as musically, the languid and trippy contents project a dark foreboding atmosphere [and] a sort of sinister tale of paranoia and the paranormal". John Bush called the song "easily [one of the two] highlights of the album ... a chugging eve-of-destruction tale".

== Other versions ==
The song has been covered many times, including by Julie Driscoll with Brian Auger and the Trinity (1967), Vanilla Fudge (1968), Al Kooper and Stephen Stills (1968), Terry Reid (1968), Sam Gopal (1969), Lou Rawls (1969), Pesky Gee! (1969), Suck (1971), Jellyfish (1988), Robert Plant (1994), and Hole (1995).

Cover versions have also been recorded for films and TV series, including by Alanis Morissette for Yaga (2026), Joan Jett and the Blackhearts for The Sons of Sam: A Descent Into Darkness (2021), Lana Del Rey for Scary Stories to Tell in the Dark (2019), Richard Thompson for Crossing Jordan (2003), Dr. John and the Blues Brothers for Blues Brothers 2000 (1998), and Luna for I Shot Andy Warhol (1996). Popdose criticized as "annoying and boring" the versions by the Strangelings in 2007 and Karen Elson for True Blood in 2011.
