= Mellow Yellow =

1966 single by Donovan

Single by Donovan

from the album Mellow Yellow
- B-side: "Sunny South Kensington" (USA); "Preachin' Love" (UK)
- Released: October 1966 (US); February 1967 (UK)
- Recorded: August 1966
- Genre: Pop; psychedelic pop; blues; vaudeville rock; psychedelic folk; folk rock
- Length: 3:42
- Label: Epic 5-10098; Pye 7N 17267
- Songwriter: Donovan
- Producer: Mickie Most

Donovan UK singles chronology
"Sunshine Superman" (1966)	"Mellow Yellow" (1966)	"There Is a Mountain" (1967)

Donovan US singles chronology
"Sunny Goodge Street" (1966)	"Mellow Yellow" (1966)	"Epistle to Dippy" (1967)

"Mellow Yellow" is a song written and recorded by Scottish singer-songwriter Donovan. Released in the US in 1966, it reached No. 2 on the Billboard Hot 100. Outside the US, "Mellow Yellow" peaked at No. 8 in the UK in early 1967.

== Content ==
The song appears to be about a relationship with a fourteen-year old girl called "Saffron". In the first verse, the singer is "just mad about Saffron" and "She's just mad about me". In the second verse "Saffron" is replaced by "Fourteen". When Donovan performed the song live in Anaheim in 1967, he changed the lyrics in this verse to "I'm just mad about fourteen-year-old girls; they're just mad about me."

The song was also rumoured to be about smoking dried banana skins, which was believed to be a hallucinogenic drug in the 1960s, though this aspect of bananas has since been debunked. According to Donovan's liner notes for the album Donovan's Greatest Hits, the rumour that one could get high from smoking dried banana skins was started by Country Joe McDonald in 1966, and Donovan heard the rumour three weeks before "Mellow Yellow" was released as a single.

According to The Rolling Stone Illustrated Encyclopedia of Rock and Roll, he admitted later the song made reference to a vibrator, an "electrical banana" as mentioned in the lyrics. Donovan stated, "I was reading a newspaper and on the back there was an ad for a yellow dildo called the mellow yellow". "Really, you know the 'electric banana' was right in there and gave it away. And that's what the song's about." This definition was re-affirmed in an interview with NME magazine: "it's about being cool, laid-back, and also the electrical bananas that were appearing on the scene — which were ladies' vibrators."

== Recording ==
Donovan had originally written the song as a throwaway sing-a-long for private parties, and was surprised when producer Mickie Most chose it to be the follow up single to "Sunshine Superman". The song was arranged by session musician John Paul Jones and became one of his first to achieve international success. At first, Donovan was disappointed in the horn sound, until Jones came up with the idea to use "hats" (horn mutes) to achieve the required "mellow" mood. In addition, Donovan tuned his acoustic guitar to a D-major drone to mimic slide blues players.

Paul McCartney can be heard as one of the background revelers on this track but, contrary to rumour, the "quite rightly" whispering line in the chorus is not McCartney, but rather Donovan himself. Donovan had a small part in coming up with the lyrics for "Yellow Submarine", so McCartney returned the favor by helping out on the title track and playing uncredited bass guitar on portions of the Mellow Yellow album.

In 2005, the track was remastered by EMI Records for the Mellow Yellow album re-issue.

== Reception ==
Cash Box called "Mellow Yellow" an "easy-going, sophisticated blues number which should be a giant."

== Covers, later recordings and adaptations ==
"Mellow Yellow" was covered in 1967 by soul singer Big Maybelle on her album Got a Brand New Bag. It was also covered in 1968 by British R&B singer/keyboardist Georgie Fame on his album The Third Face of Fame.

In the mid-1980s, the Dairy Farmers of Canada produced a number of television ads for butter that used "Mellow Yellow".

In 1999, "Mellow Yellow" was sung by a group of young adults, among whom were then-unknowns Alex Greenwald, Rashida Jones and Jason Thompson, in Gap's "Everybody in Cords" commercial directed by Pedro Romhanyi. The music mix was done by the Dust Brothers. In 2015, the song was covered by Spanish singer Abraham Mateo for promotion of the film Minions. The original by Donovan was used in the film's ending titles. In Brazil, Michel Teló covered the song, translated into Portuguese, also for the movie. Israeli singer Arik Einstein covered the song in 1967 as "Ani margish k'mo melech" ("I feel like a king").

== Chart performance ==
=== Weekly charts ===
Chart (1966–1967)	Peak position
Australia (Go-Set National Top 40)	7
Australia (Kent Music Report)	8
Austria (Ö3 Austria Top 40)	12
Belgium (Ultratop 50 Flanders)	7
Canada Top Singles (RPM)	2
Germany (GfK)	16
Ireland (IRMA)	15
Netherlands (Dutch Top 40)	14
Netherlands (Single Top 100)	12
New Zealand (Listener)	3
Norway (VG-lista)	7
South Africa (Springbok)	4
UK Singles (Official Charts)	8
US Billboard Hot 100	2
US Cash Box	3
US Record World	1

=== Year-end charts ===
Chart (1967)	Position
Belgium (Ultratop 50 Flanders)	63

== Certifications ==
Region	Certification	Certified units/sales
United States (RIAA)	Gold	1,000,000^{^}
^{^} Shipments figures based on certification alone.
