= Epistle to Dippy =

Single by Donovan
- B-side: "Preachin' Love"
- Released: 27 January 1967
- Recorded: January 1966, Abbey Road Studios, London, England
- Genre: Baroque pop
- Label: Epic 5-10127 (USA)
- Songwriter: Donovan Leitch
- Producer: Mickie Most

Donovan US singles chronology
"Mellow Yellow" (1966)	"Epistle to Dippy" (1967)	"There Is a Mountain" (1967)

Epistle to Dippy is a song and single by Donovan, released in 1967 outside the United Kingdom only.

Written in the form of an open letter to an old friend who had been the saxophone player in their school band The Macabres, the song had a strong pacifist message in addition to its florid psychedelic imagery. The real "Dippy" was, at the time, serving in the British Army in Malaysia. When Dippy heard the song he subsequently contacted Donovan, who was able to buy him out of the armed service. Donovan's manager Ashley Kozak prevented the song from UK release, to avoid controversy over drug-taking implications in the lyric in the wake of the singer's arrest for possession of marijuana six months prior.

The version of the song released as a single stemmed originally from the sessions for Sunshine Superman at EMI Studios in January 1966. Musicians featured include Donovan on vocals and acoustic guitar, Jimmy Page on electric guitar, John Cameron on harpsichord and arrangement, Danny Thompson on bass, and Tony Carr on drums. A string quartet was provided by the Royal Philharmonic Orchestra, led by violinist Pat Halling. A second version of the song was recorded in November 1966 for the Mellow Yellow album, but was passed over for the single in favor of the earlier take; the later take was eventually included as a bonus track on the 2005 Mellow Yellow reissue.

Billboard described the song as a "first rate performance of clever lyric material". Cash Box said the single has an "infectious, near-Eastern flavor and a pulsing undertone".

Chart positions were: #19 (USA Billboard), #10 (USA Cashbox), #10 (USA Record World), and #5 in Canada.
