= Laléna =

Single by Donovan

Single by Donovan
- B-side: "Aye My Love"
- Released: September 1968 (US)
- Recorded: May 1968
- Label: Epic
- Songwriter: Donovan
- Producer: Mickie Most

Donovan USA singles chronology
"Hurdy Gurdy Man" (1968)	"Laléna" (1968)	"Atlantis" (1968)

"Lalena"

Song by Deep Purple

from the album Deep Purple
- Released: 21 June 1969 (US); November 1969 (UK)
- Recorded: January – March 1969 at De Lane Lea, London
- Genre: Hard rock
- Length: 5:06
- Label: Harvest (UK); Tetragrammaton (US); Polydor (Canada)
- Songwriter: Donovan
- Producer: Derek Lawrence

"Laléna" (also spelled "Lalena") is the title of a composition by Donovan, released as a single in 1968.

== History ==
In 2004, Donovan revealed that the song was inspired by the actress Lotte Lenya and that the song's lyrics, addressed to a societally marginalized woman, were Donovan's reaction to Lenya's character in the film version of The Threepenny Opera:

She's a streetwalker, but in the history of the world, in all nations, women have taken on various roles from priestess to whore to mother to maiden to wife. This guise of sexual power is very prominent, and therein I saw the plight of the character. Women have roles thrust upon them and make the best they can out of them, so I'm describing the character Lotte Lenya is playing, and a few other women I've seen during my life, but it's a composite character of women who are outcasts on the edge of society.

"Laléna" was first premiered during a February 17, 1968 appearance on Once More with Felix in an arrangement not dissimilar to the eventual single version, although it also featured a harpsichord as well as a different line of lyric which went "with your days of misery and your nights of revelry". The song was then performed sporadically throughout the year in a jazzier arrangement featuring piano, double bass and flute, sans strings. The single version was recorded during a May 1968 session for The Hurdy Gurdy Man album at Olympic Studios, produced by Mickie Most. John Cameron was the arranger, with session personnel being Harold McNair on flute, Bobby Orr on drums and Danny Thompson on bass with the Royal Philharmonic string quartet.

"Laléna" made its first album appearance in 1969 on Donovan's Greatest Hits and was a bonus track on the 2005 CD reissue of The Hurdy Gurdy Man.

In 1975, Donovan recorded an electric version of the song with Marc Bolan in Munich which has been lost.

In 1978, a bootleg emerged which featured Donovan performing the song in a studio with Paul McCartney on acoustic guitar: this tape was likely made November 1968 at EMI Studios London where McCartney was producing tracks for Mary Hopkin's Postcard, an album on which Donovan played guitar.

== Chart performance ==
In the US, "Laléna" was a top 40 hit single in the autumn of 1968, reaching number 33 on the Hot 100. Donovan was at this time unable to have some of his material released in the UK due to a continuing contractual dispute. The single was also a hit in France, reaching number 22.

== Critical reception ==
Billboard described the single as a "beautiful and intriguing original ballad." Cash Box said that "sweet strings accent a hauntingly beautiful folk-flavored ballad which gets stronger with each listen." Record World said that Donovan "uses his reedy voice exquisitely."

== Television appearances ==
Besides its February 1968 debut on Once More with Felix, Donovan also performed the song during a November 9, 1968 appearance on Hollywood Palace. He also played it on November 17 (broadcast on December 8) for The Smothers Brothers Comedy Hour, along with two other tunes: "Happiness Runs" and "I Love My Shirt".

== Other versions ==
The song has also been recorded by:

- Deep Purple on their 1969 self-titled album.
- Helena Vondráčková (in Czech) on her 1970 album Ostrov Heleny Vondráčkové.
- Jane Olivor on her 1977 album Chasing Rainbows.
- Trini Lopez on his album The Whole Enchilada.
