= Jennifer Juniper =

Single by Donovan

from the album The Hurdy Gurdy Man
- B-side: "Poor Cow"
- Released: 5 February 1968 (UK); 20 February 1968 (USA)
- Recorded: January 1968 CBS Studios, London, England "Poor Cow": 17–18 September 1967
- Genre: Folk pop
- Length: 2:40
- Label: Pye 7N 17457 (UK); Epic 5-10300
- Songwriter: Donovan Leitch
- Producer: Mickie Most

Donovan UK singles chronology
"There Is a Mountain" (1967)	"Jennifer Juniper" (1968)	"Hurdy Gurdy Man" (1968)

Donovan USA singles chronology
"Wear Your Love Like Heaven" (1967)	"Jennifer Juniper" (1968)	"Hurdy Gurdy Man" (1968)

"Jennifer Juniper" is a song and single by the Scottish singer-songwriter Donovan, released in 1968. It peaked at number 5 in the UK Singles Chart, and at number 26 in the Billboard Hot 100. AllMusic journalist Matthew Greenwald noted that "capturing all of the innocence of the era perfectly, it's one of his finest singles".

== Song ==
The track was written about Jenny Boyd, sister of Pattie Boyd, shortly before she went with The Beatles and Donovan to Rishikesh. She married Mick Fleetwood and was, at one time, the sister-in-law of George Harrison and, later, Eric Clapton.

The song was arranged by John Cameron and features a wind section with Cor anglais, flute, French horn and bassoon, plus shaker and harp. The last stanza of the song is sung in French.

Cash Box called it a "gentle voiced ballad" with "glittering arrangement with hushed drumming, soft flute trills and a delightful small combo orchestration" and "pretty lyrics of innocence and naturalist imagery," and also praised the "exquisite artistry." Record World called it a "charming love song" that Donovan "chants in English and French."

Donovan also performed on a novelty cover of the single released in Britain in 1990, by comedy duo Trevor and Simon, as "The Singing Corner Meets Donovan". It spent one week at number 68 in the UK Singles Chart in December 1990.

== B-side ==
The B-side "Poor Cow" is a song produced for the film Poor Cow by Ken Loach. The original title of the song was "Poor Love". The title was changed when the song appeared in the film. It retained that title when released as the B-side to "Jennifer Juniper" in February 1968. "Poor Cow" is introduced by Donovan as "Poor Love" on his live album Donovan in Concert (1968).

Cash Box called "Poor Cow" a "folk theme with jazz touch from the current movie score".

== In popular culture ==
The song features in The Simpsons episode "Flaming Moe", along with a character called Calliope Juniper.

Theodore Bikel covered the song on his album A New Day (1970).

Natalie Portman's character plays this song on the piano in Mr. Magorium's Wonder Emporium.

The song was featured in the 1999 film Election.

17. 12. In 1968, Czech singer Václav Neckář recorded a cover version of this song with Czech lyrics by Zdeněk Rytíř. The song is called "Čaroděj Dobroděj".

Joel Grey recorded the song for his 1969 jazz/pop album Black Sheep Boy

In 1970, an instrumental version was recorded by Dean Christopher and his Orchestra for the album Images.
