= Wear Your Love Like Heaven =

1967 single by Donovan

Single by Donovan

from the album A Gift from a Flower to a Garden
- B-side: "Oh Gosh"
- Released: 6 November 1967
- Recorded: September 1967
- Genre: Sunshine pop
- Length: 2:28
- Label: Epic 5-10253
- Songwriter: Donovan Leitch
- Producer: Mickie Most

Donovan US singles chronology
"There Is a Mountain" (1967)	"Wear Your Love Like Heaven" (1967)	"Jennifer Juniper" (1968)

Audio
- Donovan – Wear Your Love Like Heaven on YouTube

Prussian blue

Alizarin crimson

"Wear Your Love Like Heaven" is a song and US single by Scottish singer-songwriter Donovan, released in 1967. It became the opening track of his 1967 double-disc album A Gift from a Flower to a Garden. It peaked at No. 23 in the Billboard Hot 100.

The song was originally written toward the end of the sessions for A Gift from a Flower to a Garden, after Epic Records head Clive Davis mentioned the lack of a hit single among the songs recorded to date. It was one of just two tracks on the album produced by Mickie Most, the other being the single's B-side "Oh Gosh". The song mentions seven dye and pigment colours, which stemmed from Donovan's love of painting: Prussian blue, scarlet, crimson, Havana lake, rose carmethene, alizarin crimson and carmine.

According to Billboard, the single has a "vital lyric message backed by a solid dance beat". Cash Box said that it has "a message of love that should prove itself one of the chanter’s brightest sellers" and that the "easy-going steady beat lacks the basic drive of 'There Is A Mountain' but puts far more melodic beauty in this side."

== Covers ==
"Wear Your Love Like Heaven"

Song by Eartha Kitt

from the album Sentimental Eartha
- Released: 1970
- Genre: Psychedelic rock; pop; soul
- Songwriter: Donovan Leitch

- Eartha Kitt, on her 1970 album Sentimental.
- They Might Be Giants, as a spoken word piece.
- Sarah McLachlan, for the Donovan tribute album Island of Circles; it also appeared on US printings of her 1991 album Solace.
- Japanese noise artist Masonna perform a noise "cover" of this song on Japanese/American Noise Treaty compilation.
- Peggy Lipton, in a 1970 single that appeared in the Record World "Non-Rock" Top 40.
- A track from Richie Havens' 1969 album, Richard P. Havens, 1983.
- Japanese Duo Singer The Beatniks cover of this song on 2001 Album "M.R.I. Musical Resonance Imaging"
- Guy Davis, son of Ruby Dee and Ossie Davis, included the song on his 2015 album Kokomo Kidd.

== Appearances in other media ==
The song was featured in commercials for Menley & James' Love Cosmetics line in the late 1960s and early 1970s, including an Eau De Love fragrance commercial that featured Ali MacGraw.

It was featured in Season 13 The Simpsons episode "Weekend at Burnsie's" where Homer Simpson (after he smokes medicinal marijuana) gets ready for work and pictures his world as a psychedelic wonderland.

Definition of Sound's "Wear Your Love Like Heaven", a UK Top 20 hit in 1991, is a different song with the same title, but contains samples from the Donovan track.
