= There Is a Mountain =

Single by Donovan
- B-side: "Sand and Foam"
- Released: 26 July 1967 (US); 20 October 1967 (UK)
- Recorded: July 1967, CBS Studios, London
- Genre: Psychedelic pop
- Label: Epic 5-10212 (USA); Pye 7N17403 (UK)
- Songwriter: Donovan Leitch
- Producer: Mickie Most

Donovan (UK) singles chronology
"Mellow Yellow" (1966)	"There Is a Mountain" (1967)	"Jennifer Juniper" (1968)

Donovan (US) singles chronology
"Epistle to Dippy" (1967)	"There Is a Mountain" (1967)	"Wear Your Love Like Heaven" (1967)

"There Is a Mountain" is a song written and performed by Scottish singer-songwriter Donovan in 1967.

== Background ==
The lyrics refer to a Buddhist saying originally formulated by Qingyuan Weixin, later translated by D. T. Suzuki in his Essays in Zen Buddhism, one of the first books to popularize Buddhism in Europe and the US:

Before a man studies Zen, to him mountains are mountains and waters are waters; after he gets an insight into the truth of Zen through the instruction of a good master, mountains to him are not mountains and waters are not waters; but after this when he really attains to the abode of rest, mountains are once more mountains and waters are waters.

Featured musicians are Donovan (vocals and acoustic guitar), Tony Carr on percussion, Harold McNair on flute and arrangement and Danny Thompson on bass. The B-side of the single is "Sand and Foam", an acoustic album cut about a nighttime visit to a Mexican beach Donovan took while on vacation. It was drawn from Mellow Yellow, which was released a few months prior to "There is a Mountain".

Record World described it as "jazzy" and "Latin-styled" with "weird" lyrics.

== Chart performance ==
In New Zealand on the Listener charts it peaked at No. 9.

In the UK, "There Is a Mountain" spent 11 weeks on the charts and peaked at No. 8.

In the US, the song peaked at No. 9 on the Cashbox Top 100. It reached No. 11 on Billboard's Hot 100.

== Cover versions ==
- Kenny Loggins covered the tune in 2009 with his youngest daughter Hana on his album All Join In.
- Dandy Livingstone covered the song in 1967.
- The Bobs covered the song in 1994 for their album The Bobs Cover the Songs of….
- Steve Earle Covered the song on many of the dates on his 2015 Terraplane World Tour, most notably at HSBF in San Francisco and in Donovan's home city of Glasgow on October 27, 2015.
- Wailing Souls covered the song on their 1998 album Psychedelic Souls.
- "Mountain Jam" on The Allman Brothers Band 1972 album Eat A Peach includes the "There Is A Mountain" theme and gives credit to Donovan.
- The Grateful Dead song "Alligator," from the 1968 album Anthem of the Sun includes a "There Is A Mountain" reference at about 9:00.
- Herbie Mann covered the song in 1968 on his album Windows Opened.

== See also ==
- Skadi Mons
