= Barabajagal (song) =

- German release picture sleeve

Single by Donovan and Jeff Beck Group

from the album Barabajagal
- B-side: "Bed With Me"
- Released: June 1969
- Recorded: May 1969
- Studio: Olympic, London
- Genre: Rock
- Length: 3:20
- Label: Pye (7N17778)
- Songwriter: Donovan
- Producer: Mickie Most

Donovan UK singles chronology
"Atlantis" (1968)	"Barabajagal" (1969)	"Riki Tiki Tavi" (1970)

Donovan US singles chronology
"To Susan on the West Coast Waiting/Atlantis" (1969)	"Barabajagal" (1969)	"Riki Tiki Tavi" (1970)

the Jeff Beck Group singles chronology
"Love is Blue" (1968)	"Barabajagal" (1969)	"Got The Feeling" (1972)

Official audio
- "Barabajagal (Love Is Hot)" (2005 Remastered Version) on YouTube

"Barabajagal" is a song by Scottish singer/songwriter Donovan, released by him in 1969. It was later used as title track to the album Barabajagal. The instrumental backing is provided by the Jeff Beck Group, with backing vocals by Lesley Duncan, Suzi Quatro and Madeline Bell.

== Background ==
The song was recorded in May 1969 at the Olympic Studios in London. Other songs were recorded with the Jeff Beck Group but were not released until the reissue of the Barabajagal album in 2005.

The first UK pressings of the single use the full title "Goo Goo Barabajagal (Love Is Hot)" and give the B-side the title "Bed With Me". Subsequent pressings (most UK copies) shorten the title to "Barabajagal" and rename the B-side "Trudi". The title is a made-up name for a seductive lover mentioned in the song. Donovan later clarified that the name was inspired by the phrase "goo goo ga joob" which appears in The Beatles' song "I Am the Walrus". The single is credited to Donovan with Jeff Beck Group. In the US it was always credited as "Goo Goo Barabajagal (Love Is Hot)" by Donovan with the Jeff Beck Group, and with the B-side "Trudi".

It reached No. 12 in the UK Singles Chart and No. 36 in the US chart. It was Donovan's final top 40 entry in either country. In Canada the song reached No. 20 and was his second to last top 40 song.

The instrumental backing is provided by the Jeff Beck Group. In his autobiography, Donovan relates how Jeff Beck's guitar had not been delivered to the studio, so they had to borrow one for him to play on the track (at Beck's request, it was a Fender, his preferred instrument).

In 2005 the track was remastered by EMI Records for the Barabajagal album re-issue.

== Personnel ==
Sources:

- Donovan – acoustic guitar, vocals
- Jeff Beck – electric guitar
- Ronnie Wood – bass
- Madeline Bell – backing vocals
- Micky Waller – drums
- Lesley Duncan – backing vocals
- Suzi Quatro – backing vocals
- Nicky Hopkins – keyboards
- Mickie Most – producer

== Legacy ==
In 1970 a Czech version of the song was issued, as the B-side to "Motejl Modrejl (Mellow Yellow)", by Czech singer and actor Václav Neckář on the Supraphon label.

The song was covered in 1991 by "The Love-in" on Scream Records, UK. (Scream Records, or possibly "From A Whisper to a Scream", were an early 90s UK hip-hop label.)

In 2016 the song was featured in an international Heineken advertisement campaign starring Benicio del Toro.
