= Atlantis (Donovan song) =

1968 single by Donovan

Single by Donovan

from the album Barabajagal
- B-side: "To Susan on the West Coast Waiting"
- Released: 29 November 1968
- Recorded: November 1968
- Genre: Folk rock; psychedelic pop
- Length: 4:58
- Label: Epic; Pye
- Songwriter: Donovan Leitch
- Producer: Mickie Most

Donovan UK singles chronology
"Hurdy Gurdy Man" (1968)	"Atlantis" (1968)	"Barabajagal" (1969)

Donovan US singles chronology
"Laléna" (1968)	"Atlantis" (1968)	"Barabajagal" (1969)

"Atlantis" is a song written and performed by Scottish singer-songwriter Donovan. Produced by Mickie Most for Donovan's seventh studio album Barabajagal (1969), the song tells of the mythological antediluvian civilization of Atlantis. Donovan states in his 2005 autobiography The Hurdy Gurdy Man that the song was originally inspired by his reading the 1886 occult novel A Dweller on Two Planets, along with similar legends of early civilizations found in Irish legends of the Tuatha Dé Danann and the Vedas of ancient India. However, the description of Atlantis in the song's lyrics draws quite heavily on Ignatius L. Donnelly's 1882 book, Atlantis: The Antediluvian World.

The song has a somewhat unusual structure for a pop song, with the first section of the song being an extended spoken prose-poem over an instrumental background. This is followed by a sung coda consisting mainly of a repeated three-line verse (Way down below the ocean / where I want to be / She may be), with overdubbed interjections.

The song was first released by Pye Records as a single in 1968 and became a worldwide success. It reached number one in the Netherlands and in Switzerland in 1969, while also reaching the top five in the Austria, New Zealand, and West Germany. In the United States, it was initially released as the B-side to "To Susan on the West Coast Waiting", but was promoted to the A-side after receiving significant airplay, eventually reaching number seven on the US Billboard Hot 100. In the singer's native country, the single managed only a modest number 23 on the UK Singles Chart.

"Atlantis" has since been recorded by several artists, including Austrian singer Georg Danzer, German musical project U96 and German actor Thorsten Feller. In 2001, Donovan and German pop band No Angels re-recorded the track for the closing credits of the Walt Disney Feature Animation picture Atlantis: The Lost Empire (2001). Included on a concomitant album for the German-speaking music market, it was once more released as a single and re-entered the top five in Austria and Germany.

== Background ==
"Atlantis" was written by Donovan and credited as produced by Mickie Most for his seventh studio album Barabajagal (1969).

Donovan stated his inspiration for the song came from his reading of Frederick Oliver's A Dweller on Two Planets, who claimed to have transcribed it from a being named Phylos the Thibetan. He then wrote a poem over chords taught to him by mentor Derroll Adams, and recorded it at American Recording Company in Los Angeles with producer Gabriel Mekler in early November 1968, at the completion of a North American tour. Mekler played piano on the track, devising chord shapes with the pedal open, while Donovan created a harp-like sound by striking the strings of a grand piano with a quill. Donovan wanted a guitarist to play a solo on the record but as no guitarist had been booked, he used an engineer named Rick who played a Fender Stratocaster. Although Donovan and Mekler had produced the recording, Most, his usual producer, received the producer credit.

Paul McCartney was rumored to have sung backing vocals for the song. However, Donovan said in a 2008 interview with Goldmine Magazine that McCartney was not involved in the recording sessions.

The introduction of song is a quiet monologue spoken over the song's repeated musical melody, telling of the mythological antediluvian civilization of Atlantis. The second half of the song is more energetic, with Donovan singing of finding his true love in Atlantis. The theme is common for the 1960s: fanciful mythology as a symbol of the counterculture movement, with the hope that true love will be found if Atlantis can be rediscovered.

== Release and reception ==
Contract disputes at the time caused a complicated series of different releases in the United Kingdom and United States. "Atlantis" was originally released in the United Kingdom on November 29, 1968 as a single with "I Love My Shirt" as the B-side. In January 1969 it was released in the US as the B-side to "To Susan on the West Coast Waiting", before appearing on the album Barabajagal that August. The LP was not released in the UK.

The song was not deemed likely to be a hit in the US because of its length and the fact that the first third of the song is spoken prose and therefore not "radio-friendly". It was for this reason that, despite its success in Europe, "Atlantis" was demoted to B-side status. However, the record company A&R executives were proved wrong when the popularity of "Atlantis" far surpassed that of its A-side. The song was quite successful, reaching number seven on the Billboard charts. It became Donovan's final top-10 single in the US.

== Track listings ==
All tracks written by Donovan Leitch and produced by Mickie Most.

UK 7-inch single
No.	Title	Length
1.	"Atlantis"	4:54
2.	"I Love My Shirt"	3:55

US 7-inch single
No.	Title	Length
1.	"To Susan On the West Coast Waiting"	3:13
2.	"Atlantis"	4:54

== Charts ==
=== Weekly charts ===
Weekly chart performance for "Atlantis"
Chart (1968–1969)	Peak position
Australia (Go-Set)	15
Austria (Ö3 Austria Top 40)	4
Belgium (Ultratop 50 Flanders)	9
Belgium (Ultratop 50 Wallonia)	17
Canada Top 100 (RPM)	12
Ireland (IRMA)	13
Netherlands (Dutch Top 40)	1
New Zealand (Listener)	2
Switzerland (Schweizer Hitparade)	1
UK Singles (Official Charts)	23
US Billboard Hot 100	7
US Cash Box Top 100	9
West Germany (GfK)	2

=== Year-end charts ===
Year-end chart performance for "Atlantis"
Chart (1969)	Position
Switzerland (Schweizer Hitparade)	4

== Release history ==
Release history for "Atlantis"
Region	Date	Ref(s)
United Kingdom	November 1968	
United States	March 1969	

== Georg Danzer version ==
"Atlantis"

Single by Georg Danzer

from the album Menschliche Wärme
- Released: 3 January 1984
- Length: 4:37
- Label: Polydor
- Songwriters: Donovan Leitch; Georg Danzer
- Producer: Georg Danzer

Georg Danzer singles chronology
"Zombieball" (1983)	"Atlantis" (1984)	"Weiße Pferde" (1984)

In 1984, Austrian musician Georg Danzer published a German-language version of the song, which has remained musically faithful to the original. First published on his album Menschliche Wärme, it appeared in the later course on the compilations Greenpeace, Hit Barometer and Überblicke. In Austria, it became a top 20 hit on the Ö3 Austria Top 40.

=== Track listings ===
7-inch single

1. Atlantis - 4:25
2. Die Türken - 4:55

CD single

1. "Atlantis" (radio edit) - 3:44
2. "Atlantis" (acoustic edit) - 3:50

=== Charts ===
Weekly chart performance for "Atlantis"
Chart (1984)	Peak position
Austria (Ö3 Austria Top 40)	19

== No Angels version ==
"Atlantis"

Single by No Angels
- A-side: "When the Angels Sing"
- Released: 19 November 2001
- Studio: Park (Tutzing, Germany)
- Length: 4:14
- Label: Cheyenne; Polydor; Zeitgeist
- Songwriters: Donovan Leitch; Leslie Mándoki; Laszlo Bencker
- Producer: Leslie Mándoki

No Angels singles chronology
"There Must Be an Angel" (2001)	"Atlantis" / "When the Angels Sing" (2001)	"Something About Us" (2002)

=== Production and recording ===
In the late 1990s, Walt Disney Feature Animation started production on Atlantis: The Lost Empire, an animated science fiction/action film, based on the Atlantis saga. Interested in slipping his 1968 version into the film soundtrack, Donovan immediately opened negotiations with the studios; however Disney was barely interested in the song and plans eventually fell through. By 2000, Disney had committed German producer Leslie Mándoki to produce a concomitant album for the German-speaking music markets, entitled Stars Inspired by Atlantis. After stumbling over the original song, Mándoki approached Donovan by phone, describing him his idea of a collaboration with German newcomers No Angels, with whom Mándoki had previously worked on their debut Elle'ments (2001), and a few days later Donovan and the band met at the Lake Starnberg to start recording.

=== Release and reception ===
"Atlantis" served as the band's fourth single along with "When the Angels Sing", a midtempo ballad from their debut album Elle'ments (2001). Physical CD singles of the double-A single were released on 19 November 2001 by Cheyenne Records. The maxi single includes the duet version, the Submarine Mix of "Atlantis" and three new remixes "When the Angels Sing".

Upon its release, "Atlantis" / "When the Angels Sing" debuted at No. 5 on the German Singles Chart in the week of 3 December 2001. It spent six weeks within the top 10 and fell out of the chart in the 14th weeks, becoming the 79th highest-selling single of 2001 in Germany. In Austria, the double-A single debuted at No. 10 on the Ö3 Austria Top 40. It peaked at No. 5 in its third week and spent four more weeks within the top 10, leaving the top 75 after 14 weeks. In Switzerland, "Atlantis" / "When the Angels Sing" entered the Swiss Hitparade at No. 56 in the week of 2 December. It reached its peak, No. 16, in its second week, becoming the band's first single to miss the top 10. It fell out of the top 100 after twelve weeks on the chart.

=== Music video ===
The single's music video was directed by Hannes Rossacher for DoRo Productions and shot in Berlin, Germany in late 2001. It shows Donovan and the band in a recording studio accented by underwater settings, backdrops, and scenes inspired by the animated movie.

=== Track listings ===
Maxi single
No.	Title	Writer(s)	Producer(s)	Length
1.	"Atlantis" (radio mix)	Donovan Leitch; Leslie Mándoki; Laszlo Bencker	Mándoki	4:14
2.	"When the Angels Sing" (new radio mix)	Peter Ries; Charlemaine Thomas-Schmidtmer	Ries	3:47
3.	"When the Angels Sing" (Christmas mix)	Ries; Thomas-Schmidtmer	Ries	3:56
4.	"When the Angels Sing" (Special X-Mas mix)	Ries; Thomas-Schmidtmer	Ries	4:08
5.	"Atlantis" (Submarine mix)	Leitch; Mándoki; Bencker	Mándoki	4:00

=== Personnel ===
Personnel are adapted from the liner notes of Elle'ments.

- Nadja Benaissa – vocals
- Laszlo Bencker – keyboards, bass
- Lucy Diakovska – vocals
- Pit Floss – additional engineering
- Felix Knöchel – assistant engineer
- George Kopecsni – acoustic guitar
- Leslie Mándoki – production, drums, percussion
- Sandy Mölling – vocals
- Vanessa Petruo – vocals
- Mike "Spike" Streefkerk – mixing
- Jessica Wahls – vocals
- Peter Wölpe – guitar
- Stefan Zeh – additional engineering

=== Charts ===
==== Weekly charts ====
Weekly chart performance for "Atlantis" / "When the Angels Sing"
Chart (2001–2002)	Peak position
Austria (Ö3 Austria Top 40)	5
Europe (Eurochart Hot 100)	25
Germany (GfK)	5
Switzerland (Schweizer Hitparade)	16

==== Year-end charts ====
Year-end chart performance for "Atlantis" / "When the Angels Sing"
Chart (2002)	Position
Austria (Ö3 Austria Top 40)	25
Germany (Media Control)	79

=== Certifications ===
Certifications for "Atlantis" / "When the Angels Sing"
Region	Certification	Certified units/sales
Austria (IFPI Austria)	Gold	20,000^{*}
Germany (BVMI)	Gold	250,000^{^}
^{*} Sales figures based on certification alone.^{^} Shipments figures based on certification alone.

== Other cover versions ==
- In 1993, doom metal band Trouble released a cover of Atlantis, with additional material, on their album Manic Frustration and titled it "Breathe..."
- In 1999, German actor Thorsten Feller covered the song under the pseudonym Feller.
- In 2000, Donovan did a parody version for his cameo in the Futurama episode "The Deep South", in which he describes the lost city of Atlanta.
