= Slow Down World =

Studio album by Donovan
- Released: May 1976
- Recorded: August 1975 – March 1976
- Studio: A&M, Los Angeles
- Genre: Folk
- Length: 39:21
- Label: Epic
- Producer: Donovan Leitch

Donovan chronology
7-Tease (1974)	Slow Down World (1976)	Donovan (1977)

Slow Down World is the thirteenth studio album (fifteenth overall) by Scottish singer/songwriter Donovan, released in the United States (Epic PE 33945) in May 1976 and the United Kingdom (Epic SEPC 86011) on 4 June 1976.

== Background ==
Over his past few album releases, Donovan had hired a succession of popular record producers in hopes of chart success: Mickie Most for Cosmic Wheels, Andrew Loog Oldham for Essence to Essence and Norbert Putnam for 7-Tease. The success of these albums was mild at best, and indicated a shift in Donovan's popularity away from the superstardom of the 1960s and towards a distinctly smaller fan base. For his next album, Donovan decided to embrace this fan base by taking on the producer duties himself and writing a set of songs that were directly at odds with the popular sounds of the time. While Slow Down World does contain some upbeat numbers, many of the songs feature tired and resigned lyrics.

Two of the songs on Slow Down World were written by Donovan's longtime friend Derroll Adams. Adams was the influence behind "Epistle to Derroll" from Donovan's 1968 album A Gift from a Flower to a Garden. Donovan's hit "There Is a Mountain" has similar lyrics to "The Mountain", one of the Derroll Adams songs covered here.

Slow Down World reached #174 on the US charts, matching the success of Essence to Essence but not reaching the success of Donovan's last album, 7-Tease. More importantly, Slow Down World marked the last album of his Epic Records contract. Without access to the label's promotion mechanisms, he never again achieved chart success or the same level of record sales.

== Reissues ==
- On 19 April 2004, Diablo Records released 7-Tease/Slow Down World (DIAB8052) in the UK on CD. This compilation includes all of 7-Tease and all of Slow Down World on one disc, and marks the first time all of Slow Down World was released on CD.

Professional ratings
Review scores
Source	Rating
Allmusic	link
Christgau's Record Guide	C−

== Track listing ==
All tracks by Donovan Leitch, except where noted.

=== Original album ===
==== Side one ====
1. "Dark-Eyed Blue Jean Angel" – 3:50
2. "Cryin' Shame" – 4:29
3. "The Mountain" (Derroll Adams) – 3:32
4. "Children of the World" – 3:22
5. "My Love Is True (Love Song)" (Adams) – 3:41

==== Side two ====
1. "A Well Known Has-Been" – 7:25
2. "Black Widow" – 5:44
3. "Slow Down World" – 4:22
4. "Liberation Rag" – 2:56

== Personnel ==
- Donovan – vocals, acoustic guitar, harmonica
- Philip Donnelly – guitar
- Wilton Felder, David Hungate, Klaus Voormann, Lee Sklar – bass guitar
- David Foster – keyboards
- Jay Graydon – synthesizer, programming
- Jim Keltner – drums
- Bobbye Hall, Emil Richards – percussion
- Tom Scott – saxophone
- Chuck Findley – trumpet, flugelhorn
- Lew McCreary – trombone
- Douglas Davis – cello
- Al DeLory, B.J. Cook, Donny Gerrard, Ed Whitting, Jeanette Clinger, Jennifer Hicklin, John Merlino, Julia Waters, Maxine Waters, Ron Hicklin, Stacy Jo Clinger, Susie Ives – background vocals
- John Kosh— Art Direction, Album Cover Design
