= Hurdy Gurdy Man (disambiguation) =

"Hurdy Gurdy Man" is a 1968 song by the Scottish singer-songwriter Donovan.

Hurdy Gurdy Man or The Hurdy Gurdy Man may also refer to:

- A man who plays the hurdy-gurdy
- "Der Leiermann" ("The Hurdy Gurdy Man"), from the song cycle Winterreise by Franz Schubert, 1827
- "Hurdy Gurdy Man" (The Spectres song), 1966
- The Hurdy Gurdy Man, an album by Donovan, 1968
- The Hurdy Gurdy Man, the autobiography of Donovan, 2005
- The Hurdy Gurdy Man (EP), by the Butthole Surfers, 1990

== See also ==
- Hurdy-gurdy (disambiguation)
