= Open Road =

Open Road may refer to:

== Music ==
- Open Road (Donovan album), a 1970 album by Donovan and his band
- Open Road (band), the group Donovan formed to record and tour in 1970 that continues to perform after his departure
- Open Road (Gary Barlow album), 1997 album by Gary Barlow
- "Open Road" (Gary Barlow song), the titular track from Gary Barlow's 1997 album Open Road
- Open Road (Cowboy Junkies album), a 2001 album by Cowboy Junkies
- "Open Road" (Bryan Adams song), a song from Bryan Adams' 2004 album Room Service'
- "Open Road" (Jude Cole song), a song from Jude Cole's 1992 album Start the Car
- "Open Road," a single from Bret Michaels' 2005 album Freedom of Sound
- The Open Road (album), a 2010 album by John Hiatt
- Open Road (The Rippingtons album), a 2019 album by The Rippingtons

== Films ==
- The Open Road (1911 film), an American silent film
- The Open Road (1926 film series)
- Open Road, a 2008 short film starring Andy Picheta
- The Open Road, a 2009 film written and directed by Michael Meredith
- Open Road (2012 film), a film directed by Márcio Garcia

== Other ==
- The Open Road (novel), a 1951 novel by Jean Giono
- OpenROAD (Open Rapid Object Application Development), a programming language and a product of Actian Corporation
- Open Road (XM), an XM Satellite Radio channel
- Open Road Recordings, a Canadian country music record label
- Open-road racing, a form of car racing
- The Open Road for Boys, a boys' magazine from the early 20th century
- Open Road Films, an American independent motion pictures studio
- Song of the Open Road (poem), a poem by Walt Whitman
