= Live in Japan: Spring Tour 1973 =

Live in Japan – Spring Tour 1973

Live album by Donovan
- Released: 1973
- Recorded: 25–26 March 1973
- Genre: Folk
- Length: 45:23
- Label: Epic
- Producer: Toshiyuki Sugano

Donovan chronology
Cosmic Wheels (1973)	Live in Japan – Spring Tour 1973 (1973)	Essence to Essence (1973)

Live in Japan – Spring Tour 1973 is the twelfth album from Scottish singer-songwriter Donovan. It was only released in Japan (Epic ECPM 25) in 1973 designed by John Kosh. In 2023, the 50th anniversary of the original release, Donovan's website released the first CD version of the album.

== History ==
The tracks on Live in Japan – Spring Tour 1973 were recorded at Donovan's 25 and 26 March, 1973 shows in Osaka. Around the time of this concert, Donovan released Cosmic Wheels, and had started recording Essence to Essence. With the exception of "Hurdy Gurdy Man", the songs on this set avoid Donovan's chart hits of the 1960s in favor of more obscure and even unreleased songs.

The recordings of "Sadness" and "Universal Soldier" were also included in the 1990 album Rising.

== Album origins of tracks ==
The following is a list explaining the original releases of each song. Tracks that were previously unreleased are noted with *, followed by explanations of their origin.

- "Hurdy Gurdy Man" (1968 single release)
- "Only the Blues" (from Cosmic Wheels, released March 1973)
- "Sadness" (from 7-Tease, released November 1974)
- "A Working Man"* (no studio version released)
- "Your Broken Heart" (from 7-Tease, released November 1974)
- "Universal Soldier" (from The Universal Soldier EP, released 15 August 1965)
- "The Dignity of Man" (from Essence to Essence, released December 1973)
- "Hey Gyp (Dig the Slowness)" (B-side of "Turquoise", released 30 October 1965)
- "Tinker Tune"* (no studio version released)
- "Living for the Love Light"* (from Lady of the Stars, released January 1984)
- "Josie" (1966 single, from the album What's Bin Did and What's Bin Hid, released 14 May 1965)
- "Sailing Homeward"* (from Essence to Essence)
- "The Ferryman's Daughter"* (from Gaelia, released 2 December 2022)
- "Life Is a Merry-Go-Round" (from Essence to Essence)

== Track listing ==
All tracks by Donovan Leitch, except where noted.

=== Original album ===
==== Side one ====
1. "Hurdy Gurdy Man" – 3:17
2. "Only the Blues" – 3:20
3. "Sadness" – 3:04
4. "A Working Man" – 3:07
5. "Your Broken Heart" – 3:42
6. "Universal Soldier" (Buffy Sainte-Marie) – 2:48
7. "The Dignity of Man" – 4:45

==== Side two ====
1. "Hey Gyp (Dig the Slowness)" – 2:26
2. "Tinker Tune" – 2:47
3. "Living for the Love Light" – 2:53
4. "Josie" – 3:21
5. "Sailing Homeward" – 3:23
6. "The Ferryman's Daughter" – 2:38
7. "Life Is a Merry-Go-Round" – 3:52
