= Eco-Song =

Studio album by Donovan
- Released: 2019
- Studio: Estudi 1 (Calma Estudios) (remastering)
- Genre: Pop
- Label: Donovan Discs
- Producer: (various)

Donovan chronology
Shadows of Blue (2013)	Eco-Song (2019)	Lunarian (2021)

Eco-Song is a theme album by Scottish singer songwriter Donovan. It is a compilation album of 21 songs taken from his catalog and described as "climate change songs". The album, which was mastered at Estudi 1 in Llevant, Majorca, is ascribed to "Donovan & Linda", giving co-credit to Donovan's wife and muse, Linda Lawrence. Eco-Song is dedicated to climate change activist Greta Thunberg. The songs are intended as the soundtrack for an opera by Donovan and Sebastian Dean, to be titled Slow Down World, based on the plot of four young students in Cork involved in a climate strike.

Donovan's plans to take the album on tour did not materialize due to the COVID-19 pandemic, but his performances at Cadogan Hall on 12 October 2020 included selections from the album.

It took 50 years from my first climate change protest song in 1968 and now, at last, here comes Greta the Great! It’s about time... and we have so little time left!

— Donovan

== Track listing ==
1. "Diggin’ The Future Now!" (2010)
2. "Slow Down World" (1976)
3. "The Voice Of Protest" (1974)
4. "No Hunger" (1976)
5. "The Great Song Of The Sky" (1974)
6. "Children Of The World" (1976)
7. "Yellow Star" (1973)
8. "Cryin' Shame" (1976)
9. "Riki Tiki Tavi" (1970)
10. "How Silly" (1974)
11. "We Are One" (1980)
12. "The Crunch" (1970)
13. "Brave New World" (1977)
14. "Only To Be Expected" (1980)
15. "Comin' To You" (1980)
16. "Neutron" (1980)
17. "You Do Belong (Teenage Suicide)" (1993)
18. "Lord Of The Universe" (1970)
19. "The Blame Game" (2013)
20. "Save The World" (1995)
21. "Operating Manual For Spaceship Earth" (1973)
