= Mac MacLeod =

English folk and blues musician (1941–2020)

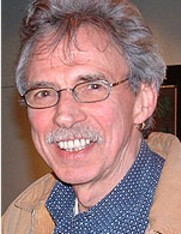

Background information
- Also known as: Mac MacLeod
- Born: Keith MacLeod; 9 July 1941
- Origin: St Albans, Hertfordshire, England
- Died: 16 November 2020 (aged 79)
- Genres: Folk; blues; rock
- Occupations: Singer; songsriter; musician
- Instruments: Vocals; guitar; bass; sitar; flute
- Years active: 1959–2020
- Labels: Gazell; RPM UK
- Website: MacMacLeod.co.uk

Keith "Mac" MacLeod (9 July 1941 – 16 November 2020), was an English musician who was a part of the Hertfordshire folk and blues scene from 1959 onwards. He played in St Albans alongside Mick Softley and Maddy Prior and toured with John Renbourn. Influences include Softley, Ramblin' Jack Elliott, Derroll Adams, Jesse Fuller, Big Bill Broonzy, Snooks Eaglin, Reverend Gary Davis and Davey Graham.

MacLeod was an early influence on Donovan, and was the bassist for the original line-up of Hurdy Gurdy which also inspired the Donovan song "The Hurdy Gurdy Man". MacLeod has also worked with Argent. Other bands MacLeod formed of note include Soft Cloud, Loud Earth with Mick Softley and the acoustic-based band Amber.

== Biography ==
Keith MacLeod was born in St Albans, Hertfordshire, on 9 July 1941.

=== The St Albans crowd and beyond ===
In the early days in The Cock and later The Peahen pubs, MacLeod was a regular and one of the few finger pickers around. He often played with other musicians of note: the flat picking Mick Softley and school friend Maddy Prior. In the summer time MacLeod travelled to the South West where he made friends with John Renbourn. The two busked together from around 1961 to 1964.

In 1964 MacLeod and Renbourn recorded three or four demos together; 'South Coast', 'Cocaine', 'It Hurts Me Too' and 'Train Blues'. Donovan was influenced from 1961 onwards by MacLeod's finger picking and the flat pick styles made popular by Ramblin' Jack Elliott which had been a big inspiration on Mick Softley and 'Dirty Hugh'. MacLeod taught Donovan claw hammer style and finger pick techniques (see Hurdy Gurdy) and many songs from his folk blues heroes. Donovan said in an interview for Beat Instrumental in May 1965 titled 'Donovan's Big Influence? It's Not Dylan!' "The man who encouraged and helped me most was a fellow called Keith 'Mac' MacLeod. I've known him for about three years, and he's taught me everything from chord progressions on the guitar, to how to appreciate folk and real blues".

In the summer of 1964 MacLeod was back in Torquay, this time Donovan joined him for his final summer before fame came knocking. MacLeod joined Donovan's first national tour of Britain which kicked off at the NME poll winners' party on 11 April 1965. Donovan's set has been called the first folk-rock gig by music writer Richie Unterberger. One of the tour dates saw Donovan and MacLeod playing on stage with Joan Baez.

After Donovan's first UK tour MacLeod teamed up first with Dana Gillespie then with another regular on the St Albans music scene, Maddy Prior, to form Mac & Maddy. A demo tape of Mac & Maddy was made but has subsequently been lost. Donovan has since the early 1990s changed his stories as regards MacLeod's influence, naming 'Dirty Hugh' or 'Dirty Phil' as his finger picking teacher and John Vanstone as his early guitar mentor, removing MacLeod's name from the story. However, no interviews with him from the 1960s mention either 'Dirty Hugh', 'Dirty Phil' or John Vanstone. A guitarist called 'Dirty Hugh' (so called because he dressed in rags) played at 'The Cock', but he could only strum and flat pick the guitar, he could not finger pick and therefore was unable to teach Donovan that art. Donovan's first two albums included many songs that he learnt from MacLeod as revealed in Pete Frames ZigZag Wanderer No.5 March 1999 and in the Nigel Cross interviews for Terrascope

=== Sweden, Denmark and back again ===
MacLeod's odyssey was to take him around Britain, and across Sweden and Denmark. The anthology Mac MacLeod – The Incredible Musical Odyssey of the Original Hurdy Gurdy Man on RPM/Cherry Red Records contains many rare recordings, from the acoustic folksy beginnings through a succession of one-off groups like The Other Side (with Boz Scaggs) and Exploding Mushroom, to the Hurdy Gurdy (with producers Rod Argent and Chris White). The group became an underground favourite and went on to headline at Middle Earth, supporting Pink Floyd at the same venue.

=== Hurdy Gurdy ===
MacLeod was the lead singer and bassist in a power trio style group in Denmark (inspired by Cream) which he named Hurdy Gurdy. The group sound was heading in a similar direction to The Jimi Hendrix Experience who had also started at around the same time. After a run-in with the law, MacLeod had written to Donovan's manager, Ashley Kozak, in December 1967 and asked if he could help. Donovan then penned them a song and "Hurdy Gurdy Man" was the result. However, Donovan changed his mind on his gift of the song to MacLeod and recorded it himself.

Donovan explained the story to Keith Altham of the NME on 15 June 1968 (a different version of the article appeared in Hit Parader December 1968, but also with the MacLeod link being mentioned):

"Hurdy Gurdy Man" was originally written for a Danish group by that name (...). There is a friend of mine in the group – Mac MacLeod – whom I looked to in the early days to learn how to pick the guitar. I wrote the song especially for them but then we got into a disagreement over how it was to be produced. I wanted to do it one way and they another. So I said, 'Right then – I'll do it myself because I think it's good enough for a single.' So I did it. And it's out. And doing very nicely, thank you.

In addition to the above article, Donovan also confirmed the genesis of the "Hurdy Gurdy Man" song to Melody Maker in July 1968, during an interview with Tony Wilson.

Donovan had written the song before going to India with The Beatles, and handed a demo tape to MacLeod to work from; he had originally wanted the song to be gentle and angelic but what Hurdy Gurdy played was more like heavy metal. It was during this time in India that Donovan taught John Lennon and Paul McCartney the fingerpicking styles he had learned from MacLeod; this resulted in songs like "Julia" and "Blackbird" being recorded for the so-called White Album (The Beatles). Donovan has also stated that George Harrison added an extra verse to the "Hurdy Gurdy Man" song while they were in India.

MacLeod encountered problems with work permits for the Danish members of the group during their stay in England, so the other members went back to Denmark, still under the name Hurdy Gurdy, and recorded an album for CBS Records.

=== From Skye to Soft Cloud ===
After the demise of Hurdy Gurdy, MacLeod recorded with the post-The Zombies: Argent whose song "Telescope" was a lost classic until released on MacLeod's Anthology. Macleod also played bass on two other Argent tracks, "To Julia" and "Girl Help Me".

At the end of the 1960s MacLeod was reunited with Donovan who whisked him off, with a group of other old friends, to the Isle of Skye. MacLeod was asked to be a sideman once more for Donovan's US tour with Candy Carr, which was to be the prototype 'Open Road' band. After several weeks of rehearsals all was well acoustically, however when the band went electric it did not work out as well as Donovan hoped. Rather than rehearse the new electric approach, Donovan had a change of heart and went to the U.S. alone.

MacLeod returned to St Albans and formed Soft Cloud-Loud Earth with Mick Softley, 'Candy' John Carr (who also went to Skye for Donovan's U.S. tour line-up) and Mike Thomson. Due to the erratic behaviour of Softley, Carr and Thomson jumped ship and soon formed Open Road with Donovan, leaving MacLeod to continue with Softley in the duo Soft Cloud. After Soft Cloud had evaporated MacLeod formed a new band, the sitar-drenched Amber with Julian McAllister and Ray Cooper. Amber had some tracks produced by former The Yardbirds singer Keith Relf.

=== Silverlining ===
After many years out of the music industry MacLeod returned with a new band, Silverlining, in 1999. He continued to play live both solo and with a full band line-up (sometimes including his old school friend The Kinks' and The Zombies' bassist Jim Rodford) and he made plans for another album. He also added flute to the new St Albans band Maya on their new album Revelations, and supplied some guitar for the band The Coming. Pete Frame, author of Rock Family trees, has also written a special edition of Zigzag Wanderer entitled 'Catching Dreams From the Clouds' all about MacLeod's early days.

=== Later years ===
MacLeod was in communication with Donovan, first when he co-nominated him for his Honorary Doctorate at the University of Hertfordshire in November 2003. and later Donovan's birthday on 10 May 2005 (where he met up with old friend Gyp Mills) where MacLeod was a special guest. On 9 June that year Donovan and MacLeod played together again on stage at Oxford; the last time they played onstage together was during Donovan's first UK tour in 1965. MacLeod had a new more acoustic based album in the works. MacLeod had a recent reunion with his old Amber partner Julian McAllister and he was also in touch with his old friends John Renbourn and Maddy Prior.

== Death ==
MacLeod had been ill for some six years prior to his death on 16 November 2020. He had been suffering from tuberculosis, cancer and emphysema. He died after being infected with pneumonia whilst being treated in hospital.
