= Essence to Essence =

Studio album by Donovan
- Released: December 1973
- Recorded: September–October 1973
- Studio: Morgan Studios
- Genre: Folk rock
- Length: 42:21
- Label: Epic
- Producer: Donovan Leitch; Andrew Loog Oldham

Donovan chronology
| Live in Japan: Spring Tour 1973 (1973) | Essence to Essence (1973) | 7-Tease (1974) |

Professional ratings
Review scores
| Source | Rating |
|---|---|
| Allmusic | 3/5 stars |

Essence to Essence is the eleventh studio album, and thirteenth album overall, from Scottish singer-songwriter Donovan. It was released in both the UK (Epic SEPC 69050) and the US (Epic KE 32800) in December 1973.

== History ==
By late 1973, Donovan abandoned the style of glam rock featured on his Cosmic Wheels album earlier that year. Andrew Loog Oldham was brought in (replacing Mickie Most) to co-produce Donovan's next album, which would highlight the subdued style of his previous work. Many of the songs were released on Live in Japan: Spring Tour 1973, but that album was not released outside Japan.

In a clear sign of Donovan's waning popularity, Essence to Essence became the third Donovan album after H.M.S. Donovan and earlier Fairytale to fail to reach the top 25 in the U.S. charts. Essence to Essence missed the UK album charts altogether and peaked at No. 174 in the United States.

On Essence to Essence, Donovan focuses on spirituality and meditative lyrics. The album art features Donovan clothed in white robes, kneeling as in meditation. While the album was derided as a critical failure at the time of its release, many of the songs went on to form a major part of Donovan's live repertoire throughout the 1970s and 1980s.

== Reissues ==
- On 26 January 1998 Epic/Rewind Records released Essence to Essence in the UK (Epic/Rewind 489443 2), marking the first CD release for the album.
- On 23 February 2004 Diablo Records released Cosmic Wheels/Essence to Essence (DIAB8051) in the UK on CD. This compilation includes all of Cosmic Wheels and all of Essence to Essence on one disc.

== Track listing ==
All tracks by Donovan Leitch.

Side one

1. "Operating Manual for Spaceship Earth" – 3:28
2. "Lazy Daze" – 4:43
3. "Life Goes On" – 2:37
4. "There is an Ocean" – 4:49
5. "Dignity of Man" – 5:19

Side two

1. "Yellow Star" – 3:07
2. "Divine Daze of Deathless Delight" – 3:10
3. "Boy for Every Girl" – 4:15
4. "Saint Valentine's Angel" – 3:57
5. "Life is a Merry-Go-Round" – 4:00
6. "Sailing Homeward" – 2:56
- Note: on some album centres "Divine Daze of Deathless Delight" is incorrectly timed as 4:00 and "Life is a Merry-Go-Round" as 3:13.

== Personnel ==
- Donovan – vocals, acoustic guitar
- Henry McCullough, Danny Kortchmar, Doug Schlink, Neil Hubbard, Steve Marriott, Peter Frampton – electric guitar
- Alan Spenner, Carl Radle, Leland Sklar, Paul Ossola – bass guitar
- Danny Thompson – double bass on "There is an Ocean"
- Carole King, Craig Doerge, Jean Roussel – piano
- Nicky Hopkins – piano, Fender Rhodes on "Operating Manual for Spaceship Earth"
- Bobby Whitlock – Hammond organ on "Lazy Daze"
- Bruce Rowland, Denny Seiwell, Jim Gordon, Russ Kunkel – drums
- Ray Cooper – percussion
- Tom Scott – woodwind
- Jack Emblow – accordion
- Chris Nicholls – bass flute
- Simon Jeffes – koto
- The Scratch Band – background vocals
- Andrew Powell, Del Newman, Nicky Harrison – strings
