= Hurdy-gurdy (disambiguation) =

The hurdy-gurdy is a musical instrument.

Hurdy-gurdy may also refer to:

- Hurdy Gurdy (band), a rock band active in the 1960s
- Hurdy Gurdy (film), a 1929 cartoon by Walter Lantz for the Oswald the Lucky Rabbit shorts
- The Hurdy Gurdy, a mid-1760s symphony in E flat written by Joseph Schmitt
- The Hurdy-Gurdy, a 1902 book by Laura E. Richards
- Hurdy-gurdy, a 1905 painting by Pablo Picasso
- The Hurdy-Gurdy, a 1909 book of prose, poetry and drama by Elena Guro
- Hurdy Gurdy, a 1929 film featuring Ann Brody and Max Davidson
- The Hurdy Gurdy, a 1930 play by Andrei Platonov
- Hurdy-Gurdy, a 1944 book of poetry by Nancy Price
- The Hurdy-Gurdy (Φτώχεια και Φιλότιμο), a 1955 film by Alekos Sakellarios
- "Hurdy Gurdy", a track by Malcolm Clarke for the 1979 album BBC Radiophonic Workshop – 21
- Hurdy-gurdy, in Australia (esp. SA) a carousel

== See also ==
- Hurdy Gurdy Man (disambiguation)
- Herdy Gerdy, a 2002 game for the PlayStation 2
