= HMS Donovan (album) =

Studio album by Donovan
- Released: July 1971
- Recorded: June 1968–1971
- Studio: Morgan Studios, London
- Genre: Folk
- Length: 74:10
- Label: Dawn Records
- Producer: Donovan Leitch, Mickie Most

Donovan chronology
Open Road (1970)	HMS Donovan (1971)	Cosmic Wheels (1973)

Singles from HMS Donovan
- 1. "Celia of the Seals" b/w "The Song of the Wandering Aengus" Released: February 1971

HMS Donovan is the ninth studio album, and tenth album overall, from Scottish singer-songwriter Donovan. It marks the second album of Donovan's children's music, after the For Little Ones portion of A Gift from a Flower to a Garden. HMS Donovan is the second double album of Donovan's career, and was released in the UK only, in July 1971 (Dawn Records DNLD 4001 (stereo)).

== Background ==
After the release of the 1970 album Open Road that Donovan recorded with the band of the same name, he and his bandmates embarked on an international tour, partially by boat. Intending to sail around the world for one year, Donovan became homesick and ended the tour early, returning to the UK where he married his longtime affection Linda Lawrence (once girlfriend of Brian Jones) in October 1970. When Linda became pregnant with their first child, Donovan began working to complete a children's album that would eventually contain recordings spanning from June 1968 to 1971.

== Songs and recording ==
Donovan began to conceive of the project as early as 1968, as an acoustic children's album named Moon in Capricorn, to be similar in style to the For Little Ones disc of 1967's A Gift from a Flower to a Garden. A number of songs written or recorded for this project in 1968-9 would eventually make the album, one of the first being "Lord of the Reedy River", recorded with a light jazz backing during the May 1968 Hurdy Gurdy Man sessions and performed by Donovan in the 1969 film If It's Tuesday, This Must Be Belgium. HMS Donovan would feature a re-recorded version of the song with just Donovan and his guitar, similar to the film version. A June 1968 BBC session yielded a medley of "The Unicorn" and his adaptation of Edward Lear's "The Owl and the Pussycat", which share the same melody. The "Unicorn" medley, "Lord of the Reedy River" and his adaptation of Yeats' "The Song of the Wandering Aengus" were performed during shows in the fall 1968 North American tour. During a recording session with Paul McCartney in November, he outlined the start to the album by describing an echoey pump organ and a man shouting in Italian announcing a string of circus acts that would then fade out into "The Walrus and The Carpenter". He also played "The Unicorn" and another new song, "Mr. Wind", for McCartney. A demo of "Mr. Wind" was recorded after the Barabajagal sessions in a lower register and without the voice effects. Another late 1968 BBC session yielded "In an Old Fashioned Picture Book", while "Little Ben" was performed for French television in January 1969. "Voyage of the Moon" was also written at this time and first given to Mary Hopkin, who recorded it along with "Lord of the Reedy River" during the late 1968 sessions for Post Card.

Other tracks recorded for Moon In Capricorn during late 1968 and early 1969 include the title track, "The Ferryman's Daughter", a cover of "She Moved Through the Fair" and "The Traveling People", all of which would see release on the 2005 box set To Try for the Sun: The Journey of Donovan. Eventually, the project was scrapped in favor of releasing a more traditional pop/rock album, Barabajagal, in the summer of 1969. Two additional 1969 outtakes with fuller band backings, "Celia of the Seals" and the album's only electric rock song "Homesickness" (cut with The Jeff Beck Group and the only track produced by Mickie Most), would also find their way onto HMS Donovan.

When the idea for a children's album was resuscitated in late 1970, Donovan also decided to include adaptations of traditional folk songs, hymns, and classic poems for and about children, which he set to original melodies; eventually these would comprise a little more than half of HMS Donovan. Many of the poems were from the book, One Hundred Poems for Children compiled by Herbert Strang. Other poems come from Lewis Carroll's Alice's Adventures in Wonderland and Through the Looking-Glass.

Donovan also penned several more original songs for the double album, many while staying on the isle of Crete and along other parts of the 1970 Open Road tour. The album was entirely produced by Donovan at Morgan Studios, save for "Homesickness", as Donovan and Most stopped working together after the Barabajagal sessions. Other songs backed by drummer John Carr and bassist Mike Thomson were recorded during the early 1970 sessions for Open Road. Danny Thompson is credited with the concert bass fiddle on "Celia of the Seals".

Some of the songs on HMS Donovan share melodies with other songs in Donovan's canon. "Jabberwocky" has an acoustic arrangement with the same melody as "Celtic Rock" from Open Road. Sydney Carter's "Lord of the Dance" borrows the melody from the Joseph Brackett song "Simple Gifts". "The Star" is better known as "Twinkle Twinkle Little Star".

== Album cover art ==
The album's front and back covers featured an elaborate John Patrick Byrne illustration of Donovan resting on the grass, surrounded by various creatures of childhood literature and mythology; an included trifold poster featured a similar Byrne illustration, this time with the artist lying on the grass holding a wand. The inner gatefold consisted of a simpler illustration consisting largely of clouds, with a poem by Donovan on the left side. The overall art direction was credited to Sydney Maurer, who had also been employed for Barabajagal and Open Road.

Professional ratings
Review scores
Source	Rating
Allmusic	4.5/5 stars

== Release and reception ==
Although Donovan had enjoyed consistent top 20 success on both sides of the Atlantic through 1970, Epic Records refused to release HMS Donovan in the US and Donovan's home label Pye Records only put it out on its subsidiary label Dawn Records in July 1971. Despite the inclusion of the minor hit "Celia of the Seals", the double album did not sell as well as his previous releases and failed to appear on the UK charts. This prompted Donovan to reunite with his old producer Mickie Most to try to find a hit-making formula for his next album. The fact that sales were the lowest of Donovan's career at the time eventually led to HMS Donovan becoming the rarest and most sought-after LP of Donovan's catalogue; in the 21st Century a search of eBay revealed that original LP copies of HMS Donovan often trade hands for $100 or more, normally selling for five or ten times the price of any other Donovan LP. Copies that contain the original poster insert are especially collectable.

Writing for AllMusic, Bruce Eder wrote "the album has a decidedly playful tone, even more so than its obvious predecessor, For Little Ones. Lovely as that record was, there are also long stretches of HMS Donovan that have far prettier melodies, arrangements, and accompaniment, played at more attractive tempos."

Not long after the album's release Donovan collaborated with John Patrick Byrne on a 9-minute promo film combining live action and animation featuring the songs "Jabberwocky", the outtake "Winter Has Gone" and "In an Old Fashioned Picture Book". The film was later released on the 2008 DVD documentary Sunshine Superman: The Journey of Donovan.

After this album's release, Donovan became involved in two films. First, he played the lead role in Jacques Demy's The Pied Piper, which was released in the US on 25 May 1972. He also provided the English soundtrack for Franco Zeffirelli's Brother Sun, Sister Moon, which was released in the US on 2 December 1972.

== Reissues ==
In January 1998, Beat Goes On Records reissued HMS Donovan (BGOCD372) on CD in the UK. The label Media Arte issued the album on CD in South Korea in 2009.

In 2020, Donovan's own label Donovan Discs remastered the album and made it available through his website in various forms at https://donovan.ie/. This is the only remastered version of the album made available to fans.

== Legacy ==
Mary Hopkin covered both "Lord of the Reedy River" and "Voyage of the Moon" for her debut album Post Card in 1969. Both Paul McCartney and Donovan are credited with playing guitars on these covers.

In 1981, Kate Bush recorded "Lord of the Reedy River" as the B-side to her 1981 single "Sat in Your Lap". Steven Wilson also covered the song as a standalone single in 2010.

== Track listing ==
Side one

1. "The Walrus and the Carpenter" (words by Lewis Carroll, music by Donovan Leitch) – 8:36
2. "Jabberwocky" (words by Lewis Carroll, music by Donovan) – 2:37
3. "The Seller of Stars" (words by Thora Stowell, music by Donovan) – 2:52
4. "Lost Time" (words by Frida Wolfe, music by Donovan) – 2:29
5. "The Little White Road" (words by Thora Stowell, music by Donovan) – 2:05
6. "The Star" (words by Jane Taylor, music arranged by Donovan) – 1:45

Side two

1. "Coulter's Candy" (traditional, arranged by Donovan) – 1:44
2. "The Road" (words by Lucy Diamond, music by Donovan) – 1:08
3. "Things to Wear" (words by Agnes Grozier Herbertson, music by Donovan) – 1:06
4. "The Owl and the Pussycat" (words by Edward Lear, music by Donovan) – 2:24
5. "Homesickness" (Donovan) – 2:31
6. "Fishes in Love" (Donovan) – 1:04
7. "Mr. Wind" (Donovan) – 2:38
8. "Wynken, Blynken, and Nod" (words by Eugene Field, music by Donovan) – 2:38

Side three

1. "Celia of the Seals" (Donovan) – 3:02
2. "The Pee Song" (Donovan) – 2:06
3. "The Voyage of the Moon" (Donovan) – 5:18
4. "The Unicorn" (Donovan) – 0:55
5. "Lord of the Dance" (Sydney Carter) – 2:31
6. "Little Ben" (Donovan) – 1:44
7. "Can Ye Dance" (Donovan) – 1:32

Side four

1. "In an Old Fashioned Picture Book" (Donovan) – 3:11
2. "The Song of the Wandering Aengus" (words by W. B. Yeats, music by Donovan) – 3:56
3. "A Funny Man" (words by Natalie Joan, music by Donovan) – 1:51
4. "Lord of the Reedy River" (Donovan) – 2:38
5. "Henry Martin" (traditional, arranged by Donovan) – 5:08
6. "Queen Mab" (words by Thomas Hood, music by Donovan) – 2:18
7. "La Moora" (Donovan) – 2:21

== Personnel ==
- Donovan – voice, guitar, harmonica, producer
- Mary – fiddle
- Mike Thomson – bass guitar, Hammond organ
- John Carr – drums
- Danny Thompson – double bass on "Celia of the Seals"
- Cynthia – singing on "Star", "Wynken Blynken and Nod" and "Pee Song"

Technical

- Mike Bobak – engineer
- Mickie Most – co-producer on "Homesickness"
- John Patrick Byrne – paintings
- Sid Maurer – art direction
