= 7-Tease =

Studio album by Donovan
- Released: November 1974
- Recorded: September – October 1974
- Genre: Folk
- Length: 41:48
- Label: Epic
- Producer: Norbert Putnam; Donovan Leitch; Mark Radice

Donovan chronology
Essence to Essence (1973)	7-Tease (1974)	Slow Down World (1976)

Professional ratings
Review scores
Source	Rating
AllMusic	3/5 stars
The Encyclopedia of Popular Music	3/5 stars
The Rolling Stone Album Guide	3/5 stars

7-Tease is an album by the Scottish singer-songwriter Donovan. It was released in the US (Epic PE 33245) in November 1974 and in the UK (Epic SEPC 69104) in January 1975.

The album peaked at No. 135 on the Billboard 200.

== History ==
After the low chart success of Essence to Essence, Donovan entered the studio in late 1974 with a different producer and a new set of songs. The songs were originally intended for use as part of an operetta about the preceding 10 years of Donovan's life and times.

Some of the songs on 7-Tease feature lyrical lines or melodies from earlier Donovan songs. "The Voice of Protest" features a line about a ship going "all on her starry way", in a direct lift from a line in "The Voyage of the Moon" on H.M.S. Donovan. The melody on "How Silly" is nearly identical to "A Funny Man" from H.M.S. Donovan.

== Critical reception ==
AllMusic wrote that "a fair hearing of 7-Tease reveals an album steeped in disillusionment, yet built upon beautiful melodies and some of the most diverse and appealing sounds and arrangements of [Donovan's] career, and a harder rocking sound than he was usually known for."

== Reissues ==
- On 19 April 2004, Diablo Records released 7-Tease/Slow Down World (DIAB8052) in the UK on CD. It includes all of 7-Tease and all of Slow Down World on one disc, and marks the first time all of 7-Tease was released on CD.
- On 22 November 2004, Repertoire Records released 7-Tease in Germany (Repertoire RR2315) on CD. It includes four bonus tracks, including the single versions of "Rock and Roll Souljer" and "Salvation Stomp" and two tracks that were previously released on Troubadour The Definitive Collection 1964–1976 in 1992.

== Track listing ==
All tracks by Donovan Leitch.

=== Original album ===
Side One
No.	Title	Length
1.	"Rock and Roll Souljer"	3:44
2.	"Your Broken Heart"	3:38
3.	"Salvation Stomp"	3:13
4.	"The Ordinary Family"	4:14
5.	"Ride-a-Mile"	4:48
6.	"Sadness"	2:38

Side Two
No.	Title	Length
1.	"Moon Rok"	2:58
2.	"Love of My Life"	4:22
3.	"The Voice of Protest"	3:20
4.	"How Silly"	2:38
5.	"The Great Song of the Sky"	2:45
6.	"The Quest"	3:30

=== 2004 Repertoire Records version ===
No.	Title	Length
1.	"Rock and Roll Souljer"	3:44
2.	"Your Broken Heart"	3:38
3.	"Salvation Stomp"	3:13
4.	"The Ordinary Family"	4:14
5.	"Ride-a-Mile"	4:48
6.	"Sadness"	2:38
7.	"Moon Rok"	2:58
8.	"Love of My Life"	4:22
9.	"The Voice of Protest"	3:20
10.	"How Silly"	2:38
11.	"The Great Song of the Sky"	2:45
12.	"The Quest"	3:30

Bonus Tracks
No.	Title	Length
13.	"Rock and Roll Souljer" (single version)	2:48
14.	"Salvation Stomp" (single version, mono recording)	2:47
15.	"Age of Treason"	4:21
16.	"What the Soul Desires"	2:33

== Personnel ==
- Donovan – vocals, acoustic guitar, bass, harmonica
- Reggie Young – electric guitar
- Teddy Erwin – electric guitar on "Your Broken Heart" and "Moon Rok"
- Johnny Christopher – rhythm guitar
- Norbert Putnam – bass guitar
- David Briggs – keyboards, string arrangement
- Kenneth Buttrey – drums, percussion
- Ben Cauley, Charlie Rose, Harrison Calloway, Harvey Thompson, Ronnie Eades, Bill Puett, George Tidwell, George Bohanon, Johnny Rotella, Tony Terran – horns
- Buffy Sainte-Marie, Byron Warner, Florence Warner, Ginger Holladay, Lea Jane Berinati, Mary Holladay – background vocals
- Sheldon Kurland – concertmaster
- Red Callender – bass guitar on "Salvation Stomp"
- Mike Melvoin – keyboards on "Salvation Stomp"
- Earl Palmer – drums, percussion on "Salvation Stomp"

== Charts ==
Chart (1974)	Peak position
US Billboard Top LPs	135
US Cashbox Top 100 Albums	148
