= Shadows of Blue =

Studio album by Donovan
- Released: 2013
- Recorded: September 2012 & January/February 2013
- Genre: Country, folk
- Label: Treasure Isle Studios
- Producer: Donovan Leitch

Donovan chronology
The Sensual Donovan (2012)	Shadows of Blue (2013)	Eco-Song (2019)

Shadows of Blue is the 26th studio album by Scottish singer songwriter Donovan, released in 2013. It was recorded in Nashville.

== Track listing ==
1. "Blue Jean Angel" – 3:05
2. "Resurrect Your Love" – 4:06
3. "To Love You" – 3:52
4. "River of Ruin" – 3:51
5. "Shadows of Blue" – 3:42
6. "Rock & Roll Gypsy" – 3:16
7. "The Loving of You" – 3:03
8. "The Blame Game" – 4:21
9. "The Harmonica Girl" – 4:22
10. "The Bungalow" – 3:06
