= Neutronica =

Studio album by Donovan
- Released: August 1980
- Recorded: 1980
- Genre: Folk
- Length: 36:04
- Labels: RCA (West Germany); Barclay (France)
- Producers: Donovan Leitch, Peter Walsh

Donovan chronology
Donovan (1977)	Neutronica (1980)	Love Is Only Feeling (1981)

Neutronica is the fifteenth studio album (seventeenth overall) by Scottish singer/songwriter Donovan. It was released in West Germany (RCA PL 28429) in August 1980 and France (Barclay Records BA 253 200149) in 1980.

== Background ==
After Donovan failed to chart in both the UK and US, Donovan once again left his long-time producer Mickie Most. He travelled throughout mainland Europe, bringing attention to world hunger and protesting against nuclear proliferation and weapons development. RCA signed him for a European record distribution deal, beginning with Neutronica, released in 1980. The album did not receive distribution in the US or UK.

Many of the songs Donovan wrote for Neutronica are directly related to his political views. At the time, he was campaigning against what he viewed as disproportionate military spending while famine existed across much of the world. Donovan also recorded "Mee Mee I Love You", a song co-written by his daughter Astrella Leitch, and two war-themed songs, the traditional Crimean War tune "Heights of Alma" and Eric Bogle's World War I ballad "No Man's Land". The arrangements on Neutronica range from synthesizer-based rock songs to acoustic folk songs. Donovan's vocals similarly range from the harder singing style prevalent on Donovan on the rockers, and softer singing on the acoustic numbers.

== Reissues ==
- On 28 August 2001, Pilot Records released Neutronica (Pilot 89) in the UK for the first time on CD with seven bonus tracks. The first two bonus cuts are concert recordings of "The Heights of Alma" and Buffy Sainte-Marie's "Universal Soldier". The next two bonus tracks, "Only to Be Expected" and "Split Wood Not Atoms", were acoustic demo recordings for Neutronica. The fifth and sixth bonus tracks are alternate versions of "Shipwreck" and "Madrigalinda" respectively. The last bonus track, "Fair Ye Well", is an a cappella song.

Professional ratings
Review scores
Source	Rating
Allmusic	(not rated) link

== Track listing ==
All tracks by Donovan Leitch, except where noted.

=== Original album ===
==== Side one ====
1. "Shipwreck" – 3:30
2. "Only to Be Expected" – 3:27
3. "Comin' to You" – 3:30
4. "No Hunger" – 2:44
5. "Neutron" – 2:05
6. "Mee Mee I Love You" (D. Leitch, Astrella Leitch) – 2:45

==== Side two ====
1. "The Heights of Alma" (traditional, arranged by Donovan) – 3:45
2. "No Man's Land" (Eric Bogle) – 5:23
3. "We Are One" – 3:52
4. "Madrigalinda" – 2:47
5. "Harmony" – 2:16

=== 2001 Pilot Records reissue ===
2001 Pilot Records reissue

1. "Shipwreck" – 3:26
2. "Only to Be Expected" – 3:21
3. "Comin' to You" – 3:28
4. "No Hunger" – 2:44
5. "Neutron" – 2:05
6. "Mee Mee I Love You" (D. Leitch, Astrella Leitch) – 2:45
7. "The Heights of Alma" (Traditional, arranged by Donovan) – 3:42
8. "No Man's Land" (Eric Bogle) – 5:20
9. "We Are One" – 3:46
10. "Madrigalinda" – 2:46
11. "Harmony" – 2:16

==== Bonus tracks ====
1. "Heights of Alma" (live) (traditional, arranged by Donovan) – 3:33
2. "Universal Soldier" (live) (Buffy Sainte-Marie) – 2:38
3. "Only to Be Expected" (acoustic) – 2:40
4. "Split Wood Not Atoms" – 2:41
5. "Shipwreck" (alt mix) – 3:45
6. "Madrigalinda" (Alt. Version) – 2:44
7. "Fair Ye Well" (acapella) – 1:50

== Personnel ==
- Donovan – vocals, acoustic guitar
- Ian Bairnson (Miscredited as Ian Berenson) – electric guitar
- John Giblin – bass guitar
- Morris Pert – drums
