= The Sensual Donovan =

Studio album by Donovan
- Released: 2012
- Genre: Jazz rock

Donovan chronology
Ritual Groove (2010)	The Sensual Donovan (2012)	Shadows of Blue (2013)

The Sensual Donovan is an album by Scottish singer songwriter Donovan consisting of lost recordings produced in 1971 by John Phillips of the Mamas and the Papas. His 25th studio album, it is the second 'buried treasure' release by Donovan in a continuing series.

== Track listing ==
All songs written by Donovan Leitch and published by Donovan Music /Peermusic 2012.

1. Only You
2. Amore
3. Two Lovers
4. Astrella
5. Amore (instrumental)
6. Hotel Lonely
7. Two Lovers (instrumental)
8. Open Up Your Heart
9. Astrella (instrumental)
10. Bonus Track: Dignity of Man
