= Love Is Only Feeling =

Studio album by Donovan
- Released: October 1981
- Recorded: 1981
- Studio: Utopia Studios, London
- Genre: Folk
- Length: 39:30
- Label: RCA (West Germany)
- Producer: Donovan Leitch

Donovan chronology
Neutronica (1980)	Love Is Only Feeling (1981)	Lady of the Stars (1984)

Love Is Only Feeling is the sixteenth studio album (eighteenth overall) by Scottish singer/songwriter Donovan. It was released in West Germany (RCA PL 28472) in October 1981, in Italy in January 1982 (Bubble Record, BLU 19610) and belatedly in the UK (RCA PL 28472) in 1983.

== History ==
In 1981, Donovan entered the studio to record the second album of his German RCA contract. The resulting album, Love Is Only Feeling, did not see a US release, but was released in the UK in 1983. The title track is a remake of "Someone's Singing" originally released on A Gift from a Flower to a Garden.

Donovan sang Love Is Only Feeling at Festival di Sanremo 1982 with his daughter Astrella.

Professional ratings
Review scores
Source	Rating
Allmusic	(not rated) link

== Track listing ==
All tracks by Donovan Leitch.

=== Original album ===
==== Side one ====
1. "Lady of the Flowers" – 3:10
2. "Lover O Lover" – 3:53
3. "The Actor" – 4:05
4. "Half Moon Bay" – 3:55
5. "The Hills of Tuscany" – 4:08

==== Side two ====
1. "Lay Down Lassie" – 4:15
2. "She" – 4:01
3. "Johnny Tuff" – 4:58
4. "Love Is Only Feeling" – 3:04
5. "Marjorie Margerine" – 4:01

== Personnel ==
- Donovan – vocals, guitar
- Danny Thompson – double bass
- John Stevens – drums, percussion
- Tony Roberts – clarinet, piccolo flute, oboe, tenor saxophone
- Astrella Leitch – vocals on "Love Is Only Feeling"
