= Donovan (album) =

Studio album by Donovan
- Released: August 1977
- Recorded: 1977
- Genre: Blues rock, folk rock
- Length: 38:01
- Label: Arista (US); Rak Records (UK)
- Producer: Mickie Most

Donovan chronology
Slow Down World (1976)	Donovan (1977)	Neutronica (1980)

Donovan is the 14th studio album, and sixteenth album overall, from Scottish singer-songwriter Donovan. It was released in the US (Arista AB 4143) in August 1977 and in the UK (RAK SRAK 528) with a different track order in October 1977.

== Background ==
In 1976, Donovan's record contract with Epic Records came to an end with Slow Down World. The album had only achieved limited chart success, and his contract was not renewed. Donovan's old record producer Mickie Most had launched Rak Records in the UK in 1969 and Donovan and Most teamed up to record Donovan's next album on Rak Records in 1977. Arista Records picked up the distribution rights in the US.

In a distinct change from Slow Down World, the songs on Donovan were an attempt to reach mass audiences again. The songs feature a contemporary sound and, with the exception of "Maya's Dance", generally avoid the gentle balladry of Donovan's previous work. Despite these measures, Donovan failed to chart in both the US and UK, and signalled the end of Donovan's attempts to reach a mainstream audience. He would not release another original album in the United States until 1984.

== Reissues ==
- On 27 March 2000, Beat Goes On Records released the US version Donovan (BGOCD375) in the UK on CD. This marked the first time the album was released on CD.

== Track listing ==
All tracks by Donovan Leitch.

=== Original album ===
==== Side one ====
1. "Local Boy Chops Wood" – 3:02
2. "Astral Angel" – 4:32
3. "The Light" – 4:09
4. "Dare to Be Different" – 3:50
5. "Brave New World" – 4:48

==== Side two ====
1. "Lady of the Stars" – 3:02
2. "International Man" – 3:59
3. "Sing My Song" – 3:05
4. "Maya's Dance" – 3:38
5. "Kalifornia Kiddies" – 3:46

=== UK version ===
==== Side one ====
1. "Brave New World" – 4:58
2. "Astral Angel" – 4:32
3. "Local Boy Chops Wood" – 3:02
4. "Kalifornia Kiddies" – 3:46
5. "The International Man" – 3:59

==== Side two ====
1. "The Light" – 4:09
2. "Sing My Song" – 3:05
3. "Lady of the Stars" – 3:02
4. "Maya's Dance" – 3:38
5. "Dare to Be Different" – 3:50

== Personnel ==
- Colin Allen – drums
- Chris Blair – mastering
- John Cameron – horn arrangements, string arrangements
- Donovan – guitar, harmonica, vocals
- Isaac Guillory – guitar
- Patrick Halling – violin
- Doug Hopkins – engineer
- Ronnie Leahy – keyboards
- Gered Mankowitz – photography
- Chris Norman – background vocals
- Alan Silson – background vocals
- Nick South – bass
- Tim Summerhayes – engineer
- Wolfgang Thierbach – engineer
- Terry Uttley – background vocals
- Charlie Watts – mastering
