= Open Road (band) =

- Genres: Folk rock, Psychedelic rock, Celtic rock
- Years active: 1970-71
- Label: Epic
- Spinoff of: Donovan
- Past members: Donovan; John Carr; Mike Thomson; Barry Husband; Simon Lanzon

Open Road was a short-lived band originally assembled by Scottish singer-songwriter Donovan for his 1970 album of the same name, with original members Mike Thomson on guitar, bass and vocals and John Carr on drums and vocals. Having previously played solo then with a shifting cast of session musicians, Open Road was Donovan's effort toward writing and recording music as a member of a band.

The band toured with Donovan until the Isle of Wight Festival in 1970, then continued to tour without Donovan, recruiting guitarist Barry Husband and keyboardist Simon Lanzon. With this lineup they recorded the 1971 album Windy Daze and the single "Swamp Fever", before the newer members left in 1971 to form the duo Lanzon and Husband. The remaining duo of Thomson and Carr recorded one more album, which was not released until 2021.

== History ==
=== Formation and Open Road ===
After working with producer Mickie Most on the string of successful albums, Donovan parted ways with Most upon completion of the Barabajagal sessions. He moved back to the UK against the wishes of his management, who objected due to Britain's heavy taxation and its distance from the American market.

For the first two months of 1970, Donovan booked time at London's newly renovated Morgan Studios and began recording and producing the tracks that would form his next album. He made demos of around 20 new songs with just vocals and acoustic guitar, including solo versions of "Changes" and "People Used To", before assembling his new band. Dubbed "Open Road", the band was Donovan's frequent collaborator "Candy" John Carr on drums, and bassist/guitarist Mike Thomson, who'd been a bandmate of Carr's in a group called Dada Lives and briefly in an early version of the band Amber. Donovan also hired engineers Robin Black and Mike Bobak, the latter of whom would work on several of Donovan's following albums.

The sessions marked Donovan's first time playing electric guitar extensively in the studio, and he also took up producing the record himself. The trio were joined on some of the album's songs by former Nero and the Gladiators/Heads Hands & Feet keyboardist Mike O'Neill, who stayed on to play a few gigs with Open Road though was not regarded as a band member.

Donovan's intention was for Open Road to be the band he'd tour with indefinitely, primarily by sea on his own yacht. The plan was to leave Britain for one year, in part to avoid the exorbitant tax that the British government was levying on pop stars. The band met up on the Mediterranean isle of Crete to prepare the ship, rehearse material, and document their time there for the film There is an Ocean, which went unreleased until 2005 when it surfaced as a DVD in the box set Try for the Sun: The Journey of Donovan.

The group ended up flying from Greece to France, to the Soviet Union, and then Japan, never fully embarking on their sea voyage. They also played a concert in Viareggio, Italy that was broadcast on Italian television. Donovan cut the tour short, returning to the UK to focus on his family and record his next album, 1971's H.M.S. Donovan, on which John Carr and Mike Thomson also appeared. The last gig that Donovan did with Open Road was at the third annual Isle of Wight Festival on 30 August 1970.

=== Donovan's departure, recruitment of Lanzon and Husband, Windy Daze ===
After Donovan's departure, Thomson and Carr continued to perform as Open Road, bringing in former Dada Lives bandmate Barry Husband (also known as Younghusband, formerly of Warm Sounds) on guitar and vocals, and church organist Simon Lanzon on keyboards and vocals.

In April 1971 they started work on the album Windy Daze, recorded at Olympic Studios and Morgan Studios and produced by Tony Reeves, and released in 1971 on the short-lived Greenwich Gramophone label. It was followed by a non-album single, "Swamp Fever" b/w "Lost and Found” in February 1972, whose tracks would later be included on CD reissues of the album.

=== Departure of Husband and Lanzon, unreleased third album, and disbanding ===
This second iteration of Open Road embarked on a full tour, during which personal differences emerged, leading Husband and Lanzon to leave the group. Reduced to its the original members of Thomson and Carr, the duo returned to Olympic Studios between March and May 1972 and recorded one more album, produced by Vic Coppersmith-Heaven, before disbanding.

This third Open Road album (the second without Donovan) was assigned a catalogue number by Greenwich Gramophone, but was not released before the company closed in 1972. It was finally released in 2021, as a bonus disc on a CD reissue of Windy Daze under the title The Open Road, based on what was written on the session tape reel boxes.

=== Lanzon and Husband ===
Meanwhile, departing members Simon Lanzon and Barry Husband signed to the Bradleys label as Lanzon and Husband. They recorded their only album, Nostalgia, between September 1972 and October 1974, with Rufus Cartwright producing. It was released on the Bradleys Records label in 1974. Bradleys also released an alternative version of a song from the album, "I'll Be With You Again & Again (Communication Hangup)", backed with "Changes", under the band name Gemini, apparently as a marketing tactic.

Lanzon (as Simon Commonknowledge) would later be associated with anarchist punk band Chumbawamba, appearing as a guest and occasional member on most of their releases from 1985-1995, and also managed Credit to the Nation. He died in 2012.

== Members ==
- Donovan Leitch – guitar, mouth harp, vocals (1970)
- Mike Thomson – bass, 12-string guitar, vocals (1970–1972)
- "Candy" John Carr – drums, percussion, vocals (1970–1972)
- Simon Lanzon – keyboards, piano, accordion, vocals (1971–1972)
- Barry Husband – acoustic and lead guitar, bass, vocals (1971–1972)

with

- Mike O'Neill – keyboards (studio and touring) (1970)

== Discography ==
- Open Road (1970)
- Windy Daze (1971)
- The Open Road (recorded 1972, released 2021)
