= Cosmic Wheels =

Studio album by Donovan
- Released: March 1973
- Recorded: 1972
- Studio: Morgan Studios, London
- Genre: Folk rock; glam rock
- Length: 37:21
- Label: Epic
- Producer: Donovan Leitch; Mickie Most

Donovan chronology
HMS Donovan (1971)	Cosmic Wheels (1973)	Live in Japan: Spring Tour 1973 (1973)

Professional ratings
Review scores
Source	Rating
Allmusic	2/5 stars
Christgau's Record Guide	C−

Cosmic Wheels is the tenth studio album, and eleventh album overall, by Scottish singer-songwriter Donovan. It was released in both the UK (Epic SEPC 65450) and the US (Epic KE 32156) in March 1973.

== History ==
After the introspection of fatherhood and family life contained in the songs of HMS Donovan, Donovan turned his attention to popular music again in 1972. It had been three years since "Atlantis" entered the top 10. Since that time, Donovan had released a mildly successful album with band Open Road and a solo children's album that failed to make the charts in the UK and did not even see a release in the US.

In hopes of fomenting success, Donovan brought in Mickie Most to share the producer duties on his next album. The Cosmic Wheels sessions were recorded in Morgan Studios in London, England. In the UK at that time, glam rock ruled the top of the charts, defined by bands and artists such as T. Rex, Alice Cooper, and David Bowie among others. Several of these bands and artists claimed Donovan as a key influence in their music. This praise coupled with the chart success of the genre likely had great influence on the musical direction Cosmic Wheels would take.

While Donovan was recording Cosmic Wheels, Alice Cooper were recording their 1973 album Billion Dollar Babies in the same studio. Alice Cooper guitarist Michael Bruce suggested asking Donovan to sing co-lead on the title track with Alice Cooper himself. Donovan agreed, and the resulting song helped propel Billion Dollar Babies to No. 1 in the US.

Cosmic Wheels reached the top 20 in both the US and UK, enjoying the same chart success as many of Donovan's previous albums. By 1973 the music business had shifted to promoting album-oriented rock, relegating singles to less promotion and fewer sales. An edited form of "I Like You" reached No. 66 in the U.S. and became the last charting single Donovan has had to date.

== Reissues ==
- On August 15, 1994, Epic's Rewind Records label reissued Cosmic Wheels (Epic/Rewind 477378 2) on CD in the UK.
- On February 23, 2004, Diablo Records released Cosmic Wheels/Essence to Essence (DIAB8051) in the UK on CD. This compilation includes all of Cosmic Wheels and all of Essence to Essence on one disc.
- "Cosmic Wheels" is the third release of THE SEVENTIES COLLECTION as Digital Download on iTunes. The digital release of the original 1973 album "Cosmic Wheels" was on August 19, 2010.

== Track listing ==
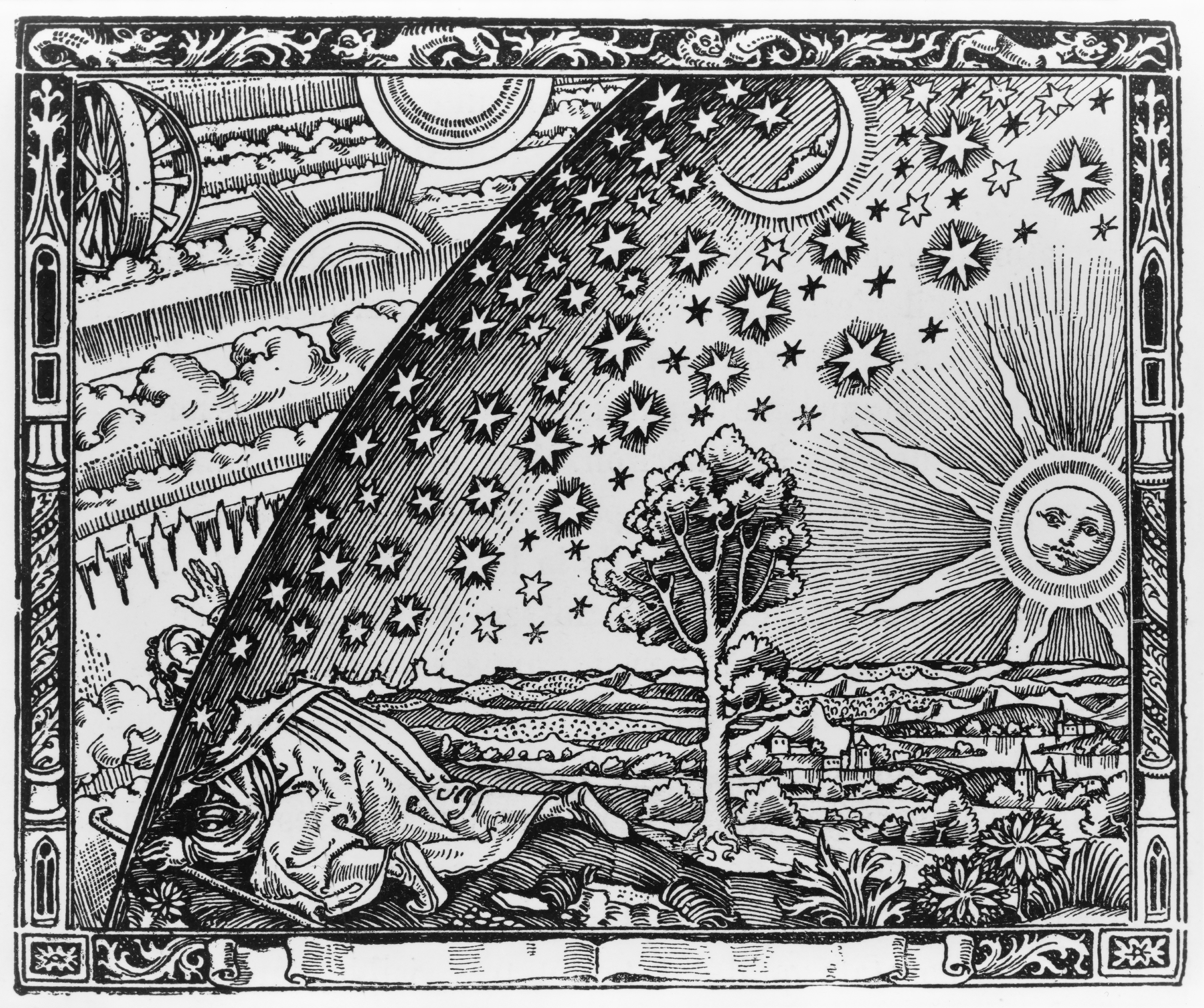
Donovan was inspired by the Flammarion engraving (Paris 1888)

All tracks by Donovan Leitch.
Side one

1. "Cosmic Wheels" – 4:00
2. "Earth Sign Man" – 3:55
3. "Sleep" – 3:45
4. "Maria Magenta" – 2:10
5. "Wild Witch Lady" – 4:20

Side two

1. "The Music Makers" – 4:25
2. "The Intergalactic Laxative" – 2:50
3. "I Like You" – 5:10
4. "Only the Blues" – 3:10
5. "Appearances" – 3:36
- Note: "Sleep" is incorrectly listed as 4:45 on both the album centre label and the album insert. The correct time is 3:45.

== Personnel ==
- Donovan – guitar, harmonica, design, vocals
- Chris Spedding – guitar, strings, bouzouki
- Dennis Ball – bass
- Clive Chaman – bass
- Phil Chen – bass
- Cozy Powell – drums
- Alan White – drums
- John "Rabbit" Bundrick – piano, Moog synthesizer, mellotron
- John Cameron - electric piano on "Appearances"
- Tony Carr – percussion
- Jim Horn – alto saxophone
- Bobby Keys – tenor saxophone
- Patrick Halling – violin
- Jack Emblow – accordion
- Leslye Ash – vocals
- Valerie Charrington – soprano vocals
- Nick Curtis – vocals
- Lesley Duncan – vocals on "The Music Makers"
- Julie Forsythe – vocals
- Leslie Fyson – vocals
- John McCarthy – vocals
- Suzi Quatro – vocals on "The Music Makers"
- Gaynor Stewart – vocals
- Jill Utting – soprano vocals
- Cary Wilson – vocals

Technical

- Mike Bobak – engineer
- John Kosh – design
- Tony Evans – photography
