= Hurdy Gurdy (band) =

Hurdy Gurdy was a band that emerged from the Danish group Peter Belli and the Boom Boom Brothers (aka The B.B. Brothers) in June 1967, when three members of the B.B. Brothers, guitarist Claus Bøhling, drummer Jens Peter Marquard Otzen and British vocalist and bassist Mac MacLeod formed the power trio. Inspired by Cream but with more psychedelic leanings, they split from Peter Belli and MacLeod named the band 'Hurdy Gurdy'. They had considerable success in Scandinavia, breaking many attendance records for their live shows. The band moved to England in early 1968, after MacLeod was deported from Denmark.

From Denmark, MacLeod wrote to Donovan's manager Ashley Kozak on 19 December 1967 to ask if he could help the band in any way. Donovan wrote his song "Hurdy Gurdy Man" for them as a gift for MacLeod. MacLeod came back to the U.K. in the new year to see Donovan and, a few weeks later, the rest of the band followed. After hearing Donovan's demo tape, the band set up outside his Little Berkhamsted cottage and played their version of the song. Donovan did not like the heavy take on the track they played, as he wanted a softer, acoustic arrangement. Soon after, he released his own version of the song which became a hit, his version in the end had a similar arrangement to the Hurdy Gurdy version. Donovan told Keith Altham of the NME (and Hit Parader) in December 1968:

"Hurdy Gurdy Man" was originally written for a Danish group by that name (...) There is a friend of mine in the group – Mac MacLeod – whom I looked to in the early days to learn how to pick the guitar. I wrote the song especially for them but then we got into a disagreement over how it was to be produced. I wanted to do it one way and they another. So I said, "Right then – I'll do it myself because I think it's good enough for a single." So I did it. And it's out.

While they were in the UK, they did some recordings produced by Chris White and Rod Argent of The Zombies. Two tracks by the MacLeod era of Hurdy Gurdy, "Tick Tock Man" and "Neo Camel", are on the Mac MacLeod anthology The Incredible Musical Odyssey of the Original Hurdy Gurdy Man and showcase the free-flowing power trio psychedelic rock sound.

Otzen and Bøhling had to return to Denmark shortly after those recordings, as they were unable to secure work permits from the Musicians' Union. A new bassist (Torben Forne) was recruited to replace MacLeod and, in early 1971, they released a self-titled album for CBS which has recently been reissued on CD. MacLeod briefly joined the post-Zombies group Argent.

In 1993, Bøhling re-formed the band and performed two concerts at the Cavern Club in Exeter.
