= Open Road (Donovan album) =

Studio album by Donovan
- Released: July 1970
- Recorded: January–February 1970
- Studio: Morgan, London
- Genre: Folk rock, Psychedelic rock, Celtic rock
- Length: 42:19
- Label: Epic
- Producer: Donovan Leitch

Donovan chronology
| Barabajagal (1969) | Open Road (1970) | HMS Donovan (1971) |

Open Road chronology
| Open Road (1970) | Windy Daze (1971) |

Open Road is the eighth studio album, and ninth overall, from Scottish singer-songwriter Donovan and the debut album from the short-lived band Open Road. While his previous work was composed by his playing solo on acoustic guitar and then recorded with a shifting cast of session musicians, Open Road was Donovan's effort toward writing and recording music as a member of a band.

== History ==
After working with producer Mickie Most on the string of successful albums, Donovan parted ways with Most upon completion of the Barabajagal sessions. He moved back to the UK against the wishes of his management, who objected due to Britain's heavy taxation and its distance from the American market. For the first two months of 1970, Donovan booked time at London's newly renovated Morgan Studios and began recording and producing the tracks that would form his next album. He made demos of around 20 new songs with just vocals and acoustic guitar, including solo versions of "Changes" and "People Used To", before assembling his new band. Dubbed "Open Road", the band was Donovan's frequent collaborator "Candy" John Carr on drums, and bassist/guitarist Mike Thomson, who'd been a bandmate of Carr's in a group called Dada Lives and briefly in an early version of the band Amber. Donovan also hired engineers Robin Black and Mike Bobak, the latter of whom would work on several of Donovan's following albums. The sessions marked Donovan's first time playing electric guitar extensively in the studio, and he also took up producing the record himself. The trio were joined by former Nero and the Gladiators/Heads Hands & Feet keyboardist Mike O'Neill for some of the album's songs, and O'Neill stayed on to play a few gigs with Open Road, but O'Neill is nonetheless not regarded as a core member of Open Road.

Donovan's intention was for Open Road to be the band he'd tour with indefinitely, primarily by sea on his own yacht. The plan was to leave Britain for one year, in part to avoid the exorbitant tax that the British government was levying on pop stars. The band met up on the Mediterranean isle of Crete to prepare the ship, rehearse material, and document their time there for the film There is an Ocean, which went unreleased until 2005 when it surfaced as a DVD in the box set Try for the Sun: The Journey of Donovan.

The group ended up flying from Greece to France, to the Soviet Union, and then Japan, never fully embarking on their sea voyage. They also played a concert in Viareggio, Italy that was broadcast on Italian television. Donovan cut the tour short, returning to the UK to focus on his family and record his next album, 1971's H.M.S. Donovan, on which John Carr and Mike Thomson also appeared. The last gig that Donovan did with Open Road was at the third annual Isle of Wight Festival on 30 August 1970.

Subsequently, Thomson and Carr continued to perform as Open Road, bringing in former Dada Lives bandmate Barry Husband on guitar and vocals, and church organist Simon Lanzon on keyboards. They recorded and released the 1971 album Windy Daze and non-album single, "Swamp Fever", then a final unreleased album without Husband and Lanzon before splitting up in 1971.

== Songs ==
Many of the songs on Open Road ponder the negative side of industrialization and the lost peacefulness of a previous time. While Donovan had touched on this some of his previous work, Open Road was his first album to expound on the topic at length, though the versions recorded for the album scaled back on some of his more politically charged lyrics. The lyrics printed on the inner gatefold sleeve include some not sung on the actual record, like the first verse of "Celtic Rock":

Ye sons of Britain
Who once were free
Ye now are slaves to factory
Those who walk the path of mole
Expect in time to kill thy soul

While "Celtic Rock" was released as an album single in Japan, its B-side, "Riki Tiki Tavi", appeared as the A-side of Open Road's sole single in all other markets. Backed with "Roots of Oak," (also on the album), the song uses the mongoose from Rudyard Kipling's story in The Jungle Book as a metaphor for how people wait for institutions ("i.e.: the church, i.e.: the government, i.e.: school") to exterminate social ills. An earlier version of the song also preached abstinence from psychedelic drugs, stating, "Laboratory synthetic stimuli, only goes to fog up your third eye." The song, "Poke at the Pope" decries religious faith, particularly Catholicism. "Song for John" was one of Donovan's epistles written for his friends, this one dedicated to fellow songwriter John Sebastian. "New Year's Resovolution" was inspired by Paul McCartney who, fresh from his break with The Beatles, was recording his first solo album in the studio below Donovan, as the two musicians saw themselves transitioning out of the 1960s and heading into new directions with their music. McCartney also loaned Donovan a guitar for some of the recording of Open Road.

In addition to his mix of folk and rock, Donovan and his band explored a number of musical styles on the album. "Riki Tiki Tavi" takes Kipling's Indian setting and riffs it off of a reggae beat. Brazilian guitarist Antonio Carlos Jobim inspired the title of "Joe Bean's Theme", which alternates between a bossa nova rhythm and psychedelic pop melodies. And the album's allegorically fantasy-themed song "Celtic Rock" coined the name of a new musical subgenre.

== Releases and reception ==
Professional ratings
Review scores
| Source | Rating |
|---|---|
| Allmusic | link |

Open Road was released on vinyl LP in North America on Epic in July 1970, and then in the UK on Dawn Records in September. The album's cover features a photo, taken by Donovan's best friend "Gypsy Dave" Mills, of Donovan flanked by his two bandmates with their names typewritten in small print beneath each person. Some versions of the record featured neither Donovan's name nor the album title on the front, highlighting the name "Open Road" on the back, both as the album's title and as the name of the band featured on it. Other versions highlighted either "Donovan" or "Open Road" on the front.

Open Road was Donovan's third-highest charting album in the U.S., reaching No. 17 within two weeks of its release and peaking at No. 16. In Canada the album reached No. 8 and the single "Riki Tiki Tavi" reached No. 35. In the U.K. the album reached No. 30.

In August 2000, the German label Repertoire Records reissued Open Road for the first time on CD.

== Track listing ==
All tracks by Donovan Leitch.

Side One

1. "Changes" – 2:56
2. "Song for John" – 2:43
3. "Curry Land" 4:38
4. "Joe Bean's Theme" – 2:52
5. "People Used To" – 4:09
6. "Celtic Rock" – 3:37

Side two

1. "Riki Tiki Tavi" – 2:55
2. "Clara Clairvoyant" – 2:57
3. "Roots of Oak" – 4:53
4. "Season of Farewell" – 3:25
5. "Poke at the Pope" – 2:47
6. "New Year's Resovolution" – 4:45

Running lengths for some tracks on the iTunes download album differ, mostly due to the removal of seaside sound effects at the end of several tracks.

== Personnel ==
- Donovan Leitch – guitar, mouth harp, vocals
- Mike Thomson – guitar, bass guitar, vocals
- John Carr – drums, vocals

Additional personnel

- Mike O'Neill – piano, vocals
- Robin Black – engineer
- Mike Bobak – engineer

== Tributes ==
- For the 1992 Donovan tribute album Island of Circles, the band When People Were Shorter and Lived Near the Water performed "Riki Tiki Tavi" and Black Sox covered "Changes".
- Celtic folk musician Jack Montgomery recorded a version of "Roots of Oak" with his own lyrics on his 2004 album Everywhere I Look.

== Charts ==
| Chart (1970) | Peak position |
|---|---|
| US Billboard Top LPs | 16 |
| US Cashbox Top 100 Albums | 14 |
| CAN RPM Top 100 Albums | 8 |
| UK OCC Top Albums | 30 |
