= Linda Lawrence =

Wife of folk-rocker Donovan

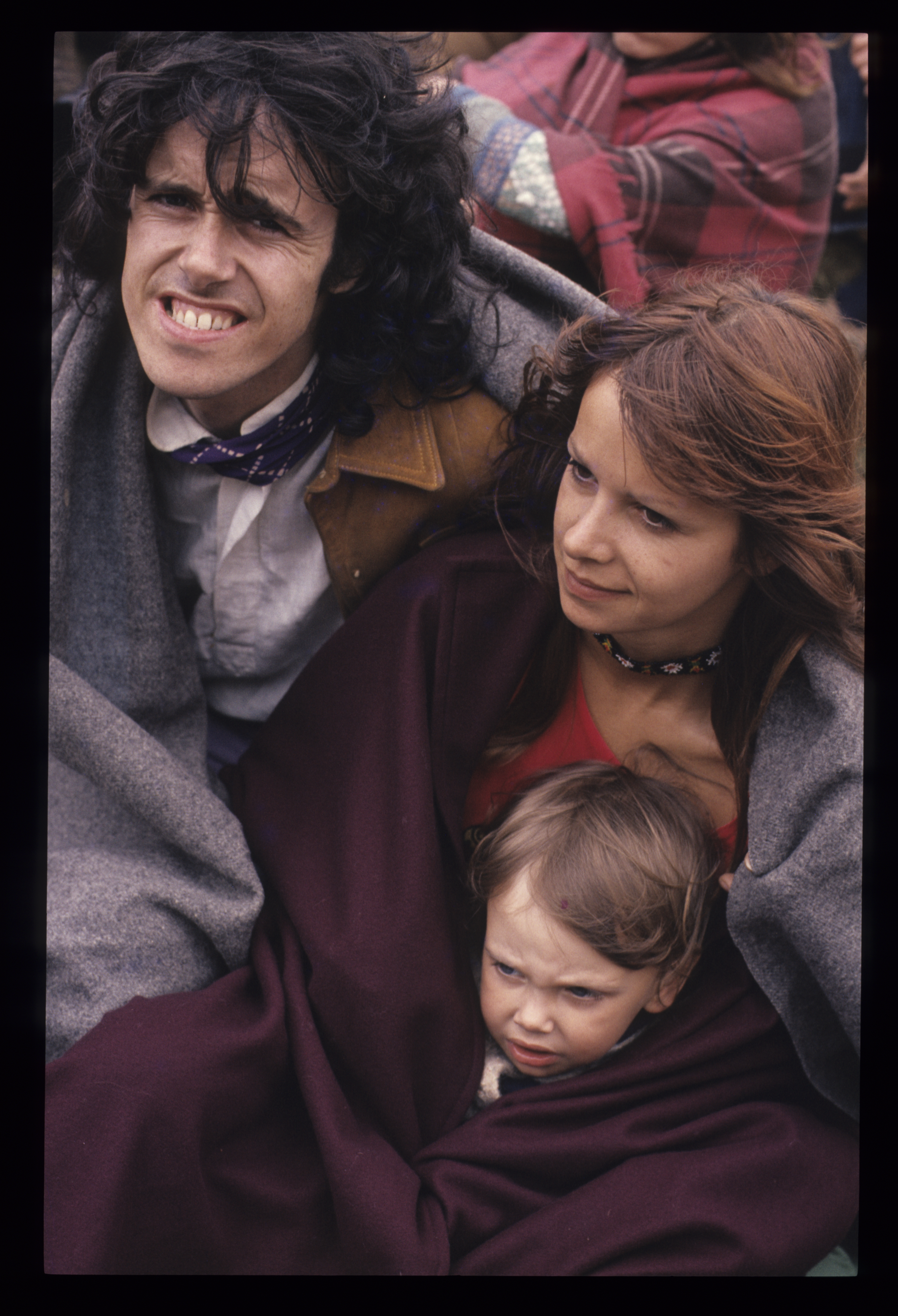
- Linda Lawrence with Donovan and Julian, 1970
- Born: Linda Anne Lawrence; 1947 (age 78–79); Windsor, Berkshire, England
- Notable work: Eco-Song (2019 album)
- Spouse: Donovan Phillips Leitch (m. 1970)
- Partner: Brian Jones (met 1962)
- Children: Julian Brian Lawrence; Astrella Celeste; Oriole Nebula; Donovan Jerome Leitch (stepson); Ione Skye (stepdaughter)
- Parents: Stewart "Alec" Lawrence (father); Violet (mother)
- Relatives: Joolz (grandson); Coco Sian (granddaughter)

Linda Anne Lawrence (also called Linda Leitch; born 1947) is the wife, muse and sometimes collaborator of folk-rock star Donovan (Donovan Phillips Leitch). Donovan wrote his US #1/UK #2 hit song "Sunshine Superman" for her as well as "Legend of a Girl Child Linda". And according to Donovan, "Linda's in all the songs. 'Sunshine Superman,' 'Hampstead Incident,' 'Young Girl Blues'... Linda's the muse."

== Early life ==
I wrote 'Sunshine Superman' knowing she’d hear the lyrics [in LA] and realise I still loved her. I sang: 'It’ll take time, I know it, but in a while / You’re gonna be mine, I know it / We’ll do it in style'.

— Donovan, 2016 Guardian interview

Lawrence's parents were Stewart "Alec" Lawrence, a middle-class contractor, and his wife Violet. She was born Linda Anne Lawrence in 1946 in Windsor, Berkshire.

In January 1963 she began a relationship with musician Brian Jones and had a child by him, Julian Brian Lawrence (born 23 July 1964). Lawrence and Jones broke up, and shortly after she met Donovan in the green room at Ready Steady Go!, he asked Linda to marry him. But, beset by the stresses of teenage motherhood, the rock scene, and her breakup with Jones, Lawrence went to southern California, where she had a brief affair with Gram Parsons. A few years later, back in England, she reconnected with Donovan (who in the meantime had had two children – Donovan Jerome Leitch and Ione Skye – with Enid Karl, and become a major star) and they were married within a few weeks, on 2 October 1970.

== Marriage, family, and career ==
Linda Lawrence and Donovan settled in Ireland and raised her son Julian, who Donovan later adopted and who changed his name to Julian Leitch (he has used Julian Jones as a stage name). Julian's son (Linda's grandson) Joolz is a musician and has toured with Donovan. Lawrence also had two children with Donovan, singer/songwriter and composer Astrella Celeste and Oriole Nebula. Lawrence's granddaughter Coco Sian (daughter of Oriole and Shaun Ryder) is an artist and writer. (Lawrence's stepchildren Donovan Jerome Leitch and Ione Skye were raised in America by their mother.)

Lawrence appeared on the cover of the Radio Times dated 30 September 1967 to publicise the launch of the BBC’s new “pop” channel, Radio 1.

Lawrence has appeared in three documentary films: You Are What You Eat (1968), Let It Bleed: 40 Years of the Rolling Stones (2002), and Sunshine Superman: The Journey of Donovan (2008). She is co-credited on the 2019 album Eco-Song, which is ascribed to "Donovan & Linda" and dedicated to Greta Thunberg, and has on occasion performed on stage with Donovan. She contributed to Brian Jones: Butterfly in the Park, a 2019 book of Michael Cooper's photographs, and was a founding director of Donovan's label, Donovan Discs Limited. Donovan dedicated his 2016 autobiography The Hurdy Gurdy Man "To She..." ("She, my muse and only wife Linda Anne, without whom this book would never have been written").

On 16 October 2020, at Oakley Court, Lawrence publicly unveiled her book Luna Love, an illustrated memoir published in a limited edition of 300 copies.
