= Try for the Sun: The Journey of Donovan =

Compilation album by Donovan
- Released: 13 September 2005
- Recorded: 1964–2005
- Genre: Folk, rock
- Label: Epic (USA); Legacy (USA)
- Producer: Terry Kennedy; Peter Eden; Geoff Stephens; Mickie Most; Donovan; Norbert Putnam

Donovan chronology
Beat Cafe (2004)	Try for the Sun: The Journey of Donovan (2005)

Professional ratings
Review scores
Source	Rating
Allmusic	4.5/5 stars

Try for the Sun: The Journey of Donovan is the second CD boxed set from Scottish singer-songwriter Donovan. It was released on 13 September 2005 (Epic/Legacy E2K 46986).

== History ==
Thirteen years after the release of Troubadour: The Definitive Collection 1964-1976, Donovan released a second CD box set titled Try for the Sun: The Journey of Donovan after one of Donovan's early songs "To Try for the Sun". The box set consists of four discs, three compact discs and one DVD.

The compact discs cover highlights of Donovan's career from his 1964 recording of "Co'dine" (released on Sixty Four in 2004) to a re-recording of "Happiness Runs" from 2005. The DVD contains a 1970 film titled "There Is an Ocean" from Donovan's band Open Road, that had been previously unreleased. In addition to the film, many of the songs from Try for the Sun: The Journey of Donovan were previously unreleased on any Donovan album.

== Track listing ==
All tracks by Donovan Leitch, except where noted.

=== Disc one ===
1. "Catch the Wind" – 2:17
2. "Josie" – 3:27
3. "Codine" (Buffy Sainte-Marie) – 4:47
4. "Colours" – 2:45
5. "Universal Soldier" (Buffy Sainte-Marie) – 2:12
6. "Sunny Goodge Street" – 2:55
7. "Hey Gyp (Dig the Slowness)" – 3:10
8. "Sunshine Superman" – 4:33
9. "The Trip" – 4:34
10. "Legend of a Girl-Child Linda" – 6:53
11. "Three King Fishers" – 3:17
12. "Season of the Witch" – 4:56
13. "Guinevere" – 3:41
14. "The Fat Angel" – 4:12
15. "Mellow Yellow" – 3:43
16. "Sand and Foam" – 3:17
17. "Young Girl Blues" – 3:46
18. "Museum" – 2:56
19. "Hampstead Incident" – 4:42
20. "Sunny South Kensington" – 3:49

=== Disc two ===
1. "Epistle to Dippy" – 3:10
2. "Preachin' Love" – 2:39
3. "There Is a Mountain" – 2:35
4. "Wear Your Love Like Heaven" – 2:25
5. "Oh Gosh" – 1:48
6. "Isle of Islay" – 2:22
7. "Epistle to Derroll" [live] – 5:43
8. "To Try for the Sun" [live] – 3:20
9. "Someone's Singing" [live] – 3:55
10. "The Tinker and the Crab" [live] – 3:06
11. "Jennifer Juniper" – 2:42
12. "Poor Cow" – 2:57
13. "Hurdy Gurdy Man" – 3:20
14. "Get Thy Bearings" – 2:53
15. "Laléna" – 2:56
16. "Barabajagal (Love Is Hot)" – 3:24
17. "Lord of the Reedy River" – 3:04
18. "Moon in Capricorn" – 2:03
19. "To Susan on the West Coast Waiting" – 3:13
20. "Atlantis" – 5:08

=== Disc three ===
1. "Celia of the Seals" – 3:00
2. "The Song of the Wandering Aengus" – 3:55
3. "The Ferryman's Daughter" – 1:49
4. "She Moved Through the Fair" – 2:52
5. "The Traveling People" – 1:50
6. "Riki Tiki Tavi" – 2:55
7. "Clara Clairvoyant" – 2:52
8. "Young But Growing" [live] (traditional; arranged by Donovan Leitch) – 4:33
9. "Keep on Truckin'" [live] (traditional; arranged by Donovan Leitch) – 2:53
10. "Stealin'" [live] – 4:09
11. "I Like You" – 5:17
12. "Maria Magenta" – 2:12
13. "A Working Man" [live] – 3:09
14. "Tinker Tune" [live] – 2:50
15. "Sailing Homeward" – 2:57
16. "Your Broken Heart" – 3:33
17. "Dark-Eyed Blue Jean Angel" – 3:52
18. "Please Don't Bend" – 4:12
19. "Love Floats" – 4:20
20. "Happiness Runs" – 3:43

=== DVD ===
There is an Ocean film – 38:00
