= Hurdy Gurdy Man =

1968 single by Donovan

Single by Donovan

from the album The Hurdy Gurdy Man
- B-side: "Teen Angel"
- Released: May 1968
- Recorded: 3 April 1968
- Studio: CBS, London
- Genre: Psychedelic rock; folk rock; psychedelic folk; acid rock; hard rock
- Length: 3:15
- Label: Pye
- Songwriter: Donovan
- Producer: Mickie Most

Donovan UK singles chronology
"Jennifer Juniper" (1968)	"Hurdy Gurdy Man" (1968)	"Atlantis" (1968)

Donovan US singles chronology
"Jennifer Juniper" (1968)	"Hurdy Gurdy Man" (1968)	"Laléna" (1968)

"Hurdy Gurdy Man" is a song by Scottish singer-songwriter Donovan. It was recorded in April 1968 and released the following month as a single. The song gave its name to the album The Hurdy Gurdy Man, which was released in October of that year in the United States. The single reached number 5 on the Billboard Hot 100 in the U.S. and number 4 on the UK Singles Chart.

Donovan wrote "Hurdy Gurdy Man" while in Rishikesh in India, where he was studying Transcendental Meditation with the Beatles. The recording features a harder rock sound than Donovan's usual material, supplying a range of distorted guitars and aggressive drums. It also features an Indian influence with the use of a tambura, a gift to Donovan from George Harrison, who also helped write the lyrics.

According to some sources, the song was written for the band Hurdy Gurdy (which included Donovan's old friend and guitar mentor Mac MacLeod), with Donovan intending to be the producer, but the collaboration was cancelled due to creative disagreements, leading Donovan to record the song himself. In the chapter dedicated to the song in Donovan's autobiography, he says that he originally wanted it to be recorded by Jimi Hendrix.

== Performers ==
There is some dispute regarding the musicians who performed on the song. In the booklet that came with Donovan's 1992 double CD, Troubadour: The Definitive Collection 1964–1976, Allan Holdsworth and Jimmy Page are listed as the electric guitar players and John Bonham and Clem Cattini (spelled as "Clem Clatini") as drummers on the recording. John Paul Jones, who arranged and played bass on the track (and also booked the session musicians), was reported to have said by email that Clem Cattini played the drums and Alan Parker played the electric guitar. This line-up was confirmed by Cattini. In Donovan's autobiography, he credits Cattini (spelled as "Catini") and Bonham for the drums. In a published interview circa 2013, Donovan is quoted as primarily crediting Cattini for the drums but saying he wasn't sure whether Bonham was also involved, and said he and Jones both credit Holdsworth for the guitar.

On Jimmy Page's website, he lists this song as one on which he plays. Engineer Eddie Kramer also cites Jimmy Page as playing on the track, but says that John Bonham did not. In Hannes Rossacher's 2008 documentary Sunshine Superman: The Journey of Donovan, Donovan said that Page was the guitarist; he also asserted that the song ushered in the Celtic rock sound which would lead to Page, Jones, and Bonham forming Led Zeppelin soon afterwards. In Donovan's autobiography, he credited both Page and Allen Hollsworth [sic] as the "guitar wizards" for the song. However, he also says that "Hollsworth" had played with Blue Mink, which was a band that Alan Parker had played in. In the autobiography, Donovan said that perhaps this session inspired the creation of Led Zeppelin.

The four-string tambura that Donovan plays on the track has been given to him in India by George Harrison, who also helped write the lyrics. In his autobiography, Donovan recalls that he began writing "Hurdy Gurdy Man" on the tambura after Harrison discussed the sitar scales he had learned from Ravi Shankar. Donovan also says that with the drone of the tambura on the song, he had created "Celtic Rock".

The session was produced by Mickie Most and engineered by Eddie Kramer. Donovan had originally hoped Jimi Hendrix would play on the song, but he was unavailable. Donovan said he wanted to give the song to Hendrix for him to record, but that Mickie Most "flipped out" when he heard the song and insisted that Donovan should record it himself as his next single.

== Lyrics and music ==
The lyrics recount the tale of a nameless narrator being visited in his dreams by the "hurdy gurdy man" and his close associate, the "roly poly man", who come "singing songs of love". The song invokes "histories of ages past" with "unenlightened shadows cast" and the "crying of humanity" through "all eternity", and says "'tis then when the hurdy gurdy man comes singing songs of love".

=== Additional verse ===
On his 1990 live album The Classics Live and in his autobiography, Donovan has said that there is also an additional verse that had been written by George Harrison that was not included on the radio single:

When the truth gets buried deep
Beneath the thousand years asleep
Time demands a turnaround
And once again the truth is found

When performing the song in concert, Donovan often relates to his audience the story of how this final verse came about. He played the song for Harrison when they were together in Rishikesh, and Harrison offered to write a verse for the song, which he recorded. Since the running time had to be kept below the three-minute maximum generally allowed for singles at the time, the producer had to choose between the extra verse and the guitar solo, and ended up keeping just the solo.

=== Music ===
Billboard described the song as "a groovy and infectious rhythm item." Cash Box said that the "lyric presents a transcendental love & word play message, but the musical backing has shifted from the small jazz combo style of 'Wear Your Love Like Heaven' and 'Jennifer Juniper' to an easy folk + electric rock & sitar blend." Record World said that "Donovan's reedy voice is absolutely hypnotic on 'Hurdy Gurdy Man', a eerie, magic-like side."

== Sample ==
In the Beastie Boys song "Car Thief", the first drum break is sampled following the lyrics "Space cake cookies I discover who I am / I'm a dusted old bummy Hurdy Gurdy man". Donovan's daughter Ione Skye used to be married to band member Adam Horovitz.

== Soundtrack appearances ==
"Hurdy Gurdy Man" has been used as a framing device or otherwise appeared on the soundtrack or trailer of various films and television shows, including:

- The 1994 film Dumb and Dumber (using a cover version by Butthole Surfers)
- The 1996 Barry Levinson film Sleepers
- The 2001 Michael Cuesta film L.I.E.
- The 2007 David Fincher film Zodiac. The song opens and closes the film. In addition, Ione Skye, the daughter of Donovan, appears in the film.
- The 2012 Fringe episode "Black Blotter" (season 5 episode 9)
- The 2013 horror film The Conjuring
