= Summer Day Reflection Songs =

Compilation album by Donovan
- Released: 25 April 2000
- Recorded: 1965
- Genre: folk
- Label: Castle
- Producer: Terry Kennedy, Peter Eden, Geoff Stephens

Donovan chronology
Forever Gold (2000)	Summer Day Reflection Songs (2000)	Golden Tracks (2000)

Professional ratings
Review scores
Source	Rating
Allmusic	4.5/5 stars

Summer Day Reflection Songs is a compilation album from Scottish singer-songwriter Donovan. It was released on 25 April 2000.

== History ==
In 2000, Castle Records released every song of Donovan's 1965 Pye Records recordings on one collection. Summer Day Reflection Songs features all of the tracks from What's Bin Did and What's Bin Hid and Fairytale, as well as all of Donovan's Pye single recordings, B-sides and EP tracks. Castle also included "Every Man Has His Chain", a song that had only previously appeared as a track on a French EP dating from 1965.

== Track listing ==
All tracks by Donovan Leitch, except where noted.

=== Disc one ===
1. "Catch the Wind" (original single version with strings) – 2:21
2. "Why Do You Treat Me Like You Do" – 2:57
3. "Josie" – 3:29
4. "Catch the Wind" (album version without strings] – 2:57
5. "Remember the Alamo" (Jane Bowers) – 3:06
6. "Cuttin' Out" – 2:21
7. "Car Car" (Woody Guthrie) – 1:33
8. "Keep On Truckin'" (traditional; arranged by Donovan Leitch) – 1:52
9. "Goldwatch Blues" (Mick Softley) – 2:34
10. "To Sing for You" – 2:46
11. "You're Gonna Need Somebody on Your Bond" (traditional; arranged by Donovan Leitch) – 4:05
12. "Tangerine Puppet" – 1:53
13. "Donna Donna" (Aaron Zeitlin, Sholom Secunda, Arthur S Kevess, Teddi Schwartz) – 2:58
14. "Ramblin' Boy" – 2:36
15. "Every Man Has His Chain" – 2:14
16. "Colours" (original single version) – 2:44

=== Disc two ===
1. "Universal Soldier" (Buffy Sainte-Marie) – 2:16
2. "The Ballad of a Crystal Man" – 3:19
3. "The War Drags On" (Mick Softley) – 3:44
4. "Do You Hear Me Now" (Bert Jansch) – 1:51
5. "Colours" (album version without harmonica) – 2:47
6. "To Try for the Sun" – 3:41
7. "Sunny Goodge Street" – 2:58
8. "Oh Deed I Do" (Bert Jansch) – 2:10
9. "Circus of Sour" (Paul Bernath) – 1:54
10. "Summer Day Reflection Song" – 2:10
11. "Candy Man" (traditional; arranged by Donovan Leitch) – 3:30
12. "Jersey Thursday" – 2:17
13. "Belated Forgiveness Plea" – 2:59
14. "The Ballad of a Crystal Man" (alternative version) – 3:54
15. "The Little Tin Soldier" (Shawn Phillips) – 3:03
16. "Ballad of Geraldine" – 4:43
17. "Turquoise" – 3:32
18. "Hey Gyp (Dig the Slowness)" – 3:09
