= The Real Donovan =

Compilation album by Donovan
- Released: September 1966
- Recorded: 1965
- Genre: folk
- Label: Hickory
- Producer: Terry Kennedy, Peter Eden, Geoff Stephens

Donovan chronology
Fairytale (1965)	The Real Donovan (1966)	Sunshine Superman (1966)

Professional ratings
Review scores
Source	Rating
Allmusic	2/5 stars

The Real Donovan is the first compilation album from Scottish singer-songwriter Donovan. It was released in the US (Hickory LPM 135 (monaural) /LPS 135 (stereo)) in September 1966.

== History ==
When Donovan signed a contract with Epic Records, he became entangled in a legal dispute with Pye Records over the rights to his music. These legal proceedings withheld any new Donovan releases in the United Kingdom until late 1966. In the meantime, Pye Records' United States distributor Hickory Records compiled The Real Donovan from Donovan's Pye Records releases, choosing several songs that had not yet appeared on any United States release.

The Real Donovan was released within the same month as Donovan's first Epic Records album Sunshine Superman. Both albums were intended to capitalize on the success of the "Sunshine Superman" single, which hit No. 1 on the Billboard charts in the United States. While it did not match the Billboard chart success and sales of Sunshine Superman, The Real Donovan did chart, ultimately reaching No. 96.

== Album origins of tracks ==
The following is a list explaining the original releases of each song. Tracks that were previously unreleased in the United States are noted with *, followed by explanations of their origin.

- "Turquoise" (UK single, released 30 October 1965; Released in U.S. as b-side to "To Try for the Sun" in January 1966)
- "Oh Deed I Do"* (from UK version of Fairytale, released 22 October 1965)
- "Catch the Wind" (from What's Bin Did and What's Bin Hid, released 14 May 1965)
- "Remember the Alamo" (from What's Bin Did and What's Bin Hid, released 14 May 1965)
- "Ballad of a Crystal Man"* (from The Universal Soldier EP, released 15 August 1965)
- "Colours" (from Fairytale, released 22 October 1965)
- "Hey Gyp (Dig the Slowness)"* (b-side of "Turquoise", released 30 October 1965)
- "Belated Forgiveness Plea" (from Fairytale, released 22 October 1965)
- "Ramblin' Boy" (from What's Bin Did and What's Bin Hid, released 14 May 1965)
- "The War Drags On"* (from The Universal Soldier EP, released 15 August 1965)
- "Josie" (from What's Bin Did and What's Bin Hid, released 14 May 1965)
- "To Try for the Sun" (from Fairytale, released 22 October 1965)

== Track listing ==
All tracks by Donovan Leitch, except where noted.

=== Side one ===
1. "Turquoise"
2. "Oh Deed I Do" (Bert Jansch)
3. "Catch the Wind"
4. "Remember the Alamo" (Jane Bowers)
5. "Ballad of a Crystal Man"
6. "Colours"

=== Side two ===
1. "Hey Gyp (Dig the Slowness)"
2. "Belated Forgiveness Plea"
3. "Rambin' Boy"
4. "The War Drags On" (Mick Softley)
5. "Josie"
6. "To Try for the Sun"

== Charts ==
Chart (1966)	Peak position
US Billboard Top LPs	96
US Cashbox Top 100 Albums	79
