= Storyteller (Donovan album) =

Compilation album by Donovan
- Released: 16 September 2003
- Recorded: 1965–1969
- Genre: folk, rock
- Label: Audio Fidelity
- Producer: Terry Kennedy, Peter Eden, Geoff Stephens, Mickie Most

Donovan chronology
Atlantis (2002)	Storyteller (2003)	Catch the Wind (2003)

33 1/3 rpm vinyl record
- MsMusic Productions

Storyteller is a compilation album from Scottish singer-songwriter Donovan. It was released on 16 September 2003 (Audio Fidelity 015) and was the first Donovan album released as a Super Audio CD/CD hybrid. It was rated 3.5 stars by AllMusic.

== History ==
In 2003, Audio Fidelity issued a compilation consisting chiefly of Donovan's 1965 Pye Records recordings, but also secured the right to add his Epic Records recordings of "Sunshine Superman", "Mellow Yellow", "Hurdy Gurdy Man" and "Atlantis". All of the songs were remastered for both the CD and Super Audio CD layers by Steve Hoffman. In 2006, MsMusic Productions reissued this album on 33 1/3 rpm vinyl record with a few additional tracks from the Pye Records years, the 4 Epic Records tracks on a bonus 45 rpm EP and different artwork as pictured on the right, below.

== Track listing ==
All tracks by Donovan Leitch, except where noted.

=== CD/SACD version ===
1. "Catch the Wind"
2. "Colours"
3. "Universal Soldier" (Buffy Sainte-Marie)
4. "Josie"
5. "Sunny Goodge Street"
6. "Hey Gyp (Dig the Slowness)"
7. "Turquoise"
8. "You're Gonna Need Somebody on Your Bond" (traditional; arranged by Donovan Leitch)
9. "To Try for the Sun"
10. "To Sing for You"
11. "Sunshine Superman"
12. "Mellow Yellow"
13. "Hurdy Gurdy Man"
14. "Atlantis"

=== Vinyl version on MsMusic Productions ===
Side One

1. Catch the Wind
2. Colours (hit version)
3. Universal Soldier
4. Josie
5. Sunny Goodge Street
6. Turquoise

Side Two

1. Hey Gyp (Dig the Slowness)
2. You're Gonna Need Somebody on Your Bond
3. To Try for the Sun
4. To Sing for You
5. Jersey Thursday
6. Colours (album version)

=== Bonus 45rpm that comes with vinyl version ===
Side 1:

1. Sunshine Superman
2. Mellow Yellow

Side 2:

1. Hurdy Gurdy Man
2. Atlantis
