= Mellow (Donovan album) =

Compilation album by Donovan
- Released: 1 November 1997
- Recorded: 1965
- Genre: Folk
- Label: Recall Records
- Producer: Terry Kennedy, Peter Eden, Geoff Stephens

Donovan chronology
Greatest Hits: Acoustic Live (1997)	Mellow (1997)	Love Is Hot, Truth Is Molten (1998)

Mellow is a 2CD compilation album by Scottish singer-songwriter Donovan, released on 1 November 1997 (Recall 158).

== History ==
In 1997, Recall Records reissued a large portion of Donovan's 1965 Pye Records catalogue with Mellow. It excluded several songs from those recordings, however, including "Turquoise" and "Hey Gyp (Dig the Slowness)".

Professional ratings
Review scores
Source	Rating
Allmusic	3.5/5 stars

== Track listing ==
All tracks by Donovan Leitch, except where noted.

=== Disc one ===
1. "Colours" – 2:47
2. "To Try for the Sun" – 3:39
3. "Sunny Goodge Street" – 2:58
4. "Oh Deed I Do" (Bert Jansch) – 2:10
5. "Circus of Sour" (Paul Bernath) – 1:53
6. "Summer Day Reflection Song" – 2:13
7. "Candy Man" (Traditional; arranged by Donovan) – 3:28
8. "Jersey Thursday" – 2:15
9. "Belated Forgiveness Plea" – 2:57
10. "Ballad of a Crystal Man" – 3:54
11. "The Little Tin Soldier" (Shawn Phillips) – 3:05
12. "Ballad of Geraldine" – 4:41
13. "Universal Soldier" (Buffy Sainte-Marie) – 2:14
14. "Do You Hear Me Now" (Jansch) – 1:49
15. "The War Drags On" (Mick Softley) – 3:43

=== Disc two ===
1. "Josie" – 3:29
2. "Catch the Wind" – 2:57
3. "Remember the Alamo" (Jane Bowers) – 3:05
4. "Cuttin' Out" – 2:20
5. "Car Car" (Woody Guthrie) – 1:32
6. "Keep On Truckin'" (Traditional; arranged by Donovan) – 1:51
7. "Gold Watch Blues" (Softley) – 2:33
8. "To Sing for You" – 2:44
9. "You're Gonna Need Somebody on Your Bond" (Traditional; arranged by Donovan) – 4:04
10. "Tangerine Puppet" – 1:52
11. "Donna Donna" (Aaron Zeitlin, Sholom Secunda, Arthur S. Kevess, Teddi Schwartz) – 2:57
12. "Ramblin' Boy" – 2:34
13. "Catch the Wind" – 2:19
14. "Why Do You Treat Me Like You Do?" – 2:56
