= Like It Is, Was, and Evermore Shall Be =

Compilation album by Donovan
- Released: April 1968
- Recorded: 1965
- Genre: Folk
- Label: Hickory
- Producers: Terry Kennedy, Peter Eden, Geoff Stephens

Donovan chronology
For Little Ones (1967)	Like It Is, Was, and Evermore Shall Be (1968)	Donovan in Concert (1968)

Professional ratings
Review scores
Source	Rating
Allmusic	link

Like It Is, Was, and Evermore Shall Be is a compilation album from Scottish singer-songwriter Donovan. It was released in the US (Hickory LPM 143 (mono) /LPS 143 (stereo)) in April 1968. Like It Is, Was, and Evermore Shall Be marked the second Hickory Records compilation of Donovan's 1965 Pye Records material in the United States, following the moderately successful The Real Donovan from 1966.

== History ==
By 1968, Donovan had released a string of hit singles and albums in both the United States and United Kingdom. With his popularity reaching its zenith, Hickory Records compiled and released Like It Is, Was, and Evermore Shall Be from his 1965 Pye Records catalog.

Although Donovan's Pye recordings bore little resemblance to his subsequent material, Hickory released the album with brightly colorful artwork reminiscent of Donovan's latest albums for Epic Records. The back cover contained a pair of reprinted fan letters; one a testimonial from a young female fan, the other thanks from a middle-aged businessman for the way one of Donovan's songs had caused him to reconsider life. (The song unfortunately was not named.)

While most of the songs on Like It Is, Was, and Evermore Shall Be had been released on What's Bin Did and What's Bin Hid (US-title: Catch the Wind), Fairytale, and The Real Donovan, the new compilation did contain "Why Do You Treat Me Like You Do" and Donovan's recording of Bert Jansch's "Do You Hear Me Now?", neither of which had been included on any of Donovan's US long players. The album charted for 4 weeks, reaching No. 177 on the Billboard Top LPs chart in the United States.

== Album origins of tracks ==
The following is a list explaining the original releases of each song.

- "Summer Day Reflection Song" (from Fairytale, released 22 October 1965)
- "Do You Hear Me Now?" (from The Universal Soldier EP, released 15 August 1965)
- "Colours" (from Fairytale)
- "Universal Soldier" (from Universal Soldier EP, released 15 August 1965)
- "Josie" (from What's Bin Did and What's Bin Hid, released 14 May 1965)
- "Catch the Wind" (from What's Bin Did and What's Bin Hid)
- "Why Do You Treat Me Like You Do?" (b-side of "Catch the Wind", released 12 March 1965)
- "To Try for the Sun" (from Fairytale)
- "Hey Gyp (Dig the Slowness)"* (b-side of "Turquoise", released 30 October 1965)
- "The War Drags On" (from The Universal Soldier EP)
- "Sunny Goodge Street" (from Fairytale)

== Track listing ==
All tracks by Donovan Leitch, except where noted.

=== Side one ===
1. "Summer Day Reflection Song" – 2:11
2. "Do You Hear Me Now?" (Bert Jansch) – 1:45
3. "Colours" – 2:44
4. "Universal Soldier" (Buffy Sainte-Marie) – 2:13
5. "Josie" – 3:24
6. "Catch the Wind" – 2:53

=== Side two ===
1. "Why Do You Treat Me Like You Do?" – 2:54
2. "To Try for the Sun" – 3:37
3. "Hey Gyp (Dig the Slowness)" – 3:05
4. "The War Drags On" (Mick Softley) – 3:40
5. "Sunny Goodge Street" – 2:55

== Charts ==
Chart (1968)	Peak position
US Billboard Top LPs	177
