= Wonderful Music of Donovan =

Compilation album by Donovan
- Released: 1993
- Recorded: 1965, 1983
- Genre: folk, rock
- Label: Remember Records (1993), Wonderful Music of (1996)
- Producer: Terry Kennedy, Peter Eden, Geoff Stephens, Donovan Leitch

Professional ratings
Review scores
Source	Rating
Allmusic	1.5/5 stars

Wonderful Music of Donovan is a compilation album from Scottish singer-songwriter Donovan. It was released by Remember Records (1993) and in Portugal (WMO 90323) in 1996.

== History ==
In 1993, budget label Remember Records issued a compilation of Donovan's 1965 Pye Records recordings and selections from his 1984 album Lady of the Stars. Three years later, Portuguese label Wonderful Music of issued exactly the same compilation as Wonderful Music of Donovan but cut the last two tracks ("Boy for Every Girl" and "Till I See You Again").

== Track listing ==
All tracks by Donovan Leitch, except where noted.

1. "Catch the Wind" – 3:01
2. "Colours" – 3:04
3. "Sunshine Superman" – 4:04
4. "Turquoise" – 3:39
5. "Oh Deed I Do" (Bert Jansch) – 2:16
6. "Belated Forgiveness Plea" – 2:59
7. "Remember the Alamo" (Jane Bowers) – 3:12
8. "The War Drags on" (Mick Softley) – 3:42
9. "Ramblin' Boy" – 2:35
10. "To Try for the Sun" – 3:46
11. "The Ballad of a Crystal Man" – 3:18
12. "Hey Gyp (Dig the Slowness)" – 3:10
13. "Lady of the Stars" – 4:42
14. "Season of the Witch" – 5:22
15. "Living for the Love Light" – 3:44
16. "Every Reason" – 3:03
