= Early Treasures =

Compilation album by Donovan
- Released: 1973
- Recorded: 1965
- Genre: folk
- Label: Bell
- Producer: Terry Kennedy, Peter Eden, Geoff Stephens

Donovan chronology
Colours (1972)	Early Treasures (1973)	Cosmic Wheels (1973)

Early Treasures is a compilation album from Scottish singer-songwriter Donovan. It primarily features songs from the albums Catch the Wind and Fairytale. It was released in the United States (Bell 1135) in 1973.

== History ==
By 1973, Bell Records acquired the rights to release Donovan's Pye Records catalog in the United States. These rights originally belonged to Hickory Records and later to Janus Records, the latter issuing Donovan P. Leitch in 1970 and Hear Me Now in 1971.

Bell Records assembled Donovan's best known songs from the 1965 recordings and released it as Early Treasures in 1973. The album cover featured Donovan in a white robe reminiscent of his Essence to Essence album from the same year. This, like the album covers of Like It Is, Was, and Evermore Shall Be and The Best of Donovan, linked Donovan's current image with an album of his early folk songs.

== Track listing ==
All tracks by Donovan Leitch, except where noted.

=== Side one ===
1. "Catch the Wind" – 2:18
2. "Colours" – 2:47
3. "Sunny Goodge Street" – 2:54
4. "Ballad of a Crystal Man" – 3:17
5. "Jersey Thursday" – 2:15
6. "Candy Man" – 3:27

=== Side two ===
1. "Hey Gyp (Dig the Slowness)" – 3:14
2. "Universal Soldier" (Buffy Sainte-Marie) – 2:11
3. "The Summer Day Reflection Song" – 2:14
4. "Turquoise" – 3:32
5. "To Try for the Sun" – 3:41

== Personnel ==
- Donovan – guitar, harmonica, vocals
