= Universal Soldier (1967 Donovan album) =

Compilation album by Donovan
- Released: September 1967
- Recorded: 1965
- Genre: folk
- Label: Marble Arch
- Producers: Terry Kennedy, Peter Eden, Geoff Stephens

Donovan chronology
Sunshine Superman (1967)	Universal Soldier (1967)	A Gift from a Flower to a Garden (1967)

Professional ratings
Review scores
Source	Rating
Allmusic	3/5 stars

Universal Soldier is the second compilation album from Scottish singer-songwriter Donovan. It was released in the UK (Marble Arch LP-MAL 718) in September 1967.

== History ==
In the mid-1960s Pye Records launched budget record label Marble Arch Records to release older material on inexpensive albums in the United Kingdom. Several of Donovan's 1965 recordings for Pye were selected for release in 1967 as Universal Soldier. Donovan's version of "Universal Soldier" was a hit EP in 1965, and that name recognition was intended to boost sales.

Universal Soldier was a unique release because it collected the entire Universal Soldier EP, the b-side to "Catch the Wind", and the entire "Turquoise" single; all of which had not appeared before on LP format in the United Kingdom. The strategy of compiling non-album tracks paid off, and Universal Soldier reached No. 5 in the United Kingdom and remained on the charts for 18 weeks.

Marble Arch would go on to release several more Donovan compilations to significantly less interest, including an edited What's Bin Did and What's Bin Hid in 1968 and an edited Fairytale in 1969.

In 1995, Spectrum Music released a CD compilation, also named after the title track.

== Track listing ==
All tracks by Donovan Leitch, except where noted.

Side 1
No.	Title	Original release	Length
1.	"Universal Soldier" (Buffy Sainte-Marie)	Universal Soldier EP	2:15
2.	"To Sing for You"	What's Bin Did and What's Bin Hid	2:45
3.	"Why Do You Treat Me Like You Do?"	B-side of "Catch the Wind" single	2:56
4.	"Turquoise"	Non-album single	3:31
5.	"Colours (Single Mix)"	Fairytale	2:11

Side 2
No.	Title	Original release	Length
6.	"Catch the Wind (Single Mix)"	What's Bin Did and What's Bin Hid	2:56
7.	"Hey Gyp (Dig the Slowness)"	B-side of "Turquoise" single	3:08
8.	"The Ballad of a Crystal Man"	The Universal Soldier EP	3:19
9.	"Do You Hear Me Now?" (Bert Jansch)	Universal Soldier EP	1:50
10.	"The War Drags On" (Mick Softley)	Universal Soldier EP	3:44

== Charts ==
Weekly chart performance
Chart (1967–1968)	Peak position
UK Melody Maker Top Ten LPs	4
UK New Musical Express Top 15 LPs	7
UK Record Retailer LPs Chart	5
