= Love Is Hot, Truth Is Molten =

Compilation album by Donovan
- Released: 7 April 1998
- Recorded: 1965–1973
- Genre: folk, rock
- Length: 77:34
- Label: Raven
- Producer: Terry Kennedy, Peter Eden, Geoff Stephens, Mickie Most

Donovan chronology
Mellow (1997)	Love Is Hot, Truth Is Molten (1998)	The Very Best of Donovan (1998)

Professional ratings
Review scores
Source	Rating
Allmusic	4.5/5 stars

Love Is Hot, Truth Is Molten is a compilation album from Scottish singer-songwriter Donovan. It was released in Australia on 7 April 1998 (Raven Records 68).

== History ==
In 1998, Raven Records issued a comprehensive overview of Donovan's 1960s material as Love Is Hot, Truth Is Molten. The album featured many of the songs in true stereo, unique to any Donovan compact disc release up until that time.

== Track listing ==
All tracks by Donovan Leitch, except where noted.

1. "Catch the Wind" – 2:54
2. "Colours" – 2:43
3. "Universal Soldier" (Buffy Sainte-Marie) – 2:12
4. "Hey Gyp (Dig the Slowness)" – 3:11
5. "Josie" – 3:24
6. "Season of the Witch" – 5:00
7. "Celeste" – 4:09
8. "Sunshine Superman" – 4:33
9. "The Trip" – 4:34
10. "Mellow Yellow" – 3:41
11. "Superlungs" – 3:15
12. "Epistle to Dippy" – 3:09
13. "There Is a Mountain" – 2:34
14. "Wear Your Love Like Heaven" – 2:24
15. "Jennifer Juniper" – 2:42
16. "Poor Cow" – 2:56
17. "Hurdy Gurdy Man" – 3:15
18. "Laléna" – 2:59
19. "Atlantis" – 5:01
20. "Goo Goo Barabajagal (Love Is Hot)" – 3:18
21. "To Susan on the West Coast Waiting" – 3:11
22. "Celia of the Seals" – 3:00
23. "Cosmic Wheels" – 4:02
