= The Best of Donovan (1969 album) =

Greatest hits album by Donovan
- Released: November 1969
- Recorded: 1965
- Genre: folk
- Label: Hickory
- Producer: Terry Kennedy, Peter Eden, Geoff Stephens

Donovan chronology
Barabajagal (1969)	The Best of Donovan (1969)	Open Road (1970)

Professional ratings
Review scores
Source	Rating
Allmusic	2/5 stars

The Best of Donovan is a compilation album from Scottish singer-songwriter Donovan. It was released in the US (Hickory LPS 149) in November 1969. The Best of Donovan marked the third Hickory Records compilation of Donovan's 1965 Pye Records material in the United States, following the Like It Is, Was, and Evermore Shall Be from 1968.

== History ==
Strong sales of Donovan's material continued throughout the late 1960s, prompting many fans to desire a greatest hits compilation of the most popular hits. Donovan and Epic Records responded by releasing Donovan's Greatest Hits in January 1969, which went on to become Donovan's highest selling album, reaching No. 4 on the U.S. Billboard charts.

In response to the success of Donovan's Greatest Hits, Hickory Records assembled another compilation of Donovan's 1965 Pye Records recordings and titled it The Best of Donovan. Like Like It Is, Was, and Evermore Shall Be, this compilation was released with psychedelic cover art that fit in with Donovan's late 1960s image rather than his 1965 image as a folk singer. Hickory's marketing strategy worked to a degree, as The Best of Donovan charted at No. 144 in the United States.

Though the collection presents some material (including "Jersey Thursday") in stereo for the first time, a technical flaw was also present. The pitch on several tracks appears to 'wind up to speed', because of the way the transfer machine handled the source tape's banding.

== Track listing ==
All tracks by Donovan Leitch, except where noted.

=== Side one ===
1. "Universal Soldier" (Buffy Sainte-Marie) – 2:13
2. "Colours" – 2:44
3. "Catch the Wind" – 2:53
4. "Hey Gyp (Dig the Slowness)" – 3:05
5. "Little Tin Soldier" (Shawn Phillips) – 2:58

=== Side two ===
1. "Tangerine Puppet" – 1:50
2. "Donna Donna" (Aaron Zeitlin, Sholom Secunda, Arthur S Kevess, Teddi Schwartz) – 2:55
3. "Candy Man" (traditional; arranged by Donovan Leitch) – 3:25
4. "Jersey Thursday" – 2:11
5. "Ballad of Geraldine" – 4:35

== Charts ==
Chart (1969)	Peak position
US Billboard Top LPs	144
