= Animal Kwackers =

British TV childrem's series (1975–1978)

The Animal Kwackers: (from left to right) Rory, Twang, Bongo, and Boots

Animal Kwackers is a British children's television series produced by Yorkshire Television and broadcast on ITV from 1975 to 1978.

The Animal Kwackers were a four-piece pop band consisting of Rory, a blue lion; Twang, a monkey; Bongo, a bloodhound with buck tooth; and Boots, a tiger. The characters were played by actors in costumes. The show was similar in many ways to the successful US series The Banana Splits and The Skatebirds.

The music was a mixture of well-known pop songs and original songs, most of which (including the theme song) were written by Roy Apps (of Heron) and the producer Peter Eden.

The jingle from the series was "Rory Rory tell us a story, Rory Rory tell it like it is!"

== Cast for series 1 and 2 ==
Nick Pallet and Geoff Nicholls from the band Principal Edwards played Twang and Bongo on series 1 of Animal Kwackers, with Tony Hannaford from G.T. Moore and the Reggae Guitars as Boots and Roy Apps as Rory. In 1980, Pallet, Nicholls and Tony Hannaford would be signed to the EMI label Cobra in the band Electrotunes (known for the single "If This Ain't Love"). In series 2, Peter Eden replaced Nicholls as Bongo.

- Rory, on guitar – Roy Apps
- Twang, on Bass – Nick Pallett
- Bongo, on drums – Geoff Nicholls and (2nd series) Peter Eden
- Boots, on guitar – Tony Hannaford

== Cast for series 3 ==
- Rory, on guitar – Bev Doyle
- Twang, on bass – Step Morley
- Bongo, on drums – Atalanta Harmsworth
- Boots, on guitar – John Basset

== Transmission guide ==
- Series 1: 13 editions from 25 September 1975 – 18 December 1975
- Series 2: 13 editions from 30 September 1976 – 23 December 1976
- Series 3: 13 editions from 10 November 1977 – 2 February 1978

== Recorded music ==
The Animal Kwackers released a double album which featured a selection of songs from the show. Whilst the album featured some original music (such as the main title theme and the "Rory, Rory..." interlude) it was mainly made up of cover versions, including The Beatles' "Yellow Submarine" and "Lucy In The Sky With Diamonds".

The album was released on Handkerchief, a label also featuring releases by Patti Boulaye, Lenny Henry and Harvey Smith

Title: Animal Kwackers
Label: Handkerchief
Catalog#: KYD 201
Format: 2 x Vinyl, LP
Country: UK
Released: 1975

A second double album Let's Play Together was also released on Handekerchief in 1976 as was a single album Swinging on a Star

Title: Let's Play Together
Label: Handkerchief
Catalog#: KYD 202
Format: 2 x Vinyl, LP
Country: UK
Released: 1976

Title: Swinging on a Star
Label: Handkerchief
Catalog#: KYD 101
Format: Vinyl, LP
Country: UK
Released: 1976

== DVD ==
All three series (minus two episodes missing from the archive) were released on DVD on 16 April 2012.
