= The Universal Soldier (EP) =

EP by Donovan
- Released: 13 August 1965
- Recorded: 16 June 1965
- Studios: Southern Music, London
- Genre: Folk
- Length: 10:43
- Label: Pye
- Producers: Peter Eden; Terry Kennedy; Geoff Stephens

Donovan chronology
What's Bin Did and What's Bin Hid (1965)	The Universal Soldier (1965)	Fairytale (1965)

The Universal Soldier is the first EP by Scottish folk singer Donovan. The EP's tracks were recorded in June 1965 at Southern Music's studios in London and was produced by his management. The EP contains one of Donovan's songs, "The Ballad of a Crystal Man", with the rest being covers of musicians influential to him, including the title track, written by Buffy Sainte-Marie. The EP's content consists of anti-war protest songs, characterized by Donovan's finger-picking guitar technique and lyrical content regarding the contemporary Vietnam War.

Pye Records released The Universal Soldier on 13 August 1965, and marketed it as a single. Promoted by an early music video depicting Donovan in Normandy, France, The Universal Soldier reached number one on Record Retailer's EP chart and also made the top 20 on the singles charts published by Disc Weekly, Melody Maker, and the New Musical Express. The EP was not released in the US, where the title track was released as a single. Upon release, The Universal Soldier received critical acclaim by journalists, most of whom praised the lyrical topics. It was Donovan's only release that reached number one on a British chart.

== Recording and composition ==
The four tracks that made up The Universal Soldier were recorded in a single session on 16 June 1965, at Southern Music's (now Peermusic) basement studio in Denmark Street, London. As with the rest of his 1965 output, the EP was produced by his management, consisting of Peter Eden, Terry Kennedy and Geoff Stephens. Retrospectively, Donovan recalled that he "compressed" the sound of his guitar on "Universal Soldier" and "The Ballad of a Crystal Man", something that "jumped out the speaker" when he heard the playback. He additionally suggested that the tracks were recorded in one take.

In contrast to most of Donovan's other material which was self-penned, on The Universal Soldier, only "The Ballad of a Crystal Man" was written by him. It consists entirely of protest songs, a reflection of Donovan's recent social consciousness. All of the songs feature Donovan on acoustic guitar and vocals, alongside former Shadows member Brian Locking on bass. The EP's title track was written by Buffy Sainte-Marie, and was the second Sainte-Marie composition Donovan recorded, following a rendition of "Cod'ine" on his 1964 demo. It remained "firmly within the folk tradition" according to journalist Brian Hogg. "The Ballad of a Crystal Man" was a new composition performed with "very slick finger-style picking" which Donovan felt suited the recording's compression. It features him on harmonica.

Side two opens with Bert Jansch's "Do You Hear Me Now", which Steve Leggett of AllMusic believed reflected Donovan's strongest inspiration. A "fervent" song, Jansch had performed in the same folk clubs as Donovan during the 1960s, and had taught the latter the styles he played. As such, Donovan characterized "Do You Hear Me Now" as a "simple vocal" featuring a "not-so-simple" finger style. The closing track "The War Drags On" was composed by Mick Softley and once again features Donovan on harmonica. An anti-war song regarding the United States involvement in the Vietnam War, it lyrically spoke of the plight of the Vietnamese people, who had been "torn to shreds by French colonial expansionism" prior to the involvement of the US. Donovan's rendition was performed in Drop-D tuning.

== Release and commercial performance ==
Pye Records released The Universal Soldier as Donovan's first extended play on 13 August 1965, his first release since his second single "Colours" was released on 28 May. The front cover of the EP depicts toy soldiers on a march in front of a sketch depicting various trenches during World War I. Upon hearing that The Universal Soldier would consisted of a self-composed anti-war song, mass media believed the release would be a "gamble", and thus Pye marketed the release as a single rather than as an EP. Rather than to promote it on television shows, Donovan's management commissioned an early music video for "The Universal Soldier", which was directed by Johnny Stewart. It was shot on spot on a beach in Normandy, France, using rusting tanks and landing crafts from D-Day as props. The clip first aired on Top of the Pops on 7 September 1965.

Despite the "uncompromising nature of its material", The Universal Soldier entered the EP chart compiled by Record Retailer – which was published by Record Mirror – on 21 August 1965 at the No. 18 position. It displaced Manfred Mann's EP The One in the Middle from the number-one spot on 4 September, staying on the top for eight weeks before being replaced by the Kinks' Kwyet Kinks on 30 October. It exited the EP charts on 26 February 1966 at the No. 18 position, at which point it had spent 28 weeks in the top 20. The Universal Soldier sold well enough to enter the singles charts compiled by Britain's other trade magazines, reaching number 13 in Disc Weekly, No. 14 in Melody Maker, and No. 12 in the New Musical Express. Regarding the EP's commercial success, Donovan later opinioned that it became "the best-selling EP ever".

In the US, where EPs were never a popular format, The Universal Soldier was not released. Instead, Hickory Records extracted the EP's title track and released it as a single with "Do You Hear Me Now" on the B-side in September 1965, where it reached number 53 on the Billboard Hot 100. "The Ballad of a Crystal Man" was included on Donovan's second British studio album Fairytale on 22 October 1965, albeit in an alternate recording which featured an additional verse. On the US version of Fairytale, "Universal Soldier" was also included as a track. The entire EP was later included on Donovan's 1967 compilation album Universal Soldier, and the tracks were additionally issued on the 2001 re-issue of Fairytale.

== Reception and legacy ==
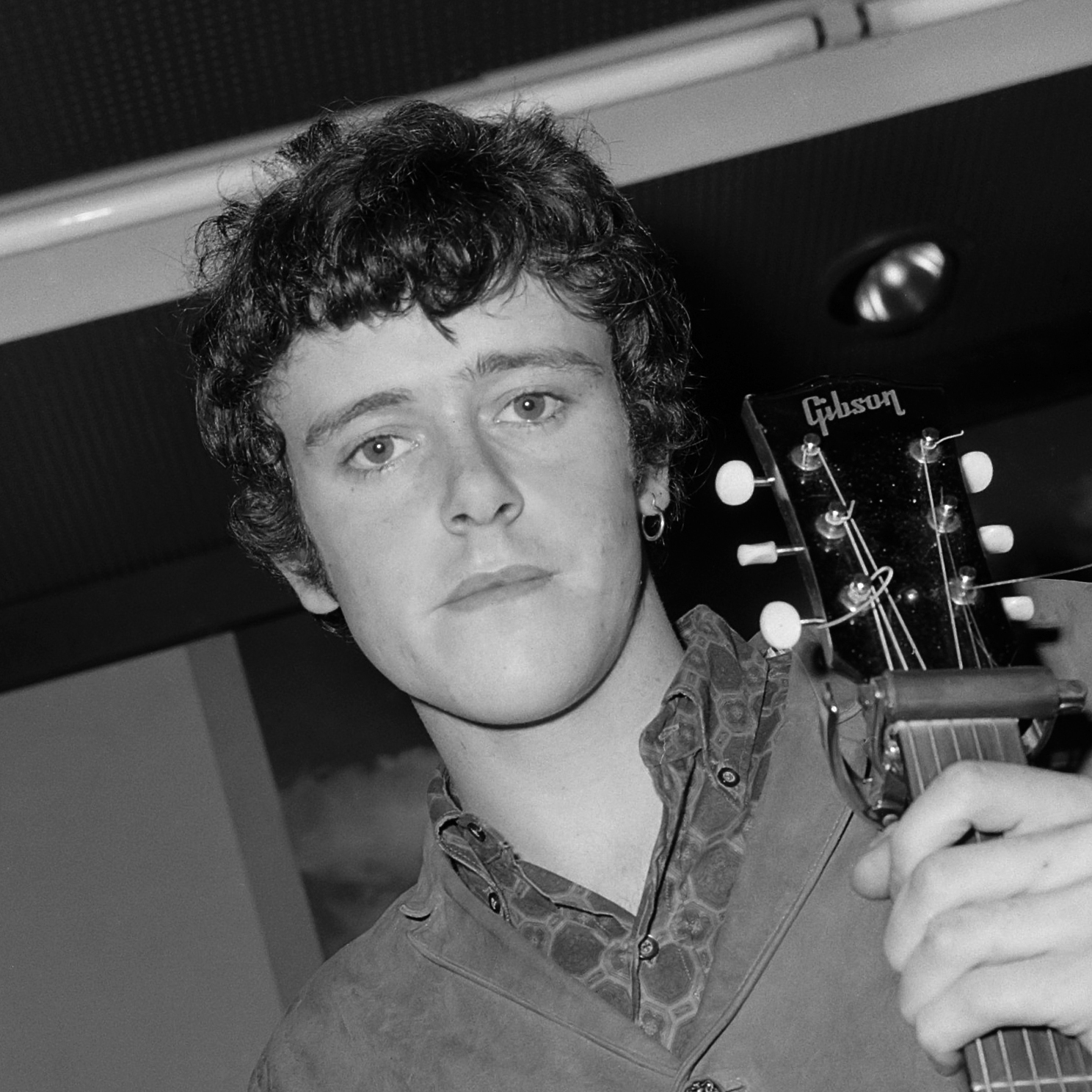
Donovan in July 1965

Upon release in Britain, The Universal Soldier received praise. Reviewing for Melody Maker, Billy Fury found the EP to be a "hit", praising Donovan's guitar style and noted him to sound "sincere", despite not enjoying political songs as music "doesn't help [the political climate] at all". Though he wished the EP carried a string arrangement, he closed the review by calling it "great". In the New Musical Express, journalist Derek Johnson found all tracks to be "tuneful" with a "throbbing beat", and believed them to be "terribly profound and deep". Although he felt the songs didn't constitute hit material, he believed the EP to be "bound to sell well" owing to Donovan's popularity. Writing for Record Mirror, Norman Jopling and Peter Jones found the EP to reflect a "first-rate sample of Donovan's philosophy and song-selling style". Though they noted the content as "morbid", Jopling and Jones praised Donovan's guitar playing and praised the disc as "refreshingly different", picking out "The War Drags On" as the stand-out track.

The EP was involved in a controversy shortly after release, with critics suggesting that Donovan unfairly criticized soldiers for performing their duties. Donovan responded that he intended it to be a commentary on soldiers being utilized as "cannon fodder". Donovan never achieved a number one album or single in the UK, making The Universal Soldier the only release of his to top a British chart. Retrospectively, Lorne Murdoch found "Do You Hear Me Now" to be a "strong rendition", but believed "The Ballad of a Crystal Man" to be the "loveliest song on the record". Jeff Tamarkin of AllMusic believed that the "borrowed" anti-war songs ("Universal Soldier" and "The War Drags On") contain lyrical content that are "direct but comparatively simplistic", believing his lyrics were headed into more "fanciful writing" shortly afterwards. He does note the cover of "Do You Hear Me Now" as "finely attuned".

== Track listing ==
Side one:

1. "Universal Soldier" (Buffy Sainte-Marie) – 2:09
2. "The Ballad of a Crystal Man" (Donovan) – 3:13

Side two:

1. "Do You Hear Me Now" (Bert Jansch) – 1:46
2. "The War Drags On" (Mick Softley) – 3:35

== Personnel ==
Personnel according to the 2001 re-issue of Fairytale, unless otherwise noted.

- Donovan – vocals, harmonica ("The Ballad of a Crystal Man" and "The War Drags On"), acoustic guitar
- Brian Locking – bass
- Peter Eden – producer
- Terry Kennedy – producer
- Geoff Stephens – producer

== Charts ==
Weekly chart performance for The Universal Soldier
Chart (1965–1966)	Peak position
Australian Kent Music Report singles chart	13
Dutch Veronica Top 40 singles chart	9
Dutch Single Top 100 singles chart	8
Irish Radio Eireann singles chart	14
Swedish Kvällstoppen singles and albums chart	10
Swedish Tio i Topp singles chart	12
UK Disc Weekly singles chart	13
UK Melody Maker singles chart	14
UK New Musical Express singles chart	12
UK Record Retailer EP chart	1

== See also ==
- Donovan discography
- List of number-one EPs in the United Kingdom
