= Songs for Swingin' Survivors =

Studio album by Mick Softley
- Released: 1965
- Genre: Folk
- Label: Columbia
- Producer: Peter Eden, Geoff Stephens

Mick Softley chronology
Songs for Swingin' Survivors	Sunrise

Songs for Swingin' Survivors is Mick Softley's first album, released by Columbia Records in 1965. The album was produced by Peter Eden and Geoff Stephens, who had previously discovered Donovan. The album was re-released on CD by Hux Records in 2003.

== Track listing ==
1. After The Third World War Is Over
2. The Bells Of Rhymney
3. Strange Fruit
4. Blues For Cupid Green
5. All I Want Is A Chance
6. The War Drags On
7. Keep Movin´On
8. Jeannie
9. What Makes The Wind To Blow
10. I´ve Gotta Deal You Can't Turn Down
11. West Country Girl
12. Plains Of The Buffalo

== Critical reception ==
Professional ratings
Review scores
Source	Rating
Allmusic	3/5 stars

The album flopped.
