= The Best of Donovan =

The Best of Donovan may refer to:

- The Best of Donovan (1969 album)
- The Best of Donovan (1982 album)
