= Purple Onion =

Purple Onion may refer to:

- Red onion, a type of onion
- Purple Onion (album), a 2002 album by the Les Claypool Frog Brigade
- The Purple Onion, a nightclub in San Francisco, California, US
- The Purple Onion (Toronto), a 1960–1965 music venue in Toronto, Ontario, Canada
