= Like It Is =

Like It Is may refer to:

- Like It Is (film)
- Like It Is (TV series)
- "Like It Is" (song), a 2020 single by Kygo, Zara Larsson and Tyga
- Like It Is, a 2017 album by the band Tigress

== See also ==
- Like It Is, Was, and Evermore Shall Be, a compilation album by Donovan
- Like It Is: Yes at the Bristol Hippodrome, a 2014 live album by the band Yes
