= G.T. Moore =

Background information
- Born: Gerald Thomas Moore; 2 May 1949 (age 77); Reading, Berkshire, England
- Genres: Reggae; folk; roots music
- Occupations: Musician; songwriter; producer
- Instruments: Vocals; guitar; piano
- Years active: Late 1960s–present
- Labels: Charisma; Dawn; Decca
- Website: gtmooremusic.com

Gerald Thomas Moore (born 2 May 1949) is an English singer, composer and multi-instrumentalist with a recording career that stretches back to the early 1970s. Moore recorded and performed with numerous musicians such as Jimmy Cliff, Lee 'Scratch' Perry, Thin Lizzy, Johnny Nash, and Joan Baez, and Airto Moreira covered his songs.

== Early life and career ==
Moore was born in Reading, Berkshire, England. Moore started playing about the age of 14 at the English Martyrs Youth Club, Tilehurst. The first band was called The Missing Links but they quickly changed the name to The Muddy Waters and eventually stayed with the name: The Delta Sound. The Delta Sound evolved along with the British scene from Chicago blues to soul. At the end The Delta Sound had a large brass line-up. When The Memphis Gents singer, Terry Webster, became sick, Moore was asked to replace him temporarily but soon became the permanent singer of one of the top Reading bands. Most of the band members went to the same school as Moore, Ashmead. After moving to Maidenhead to go to Art School and later to London, Moore experimented with his own solo band. His first solo recording was 'I Wouldn't Mind' on the folk blues compilation 'Firepoint' released in 1969.

== Heron ==
In this same period Moore met Roy Apps and Tony Pook at the Dolphin folk club in Maidenhead, and with them formed the band Heron. Heron's line-up moved around in this period and included Robert Collins, Tony Brummle Smith and Martin Hayward. Producer and manager Peter Eden was brought to see the band and with a new album planned Steve Jones was brought in to bolster the sound. Their first album is most notable for the fact that all the music was actually recorded outdoors in a field by the River Thames. In 1971 they got in to Pye Studios for their first studio recording, a maxi single with a version of Bob Dylan's 'Hobo'. The second album was released as a double album at the price of one. Like the first album, it was again recorded outdoors, this time outside a Devon country cottage, which gives the album a unique atmosphere. This album shows a greater variety of musical styles compared to the debut album. But still the acoustic folk-style is predominant mixed with some more rocking tunes.

== G.T. Moore and the Reggae Guitars ==
In the spring of 1973 a new reggae band was formed, 'G.T. Moore and the Reggae Guitars'. The line-up included Tom Whyte, Martin Hayward, Malcolm Mortimore, Tony Hannaford, Tom Robinson and Tim Jones. But there were several variations of their band with guest musicians like John 'Rabbit' Bundrick, Steve Holley and Tony Braunagel. At some point they had two drummers, congas and a three-piece brass section. They started off on the Pub Rock circuit but grew fastly to eventually play gigs all over the country and in Europe. Moore signed to the Charisma label and released two albums: G.T. Moore & The Reggae Guitars (1974) and Reggae Blue (1975) and five 7" singles. Attracting both white and black fans touring with Jimmy Cliff, Betty Wright, Thin Lizzy and Dr Feelgood. An American launch was set up and a mix of live and studio material was released in America but shortly after, in 1977, the band split up. A third studio album was recorded but never got released. Later in 1979 Airto Moreira did a Brazilian cover of Move It on Up. In 1985 he covered this again but now with Flora Purim.

== Session work ==
After the split up, Moore focused on session work. He went to America to play on Johnny Nash's 'Tears on My Pillow'. It is there he met Tony Braunagel and Terry Wilson, with whom he later formed 'The Rhythm Tramps'. They played almost exclusively in Europe, mainly Amsterdam.

Eventually Moore started living in Amsterdam. It's there he met Henk Targowski, who was then working at the famous coffeeshop De Melkweg. Henk was the former of 'Black Star Liner', a distribution company and record label with the purpose of releasing Jamaica's best producers. Recently visiting Lee 'Scratch' Perry, Targowski had to find session players for his new Upsetters album, so he asked Moore and some of the Rhythm Tramps to audition. The audition went well. The album would be recorded in Lee Perry's Black Ark Studios in Kingston so a trip to Jamaica was set up. Musicians added to the entourage included former Rhythm Tramps keyboardist James Lascelles and saxophonist Bud Beadle, a former member of Geno Washington's Ram Jam Band. While they were there the situation became chaotic and it took a while before they started recording the album but still constantly music was played with or without Perry. Many other musicians like Joe Higgs, Rico Rodriguez, Max Romeo, Dwight Pickney would come to the studio. Meanwhile, Moore was also doing sessions with Zap Pow at Harry J's and with Sly & Robbie at Channel One. Back in Europe he did some session work on Poly Styrene's album 'Translucence'.

In the early and mid 1970s, he also played on most of Shusha Guppy's studio albums. Together they were responsible for the soundtrack to the 1976 documentary film People Of The Wind. The following year, the film was nominated for the Best Documentary Feature Oscar and also for a Golden Globe. The film follows the annual migration of the nomadic Bakhtiari tribes in southern Iran. The soundtrack was later released on vinyl in the US.

== Selected discography ==
=== Collaborations ===
- G.T. Moore and the Reggae Guitars – G.T. Moore and the Reggae Guitars (1974)
- G.T. Moore and the Reggae Guitars – I'm Still Waiting / Judgement Day 7" (1974) [CB 236]
- G.T. Moore and the Reggae Guitars – Reggae Blue (1975)
- G.T. Moore and the Reggae Guitars – Reggae Reggae / Otis Blue 7" (1975) [CB 263]
- G.T. Moore & Shusha – People of the Wind Soundtrack (1977) [CRS 1001]
- G.T. Moore and The Outsiders – You're The One 7" (1981) [PP 016]
- G.T. Moore & The Goldmaster Allstars – Alpha (2011) [GMCD004]
- G.T. Moore & The Lost Ark Band – Seek The Kingdom First (2013) [LAMCD001]

=== Solo ===
- Gerald Thomas Moore – Song of America / Wake Up 7"(1972/1973) [UK17]
- G.T. Moore – Utopia 7" (1980) [BSL005]
- G.T. Moore – Meets the High Tech Roots Dynamics at Channel One UK (1993) [JW011-L]
- G.T. Moore – Turn Israel 10" (1995) [JW-016TS]
- G.T. Moore - Ganja Flower - Jah Works 10" (2002) JW033TI
- G.T. Moore – Herb of Africa / Secret Love 12" (2009) [JW041T]
- G.T Moore - Utopia b/w G.T Moore - Utopia Dub - Partial Records 7" - PRTL7012 (2014 reissue)
- G.T. Moore and The Lost Ark Band - Be True, Be True Dub b/w G.T. Moore and The Lost Ark Band - One Two Three Simple As Dub - PRTL12003 Partial Records 12" (2014)
- G.T. Moore - Jerusalem b/w G.T. Moore - Solomon's Temple - Partial Records 7" - PRTL7024 (2015)
- G.T. Moore - Ganja Flower EP Part One: Ganja Flower, Ganja Flower Dub, Divided City b/w Divided City Dub, New Day. New Day Dub - Partial Records 10" PRTL10008 (2016)
- G.T. Moore - Ganja Flower EP Part Two: Heal the Blind, Heal the Blind Dub, Sound of the Ghetto b/w Sound of the Ghetto Dub, Turn Israel, Turn Israel Dub - Partial Records 10" PRTL10009 (2016)
- G.T. Moore - Serengeti b/w G.T. Moore - Serengeti Dub - Partial Records 7" - PRTL7047 (2017)
- G.T. Moore - The Harry J Sessions - Partial Records LP / CD - PRTLLP001 / PRTLCD001 (2018)

• G.T. Moore - Concrete Jungle - Partial Records 7” PRTLDP002 - one-sided 100 copies (2019)

- G.T. Moore & Goldmaster All Stars - Alpha - Partial Records 10” - PRTL10024 (2020)
- G.T. Moore - Jerusalem (Harry J Cut) b/w Mount Zion Dub - Partial Records 7” - PRTL7069 (2021)
- G.T. Moore - Individualism b/w Individualism Dub - Partial Records 7” - PRTL7083 (2023)

=== Heron ===
- Heron (1970) [DNLS 3010]
- Twice as Nice & Half the Price (1971) [DNLS 3025]
- The Best of Heron (1988) [SEE CD 242]
- Upon Reflection – The Dawn Anthology (2006) [CMDDD 1432]
- Simple as One Two Three (2011) [AIRNF-011]
- King's Road (2011) [AIRPROMO-025]

=== Selected session work ===
- Mike Cooper and the Machine Gun Co. – Places I Know (1971) [DNLS 3026]
- Shusha – From East To West (1974) [UAS 29575] & (1978) [TGS 138]
- Johnny Nash – Tears on My Pillow (1975) [CBS 69148]
- Shusha – Before the Deluge (1975) [UAS 29879]
- Christopher Jones – No More Range to Roam (1978) [B0055TLQTU]
- Lee "Scratch" Perry – The Return of Pipecock Jackxon (1980) [BSLP 9002]
- Poly Styrene – Translucence (1980) [UAG 30320]
- Wigbert – Ticket in De Nachtkastla (1991) [VR211723]
- Radical Dance Faction – Wasteland (1991) [EZ3V]
- Brian Nelson – Beautiful Losers (1995) [FR4004]
- Goldmaster Allstars – Dub Style (2007) [GMCD0003]
- Congo Ashanti Roy & Pura Vida – Hard Road (2012) [LAM002]

== Bibliography ==
- People Funny Boy, David Katz (ISBN 9781846094439)
- The Guinness Encyclopedia of Popular Music, Lincoln, Abe-Primettes (ISBN 0-85112-939-0)
- The Virgin encyclopaedia of 70s music, Colin Larkin (ISBN 9781852279479)
- Electric Eden, Rob Young (ISBN 9780571237524)
