= Hey Gyp (Dig the Slowness) =

1965 song by Donovan

Single by Donovan
- A-side: "Turquoise"
- Released: 30 October 1965
- Recorded: October 1965
- Studio: Peer Music, Denmark Street, London
- Genre: Folk rock
- Length: 2:45
- Label: Pye
- Songwriter: Donovan
- Producers: Peter Eden, Geoff Stephens, Terry Kennedy

"Hey Gyp (Dig the Slowness)" is a song by Donovan. He based it on "Can I Do It For You", a song by Memphis Minnie and Kansas Joe McCoy. The name "Gyp" refers to Donovan's best friend, Gyp Mills, known then as Gypsy Dave, and is one of many songs that Donovan wrote and recorded as a dedication to his close friends.

Pye Records first released the song in the UK as the B-side to Donovan's song "Turquoise" in October 1965. Similar single releases in Canada, France, and Scandinavia followed. Hickory Records released it as the A-side to the Vietnam-themed "The War Drags On" in July 1966. In France, it was issued as a B-side to "Colours" in 1975. The song has since been issued on numerous collections of Donovan's music and as a bonus track to his 1965 album Fairytale (1996).

== Cover versions ==
"Hey Gyp"

Song by Eric Burdon & the Animals

from the album Animalism
- Released: 1966
- Recorded: 4 July 1966
- Genre: Psychedelic rock
- Length: 3:46
- Label: MGM
- Songwriter: Donovan
- Producer: Tom Wilson

The Animals recorded the song in December 1966 for the Animalism album. After reconfiguring the band as Eric Burdon and the Animals, they continued to perform it in their live set and released it as the title track of a four-song EP in France in 1967.

Others to record the song include the Jim Kweskin & His Jug Band on their 1966 release See Reverse Side For Title; the Soul Survivors for the B-side to their 1967 hit "Expressway to Your Heart"; Belfast Gypsies (1967); Santa Esmeralda (1977); The Vietnam Veterans on their debut album On The Right Track Now (1983) and The Raconteurs on Help Us Stranger (2019).
