= Heron (band) =

Band

- Origin: Maidenhead, Berkshire, England
- Genres: Folk-rock
- Years active: 1967–1972, later reunions
- Labels: Dawn, Relaxx
- Members: Roy Apps; Steve Jones; Gerald T. Moore
- Past members: Tony Pook; Martin Hayward; T. J. Robinson; Gerry Power
- Website: www.heronfolk.com

Heron are an English folk-rock band who released two albums in the early-1970s and have continued to perform since reforming in the 1990s.

== History ==
=== Origins ===
The band had its origins in 1967 at the Dolphin Folk Club in Maidenhead, Berkshire, where Tony Pook (vocals), Roy Apps (guitar, vocals), and Robert Collins (guitar) played together, inspired by Bob Dylan and The Incredible String Band. When Collins left, Pook and Apps were joined by Gerald T. Moore (guitar, mandolin, vocals), who had previously played in R&B bands in Reading, and Martin Hayward (guitar), to form Heron. As student entertainments secretary at Reading College of Technology, Apps was able to book his own band as support act to performers such as Ralph McTell. Gus Dudgeon signed them as songwriters to Essex Music and the group won the support of A&R man and record producer Peter Eden, who had worked with Donovan, Mick Softley and others. After Hayward left the band, to be replaced by Steve Jones (keyboards), the group won a recording contract with the Dawn label, a subsidiary of Pye Records.

Peter Eden became their producer, but the band quickly realised that they disliked recording in a studio environment. In 1970, they stayed at Pook's family farmhouse at Appleford-on-Thames in Berkshire, and recorded an album with a mobile studio in a field behind the house, picking up ambient noises such as bird song. The songwriting was shared between Apps, Pook and Moore. Released in November 1970, the self-titled album achieved only moderate success. The band toured with Comus, Titus Groan and Demon Fuzz on Dawn's loss-making Penny Concert tour, and appeared on John Peel's Top Gear radio show. They released a single, Moore's song "Bye and Bye", which received considerable airplay but failed to sell in large quantities because of problems of vinyl supply followed by a strike of delivery drivers. They continued to perform, on one occasion supporting David Bowie at a BBC Radio 1 concert.

Heron recorded their second album in a cottage garden at Black Dog, a small village near Crediton in Devon. As well as Pook, Apps, Moore and Jones, musicians on the album included Bill Boazman (electric guitar), Mike Cooper (slide guitar), Mike Finesilver (bass), and Terry Gittings (drums). The recordings were issued as a double LP, Twice As Nice & Half the Price, and included unexpected cover versions of songs including "This Old Heart of Mine" which Moore had played in his previous bands. Pook later commented: "I think that there was enough material there for one very good album, but one quite mediocre double album. But we wanted two records for the price of one. That was the hippie ethos behind it, for people to get value for money – which I think they did." Disagreements within the band led to Moore leaving – he later backed singer Shusha and then formed G. T. Moore and His Reggae Guitars – and the record company reduced its support. The band disbanded in 1972.

=== Reformation ===
Interest in the band was maintained by record collectors, especially in Japan. In 1997, Apps, Pook and Jones, together with Gerry Power (vocals, keyboards, percussion), returned to Black Dog to record a new album as Heron, River of Fortune, and performed for villagers at a show later released on CD as Black Dog In Concert. A set of recordings made by Apps, Pook and Jones with T. J. Robinson (guitar, vocals), in 1991, Hystorical, was released in 1999. In 2011, Moore returned to join Apps, Pook and Jones to record a new album, Simple As One Two Three, and in 2013 the same line-up recorded and released Jokerman - Songs of Bob Dylan. A collection of demo recordings made in 1983 was released as Open Up the Road in 2015. The following year, the band toured Japan and recorded a live album in Kyoto, released as Live in Kyoto in 2017.

Singer Tony Pook died from Alzheimer's disease on 16 October 2020.

== Discography ==
- Heron (Dawn, 1970)
- Twice As Nice & Half the Price (Dawn, 1971)
- River of Fortune (Relaxx, 1998)
- Hystorical (Relaxx, recorded 1991, released 1999)
- Black Dog In Concert (Relaxx, 2000)
- Black Dog (Hux Records, 2005)
- Simple As One Two Three (Nice Folks, 2011)
- Jokerman - Songs of Bob Dylan (Wasabi, 2013)
- Open Up the Road (Relaxx, recorded 1983, released 2015)
- Live In Kyoto (Wasabi, 2017)
