= Glenn Barber =

American country music singer-songwriter (1935–2008)

- Born: Martin Glenn Barber; February 2, 1935; Hollis, Oklahoma, U.S.
- Died: March 28, 2008 (aged 73) Gallatin, Tennessee, U.S.
- Genres: Country
- Occupation: Singer-songwriter
- Years active: 1954–1980
- Labels: Hickory

Martin Glenn Barber (February 2, 1935 – March 28, 2008) was an American country music and rockabilly singer-songwriter. He recorded for Hickory Records in the 1970s, releasing three albums and charting 21 singles on Hot Country Songs. His highest chart entry was "Unexpected Goodbye", which reached number 23.

One of his final brushes with the charts occurred in 1979 with "Everyone Wants to Disco". In discovering that 'they' did not, he changed career and pursued other avenues such as painting and screenwriting.

Glenn Barber died in Gallatin, Tennessee, in March 2008, at the age of 73.

== Discography ==
=== Albums ===
Year	Album	Label
1970	New Star	Hickory
1972	The Best of Glenn Barber	Hickory
1974	Glenn Barber	MGM/Hickory

=== Singles ===
Year	Single	Chart Positions		Album
Year	Single	US Country	CAN Country	Album
1964	"How Can I Forget You"	48	—	singles only
1964	"If Anyone Can Show Cause" –	42	—	singles only
1964	"Stronger Than Dirt"	27	—	singles only
1964	"Dancing Shoes"	—	—	singles only
1965	"Loneliest Man in Town"	—	—	singles only
1965	"Happy Birthday Broken Heart"	—	—	singles only
1968	"Go Home Letter (I Wish That I Were You)"	—	—	singles only
1968	"Don't Worry 'Bout the Mule (Just Load the Wagon)"	41	—	New Star
1969	"I Don't Want No More of the Cheese"	—	—	New Star
1969	"Gonna Make My Mama Proud of Me"	—	—	New Star
1969	"Kissed by the Rain, Warmed by the Sun"	24	25	New Star
1970	"She Cheats on Me"	28	—	New Star
1970	"Poison Red Berries"	72	—	The Best of Glenn Barber
1970	"Al"	—	—	single only
1971	"Yes, Dear, There Is a Virginia"	75	—	The Best of Glenn Barber
1971	"I Committed the Crime"	—	—	singles only
1971	"Blue Eyes Crying in the Rain"	—	—	singles only
1971	"Betty Ann"	—	—	The Best of Glenn Barber
1972	"I'm the Man on Susie's Mind"	28	—	The Best of Glenn Barber
1972	"Unexpected Goodbye"	23	—	The Best of Glenn Barber
1973	"Yes Ma'm (I Found Her in a Honky Tonk)"	67	94	The Best of Glenn Barber
1973	"Country Girl (I Love You Still)"	61	—	Glenn Barber
1973	"That's How a Coward Tells an Angel Goodbye"	—	90	Glenn Barber
1973	"Daddy Number Two"	45	85	Glenn Barber
1974	"You Only Live Once (In Awhile)"	65	—	Glenn Barber
1974	"Blue Eyes Crying in the Rain" (re-release)	—	—	Glenn Barber
1974	"Sweet on My Mind"	—	—	Glenn Barber
1975	"She's No Ordinary Woman"	—	—	Glenn Barber
1976	"It Took a Drunk (To Drive God's Message Home)"	—	—	singles only
1977	"(You Better Be) One Hell of a Woman"	79	—	singles only
1978	"Cry, Cry Darling"	67	—	singles only
1978	"What's the Name of That Song?"	30	—	singles only
1979	"Love Songs Just for You"	27	—	singles only
1979	"Everybody Wants to Disco"	76	—	singles only
1979	"Woman's Touch"	70	—	singles only
1980	"First Love Feelings"	74	—	singles only
