= Jimmy Elledge =

American country music singer-songwriter (1943–2012)

James Presley Elledge (January 8, 1943 – June 10, 2012) was an American country musician.

Born in Nashville, Tennessee, Elledge sent a demo tape to Chet Atkins when he was 18 years old, which resulted in a recording contract with RCA Victor. His second recording for the label was "Funny How Time Slips Away", which was written by Willie Nelson and produced by Atkins. The song became a hit, peaking at No. 22 on the Billboard Hot 100 in 1961, and sold over one million copies. Elledge recorded for Hickory Records later in the 1960s but never had another hit.

Elledge recorded a 14-song CD in 2005 in New Orleans called Passion, and was just beginning promotion and showcases for the album when he suffered a debilitating stoke.

Elledge died on June 10, 2012, at age 69, after complications following a stroke.
