= Any Mother Doesn't Grumble =

Any Mother Doesn't Grumble is an LP released in 1972 by Mick Softley, produced by Tony Cox under the CBS record label in the UK and the Netherlands, and the Epic record label in Japan. It was reissued on CD by Cherry Red Records in November 2016. The cover art work is by Ian Beck.

== Track listing ==
1. Song That I Sing
2. Hello, Little Flower
3. Sing While You Can
4. Minstrel Song
5. Magdalene's Song
6. Traveller's Song
7. From The Land Of The Grab
8. Lady Willow
9. Great Wall Of Cathay
10. If Wishes Were Horses
11. Have You Ever Really Seen
12. I'm So Confused
