= Gyp Mills =

English sculptor and songwriter (1946–2019)

Gyp Mills (born David John Mills, 9 July 1946 – 18 June 2019), also known as Gypsy Dave, was an English sculptor and songwriter. He was first in the public eye as the companion to the singer-songwriter, Donovan. He was also a well-known sculptor with studios in Greece and Thailand.

== Early years ==
Mills was born in Peckham Rye, London, before moving to Hertfordshire. In his early days in Hertfordshire he became friends with many art students, including Dave Richards, Julian McAllister and Donovan. In 1963 he made a pivotal journey to St. Ives, Cornwall with Donovan. He lost touch with Donovan and moved around the UK including Manchester and Nottingham.

In late 1964 Donovan had been signed up to a record label and asked Mills to accompany him on his first tour with his other friends Mac MacLeod and John Lock. Donovan wrote "To Try for the Sun" and "Hey Gyp (Dig the Slowness)" about his time with Mills. Mills was tour manager for Donovan for many years, and appeared alongside Donovan in the TV film, A Boy Called Donovan.

In 1968 they both journeyed to be with the Maharishi Mahesh Yogi and The Beatles in Rishikesh, India. Mills wrote a few songs which appeared on Donovan's album, The Hurdy Gurdy Man. The uncredited tracks "A Sunny Day" and "The River Song" according to BMI records were collaborations with Donovan, but the song "Tangier" was written solely by Mills under its original title of "In Tangier Down a Windy Street". Altogether he has 20 songs registered at BMI.com under his real name of David J. Mills.

"Gyp was Donovan's right hand man and a great job he did of it too" – Mac MacLeod talking about Donovan's first tour in 1965 from KFOK-LP radio interview on 14 June 2005.

== Sculpture and beyond ==
From 1968 to 1971 Mills studied sculpture including personal tuition with David Wynne. At this time he moved away from his music industry connections towards the visual arts. In the years that followed he restored a farm house and set up a studio on the Greek island of Paros. His works were exhibited in Gordons Gallery, Wimbledon; The Fulham Gallery, Fulham Road, London; Doves Gallery, Norwich, and The Welsh House Gallery, North Wales. In 1979 he wrote a children's book entitled Sandy Lea for which Rita Schmeiser provided the illustrations. The 1986 film Castaway with Oliver Reed and Amanda Donohoe used his song "Tangier" extensively. By 1997 Mills turned his attention back to sculpture, and became a well-respected artist and writer in Greece.

== Later years ==
In 2006 Mills married his partner Pannee in Thailand, and finished building a school of sculpture and an artist's retreat. He was working on his autobiography and a few of his early adventures are to be found in Donovan's book The Hurdy Gurdy Man. Before the release of his book Donovan stated in an interview in musicohm.com "So I've been doing this book for quite a long while! It's almost complete, I've got it in my bag, I'm doing the last corrections. Gypsy Dave my road buddy has been helping too. In Greece last year we spent quite a lot of time working on it."

Mills died in Thailand in 2019.
