= What's Bin Did and What's Bin Hid =

Studio album by Donovan
- Released: 14 May 1965 (UK); June 1965 (US)
- Recorded: February – March 1965
- Studios: Southern Music, London
- Genres: Folk; blues
- Length: 31:50
- Labels: Pye (UK); Hickory (US)
- Producers: Terry Kennedy; Peter Eden; Geoff Stephens

Donovan chronology
What's Bin Did and What's Bin Hid (1965)	The Universal Soldier (1965)

Singles from What's Bin Did and What's Bin Hid
- 1. "Catch the Wind" b/w "Why Do You Treat Me Like You Do?" Released: March 1965; 2. "Josie" b/w "Little Tin Soldier" Released: February 1966; 3. "Remember the Alamo" b/w "The Ballad of a Crystal Man" Released: April 1966, withdrawn 4. "You'll Need Somebody on Your Bond" b/w "The Little Tin Soldier" Released: November 1965 (US)

2002 reissue
- Sanctuary Records (slipcover)

What's Bin Did and What's Bin Hid is the debut album from Scottish singer-songwriter Donovan. It was released in the UK on 14 May 1965, through Pye Records (catalog number NPL 18117). Terry Kennedy, Peter Eden, and Geoff Stephens produced the album. The album was released in the US as Catch the Wind on Hickory Records in June 1965. Hickory Records changed the title to match that of Donovan's debut single.

== History ==
In late 1964, Peter Eden and Geoff Stephens offered Donovan a recording contract with Pye Records in the UK. Donovan had performed around Britain and had become well known in British folk circles before his record contract. His 1964 demo tapes (released as Sixty Four in 2004) show a great resemblance to both Woody Guthrie and Bob Dylan, which probably prompted the "British answer to Bob Dylan" press line that was subsequently released. What's Bin Did and What's Bin Hid is notable because it captures Donovan at a point where his style and vision were starting to diverge significantly from those of Guthrie and Dylan.

The music primarily consists of Donovan singing and playing mouth harp and acoustic guitar, much like his live performances of the time. He still had some vestiges of Woody Guthrie's style, and here covers Guthrie's "Riding In My Car" (titled here as "Car Car"). What's Bin Did and What's Bin Hid also includes British folk ("Tangerine Puppet") and elements of jazz ("Cuttin' Out").

Donovan re-recorded "Catch the Wind" for the album, which was initially released as his debut single in the UK on 12 March 1965.

Other musicians featured on the album are Brian Locking on bass, Skip Alan (who joined the Pretty Things later the same year) on drums, and Gypsy Dave on kazoo.

== Reception ==
Professional ratings
Review scores
Source	Rating
Allmusic	Original album
Allmusic	2002 reissue
Encyclopedia of Popular Music	4/5 stars
Record Mirror	5/5 stars

The initial Billboard magazine review compared Donovan to America's Bob Dylan, but said that "Though his style and music resemble that of Dylan, he nonetheless 's distinctive, unusual and expert to his field, enough to stand on his own."

John Bush on AllMusic reviewed the album and said that "Though he was often derided at the time as a pale imitation of Bob Dylan, there isn't a lot of evidence here", continuing "...but his style is his own, slanted toward the mysticism of British folk less than the earthiness of its American cousin."

== Chart performance ==
In the UK the album reached No. 3, with no other album of his reaching a higher position. In the United States it debuted on Billboard magazine's Top LP's chart in the issue dated 17 July, 1965, peaking at No. 30 during a twenty-three-week run on the chart. The album debuted on Cashbox magazine's Top 100 Albums chart in the issue dated 10 July, 1965, peaking at No. 23 during a twenty-eight-week run on the chart.

== Reissues ==
- On 13 September 1968, What's Bin Did and What's Bin Hid was reissued in an edited form (Marble Arch Records MAL 795) in the UK. "Car Car" and "Donna Donna" were both removed from the album, possibly because they were not written by Donovan.
- On 26 February 1996, Sequel Records reissued What's Bin Did and What's Bin Hid in the US under its US title Catch the Wind on compact disc. Three bonus tracks were added to the track listing. The first bonus track, "Why Do You Treat Me Like You Do?", was released as the B-side to Donovan's UK debut single. The second bonus track is the A-side of Donovan's UK debut single. The third bonus track, "Every Man Has His Chain", was originally released on Donovan's Catch the Wind EP in France.
- On 22 January 2002, Sanctuary Records reissued the complete What's Bin Did and What's Bin Hid for the first time on compact disc. The US version of the CD titled Catch the Wind was released six years earlier. The CD features four bonus tracks. The first two tracks are Donovan's debut single "Catch the Wind" (a different take than the album track) and its b-side "Why Do You Treat Me Like You Do?". The third bonus track "Every Man Has His Chain" was once a rare track in Donovan's discography, and was originally released on the French EP Catch the Wind in 1965. Donovan's second single "Colours" is also released here, in a version different from the one included on the Fairytale album.

== Track listing ==
All tracks written by Donovan Leitch, unless otherwise noted.

Side one

1. "Josie" – 3:28
2. "Catch the Wind" – 2:56
3. "Remember the Alamo" (Jane Bowers) – 3:04
4. "Cuttin' Out" – 2:19
5. "Car Car" (Woody Guthrie) – 1:31
6. "Keep on Truckin'" (traditional; arranged by Leitch) – 1:50

Side 2

1. "Goldwatch Blues" (Mick Softley) – 2:33
2. "To Sing for You" – 2:45
3. "You're Gonna Need Somebody on Your Bond" (traditional; arranged by Leitch) – 4:04
4. "Tangerine Puppet" – 1:51
5. "Donna Donna" (Aaron Zeitlin, Sholom Secunda) – 2:56
6. "Ramblin' Boy" – 2:33

== Personnel ==
- Donovan – vocals, acoustic guitar, harmonica
- Brian Locking – bass
- Skip Alan (Alan Skipper) – drums
- Gypsy Dave (David Mills) – kazoo

== Charts ==
Weekly chart performance for What's Bin Did and What's Bin Hid
Chart (1965–66)	Peak position
Finnish Mitä Suomi Soittaa LPs Chart	4
UK Melody Maker Top Ten LPs	4
UK New Musical Express Best Selling LPs in Britain	3
UK Record Retailer LPs Chart	3
US Billboard Top LP's	30
US Cash Box Top 100 Albums	23
US Record World Top 100 LP's	25
West German Media Control Albums Chart	33
