= The Purple Onion (Toronto) =

Canadian music venue

Purple Onion Coffee House
- Interactive map of Purple Onion Coffee House
- Address: 35 Avenue Road; Toronto; Canada
- Coordinates: 43°40′13.99″N 79°23′40.77″W
- Owner: Barry Witkin, Sam Gutmacher, Al Lastman and Mel Isen
- Type: Coffeehouse
- Event: Folk music

Construction
- Opened: 1960
- Closed: 1965

The Purple Onion Coffee House was a music venue at 35 Avenue Road in the Yorkville neighbourhood of Toronto, Canada. It operated from 1960 to 1965. It was a popular venue for folk musicians.

== History ==
The Purple Onion was opened by Barry Witkin, Sam Gutmacher and Al Lastman (brother of former Toronto mayor Mel Lastman) and Mel Isen in 1960 and was one of the first coffee houses to be opened in the Yorkville area of Toronto. Witkin reported in the Toronto Star that “They pooled their savings, rented the building for about $750 a month and charged $1 club memberships and entrance fees of $1.50 to $3.” In keeping with the strict liquor laws of the day the venue did not have a liquor license and no alcoholic beverages could be served.

The Purple Onion was a popular spot in the folk music scene and was an early performance venue for Buffy Sainte Marie, Ian and Sylvia Tyson, and many others. It was reputed to be the first place to host singer Carly Simon, who early on performed as a duo with her sister Lucy Simon. Gordon Lightfoot performed at first with his duo the Two Tones, and later as a solo act. Performers from outside of Canada also made stops, including Judy Collins.

One of the best known stories about the Purple Onion is in 1963 Buffy Sainte Marie wrote the song "Universal Soldier", later recorded and made famous by Donovan, in the coffee house's basement.
