= Hickory Records =

American record label

- Parent company: Sony Music Publishing
- Founded: 1954; 72 years ago (original); 2007; 19 years ago (relaunch)
- Founder: Acuff-Rose Music
- Distributor: The Orchard
- Genre: Country, Pop
- Country of origin: U.S.
- Location: Nashville, Tennessee
- Official website: Archived site

Hickory Records is an American record label founded in 1954 by Acuff-Rose Music, which operated the label up to 1979. Sony Music Publishing (then Sony/ATV) revived the label in 2007. Originally based in Nashville, and functioning as an independent label throughout its history, it has had several distributors.

== History ==
From its inception in 1955 to 1973, Hickory was distributed independently. MGM Records then distributed the label in 1973, and ABC Records began distributing it four years later. MCA Records inherited the ABC distribution deal when it bought ABC Records in 1979. The relationship between Acuff-Rose/Hickory and MCA turned sour shortly afterwards, so the Hickory label was discontinued, and its catalog was pulled when the distribution deal expired later in 1979.

In 1993, Scotti Bros. Records began reissuing the Hickory catalog.

The Hickory catalog is owned by Sony Music Publishing, which owns the Acuff-Rose catalogue, and the Hickory label was revived in 2007 with an album by Elliott Yamin. The output of the revived Hickory Records is distributed by Sony Music's RED Distribution unit.

Although Hickory began as a country music label, it signed some rock groups, such as Neal Ford and the Fanatics, The Sparkles (from Texas), and The Newbeats, as well as distributing a few UK Pye Records artists such as Donovan. Pye distributed Hickory in the UK. Among the hits that Hickory had on the pop charts were those by Sue Thompson, Kris Jensen, Donovan, and The Newbeats.

== Hickory Records artists ==
- Ernest Ashworth
- Roy Acuff
- Glenn Barber
- Bill Carlisle
- Helen Carter
- Jim Chesnut
- Wilma Lee and Stoney Cooper
- The In-Crowd
- Mark Dinning
- Donovan
- Jimmy Elledge
- Don Everly
- Neal Ford and the Fanatics
- Frankie & Johnny
- Bob Gallion
- Don Gibson
- B.J. Hickman
- Frank Ifield
- Kris Jensen
- Bobby Lord
- Bob Luman
- Sandy Mason
- Joe Melson
- Barbara Mills
- Bob Moore
- Jim Mundy
- The Newbeats
- Mickey Newbury
- The Overlanders
- Rusty & Doug (prior to their Warner Records period)
- Randy and the Holidays
- Buffy Sainte-Marie
- Ruben Studdard
- The Sparkles
- Sue Thompson
- Leona Williams
- Gail Wynters
- Elliott Yamin

== Notable releases ==
- There's a Big Wheel by Wilma Lee & Stoney Cooper, released in 1959
- Fairytale by Donovan, released October 22, 1965
- Universal Soldier (written Buffy Sainte-Marie) by Donovan, released March 12, 1965
- The Real Donovan by Donovan, released September 1966
- Catch the Wind by Donovan, released March 12, 1965
- Colours by Donovan, released May 28, 1965
- You'll Need Somebody on Your Bond by Donovan, released November 1965
- To Try for the Sun by Donovan, released January 1966
- Josie by Donovan, released February 18, 1966
- Like It Is, Was, and Evermore Shall Be by Donovan, released April 1968
- A Girl For All Seasons by Gail Wynters, Hickory LPS 138
- Early Treasures by Donovan, released 1973
- Donovan P. Leitch by Donovan, released October 1970
- The Best of Donovan by Donovan, released November 1969
- What's Bin Did and What's Bin Hid by Donovan, released June 1965 as "Catch the Wind"
- The Very Best of Don Gibson (album), released 1973
- Louisiana Man by Rusty and Doug Kershaw, released 1974
- Back In The Country by Roy Acuff, released 1974
- Still Loving You by Bob Luman, released 1974
- Smoky Mountain Memories by Roy Acuff, released 1974
- The Girl I Love by Carl Smith, released 1975
- Snap Your Fingers by Don Gibson, released 1974
- Elliott Yamin by Elliott Yamin, released 2007
- Love Is by Ruben Studdard, released May 19, 2009
- Fight for Love by Elliott Yamin, released 2009

== See also ==
- List of record labels
