= Josie (Donovan song) =

Single by Donovan

from the album What's Bin Did and What's Bin Hid
- B-side: "Little Tin Soldier" (Shawn Phillips)
- Released: 18 February 1966 (UK)
- Recorded: 1965
- Genre: Folk
- Length: 3:28
- Label: Pye 7N17067
- Songwriter: Donovan
- Producers: Terry Kennedy, Peter Eden, Geoff Stephens

Donovan UK singles chronology
"Turquoise" (1965)	"Josie" (1966)	"Remember the Alamo" (1966)

"Josie" is a song written and recorded by British singer-songwriter Donovan.

== Background ==
The "Josie" single was backed with a cover of "The Little Tin Soldier" by Shawn Phillips and released in the United Kingdom on 18 February 1966 through Pye Records (Pye 7N 17067).

Like Hickory Records in the United States, it was clear by early 1966 that Pye Records retained the rights to the tracks Donovan recorded while recording at Pye. Unlike Hickory Records, however, Pye retained the right to release future Donovan albums and singles as stipulated by Donovan's original contract. Meanwhile, any new recordings from Donovan were legally barred from release.

As Hickory Records did with "You're Gonna Need Somebody on Your Bond" and "To Try for the Sun" in the United States, Pye Records took an album track and released it as a single without Donovan's consent. "Josie" was originally released on Donovan's debut album What's Bin Did and What's Bin Hid and was viewed as a single that could possibly sell well. Pye chose the Fairytale album track "The Little Tin Soldier" for the b-side. The "Josie" single became the first Donovan release to fail to chart in the United Kingdom, just as the "You're Gonna Need Somebody on Your Bond" and "To Try for the Sun" singles failed to chart in the United States.

Cash Box described it as a "pretty, sentimental ballad in a tradition-oriented folk vein."

== U.S. release ==
In the US, "Josie", was released as the B-side to Colours.
