= Fairytale (album) =

Studio album by Donovan
- Released: October 22, 1965 (UK); November 1965 (US)
- Recorded: September 1965
- Studios: Peer Music, Denmark Street, London
- Genre: Folk
- Length: 35:17
- Labels: Pye (UK); Hickory (US)
- Producers: Peter Eden; Geoff Stephens; Terry Kennedy

Donovan chronology
The Universal Soldier (1965)	Fairytale (1965)	Sunshine Superman (1966)

Singles from Fairytale
- 1. "Colours" b/w "To Sing for You" Released: 28 May 1965 (UK); 2. "Colours" b/w "Josie" Released: 2 July 1965 (US); 3. "To Try for the Sun" b/w "Turquoise" Released: January 1966 (US)

Fairytale is the second album from Scottish singer-songwriter Donovan. It was first released in the UK on 22 October 1965 through Pye Records (catalog number NPL 18128). The US version of Fairytale was released by Hickory Records (catalog number LPM 127 [monaural] / LPS 127 [stereo]) in November 1965 with a slightly different set of songs. Peter Eden, Geoff Stephens and Terry Kennedy produced the original album.

== History ==
Fairytale finds Donovan evolving his styles further towards British folk, especially on songs such as "Summer Day Reflection Song" and "Jersey Thursday". "Sunny Goodge Street" foreshadows the jazzy feel and descriptions of life in urban London that Donovan would continue to explore over the next two years. Like his previous album What's Bin Did and What's Bin Hid, Fairytale primarily features Donovan singing and playing mouth harp and acoustic guitar. Shawn Phillips is playing the extra twelve-string guitar.

For release in the US, Hickory Records added a cover of Buffy Sainte-Marie's "Universal Soldier" and removed a cover of Bert Jansch's "Oh Deed I Do". Donovan's recording of "Universal Soldier" was released in the US as a single the previous September, and was achieving some chart success, and "The Ballad of a Crystal Man" had previously appeared on his EP The Universal Soldier in August.

The Canadian pressing, issued on the British Pye label, omitted "Belated Forgiveness Plea" but included "Oh Deed I Do" and "Universal Soldier".

Record World said that the single "Sunny Goodge Street "has an elusive beauty" and that "the poetic images all ring true and the melody is simple."

== Reissues ==
- In January 1969, Fairytale was reissued in an edited form (Marble Arch Records MAL 867) in the UK. "Colours" and "The Little Tin Soldier" were both removed from the album.
- In February 1991, Castle Records reissued the UK version of Fairytale on compact disc (Castle CLACD226) in the UK.
- In 1996, Sequel Records reissued the US version of Fairytale on compact disc (Sequel 1004-2). The CD features seven bonus tracks. The first bonus track is a cover of Bert Jansch's "Oh Deed I Do". On the original US version of Fairytale "Oh Deed I Do" was cut and a cover of Buffy Sainte-Marie's "Universal Soldier" was added. The next three songs ("Do You Hear Me Now", "The War Drags On" and "The Ballad of a Crystal Man") are from Donovan's 1965 EP The Universal Soldier. "Turquoise" and "Hey Gyp (Dig the Slowness)" were originally released as Donovan's third UK single on 30 October 1965. The last bonus track is the single version of "Colours".
- On 19 February 2002, Sanctuary Records reissued the original UK version of Fairytale on compact disc. The CD features six bonus tracks. The first four bonus tracks were originally released 15 August 1965 in the UK on Donovan's Universal Soldier EP. That EP featured a different take of "The Ballad of a Crystal Man". The last two bonus tracks are both sides of Donovan's third single "Turquoise"/"Hey Gyp (Dig the Slowness)" released 30 October 1965 in the UK.
- On 22 February 2005, Silverline Records reissued the original UK version of Fairytale on DualDisc. The DualDisc has an identical track listing to the 2002 Sanctuary Records reissue.

== Cover versions ==
- British vocalist and songwriter Marianne Faithfull was the first to cover the song "Sunny Goodge Street" on her 1966 album, North Country Maid.
- American vocalist Judy Collins covered the song "Sunny Goodge Street" on her 1966 album, In My Life.
- American musician Lindsey Buckingham covered the song "To Try For The Sun" on his 2006 album Under the Skin.
- American jazz pianist Vince Guaraldi recorded a live version of "Sunny Goodge Street" in 1967 at the Old Town Theater in Los Gatos, California, later released on the album An Afternoon with the Vince Guaraldi Quartet (2011). (The song is mistitled "Autumn Leaves" on the release.)

Professional ratings
Review scores
Source	Rating
Allmusic	Original album
Allmusic	2002 reissue
Allmusic	2005 reissue
Encyclopedia of Popular Music	4/5 stars

== Track listing ==
=== Original album (UK) ===
Side 1

1. "Colours" (Donovan Leitch) – 2:11
2. "To Try for the Sun" (Leitch) – 3:36
3. "Sunny Goodge Street" (Leitch) – 2:55
4. "Oh Deed I Do" (Bert Jansch) – 2:00
5. "Circus of Sour" (Paul Bernath) – 1:50
6. "The Summer Day Reflection Song" (Leitch) – 2:11

Side 2

1. "Candy Man" (Traditional; arranged by Leitch) – 3:25
2. "Jersey Thursday" (Leitch) – 2:13
3. "Belated Forgiveness Plea" (Leitch) – 2:54
4. "The Ballad of a Crystal Man" (Leitch) – 3:50
5. "The Little Tin Soldier" (Shawn Phillips) – 3:02
6. "The Ballad of Geraldine" (Leitch) – 4:38

=== 1965 Hickory Records version (US) ===
1965 Hickory Records version (U.S.)

Side 1

1. "Universal Soldier" (Buffy Sainte-Marie) – 2:16
2. "To Try for the Sun" (Leitch) – 3:36
3. "Sunny Goodge Street" (Leitch) – 2:55
4. "Colours" (Leitch) – 2:44
5. "Circus of Sour" (Bernath) – 1:50
6. "Summer Day Reflection Song" (Leitch) – 2:11

Side 2

1. "Candy Man" (traditional; arranged by Leitch) – 3:25
2. "Jersey Thursday" (Leitch) – 2:13
3. "Belated Forgiveness Plea" (Leitch) – 2:54
4. "The Ballad of a Crystal Man" (Leitch) – 3:50
5. "The Little Tin Soldier" (Phillips) – 3:02
6. "The Ballad of Geraldine" (Leitch) – 4:38

=== 1996 Sequel Records version (US) ===
Track listing as on the 1965 Hickory Records version plus the following bonus tracks:

1. "Oh Deed I Do" (Jansch) – 2:08
2. "Do You Hear Me Now" (Jansch) – 1:51
3. "The War Drags On" (Mick Softley) – 3:44
4. "The Ballad of a Crystal Man" (Leitch) – 3:18
5. "Turquoise" (Leitch) – 3:34
6. "Hey Gyp (Dig the Slowness)" (Leitch) – 3:13
7. "Colours" (Leitch) – 2:46

=== 2002 Sanctuary Records/Castle Records version ===
2002 Sanctuary Records/Castle Records version slipcover.

Track listing as on the original UK version plus the following bonus tracks:

1. "Universal Soldier" (Sainte-Marie) – 2:15
2. "The Ballad of a Crystal Man" (Leitch) – 3:19
3. "The War Drags On" (Softley) – 3:44
4. "Do You Hear Me Now" (Jansch) – 1:50
5. "Turquoise" (Leitch) – 3:31
6. "Hey Gyp (Dig the Slowness)" (Leitch) – 3:08

== Personnel ==
- Donovan – banjo, guitar, harmonica, vocals
- Skip Alan (Alan Skipper) – drums
- Brian Locking – bass guitar
- Harold McNair – flute
- Shawn Phillips – guitar, twelve-string guitar
- Peter Eden – producer
- Terry Kennedy – producer
- Ren Grevatt – liner notes

== Charts ==
Weekly chart performance for Fairytale
Chart (1965–1966)	Peak position
Finnish Mitä Suomi Soittaa LPs Chart	5
UK Melody Maker Top Ten LPs	9
UK New Musical Express Best Selling LPs in Britain	10
UK Record Retailer LPs Chart	20
US Billboard Top LP's	85
US Cash Box Top 100 Albums	58
US Record World Top 100 LP's	49
West German Media Control Albums Chart	16
