= You'll Need Somebody on Your Bond =

Single by Blind Willie Johnson
- Released: 1930
- Recorded: New Orleans, Louisiana, December 11, 1929
- Genre: Gospel blues
- Length: 3:05
- Label: Columbia
- Songwriter: Traditional or Blind Willie Johnson

"You'll Need Somebody on Your Bond" (later titled "You're Gonna Need Somebody on Your Bond") is a gospel song that is attributed to both tradition and to gospel blues musician Blind Willie Johnson. Johnson first recorded the song in December 1930, although Delta blues musician Charley Patton recorded a similar "You're Gonna Need Somebody When You Die" in October 1929. Over the years, several other musicians have recorded renditions of the song.

== Blind Willie Johnson ==
Johnson sang the song on the streets of towns in Texas as both entertainment and a calling to adhere to the teachings of Jesus. As with many of his songs, "You'll Need Somebody on Your Bond" is performed with Johnson on lead vocals and slide guitar and an unknown female singer accompanying him on vocals. While it was first believed that his wife Angeline Johnson provided those backing vocals, it has since been refuted by Johnson's lead biographer. The second version, titled "You're Gonna Need Somebody on Your Bond" is nearly identical to the first, with slightly more subdued vocals and backing vocal provided by Willie B. Harris, sometimes considered to be Johnson's first wife.

Johnson recorded the first version of the song for Columbia Records as "You'll Need Somebody on Your Bond" on December 11, 1929, in New Orleans, Louisiana. He later recorded a second version titled "You're Gonna Need Somebody on Your Bond" on April 20, 1930, in Atlanta, Georgia, which was Johnson's last recorded song. The songs appear on several Johnson compilation albums – both are included on The Complete Blind Willie Johnson (1993).

== Buffy Sainte-Marie version ==
In 1964, Buffy Sainte-Marie recorded "You're Gonna Need Somebody on Your Bond" with slightly altered lyrics and included the song on her debut album, It's My Way!. While her debut album did not chart, it proved influential to both the American and British folk communities. Sainte-Marie recorded the song on acoustic guitar without using a slide and sang without any backup vocals.

== Donovan version ==
"You're Gonna Need Somebody on Your Bond"

Single by Donovan

from the album What's Bin Did and What's Bin Hid
- B-side: "The Little Tin Soldier"
- Released: November 1965 (US)
- Recorded: 1965
- Genre: Blues
- Length: 4:04
- Label: Hickory
- Songwriter: Traditional or Blind Willie Johnson
- Producers: Terry Kennedy; Peter Eden; Geoff Stephens

Donovan US singles chronology
"Universal Soldier" (1965)	"You're Gonna Need Somebody on Your Bond" (1965)	"To Try for the Sun" (1966)

Scottish singer-songwriter Donovan recorded "You're Gonna Need Somebody on Your Bond" in early 1965 for inclusion on his debut album What's Bin Did and What's Bin Hid. Since Donovan recorded a version of "Universal Soldier" after hearing it on Buffy Sainte-Marie's debut album, it is likely that he first heard "You're Gonna Need Somebody on Your Bond" from the same source. Hickory Records released "You're Gonna Need Somebody on Your Bond" backed with a cover of the song "The Little Tin Soldier" by Shawn Phillips, in November 1965 (Hickory 45–1375), but it did not appear in the singles chart.

== Other versions ==
Blues artists Roy Rogers and Norton Buffalo collaborated on a blues album, Travellin' Tracks, producing a remake of "You're Gonna Need Somebody on Your Bond", used for the TV series Dog the Bounty Hunter, S3E20 episode "Ticket to Ride", which first aired September 19, 2006.
