= Remember the Alamo (song) =

Folk song by Jane Bowers

"Remember the Alamo" is a song written by Texan folk singer and songwriter Jane Bowers. Bowers details the last days of 180 soldiers during the Battle of the Alamo and names several famous figures who fought at the Alamo, including Mexican general Santa Anna and Texans Jim Bowie, William Barrett Travis and Davy Crockett. It champions the Texans' efforts against Mexico to establish an independent republic.

Tex Ritter first released the song as the b-side of "Gunsmoke" in 1955. It was the first song in the catalogue of his and Johnny Bond's music company Vidor Publications. Ritter's recording was used in the film Down Liberty Road the following year. While the song was never a hit single and did not initially make a big impact on the folk community, it has since been covered by many important folk and country artists.

Members of the Western Writers of America chose it as one of the Top 100 Western songs of all time.

== Covers ==
=== The Kingston Trio's recording ===
The Kingston Trio met Jane Bowers while playing shows in Austin, Texas in the late 1950s. They went on to record several of her songs, including "Remember the Alamo". The song was released with slightly different lyrics on their 1959 album At Large, which subsequently reached No. 1 on the Billboard pop album charts in the United States.

=== Johnny Cash's recording ===
In the early 1960s Johnny Cash recorded "Remember the Alamo" with Tex Ritter's original lyrics. He also utilized different instrumentation from the Kingston Trio's version by adding a military drumbeat and lush backing vocals. The song was included on his 1963 album Ring of Fire: The Best of Johnny Cash which also reached No. 1 in the United States.

"Remember the Alamo"

Single by Donovan

from the album What's Bin Did and What's Bin Hid
- B-side: "The Ballad of a Crystal Man"
- Released: April 1966 (UK)
- Recorded: March 1965
- Genre: Folk
- Length: 3:04
- Label: Pye Records
- Songwriter: Jane Bowers
- Producers: Terry Kennedy, Peter Eden, Geoff Stephens

Donovan singles chronology
"Josie" (1966)	"Remember the Alamo" (1966)	"Sunshine Superman" (1966)

=== Willie Nelson's recording ===
Willie Nelson recorded the song for his 1968 concept album Texas in My Soul. This version is very similar to the one by Johnny Cash.

=== Donovan's recording ===
British singer-songwriter Donovan recorded "Remember the Alamo" with a mix of both Kingston Trio revised lyrics and Tex Ritter's original lyrics in early 1965 for inclusion on his debut album What's Bin Did and What's Bin Hid:

Although he had never visited the United States, Donovan was deeply interested in the American folk tradition. He stripped away all backing vocals, military drumbeats and militant guitar strumming and simply sang the song with an acoustic guitar as accompaniment. In early 1966, Donovan was still suffering from the legal battles between his original record label Pye Records and his new label Epic Records. During the dispute, Pye Records released "Josie" without Donovan's approval and the single failed to chart. Not long after, Pye Records culled "Remember the Alamo" from What's Bin Did and What's Bin Hid and prepared it for single release in the United Kingdom. The song was backed with "The Ballad of a Crystal Man" and released in April 1966 (Pye 7N 17088). The single was quickly withdrawn from the market not long after its release, ostensibly due to the ongoing contractual battles, and never charted.

=== John Otway and Wild Willy Barrett's recording ===
British musicians John Otway and Wild Willy Barrett recorded the song on their 1978 album Deep & Meaningless. The album was re-released in 2007. The version is a colourful one, with strangled singing, pounding drums and the sound of cannon. Unlike in other versions, the courier referred to in the third verse is a woman.

=== Asleep at the Wheel's recording ===
Texas Swing band Asleep at the Wheel released its version of the song in 2003 on Asleep at the Wheel Remembers The Alamo. Since the early 1970s this group has performed big band Western swing in the style of Bob Wills and The Texas Playboys, and has a devoted following in the US and the UK as well. The song is part of a theme album about the Battle of the Alamo, and includes traditional tunes ("Deguello", "The Yellow Rose of Texas") and more recent whimsical songs ("The Ballad of Davy Crockett", "Don't Go There"). "Remember the Alamo" is sung by longtime frontman Ray Benson, and the band performs the song in the traditional free and flowing Texas Swing style.
