= Turquoise (song) =

Single by Donovan
- B-side: "Hey Gyp (Dig the Slowness)"
- Released: 30 October 1965 (UK)
- Recorded: 1965
- Genre: Folk
- Length: 3:32 (Side A); 3:09 (Side B) (UK)
- Label: Pye 7N15984
- Songwriter: D Leitch
- Producers: Terry Kennedy, Peter Eden, Geoff Stephens

Donovan, UK singles chronology
"Colours" (1965)	"Turquoise" (1965)	"Josie" (1966)

"Turquoise" is a song written and recorded by Scottish singer-songwriter Donovan. The "Turquoise" single was released in the United Kingdom on 30 October 1965 through Pye Records (Pye 7N 15984) and charted, peaking at No.30. The "Turquoise" single was backed with "Hey Gyp (Dig the Slowness)" and only released in the United Kingdom. "Turquoise" was released as the b-side on "To Try for the Sun" in the United States.

"Turquoise" marked a significant drop-off in Donovan's UK chart success compared to the top 10 successes of "Catch the Wind" and "Colours" and The Universal Soldier EP. While "Catch the Wind" and "Colours" have appeared in various formats throughout Donovan's catalogue, live versions and re-recordings of "Turquoise" are conspicuously absent.

The relative lack of success in the United Kingdom was most likely the reason leading to Hickory Records selecting "You're Gonna Need Somebody on Your Bond" as Donovan's next single in the United States. Hickory Records later released "Turquoise" as the b-side to "To Try for the Sun" and made it the opening track to their 1966 compilation The Real Donovan. The 45 was one of the records in John Lennon's jukebox.

The song was written about Donovan's friend Joan Baez, with whom he claimed he was in love. Baez recorded a version of the song on her 1967 album Joan.

The lyric begins:

“Your smile beams like sunlight
On a gull’s wing; and the leaves
Dance and play after you;
Take my hand and hold it
As you would a flower;
Take care with my heart, Oh darling:
She’s made of glass.”

British group No-Man covered the song for the 1992 tribute album Island of Circles, released by the Nettwerk label. A slightly remixed version of this cover became the basis for an original song by the group called "Ocean Song", released that same year as a single by the One Little Indian Records label.
