= Brian Locking =

English musician (1938–2020)

- Also known as: Licorice Locking, Lic
- Born: 22 December 1938; Bedworth, Warwickshire, England
- Origin: Grantham, Lincolnshire, England
- Died: 8 October 2020 (aged 81) North Wales
- Genres: Rock and roll, rockabilly
- Occupations: Musician, songwriter
- Instruments: Bass guitar; double bass; harmonica; clarinet; piano
- Years active: 1956–1968
- Formerly of: The Wildcats (later called The Krew Kats); The Shadows; Cliff Richard; Vince Taylor & His Playboys

Brian "Licorice" Locking (22 December 1938 – 8 October 2020) was an English musician and songwriter. He is best known for being the bass player for The Shadows for sixteen months between 1962 and 1963. He was also in groups that served as the backing band for Vince Taylor, Adam Faith, Tommy Steele and Marty Wilde, and also worked as a session player with numerous artists including rock stars Gene Vincent, Eddie Cochran and Joe Brown, as well as Conway Twitty and Brenda Lee.

== Early life ==
Locking was born on 22 December 1938 in Bedworth, Warwickshire, England. He was born at home at 29 Mount Drive, and was delivered by his Aunt. His family moved to Grantham, Lincolnshire just over a year later. After leaving school, he worked as a fireman for British Rail.

== Career ==
=== The Vagabonds ===
Locking was influenced to play the harmonica after seeing Larry Adler on television. He taught himself how to play after borrowing his sisters plastic harmonica, and he soon formed a mouth organ duo with his friend Roy Clarke. They became "The Harmonica Vagabonds" after a third friend, Roy Taylor joined. Locking revealed in 2019 that his first paid gig was at a village in the early 1950s, where he played "Secret Love" by Doris Day, and afterwards was paid with "a packet of 20 cigarettes and two shillings and sixpence".

The Vagabonds dropped the harmonica act after skiffle became popular. Locking switched to a tea chest bass he made with Clark's mothers broom handle a bit of string from a post office, and the group got a residency at The 2i's Coffee Bar in Soho, London, where he was asked to tour with Terry Dene and with Vagabond member Roy Taylor, who was now singing under the name Vince Eager. He was then a member of The Playboys with guitarist Tony Sheridan and drummer Brian Bennett, who backed Vince Taylor.

=== The Wildcats ===
After The Playboys disbanded, Locking switched to electric bass guitar, and he and Bennett teamed up with guitarists Big Jim Sullivan and Tony Belcher and formed The Wildcats, who served as the backing band for Marty Wilde. While in the Wildcats, Locking received the nickname "Licorice" when he was seventeen after he played a toy clarinet (which was also known by the name "Licorice stick") on a tour bus in Boston, Lincolnshire. When Marty Wilde parted company from The Wildcats, they changed their name to "the Krew Kats" and recorded instrumentals with modest success. Bennett then left to join the Shadows.

=== The Shadows ===
In April 1962, whilst having just started performing with Adam Faith and finished touring with Tommy Steele, at Bennett's suggestion, Locking was himself invited to join The Shadows to replace the departing bassist Jet Harris. Locking played on some of their best known tracks, including "Dance On!", "Foot Tapper" and "Atlantis". He also played the harmonica in live shows and on his signature album track, "Dakota". He appeared in the 1963 Cliff Richard film, Summer Holiday.

After being in the Shadows for only eighteen months, Locking left to pursue his activities with the Jehovah's Witnesses. He was replaced with John Rostill. Locking briefly returned to The Shadows five years later to tour with the band in 1968 after Rostill fell ill. In the 1990s, he appeared regularly as a guest at Bruce Welch's Shadowmania fan events at Lakeside Country Club in Surrey, and was also frequently invited to perform with various Shadows-style bands and was fundamental to honouring their legacy in such countries as France and Germany.

=== Later career ===
He remained on the music scene at a more compatible pace and was invited to play double bass on Donovan's first recording session. Locking largely retired from music afterwards. In later life Locking was a regular guest playing at Shadows guitar clubs across the UK and abroad. In 1998, he performed at the Pipeline Instrumental Convention in London alongside other former members of The Shadows under the band name Local Heroes. He reprised his role in the Wildcats at Marty Wilde's 50th Anniversary Concert, where he also appeared on stage with all the surviving Shadows members.

== Personal life and death ==
Locking moved to Wales and worked in retail and as a window cleaner. He sang in the local Denbigh and District Male Voice Choir.

Brian Locking suffered from Bell's palsy, and he was registered blind. He died in a hospice in North Wales on 8 October 2020 aged 81, after having been diagnosed with a tumour on the bladder. In 2022, Locking's sister published a book about his experience in The Shadows.
