= Shawn Phillips =

American singer-songwriter (born 1943)

- Phillips in 2006

Background information
- Born: February 3, 1943 (age 83); Fort Worth, Texas, U.S.
- Genre: Folk rock
- Occupation: Musician
- Instruments: Guitar; vocals; sitar
- Years active: 1960s–present

Shawn Phillips (born February 3, 1943) is an American singer-songwriter and musician, primarily influential in the 1960s and 1970s. His work is rooted in folk rock but straddles other genres, including jazz fusion and funk. Phillips has recorded 32 albums and worked with musicians including Donovan, Paul Buckmaster, J. Peter Robinson, Eric Clapton, Steve Winwood, Bernie Taupin, Tim Hardin, Manos Hatzidakis and many others.

Rock impresario Bill Graham described the Texas-born musician as "the best kept secret in the music business". Phillips' AllMusic biography states: "His refusal to pigeonhole his music – which seamlessly melds folk, rock, jazz, funk, progressive, pop, electro, classical, and global folk traditions – to meet anyone else's expectations allowed him to retain his cult following without ever achieving the stardom that his talent seemed to merit."

== Biography ==
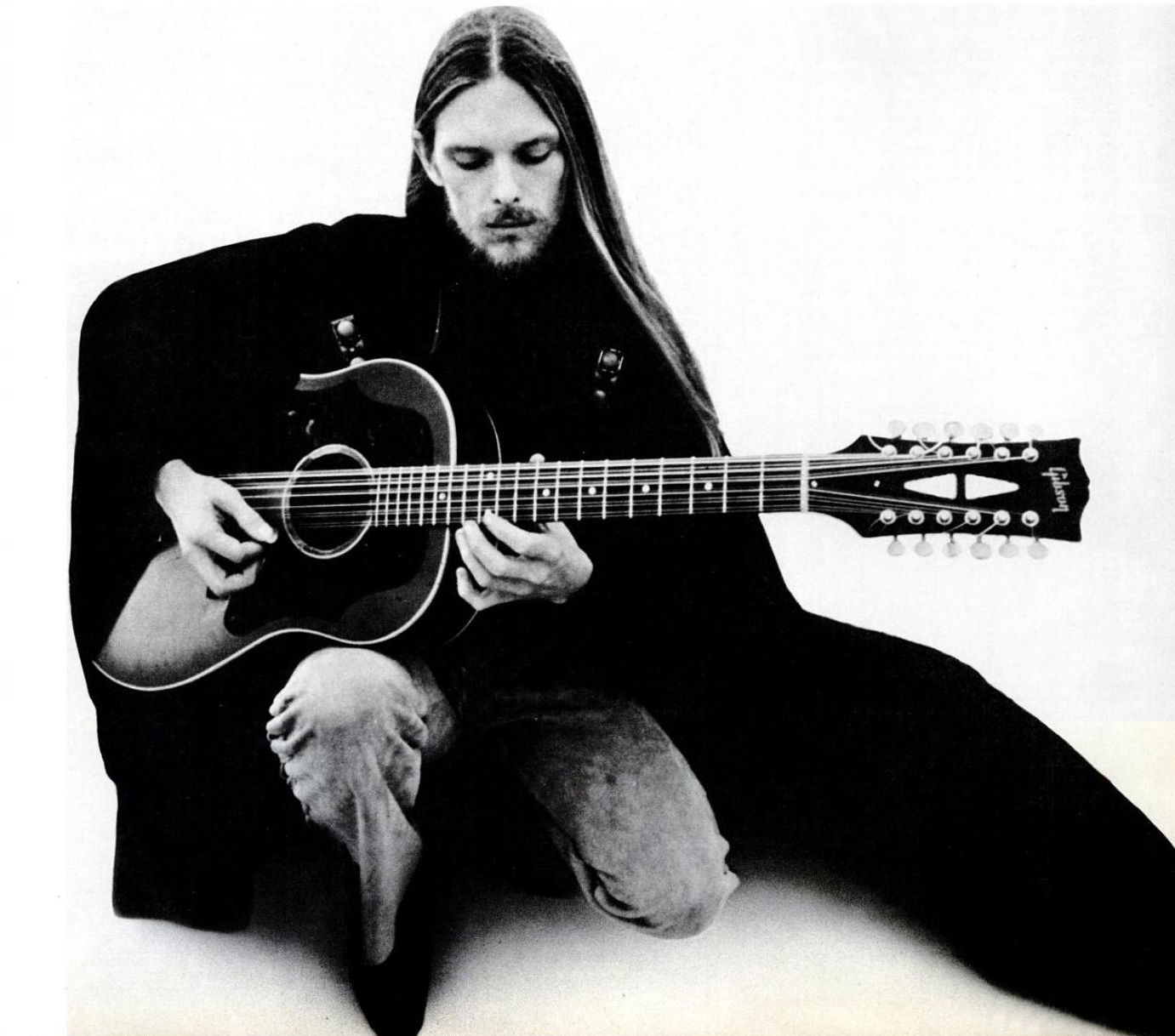
Phillips in 1971

Phillips was born in Fort Worth, Texas, the son of James Atlee Phillips, writer of spy novels under the pseudonym of Philip Atlee, and nephew of CIA officer David Atlee Phillips. He grew up in various locations around the world, including Tahiti, and learned to play guitar as a child. He returned to live in Texas in the late 1950s, and, after a time in the U.S. Navy, moved to California.

He played in folk clubs in the early 1960s, alongside singer-songwriter Tim Hardin, comedian Lenny Bruce, and others, and when in Saskatoon, Canada, met and taught guitar techniques to aspiring singer Joni Anderson (later Mitchell). He recorded his first single, an adaptation of Bob Gibson's version of "Frankie and Johnnie" (credited as "The New Frankie & Johnnie Song"), in 1964. While traveling to India, he stopped in London and met record producer Denis Preston, who signed him to Columbia Records. Phillips released two albums on the label, I'm a Loner (1965) and Shawn (1966), though neither was successful. During this period, Phillips also met Donovan. The pair ultimately collaborated on several songs, including "Season of the Witch", for which Phillips claimed in later interviews to have composed the music. Phillips also appeared on several of Donovan's albums, including Fairytale (on which Phillips is credited as writer of "Little Tin Soldier"), Sunshine Superman, and Mellow Yellow. Through Donovan, he met The Beatles and contributed backing vocals on "Lovely Rita". He is also credited with teaching George Harrison his first lessons on the sitar.

In 2011, Philips rejoined Donovan at the Royal Albert Hall in London for a reunion of the Sunshine Superman album, featuring guest star Jimmy Page.

Phillips played the character Paul Taylor in the 1966 film Run with the Wind, which he also wrote songs for.

In 1967, Phillips left England after his work permit expired. After a period in Paris, he moved to Positano in Italy, while continuing to tour. Phillips returned to England to write and perform with The Djinn, the music for the controversial Jane Arden play Vagina Rex and the Gas Oven at the Arts Laboratory on Drury Lane in London in February 1969. Sponsored by Dick James, he also recorded material with Steve Winwood, Jim Capaldi and Chris Wood of Traffic. This was intended to become a trilogy of albums, combining songs together with instrumental pieces and verse readings. He was signed by A&M Records, but they decided to release only one album, comprising only Phillips' songs, which was released as Contribution (1970). The album, which ranged from folk rock to "introspective quasi-classical guitar pieces" was relatively successful, and Phillips released a string of further albums on A&M through the 1970s, starting with Second Contribution (1970), and Collaboration (1971).

The song with which he is most widely associated is "She Was Waiting For Her Mother At The Station In Torino And You Know I Love You Baby But It's Getting Too Heavy To Laugh", more commonly known as "Woman", from the Second Contribution album.

Phillips continued to tour and secured a double standing ovation for his impromptu solo performance in front of 657,000 people at the 1970 Isle of Wight Festival. He was also approached to be the lead in the Broadway production of Jesus Christ Superstar, and started rehearsing the show, but withdrew because of contractual disagreements with the show's producer, Robert Stigwood. He recorded successfully throughout the 1970s, with four of his albums – Faces (1972; No. 57), Bright White (1973; No. 72), Furthermore (1974; No. 50), and Do You Wonder (1975; No. 101) – reaching the Billboard pop LP chart in the U.S. In addition, the singles "Lost Horizon" (No. 63) and "We" (No. 92) appeared on the Billboard Hot 100 chart in 1973.

According to Bruce Eder at Allmusic, his 1970s recordings "established his reputation for boundless, nearly peerless creativity and virtuosity... [as a] 12-string guitarist combined with his four-octave vocal range.....Writers lavished praise on Phillips for his unusual lyrics, haunting melodies, daunting musicianship, and the ambition of his records. He was a complete enigma, American-born but raised internationally, with a foreigner's keen appreciation for all the music of his homeland and a seasoned traveler's love of world music, with none of the usual limits on his thinking about music." Eder continued: "Phillips never achieved major stardom, despite his critical accolades. He never courted an obvious commercial sound, preferring to write songs that, as he put it, 'make you feel different from the way you felt before you started listening,' primarily love songs and sonic landscapes."

Later in the 1970s, Phillips began experimenting with jazz and funk music. using electronic keyboards, sequencers, and computers. He moved to RCA Records, and released Transcendence (1978), produced by Michael Kamen, on which he hired Herbie Hancock's band The Headhunters to fill out the album with instrumental jam. The album was dropped nine months after its release. He also composes music for movies. After moving from Italy back to Los Angeles in 1978, he self-produced and financed by Clancy Grass the independent release Beyond Here Be Dragons in 1983 with musicians including Alphonso Johnson, Caleb Quaye, J. Peter Robinson, and Ralph Humphrey; the album was released in 1988 by an independent distributor.

Phillips semi-retired from music in the early 1990s and certified as an Emergency Medical Technician (EMT), a Firefighter in Spicewood, TX. He moved to Port Elizabeth, South Africa in 2003 with his wife Juliette and worked as a Sea Rescue Volunteer with the National Sea Rescue Institute. His album No Category, containing a mix of new and unreleased music featuring his longtime collaborators Paul Buckmaster, Leland Sklar, and Peter Robinson, was released in 2002. On June 6, 2006, the Nashville Symphony Orchestra performed the suite "Disturbing Horizons: Events in the Life of a Prince" comprising nine of Phillips' classical compositions. In 2007, his first live album, Living Contribution, was released, along with a live DVD of the same title. His A&M recordings were reissued on CD during the 1990s by Wounded Bird Records, together with several compilations of his work.

In 1994, Phillips toured South Africa with his manager Arlo Hennings. They were the first Americans to tour post-apartheid South Africa. The sold-out tour led to two more sold-out tours. Phillips' South Africa record label released the compilation CD Another Contribution in 1995 to honor the tours. Phillips also met his future wife in South Africa.

Since 2016, Phillips has resided in Louisville, Kentucky, with Juliette and their son, Liam. He now divides his time between writing, recording, touring, and his EMT work.

Of his EMT work, he says:

“One of my EMT calls was an 89-year-old woman named Clara, who had fractured her pelvis from stepping out of bed too hard. I took a great deal of care to keep her from suffering before we transferred to Austin EMS. I said to her, ‘We’re gonna give you over to these guys, but you’re in very good hands.’ She was very frightened. As I left, she grabbed me by the arm, looked me in the eyes, and said, ‘Thank you so much for taking care of me.’ And the music business just disappeared into the distance. I got a double standing ovation in front of 657,000 people at the Isle of Wight in the 1970s. You can imagine the rush. But that moment with Clara was much more powerful, because that work is immediate. It’s as real as you can get.”

In an interview with Chicago music critic Scott Itter, Phillips was reminded that he had once been described as "the best kept secret in the music business" by the late rock impresario Bill Graham. Asked why he was still "a secret" to many people, Phillips replied:

I'm not that interested in the fame, and popularity, but I would like to have the money that comes with it. I suppose the two have to go hand in hand. My "secrecy" is simply because none of the companies I have ever been affiliated with have cared enough to hire a national PR firm on an annual basis as part of the machine that creates the fame and popularity. Also, if you use a word like xenophobia in a song, or any word that the general public has to look up, they tend to shy away from any semblance of intelligence in popular music.

A documentary series about Phillips' life and works has been in production since 2015, from filmmakers Alex Wroten and Lindsey Wolfe-Wroten of Well Dang! Productions. The six-part docuseries features interviews with Phillips, Donovan, Paul Buckmaster, J. Peter Robinson, Poli Palmer, Jim Cregan, Jonathan Weston, Leland Sklar, Arlo Hennings (Phillips' manager for 18 years); it is expected to premiere sometime soon.

== Spirituality ==
As can be evidenced throughout his lyrics, Shawn was undoubtedly a very spiritual man throughout the 1970s; it is suggested that Phillips' spirituality has never left him. Indeed, he remarked in an interview how: ‘Everything I write is guided by a spiritual experience that I once had when I was in my early 20s. This was not a vision; it was an organic, instantaneous physical state of being that changed my life and my entire existence.’

Although there is no avert allegiance to any group or ’Way’, Phillips' songs seem to suggest very clearly -and very enthusiastically, the Spiritual/nondual Realisation. In Second Contribution’s ‘Song for Sagittarians’ for example, he sang how: ‘And it's brighter than the Sunlight, Purer than the moonlight! And it's drawing me towards it -Like the moth out of the night!.. And I know I’ll arrive -where there ain't no time, -non-conventional plane of joy, sublime!…’

Phillips also shows this enthusiasm and encouragement for 'enlightenment' in every song; an example the whole lyrics of Second Contribution.

He also talks of it as part-and-parcel of his life.

== Family and personal life ==
Before moving to Louisville, Kentucky in 2016 with his wife, Juliette, and then-12-year-old son Liam (named after his younger brother), Phillips lived in Italy and in South Africa.

Phillips's uncle, David Atlee Phillips, was a top CIA officer who was associated with the assassin Lee Harvey Oswald.

== Discography ==
=== Studio albums ===
- I'm a Loner (1965) [re-issued in Canada as Favourite Things]
- Shawn (1966) Columbia Records [re-issued in Canada as First Impressions]
- Contribution (1970)
- Second Contribution (1970) US No. 208, Canada No. 68
- Collaboration (1971)
- Faces (1972) US No. 57, Canada No. 38
- Bright White (1973) US No. 72, Canada No. 50
- Furthermore (1974), A&M Records US No. 50, Canada No. 56
- Do You Wonder (1974) US No. 101, Canada No. 42
- Rumplestiltskin's Resolve (1975) US No. 201
- Spaced (1977)
- Transcendence (1978) RCA Records
- Favourite Things (1987) Capitol Records
- Beyond Here Be Dragons (1988)
- The Truth If It Kills (1994)
- No Category (2002) Universal Records / Fat Jack Records
- Reflections (2012)
- Perspective (2013)
- Infinity (2014)
- Continuance (2017)

=== Live albums ===
- Living Contribution: Both Sides (2007) Sheer Sound
- At the BBC (2009) Hux Records
- Live in the Seventies (2022) Think Like A Key Music
- Outrageous (2024) [with Peter Robinson] Think Like A Key Music

=== Greatest hits ===
- Best of Shawn Phillips (1990)
- The Best of Shawn Phillips: The A&M Years (1992)
- Another Contribution: Anthology (1995)
- Contribution/Second Contribution (2004)

=== Singles ===
- "A Christmas Song" (1970, A&M AMS-819)
- "We" (US #89, 1972, A&M 1402)
- "Lost Horizon" (US #63, #20 CAN-AC), 1973, A&M 1405)
- "Anello (Where Are You)" (1973, A&M 1435)
- "Bright White" (1973, A&M 1482) (#62 Canada)
- "Do You Wonder" (1974, A&M 1750) (#89 Canada)

=== Collaborations ===
- 1965 – Fairytale by Donovan: 12-string guitar on "Summer Day Reflection Song" and "Jersey Thursday", wrote "The Little Tin Soldier"
- 1966 – Sunshine Superman by Donovan: sitar on 6 songs and co-wrote "Season Of The Witch" but was not credited
- 1967 – Mellow Yellow by Donovan: sitar on "Sunny South Kensington"
- 1969 – If Only For A Moment by Blossom Toes: guitar and sitar
- 1970 – Into The Fire by Wynder K. Frog: co-wrote, played guitar and sang on "Eddie's Tune"
- 1971 – Taupin by Bernie Taupin: co-wrote "To a Grandfather", "Today's Hero", "Ratcatcher" and "The Visitor"; played sitar, acoustic and electric 6 & 12 string guitars, koto and vocals
- 1971 – Say No More by Linda Lewis: guitar
- 1971 – Gilbert Montagné by Gilbert Montagné: guitar
- 1972 - Suàn/Naus by Armando Piazza: bass, fuzz-bass, guitar
- 1973 – New York Rock by Michael Kamen: co-wrote "Hot as the Sun" and "Indian Summer"
- 1980 – Cosmic Debris by Cosmic Debris: guitar, synthesizer and engineering
- 1981 – Keys by Light: vocals on "It's For You Part I" and "It's For You Part II"
