= Peter Eden =

British record producer and executive (born 1943)

- Born: 1943 (age 82–83); Hadleigh, Essex, England
- Occupations: Record producer, A&R man, record label executive, record store owner
- Years active: 1960s–present

Peter Eden (born 1943) is a British former record producer and record label executive, best known for his work in the mid-1960s with Donovan, and later with jazz musicians such as John Surman.

== Biography ==
Eden was born in Hadleigh, Essex. In his teens, he became the drummer in the New Deal Skiffle Group, and then in local groups the Colin Dale Combo and The Problems. He turned professional in the early 1960s, and became a backing musician for such singers as Susan Maughan and Mike Sarne. After his group split up, he helped run the Studio Club at Westcliff-on-Sea, and managed local R&B band The Cops’n’Robbers.

The band's singer, Brian 'Smudger' Smith, suggested to Eden that a friend, Scottish folk singer Donovan Leitch, who had returned from busking in Europe, should perform between the band's club sets. Eden liked Donovan's songs, and agreed with local songwriter Geoff Stephens that they should manage him and produce his records. Through Stephens' contacts, Donovan appeared on Ready Steady Go!, launching his career. Donovan was signed by Pye Records, and Eden co-produced his first single, "Catch the Wind", which reached number 4 on the UK Singles Chart in 1965, and the albums What's Bin Did and What's Bin Hid and Fairytale. However, Donovan's partnership with Eden and Stephens ended in late 1965.

Initially in partnership with Stephens, Eden continued to work as an independent producer and adviser with Pye, EMI and Decca. In the mid and late 1960s, he produced records by Vernon Haddock's Jubilee Lovelies, Mick Softley, Bill Fay, The Crocheted Doughnut Ring, Dr. K's Blues Band, Mike Cooper, and traditional singer Bob Davenport, among others. He had a particular interest in British jazz music, and started promoting it within the progressive music scene and in British colleges, working with musicians such as John Surman, Mike Gibbs, Mike Westbrook, Mike Osborne, Norma Winstone, and Alan Skidmore. Jazz critic Duncan Heining commented that Eden "was responsible for some 18 key British jazz releases of the late 60s and early 70s. It was through Eden [that] artists such as John Warren, Mike Gibbs, Mike Osborne, John Taylor and Norma Winstone got to record in their own right." Many of Eden's jazz productions were issued on the Deram and Dawn labels, the "progressive" subsidiaries of Decca and Pye respectively.

In 1969, while still helping to run the Dawn label at the time of Mungo Jerry's success on the label, Eden set up his own independent label, Turtle Records, releasing three progressive jazz albums by Mike Osborne, John Taylor, and Howard Riley. Though the albums sold poorly at the time, they are now highly regarded and collectable. Increasingly disillusioned with the recording industry, Eden scaled down his music business involvement, and started to run his own record store in Southend-on-Sea. He continued to manage and produce the folk-rock band Heron, and undertook other occasional production work, including in 1974 the album Milky Way Moses by Finnish band Tasavallan Presidentti. Working for Sonet Records, he was involved in the English version of Sylvia's hit "Y Viva España", and produced singles by Brett Marvin and the Thunderbolts. Also in the mid-1970s, Eden wrote and produced the music and stories for the children's television series Animal Kwackers, occasionally appearing in costume on the show as the drummer, Bongo.

From the late 1970s, Eden worked full time at his record store in Southend. He helped put together bands in the town, and curated the compilation album, The Best Of British Rockabilly Volume 1 (Anything They Can Bop, We Can Bop Better!), as well as two compilations of Southend Rock.
