= Jane Bowers =

American singer-songwriter

Jane Bowers (May 29, 1921 – June 18, 2000) was a Texas folk singer and songwriter best known for her composition "Remember the Alamo". Many of her songs were primarily recorded by the Kingston Trio.

== Selected songs ==
- "Buddy Better Get on Down the Line" (credited with Dave Guard)
- "Coast of California" (credited with Dave Guard)
- "El Matador" (credited with Irving Burgess)
- "Remember the Alamo"
- "San Miguel"
- "Sea Fever"
- "Señora" (credited with Dave Guard)
- "Speckled Roan"
- "To Be Redeemed"
- "When I Was Young" (credited with Dave Guard)
