= Universal Soldier (song) =

1964 single

Song by Buffy Sainte-Marie

from the album It's My Way!
- Released: April 1964
- Genre: Folk rock
- Length: 2:17
- Label: Vanguard
- Songwriter: Buffy Sainte-Marie
- Producer: Maynard Solomon

"Universal Soldier" is a song written by singer-songwriter Buffy Sainte-Marie. The first released recording was a single by The Highwaymen, released in September 1963. The song was also released on Sainte-Marie's debut album It's My Way!, in April 1964. "Universal Soldier" was not an immediate popular hit at the time of its release, but it did garner attention within the contemporary folk music community. It became a hit in 1965 when Donovan covered it on his EP of the same name, also charting for Glen Campbell that same year. Sainte-Marie said: "I wrote 'Universal Soldier' in the basement of The Purple Onion coffee house in Toronto in the early sixties. It's about individual responsibility for war and how the old feudal thinking kills us all." The premise of the song is that politicians, with power over the military, in democratic states are elected by the people.

Sainte-Marie said she was on a late night layover at San Francisco International Airport in 1963, when injured American troops – from the CIA's Special Activities Division and the Green Berets, covertly fighting in the still unannounced US direct engagement in the Vietnam War – were passing through, inspiring her to immediately start working on the song. She approached writing the song from the perspective of a student writing an essay for a professor who didn't see eye-to-eye with her perspective, hoping to present him with a different point of view.

== Composition ==
In the six verses of the song, soldiers of different heights, ages, religious and political backgrounds are depicted, fighting in different times, for different countries and with different motives, all thinking that they are fighting for peace but never realizing that they are part of the problem. The song ends with:

He's the Universal Soldier
and he really is to blame.
His orders come from far away no more.
They come from him and you and me,
and brothers, can't you see
this is not the way to put an end to war.

(Donovan sang "...from here and there and you and me")

Sainte-Marie sold the publishing rights to the song, but later bought them back for $25,000.

== Donovan cover ==
"Universal Soldier"

Single by Donovan

from the EP The Universal Soldier
- Released: August 13, 1965
- Genre: Folk rock
- Length: 2:16
- Label: Pye (NEP 24219)
- Songwriter: Buffy Sainte-Marie
- Producers: Terry Kennedy; Peter Eden; Geoff Stephens

Donovan US singles chronology
"Colours" (1965)	"Universal Soldier" (1965)	"You're Gonna Need Somebody on Your Bond" (1966)

By 1965, the song had caught the attention of budding folk singer Donovan, who recorded it using a similar arrangement to Buffy Sainte-Marie's original recording. In Donovan's version, Dachau became Liebau (Lubawka, Poland), a training center for Hitler Youth. Donovan's recording was released on an EP titled The Universal Soldier in the United Kingdom (August 15, 1965).

The lack of interest in the EP format within the United States led Hickory Records to release the song as a single in September 1965. Donovan's cover of "Universal Soldier" was backed with another track from the British EP: Bert Jansch's "Do You Hear Me Now?". Donovan's US release of "Universal Soldier" also became a hit, charting higher than his previous single "Colours" and ultimately reaching No. 53 on the Billboard charts and No. 21 in Canada, co-charting with Glen Campbell's version. This success led Hickory Records to include the song on the United States release of Donovan's second album, Fairytale, replacing a cover of Bert Jansch's "Oh Deed I Do". Cash Box described it as "a plaintive, twangy, medium-paced message-song which takes a strong anti-war stand."

Sainte-Marie was glad that Donovan's success with this song got more people to hear it.

== Depeche Mode cover ==
English electronic music band Depeche Mode recorded a cover version of "Universal Soldier" as part of the War Child charity project Help(2). The album, produced by James Ford, was released on March 6, 2026.

== Other covers ==
- Glen Campbell, 1965 (#45 US, #16 AUS, #4 SWE, #21 CAN)
- Hector, 1966, lyrics in Finnish, called "Palkkasoturi" ("The Mercenary", #1 FIN)
- Lobo, 1974, on his album Just a Singer
- Boudewijn de Groot, lyrics in Dutch, called "De eeuwige soldaat" ("The Eternal Soldier"), 1965, released as a B-side for Een meisje van 16

== Response ==
In 1965, Jan Berry of Jan and Dean released as a single an answer song presenting the opposite point of view, titled "The Universal Coward", which criticized anti-war protesters. Dean Torrence objected and did not participate.

== See also ==
- List of anti-war songs
