= To Try for the Sun =

- Original Hickory 45-1402

Single by Donovan

from the album Fairytale
- B-side: "Turquoise" (US)
- Released: January 1966 (US)
- Genre: Folk
- Length: 2:44 (Side A); 3:31 (Side B)
- Label: Hickory 45-1402 (US)
- Songwriter(s): Donovan
- Producer(s): Terry Kennedy, Peter Eden, Geoff Stephens

Donovan singles chronology
| "You're Gonna Need Somebody on Your Bond" (1965) | "To Try for the Sun" (1966) | "Josie" (1966) |

"To Try for the Sun" is a song written and recorded by Scottish singer-songwriter Donovan. The "To Try for the Sun" single was backed with "Turquoise" and released in the United States in January 1966 through Hickory Records (Hickory 45–1402).

In the midst of Donovan's contractual dispute between Pye Records and Epic Records, Donovan lost creative control over Pye releases in the United States. Donovan's Pye Records distributor Hickory Records decided against releasing Donovan's fourth single "Turquoise" and instead released the previously released album track "You're Gonna Need Somebody on Your Bond". Record World reviewed the single, calling it a "rebellious folk tune about youthful spirit" and "a pretty ballad from the English poetaster." The song became the first Donovan single to fail to chart in the United States.

The song is about his early days in Hatfield, Hertfordshire, with his friend Gypsy Dave.

By early 1966, it was becoming clear that Epic Records maintained control of all new Donovan releases in the United States. Hickory Records retained the right to release any of Donovan's Pye Records recordings and would subsequently release singles and albums in competition with the Epic Records catalog. Before the appearance of any new Epic Records material, however, Hickory Records released "To Try for the Sun". The song had previously appeared on Fairytale and even when backed with the unreleased British single "Turquoise", the song failed to chart.

== Covers ==
- A 1967 cover by The Kingston Trio appears on The Lost 1967 Album: Rarities Vol. 1.
- A 1967 cover by The Leaves appears on All The Good That's Happening.
- A 2006 cover by Lindsey Buckingham appears on Under the Skin.
