= Mick Softley =

English folk singer-songwriter and guitarist (1939–2017)

- Born: Michael Softley; 26 September 1939; South Woodford, Essex, England
- Died: 1 September 2017 (aged 77) Enniskillen, County Fermanagh, Northern Ireland
- Genres: Folk
- Occupation: Musician
- Instrument: Guitar
- Years active: Early 1960s–2017
- Labels: Columbia, Doll

Michael Softley (26 September 1939 – 1 September 2017) was an English singer-songwriter and guitarist. A figurehead during the British folk scene, Softley set up his own folk club, released three albums and worked with performers such as Mac MacLeod, Donovan, and Maddy Prior. Donovan covered two of Softley's songs ("Goldwatch Blues" and "The War Drags On") in 1965. Dave Berry also covered two of Softley's songs ("Walk Walk Talk Talk" and "I Love You Baby") in 1966.

== Early life ==
Born at Danbury Palace Emergency Maternity Hospital, South Woodford, Softley grew up in Essex near Epping Forest. His mother was of Irish origin (from County Cork) and his father had East Anglian tinker roots, going back to a few generations. Softley first took up trombone in school and became interested in traditional jazz. He was later persuaded to become a singer by one of his school teachers, and this led to him listening to Big Bill Broonzy and promptly changed his attitude to music, to the extent of him buying a mail-order guitar and some tutorial books and teaching himself to play.

By 1959, Mick Softley had left his job and home and spent time travelling around Europe on his motorbike, with a friend, Mike Rippingale. He ended up in Paris, where he came into the company of musicians such as Clive Palmer, Ramblin' Jack Elliott, and Wizz Jones. Here he improved his guitar skills and spent time busking with friends until his return to England in the early 1960s. He set up a folk club at The Spinning Wheel in Hemel Hempstead.

== Songs for Swingin' Survivors ==
Softley began singing in 'The Cock', a pub in St Albans, which was a hang out for beatniks and hippies and attracted musicians up from London. Informal sessions were common. This was where he met a young Donovan Leitch, to whom he taught cross-picking guitar techniques. (Leitch later cited Softley as a "major influence").

Donovan was soon snapped up by a record label and shot to stardom, but this enabled him to bring Softley to the attention of producers and record companies. His first release was the 1965 single "I'm So Confused", released by Immediate Records.

He went on to work with Peter Eden and Geoff Stephens, and his debut album Songs For Swinging Survivors, which was a purely folk record. The album featured only Softley and his acoustic guitar and includes the songs "The War Drags On" (covered by Donovan on his The Universal Soldier EP), and Softley's own interpretations of Billie Holiday's "Strange Fruit", and Woody Guthrie's "The Plains of the Buffalo".

In 1964 he opened a folk club, in the Spinning Wheel restaurant in Hemel Hempstead. It was shut down by the police after only a year, however, for "various reasons", mainly health and safety; a very small basement room, with only one way in (and out). Softley did not look back on this time favourably claiming during production he had gone "through a lot of hells and no heavens, a terrifying amount of personal pain" to the extent that he quit the music business for over four years. During this time he survived as a market trader in Hemel Hempstead, fathered two children, in 1963 and 1964, and still played gigs frequently in folk clubs around the south east. He returned to life on the road in 1968. Due to contractual issues he never received any royalties in the later years.

== Sunrise and Street Singer ==
After his absence, Softley returned with an electric group, Soft Cloud, Loud Earth. The group was soon trimmed down to a duo consisting of Softley and Mac MacLeod called Soft Cloud. They only performed a few times before they split up and Softley went on to pursue a solo career. Meeting Donovan again, he was persuaded to record for a second time. This time Tony Cox was on board for production and Softley claimed that "everybody all along the line was really good. Totally different to what I'd been through five years before – No-one was trying to make a fast penny out of me, and they were prepared to let me do everything exactly how I wanted to". Softley recorded three albums during this period, which have a different tone from the first album, due to the variety of instruments and styles showcased on these albums, from upbeat rock ("Can You Hear Me Now?") and folk ("Goldwatch Blues") to eastern-inspired sitar pieces ("Love Colours") and skiffle ("Ragtime Mama"). In 1971 he performed on French television programme Grande Affiche.

== Later years ==
Avoiding capitalising on the opportunity of stardom, Softley continued to travel and play for free, preferring to watch people enjoy his music than make money. He moved to County Fermanagh, Northern Ireland, in 1984, eventually settling in Enniskillen. He was a well recognised character in the town and he also performed occasionally at the Belfast Folk Festival. In later years he has concentrated on writing poetry, some of which has been published.

In 2011, Softley suffered a head injury after being knocked off his bicycle, and spent a considerable time in hospital recovering. In an effort to counter the unfounded rumours of his death, a Facebook page was set up and amassed a following of over 1,000 friends. In August 2011, an evening of entertainment featuring Softley's music and poetry was held in Cafe Merlot in Enniskillen, with all proceeds being donated to the brain injury unit at Altnagelvin Hospital.

== Death ==
Softley died on 1 September 2017, aged 77.

== Albums ==
- Songs For Swingin' Survivors (1965), Columbia – reissued on CD in 2003 by Hux Records and as part of The Eve Folk Recordings CD (2014)
- Sunrise (1970), CBS
- Street Singer (1971), CBS
- C'est la Fête à Malataverne (1971), Expression Spontanée – one track, "Time Machine" record live in French folk festival
- Any Mother Doesn't Grumble (1972), CBS
- Capital (1976), Doll Records
- Mensa (1978), Doll Records
- War Memorials (1985), Doll Records

Note: Sunrise and Street Singer were reissued as a two-CD set on BGO Records, 2009
