= Colours (Donovan song) =

1965 single by Donovan

- Dutch (Pye / Negram) sleeve

Single by Donovan

from the album Fairytale
- B-side: "To Sing for You"
- Released: 28 May 1965
- Recorded: 5 May 1965
- Studio: Southern Music, London
- Genre: Folk
- Length: 2:44
- Label: Pye
- Songwriter: Donovan Leitch
- Producers: Terry Kennedy; Peter Eden; Geoff Stephens

Donovan UK singles chronology
"Catch the Wind" (1965)	"Colours" (1965)	"Turquoise" (1965)

Donovan US singles chronology
"Catch the Wind" (1965)	"Colours" (1965)	"Universal Soldier" (1965)

"Colours" is a song written and recorded by Scottish singer-songwriter Donovan for his second album, Fairytale. "Colours" was released as a single in the United Kingdom on 28 May 1965 through Pye Records (Pye 7N 15866) and a few months later in the United States through Hickory Records (Hickory 45-1324). The single was backed with "To Sing for You" on the UK release and "Josie" on the US release. Both B-side selections came from Donovan's first album, What's Bin Did and What's Bin Hid (1965).

== Background and composition ==
Donovan followed up the success of "Catch the Wind" with "Colours", which featured a similar folk style. According to an interview with Record Mirror, Donovan claims he wrote the song "on the spot" during a recording session on 5 May 1965, at the Southern Music studios in London. Unlike "Catch The Wind", which featured a string arrangement "Colours" features Donovan playing banjo and the harmonica in addition to acoustic guitar. Former Shadows member Brian Locking guests on the recording, playing bass. As with all of Donovan's material released in 1965, "Colours" was produced by Terry Kennedy, Peter Eden and Geoff Stephens.

== Release and reception ==
Swedish release of "Colours" single.

"Colours" was released on 28 May 1965 in the UK with the B-side "To Sing For You". The single matched the success of "Catch the Wind" in the United Kingdom, reaching No. 4 on the charts. In the United States, "Colours" reached number 61 on the Billboard Hot 100, and marked a decline in the artist's popularity relative to "Catch the Wind". A different mix of the song (without harmonica) was released on his second album Fairytale. Billboard praised the "intriguing lyric and melody." Cash Box described it as a "tender, slow-moving, rhythmic pledge of romantic devotion sold by the songster in his distinctive Bob Dylan-ish style."

For the 1969 Epic Records release Donovan's Greatest Hits, Donovan re-recorded "Catch the Wind" and "Colours" in the studio with Big Jim Sullivan playing guitar, John Paul Jones on bass and keyboards and Clem Cattini on drums, produced by Mickie Most.

The song proved to be quite accessible for more mainstream artists, with covers by Claudine Longet, Percy Faith, Van Dyke Parks, actress Patty Duke, Murray Head, and The Kingston Trio.

== Other versions by Donovan ==
- A live duet with Joan Baez from the 1965 Newport Folk Festival is included on the 1995 compilation Folk Music at Newport, Part 1.
- The 2002 album Pied Piper features a re-recorded version by Donovan with new lyrics for children.
- The 2002 film The Rules of Attraction features a re-recorded version by Donovan which would after be used in various television commercials.

== Personnel ==
Personnel according to the liner notes of Troubadour: The Definitive Collection 1964–1976, unless otherwise noted.

Musicians

- Donovan – vocals, acoustic guitar, banjo, harmonica (Single version)
- Brian Locking – bass

Production

- Terry Kennedy – producer
- Peter Eden – producer
- Geoff Stephens – producer

== Charts ==
=== Weekly charts ===
Chart (1965)	Peak position
Australia (Kent Music Report)	81
Canada (RPM Play Sheet)	8
Belgium (Ultratop 50 Wallonia)	42
Finland (Mitä Suomi Soittaa)	20
France (SNEP)	18
Ireland (RTÉ)	10
Netherlands (Veronica Top 40)	8
Netherlands (Single Top 100)	8
Sweden (Kvällstoppen)	5
Sweden (Tio i Topp)	4
UK (Disc Weekly)	5
UK (Melody Maker)	5
UK (New Musical Express)	5
UK (Record Retailer)	4
US (Billboard Hot 100)	61
US (Cash Box Top 100)	40
US (Record World 100 Top Pops)	44

=== Year-end charts ===
Chart (1965)	Peak position
Netherlands (Veronica Top 40)	46
UK (Record Retailer)	64
