= Catch the Wind =

Single by Donovan

from the album What's Bin Did and What's Bin Hid
- B-side: Why Do You Treat Me Like You Do?
- Released: 28 February 1965
- Recorded: February 1965
- Studio: Olympic, London
- Genre: Folk
- Length: 2:21
- Label: Pye
- Songwriter: Donovan Leitch
- Producers: Terry Kennedy; Peter Eden; Geoff Stephens

Donovan singles chronology
"Catch the Wind" (1965)	"Colours" (1965)

Audio
- "Catch the Wind" on YouTube

"Catch the Wind" is a song written and recorded by Scottish singer-songwriter Donovan. Pye Records released "Catch the Wind" backed with "Why Do You Treat Me Like You Do?" as Donovan's debut release (Pye 7N.15801) in the United Kingdom on 28 February 1965. The single reached No. 4 in the United Kingdom singles chart. Hickory Records released the single in the United States in April 1965 (Hickory 45-1309), where it reached No. 23 in the United States Billboard Hot 100.

== Recording ==
The single version of "Catch the Wind" was recorded at Olympic Studios in London. Donovan played guitar and sang on the recording, and was accompanied by nine session musicians: four viola players, four violin players and a string bass player. According to Donovan biographyer Lorne Murdoch, the string arrangement on the single version was performed by the London Philharmonic Orchestra, with an arrangement written by Ken Lewis of the Ivy League. He additionally opined that Donovan's commercial recording career commenced with the recording of "Catch The Wind" in February 1965.

== Release and reception ==
In May 1965, Pye Records released a different version of "Catch the Wind" on Donovan's debut LP record album What's Bin Did and What's Bin Hid (NPL.18117) (retitled Catch the Wind in the US). While the single version featured vocal echo and a string section, the album version lacked those elements and instead featured Donovan playing harmonica.

Cash Box described it as a "medium-paced, folk-styled low-down bluesey romancer," with a Bob Dylan-like vocal. Record World likewise described it as "Dylanesque."

When Epic Records was compiling Donovan's Greatest Hits in 1968, the label was either unable or unwilling to secure the rights to the original recordings of "Catch the Wind" and Donovan's follow-up single, "Colours". Donovan re-recorded both songs for the album, with a full backing band including Big Jim Sullivan playing guitar and Mickie Most producing.

== Chart performance ==
=== Weekly charts ===
Chart (1965)	Peak position
Australia (Kent Music Report)	5
Canada (RPM Play Sheet)	10
Finland (Mitä Suomi Soittaa)	17
Ireland (RTÉ)	9
Netherlands (Veronica Top 40)	21
UK (Disc Weekly)	5
UK (Melody Maker)	5
UK (New Musical Express)	6
UK (Record Retailer)	4
US (Billboard Hot 100)	23
US (Cash Box Top 100)	28
US (Record World 100 Top Pops)	22

=== Year-end charts ===
Chart (1965)	Peak position
UK (Record Retailer)	47

== Works cited ==
- Cleave, Maureen (13 February 1965a). "Maureen Cleave Disc Date". Evening Standard. London, Greater London, England. p. 7.
- Cleave, Maureen (17 February 1965b). "Disc Date". Evening Post. Bristol, Avon, England. p. 6.
- Cleave, Maureen (6 March 1965c). "Maureen Cleave's Pop Spot". Evening Chronicle. Newcastle Upon Tyne, Tyne and Wear, England. p. 5.
- Reynolds, Stanley (6 March 1965). "We copied him first". The Guardian. London, Greater London, England. p. 14.
- Farmer, Bob (18 March 1965). "The New Discs". Citizen. Gloucester, Gloucestershire, England. p. 10.
- Lincolnshire Echo staff (18 March 1965). "Records to Put Spring into You". Lincolnshire Echo. Lincoln, Lincolnshire, England. p. 8.
- Nelson, Gene (2 May 1965). "Pop Singles Catching the Wind". The San Francisco Examiner. San Francisco, California. p. 194.
- Bucks Examiner staff (4 June 1965). "Discorner". Bucks Examiner. Chesham, Buckinghamshire, England. p. 7.
