= The Spiral Sacrifice =

Studio album by Sopor Æternus & the Ensemble of Shadows
- Released: February 8, 2018
- Recorded: 2017
- Genre: Darkwave
- Length: 78:42
- Label: Apocalyptic Vision
- Producer: Sopor Æternus

Sopor Æternus & the Ensemble of Shadows chronology
Mitternacht (2014)	The Spiral Sacrifice (2018)	Death & Flamingos (2019)

The Spiral Sacrifice is the 13th album by Sopor Æternus & the Ensemble of Shadows. The album was released on February 8, 2018 on four different formats: on compact disc format with 128-page hardcover book (limited to 1500 copies); on 3x12" black vinyl with an additional booklet (limited to 500 copies); on two tape versions (Hot Pink and Pale Pink) wax-sealed, signed and hand-packaged by Anna Varney herself; and on a limited Supporter's Box edition including the compact disc version format, 3x12" pink vinyl, an extra 7" vinyl with two chamber music-like dark ambient mixes, a fold-out poster, a hand-numbered certificate of authenticity and a T-shirt . The Supporter's Box was initially intended to be limited to 500 copies, although Anna has since stated on her official Facebook page that only 485 were actually produced.

== Overview ==
On December 16, 2016, Anna-Varney Cantodea announced through her official site the start of a crowdfunding campaign to record a new Sopor Aeternus album. The campaign launched off with the idea of every sopor fan donating 2 euros through Sopor Aeternus official mailorder. Later on, more options were added on the platform for donations above 2 euros. In June 2017, the guide-tracks for the new album were recorded as Alex Storm, from Apocalyptic Vision, informed that once the crowdfunding hit the 50%, the recordings would begin. On that occasion, Cantodea stated on Facebook that:

"THE SPIRAL SACRIFICE" embraces everything from "The inexperienced Spiral Traveller" as well as the "Voyager" album (minus the actual cover versions and the songs I already re-recorded to my satisfaction), two demos from "Like a Corpse standing in Desperation"...all tied together by the songs/things that came after "Mitternacht"..

In November 2017, several emails were sent to donors with the news of the release of the new album in a Supporter's box edition. In December 2017, the mixing of the album was completed in one month, from November to December, and the crowdfunding campaign reached its goal.

The Spiral Sacrifice, as mentioned above, returns to the style of "The inexperienced Spiral Traveller" and Dead Lovers' Sarabande, focusing primarily on neoclassical and baroque pieces centered around flute, dulcimer, violin, cello and brass. Orchestral percussion and a drum kit are also employed throughout the album, along with the synthesizers made common in her more recent albums. Rather than re-record Traveller outright (like Cantodea had done for Es reiten die Toten so schnell), Sacrifice instead re-records three of its songs (and one from Voyager) and lyrically recontextualizes that album. Cantodea reflects back on her time with the "loyal Friend" mentioned in Traveller, her unrequited love for him, and how she dealt with the confusion between falling and love and believing oneself to be incapable of requiring love and affection to function normally. Also of note is that The Spiral Sacrifice dedicates a sizable portion of its running time to instrumentals and instrumental sections within songs, much like Cantodea's first six albums did.

"By the Waters of Forgetfulness" is a full remake of Traveller's "Die Toten Kehren Wieder Mit dem Wind", while "Ein freundlich' Wort einst unverhofft" continues on from "Ein Freundliches Wort... (...hat Meine Seele Berührt.)". "In the old House" quotes from "Die Widerspenstigkeit Unerwünschter Gedanken". "At Sunset Through The Fields Aflame" is an instrumental reprise of Voyager's "Feralia Genetalia". "Through Your Eyes" is a remake of "Watch Your Step".

In October 31, 2018 she released a single called When You Love A Man: Reprise. It's a 5:43 minute length instrumental slow, dark and neoclassical track. She released this single in CD and Vinyl. In January 2019, she released this song digital version on Bandcamp.

== Track listing ==
Tracklisting CD

All tracks are written by Anna-Varney Cantodea except where noted

No.	Title	Length
1.	"Everything is an Illusion"	5:50
2.	"Where the End begins"	5:19
3.	"There are Scars in the Evening Sky"	2:15
4.	"The broken & shattered Moon"	5:12
5.	"I cannot go back to the Way I was"	1:43
6.	"In the Company of Beasts"	3:58
7.	"When you love a Man"	6:46
8.	"Through the Forest wondrously"	2:16
9.	"By the Waters of Forgetfulness"	2:57
10.	"Ein freundlich' Wort einst unverhofft"	3:41
11.	"I am done with Men"	3:29
12.	"Sometimes you make me smile"	2:41
13.	"At Sunset through the Fields aflame"	2:39
14.	"In the old House (we made out well)"	3:01
15.	"Light in the Attic"	3:42
16.	"If I could go back in Time"	7:05
17.	"I am so glad it's over"	2:55
18.	"Let me say it now"	5:52
19.	"Through your Eyes"	7:21

Tracklisting Vinyl

Vinyl 1 - Side A
No.	Title	Length
1.	"Everything is an Illusion"	5:50
2.	"Where the End begins"	5:19
3.	"There are Scars in the Evening Sky"	2:15

Vinyl 1 - Side B
No.	Title	Length
1.	"The broken & shattered Moon"	5:12
2.	"I cannot go back to the Way I was"	1:43
3.	"In the Company of Beasts"	3:58

Vinyl 2 - Side A
No.	Title	Length
1.	"When you love a Man"	6:46
2.	"Through the Forest wondrously"	2:16
3.	"By the Waters of Forgetfulness"	2:57
4.	"Ein freundlich' Wort einst unverhofft"	3:41

Vinyl 2 - Side B
No.	Title	Length
1.	"I am done with Men"	3:29
2.	"Sometimes you make me smile"	2:41
3.	"At Sunset through the Fields aflame"	2:39
4.	"In the old House (we made out well)"	3:01

Vinyl 3 - Side A
No.	Title	Length
1.	"Light in the Attic"	3:42
2.	"If I could go back in Time"	7:05
3.	"I am so glad it's over"	2:55

Vinyl 3 - Side B
No.	Title	Length
1.	"Let me say it now"	5:52
2.	"Through your Eyes"	7:21

Tracklisting 7" Vinyl

Side A
No.	Title	Length
1.	"Light in the Attic (reprise)"	03:43

Side B
No.	Title	Length
1.	"The broken & shattered Moon (reprise)"	05:13

== Personnel ==
Sopor Aeternus and The Ensemble of Shadows

- Anna-Varney Cantodea: Vocals, all other instruments, programming, mixing

Additional Musicians

- Nikos Mavridis: Violin, Hammond Organ
- Tim Ströble: Cello
- Tilman Steinweg: Doublebass
- Sebastian Jülich: Bassoon, Contrabassoon
- Isabel Funke: Clarinet
- Nicole Röhrig: Flute
- Jonas Schira:Trumpet, Flugelhorn
- Michael Fütterer: Trombone
- Patrick Chirilus-Bruckner: Tuba
- Patrick Damiani: Bass, Recording, Mixing
- Marcel Millot: Drums
- Robin Schmidt: Mastering

Choir

- Ayhan Kamil: Tenor
- Gerrit Oergen: Baritone
- Gunther Rapp: Bass
