= Mitternacht =

Mitternacht (German "midnight") may refer to:

== Television ==
- "Mitternacht, Switzerland", fictional town in an episode of U.S. television series "Perry Mason" titled "The Case of a Place Called Midnight", originally aired on 11/12/1964.

== Music ==
- "Mitternacht", song by E Nomine
- Mitternacht (La Fee song)
- "Mitternacht", song by Kraftwerk from Autobahn (album)

== See also ==
- Mitternacht - The Dark Night of the Soul, 2014 album by German darkwave-neofolk project Sopor Aeternus.
- Mitternacht, album by punk band Dödelhaie de:Dödelhaie
