= Brother Sun, Sister Moon (disambiguation) =

Brother Sun, Sister Moon may refer to:

- Brother Sun, Sister Moon, biographical movie of St. Francis of Assisi
- Brother Sun, Sister Moon (album), soundtrack of the movie.
- Brother Sun Sister Moon (musical duo), a musical duo of Paul Robb and Barbara Cohen
