= Poetica (All Beauty Sleeps) =

Studio album by Sopor Æternus & the Ensemble of Shadows
- Released: 2013
- Recorded: 2012
- Genre: Darkwave
- Length: 79:05
- Label: Apocalyptic Vision
- Producer: Sopor Æternus

Sopor Æternus & the Ensemble of Shadows chronology
Have You Seen This Ghost? (2011)	Poetica (All Beauty Sleeps) (2013)	Mitternacht - The Dark Night of the Soul (2014)

Alternative cover
- Vinyl cover by Natalie Shau

Poetica (All Beauty Sleeps) is the eleventh album by Sopor Æternus & the Ensemble of Shadows. The album consists of musical adaptations of Poe's poems, some of them already made by Cantodea in previous albums: "Dreamland" is found on Todeswunsch under the title of "Die Bruderschaft des Schmerzes"; "Alone" on Voyager: The Jugglers of Jusa; "The Sleeper" on Dead Lovers' Sarabande (Face One); and "The Conqueror Worm" on Flowers in Formaldehyde. However, all the musical arrangements were redone in the new versions.

The album was released in September 2013 in two different formats: in compact disc format with an opulent hardcover photo book of 156 pages (28 x 28 cm), and an exclusive T-shirt (limited to 1999 copies); and on 12-inch vinyl with two posters, exclusive artwork by Natalie Shau and Keith Thompson, and a different T-shirt (limited to 890 copies.) Both editions were signed and numbered by Anna-Varney Cantodea herself. Additionally, the album was released via Bandcamp for digital download.

== Track listing ==
All lyrics are written by Anna-Varney Cantodea and Edgar Allan Poe; all music is composed by Cantodea.

No.	Title	Length
1.	"The Oblong Box"	1:21
2.	"Dreamland"	14:24
3.	"Eldorado"	5:33
4.	"The Sleeper"	11:01
5.	"Alone"	5:05
6.	"The Conqueror Worm"	5:50
7.	"Alone (2)"	7:16
8.	"The City in the Sea"	10:45
9.	"The Oblong Box (2)"	1:16
10.	"The Haunted Palace"	10:16
11.	"A Dream Within a Dream"	6:12

== Personnel ==
- Nikos Mavridis: Violin
- Tim Ströble: Cello
- Patrick Damiani: Bass, Lute, Recording, Mixing
- Jonas Schira: Cornet
- Michael Fütterer: Trombone
- Patrick Chirilus-Bruckner: Tuba
- Robin Schmidt: Mastering
- Anna-Varney Cantodea: Vocals, All other instruments, Programming, Mixing
