= Sister Moon =

"Sister Moon" is a phrase from the 1224 religious poem "Canticle of the Sun" by Francis of Assisi.

Sister Moon may also refer to:

- "Sister Moon" (Transvision Vamp song), a 1988 song
- "Sister Moon", a song by Sting from his 1987 album ...Nothing Like the Sun
- "Sister Moon", a song by Gotthard from their 1996 album G.
- "Sister Moon", a song by Gene Clark from his 1977 album Two Sides to Every Story

== See also ==
- Brother Sun, Sister Moon, a 1972 film by Franco Zeffirelli about Francis of Assisi
- Brother Sun, Sister Moon (album), a soundtrack album for the film, by Donovan, released in 2004
- Sisters of the Moon, a song by Fleetwood Mac from Tusk
