= Voyager: The Jugglers of Jusa =

Remix album by Sopor Aeternus & the Ensemble of Shadows
- Released: 1997
- Genre: Neo-Medieval, neoclassical darkwave, gothic rock
- Length: 60:25
- Label: Apocalyptic Vision
- Producer: Sopor Aeternus

Sopor Aeternus remix album chronology
Voyager: The Jugglers of Jusa (1997)	Sanatorium Altrosa (2008)

Voyager: The Jugglers of Jusa is the first remix album by darkwave band Sopor Aeternus & the Ensemble of Shadows, and was released in 1997. It was released as a companion to The inexperienced Spiral Traveller (aus dem Schoß der Hölle ward geboren die Totensonne), also released that year, and primarily features alternate versions of songs from that album. Only 3,000 copies of the album were pressed.

== Overview ==
Like the earlier EP Ehjeh Ascher Ehjeh, Voyager consists of remixed versions of songs accompanied by some newer songs. Most of the remixed songs have had either their backing tracks removed, or had extra percussion and drum machines added. "Never trust the Obvious" receives two remixes: "The Innocence of Devils: Alone", which contains a recitation of author Edgar Allan Poe's Alone; and "Alone II", an extended version. The signature piece "Birth - Fiendish Figuration" is also featured as an instrumental; a remix of "Saturn-Impressionen" from Todeswunsch - Sous le soleil de Saturne also appears on this album.

The newer songs include "Modela est", a cover version of Kraftwerk's "Das Model" ("The Model"), sung in Latin; and "Feralia Genitalia", another ode to transsexualism as Anna-Varney Cantodea describes her "genitals rotting off" and her transformation into a woman.

Voyager: The Jugglers of Jusa was re-released alongside Ehjeh Ascher Ehjeh and the demo tape Es reiten die Toten so schnell... as part of the rarities box set Like a Corpse Standing in Desperation, due to costly prices for cheap copies of the album being sold on eBay. In the liner notes of the box set, Anna-Varney announces her outright hatred for Voyager by opening its section of liner notes with:

... oh dear. What good thing could I possibly say about this most horrible piece of crap?!

Similar comments were made about The Inexperienced Spiral Traveller. Cantodea, in the same essay, expresses her wishes to re-record the album at a future point. So far, only "May I kiss your Wound ?" has been re-recorded (for Songs from the Inverted Womb), while elements of "Feralia Genitalia" were re-used for "Va(r)nitas, vanitas... (...omnia vanitas)" on Dead Lovers' Sarabande (Face Two).

She rerecorded "Alone" on Poetica (All Beauty Sleeps), and she recorded some samples from Feralia Genitalia on her 2018 album The Spiral Sacrifice.

== Track listing ==
All tracks are written by Anna-Varney Cantodea.

No.	Title	Length
1.	"The inexperienced Spiral Traveller: * a fragment II *"	5:07
2.	"Ein freundliches Wort... (...hat meine Seele berührt.) (defined and fragile)" ("A kind word... (...has touched my soul.)")	5:10
3.	"Memalon II"	7:25
4.	"The Innocence of Devils: "Alone" (E. A. Poe)"	6:27
5.	"Modela est" ("The Model"; Ralf Hütter, Karl Bartos, Emil Schult)	4:35
6.	"Birth (instr.)"	2:49
7.	"Feralia Genitalia (Arrival of the Jugglers)"	6:30
8.	"Menuetto"	1:26
9.	"Saturn-Impressionen (Jusa, Jusa)" ("Saturn-Impressions (Jusa, Jusa)")	2:48
10.	"May I kiss your Wound ? (Saturn:Orion)"	6:05
11.	"Alone II"	6:55
12.	"The inexperienced Spiral Traveller: * a fragment II * (instr.)"	5:08

== Personnel ==
- Una Fallada: Violin
- Matthias Eder: Cello
- Gerrit Fischer: Guitar
- Constanze Spengler: Lute
- Anna-Varney Cantodea: Vocals, all other instruments and programming
