= Beat Cafe =

Studio album by Donovan
- Released: 24 August 2004
- Recorded: 2002–2003
- Studio: Capitol Studio B, Hollywood, California; Pacifica Studios, Los Angeles, California
- Genre: Rock
- Label: Appleseed
- Producer: John Chelew

Donovan chronology
| Brother Sun, Sister Moon (2004) | Beat Cafe (2004) | To Try for the Sun: The Journey of Donovan (2005) |

Beat Cafe is the 23rd studio album, and 28th album overall, from Scottish singer-songwriter Donovan. It is his first collection containing newly written songs since his 1996 album Sutras. Beat Cafe was released worldwide (Appleseed Records 1081) on 24 August 2004. The first 1000 CDs were autographed and hand numbered.

== History ==
After the launching of his website and three new releases within two years, Donovan entered the studio with a new band including his longtime friends Danny Thompson on bass and Jim Keltner on drums. The new sessions, produced by John Chelew, mixed rock and roll with a beatnik style. In addition to handling production duties, Chelew contributed keyboards to many of the songs on the album.

While many of the songs were new compositions, Donovan also revamped a few older compositions. Among these songs are "Poorman's Sunshine", originally titled "Poor Man's Sunshine (Nativity)", and "Lord of the Universe". Both originated during the Barabajagal sessions. "Lover O Lover" was originally released on Love Is Only Feeling in 1981.

== Critical reception ==
Professional ratings
Review scores
| Source | Rating |
|---|---|
| AllMusic | link |
| PopMatters | (Favourable) link |
| Rolling Stone | link |
| UNCUT | link |

Beat Cafe was positively received by music critics. They indicated that the album managed to preserve the beatnik atmosphere Donovan was famous for.

== Track listing ==
All tracks by Donovan Leitch, except where noted.

=== Original album ===
1. "Love Floats" – 4:18
2. "Poorman's Sunshine" – 4:02
3. "Beat Cafe" – 4:14
4. "Yin My Yang" – 3:35
5. "Whirlwind" – 4:46
6. "Two Lovers" – 3:42
7. "The Question" – 3:06
8. "Lord of the Universe" – 4:47
9. "Lover O Lover" – 4:56
10. "The Cuckoo" (Traditional) – 3:49
11. "Do Not Go Gentle" (poem by Dylan Thomas, music by Donovan Leitch) – 4:27
12. "Shambala" – 5:29

== Personnel ==
- Donovan – guitar, vocals, artwork
- Danny Thompson – double bass
- John Chelew – keyboards
- Jim Keltner – drums, percussion
