= Pied Piper (Donovan album) =

Studio album by Donovan
- Released: 19 March 2002
- Recorded: 2001–02
- Genre: Folk
- Length: 49:09
- Label: Rhino; Donovan Discs
- Producer: Leib Ostrow

Donovan chronology
| Greatest Hits Live: Vancouver 1986 (2001) | Pied Piper (2002) | Sixty Four (2004) |

Professional ratings
Review scores
| Source | Rating |
|---|---|
| Allmusic | 2.5/5 stars |

Pied Piper is the twentieth studio album (25th overall), by Scottish singer-songwriter Donovan. It marks the third album of his children's music, after the For Little Ones portion of A Gift from a Flower to a Garden and H.M.S. Donovan. Pied Piper was released in both the UK and US (Rhino 78290) on 19 March 2002.

== History ==
After it became apparent that Sutras was going to be the only Donovan album released on Rick Rubin's American Recordings label, Donovan withdrew from releasing new music. His focus shifted to restructuring his business by organizing a website and creating his own record label, Donovan Discs. He also began to write an autobiography and search for studio tapes that were deep in record company archives.

In the meantime, Beat Goes On Records reissued many of Donovan's albums in the UK. Many of these albums had been out of print since their original vinyl release. With the combination of selecting rare albums and offering them on-line, Beat Goes On Records were able to capitalize on these releases by selling them in the US as imports. These releases included two of his children's albums, For Little Ones (from A Gift from a Flower to a Garden) and H.M.S. Donovan.

In light of these releases, Rhino Records subsidiary Music for Little People contacted Donovan to release another children's album. He recorded new songs and new versions of many of his children's songs for the subsequent album, Pied Piper. The album name and title track both come from the 1972 Jacques Demy film The Pied Piper which starred Donovan as the Pied Piper. The album was released in conjunction with his new label and became the first release by Donovan Discs.

== Album origins of tracks ==
The following is a list explaining the original releases of each song:

- "I Love My Shirt" (from Barabajagal, released 11 August 1969)
- "Happiness Runs" (from Barabajagal)
- "Sun Magic" (released as "The Sun Is a Very Magic Fellow" on The Hurdy Gurdy Man, released October 1968)
- "People Call Me the Pied Piper" (from the 1972 film The Pied Piper)
- "Little Boy in Corduroy" (from A Gift from a Flower to a Garden, released December 1967)
- "Colours" (from Fairytale, released 22 October 1965)
- "Jackie Beanstalk" (previously unreleased)
- "A Funny Man" (from H.M.S. Donovan, released July 1971)
- "Mandolin Man and His Secret" (from A Gift from a Flower to a Garden)
- "Nature Friends" (previously unreleased)
- "Wynken, Blynken and Nod" (from H.M.S. Donovan)
- "Little Teddy Bear" (previously unreleased)
- "Voyage of the Moon" (from H.M.S. Donovan)

== Track listing ==
All tracks by Donovan Leitch, except where noted.

=== Original album ===
1. "I Love My Shirt" – 3:31
2. "Happiness Runs" – 4:42
3. "Sun Magic" – 3:46
4. "People Call Me the Pied Piper" – 4:21
5. "Little Boy in Corduroy" – 3:39
6. "Colours" – 3:18
7. "Jackie Beanstalk" – 6:24
8. "A Funny Man" (words by Natalie Joan, music by Donovan) – 2:01
9. "Mandolin Man and His Secret" – 3:50
10. "Nature Friends" – 1:16
11. "Wynken, Blynken, and Nod" (words by Eugene Field, music by Donovan) – 3:26
12. "Little Teddy Bear" – 3:00
13. "Voyage of the Moon" – 5:50
