= Dead Lovers' Sarabande (Face Two) =

Dead Lovers' Saraband (Face Two)

Studio album by Sopor Aeternus & the Ensemble of Shadows
- Released: 1999
- Genre: Darkwave
- Length: 59:35
- Label: Apocalyptic Vision
- Producer: Sopor Aeternus

Sopor Aeternus & the Ensemble of Shadows chronology
Dead Lovers' Sarabande (Face One) (1999)	Dead Lovers' Saraband (Face Two) (1999)	Songs from the Inverted Womb (2000)

Alternative cover
- 2004 re-release cover

Dead Lovers' Sarabande (Face Two) is the fifth album by darkwave band Sopor Aeternus & the Ensemble of Shadows, and was released in 1999. It is the second of a two-album suite detailing the mourning of a lover who has recently passed. Like Face One, Face Two was also released in multiple formats, including a double vinyl edition and an A5-sized boxed set edition; both were limited pressings, of 500 and 3,000 copies, respectively.

== Overview ==
Dead Lovers' Sarabande, as a whole, is a transitory death suite detailing the unnamed protagonist's mourning of her lover and her desire to rejoin him in the afterlife. Major recurring themes in the work include euthanasia, necrophilia, decay and loneliness. In (Face Two), the protagonist seems to have accepted the fact that her lover is dead and they will no longer share the same life they have led. She decides to continue loving him as she always have, despite his memory haunting her. She concludes by admitting that "it's easier to love the dead" and that she would truly be alone if Love was considered everything in life, rather than Death or Loneliness. Anna-Varney Cantodea later admitted that "Dead Lovers' Sarabande" was dedicated to, but not about, the late Rozz Williams, former frontman of deathrock band Christian Death.

The album retains the focus on folk music and chamber pieces presented by (Face One), but transplants many of the string instruments for brass arrangements. Electric guitar is featured on "If Loneliness was all", for the first time since "Todeswunsch - Sous le soleil de Saturne". The influence of drone music is still present on songs like "Procession/Funeral March". "Va(r)nitas, vanitas..." contains elements of "Feralia Genetalia" from "Voyager" - The Jugglers of Jusa. As a subtle joke, Cantodea referenced her own name in the song title, effectively translating it as "Varney, vanity... (...all is vanity)."

"Dead Lovers' Sarabande" (Face Two) was re-released on CD with newly packaged artwork in 2004.

== Track listing ==
All tracks are written by Anna-Varney Cantodea.

No.	Title	Length
1.	"Abschied (orig. words & lyrics by NICO)" ("Farewell"; Christa Päffgen)	7:01
2.	"The Dog Burial"	1:15
3.	"The House is empty now"	2:54
4.	"No-one is there"	6:41
5.	"Procession/Funeral March"	6:44
6.	"Va(r)nitas, vanitas... (...omnia vanitas)" ("Varney, vanity... (...all is vanity)")	9:05
7.	"The Hourglass"	2:22
8.	"Transfiguration"	5:20
9.	"Has he come to test me?"	2:09
10.	"If Loneliness was all"	8:40
11.	"Daffodils"	7:22

== Personnel ==
- Katrin Ebert: Violin
- Martin Höfert: Cello
- Johannes Knirsch: Double bass
- Eric Santie-Laa: Cor anglais
- Doreena Gor: Bassoon
- Michael Schmeißer: Trumpet
- Carsten Weilnau: Trombone
- Eugene de la Fontaine: Tuba, oboe
- Thomas Langer: Guitars
- Anna-Varney Cantodea: Vocals, all other instruments and programming
