= Sixty Four =

Studio album by Donovan
- Released: February 2004
- Recorded: 1964
- Genre: Folk
- Label: Donovan Discs

Donovan chronology
Pied Piper (2002)	Sixty Four (2004)	Brother Sun, Sister Moon (2004)

Professional ratings
Review scores
Source	Rating
Allmusic	3/5 stars

Sixty Four is the 21st studio album and 26th album overall from Scottish singer-songwriter Donovan. It is composed of demo tracks recorded by Donovan in 1964. Sixty Four was released in the United States in February 2004 by Donovan Discs, his own record label.

== History ==
In the summer of 1964, Donovan negotiated his first record contract with Pye Records and recorded several demo songs. At the time, these demos were intended to circulate within the record company and were not intended for public release. The tapes were subsequently archived and their existence was relatively unknown to the public.

When Donovan was assisting with the compilation of his first compact disc boxed set Troubadour: The Definitive Collection 1964–1976 in the early 1990s, he gained possession of the original demos. Two of the songs were released on the boxed set; covers of Tim Hardin's "London Town" and Buffy Sainte-Marie's "Co'dine". The remainder of the tapes remained unreleased.

After the release of Sutras in 1996, Donovan focused on reorganizing his business around his own website and launching his own independent music label, Donovan Discs. Donovan Discs issued the set of demos as Sixty Four exclusively through Donovan's new website. A limited number of copies were signed by Donovan and also sold from the website.

The demo tapes feature an 18-year-old Donovan playing guitar and mouth harp. His style is remarkably close to that of both Woody Guthrie and Bob Dylan, but the songs also feature a distinct style that further developed on Donovan's first two albums, What's Bin Did and What's Bin Hid and Fairytale. Two of the tracks would later be remade: "Isle of Sadness" became "Belated Forgiveness Plea" on Fairytale, while "Darkness of My Night" was retitled "Breezes of Patchulie" during the 1966 Sunshine Superman sessions and eventually released on Troubadour.

== Track listing ==
All tracks composed by Donovan Leitch; except where indicated

1. "Crazy 'Bout a Woman" (Jesse Fuller) – 2:42
2. "Talkin' Pop Star Blues" – 3:29
3. "Dirty Old Town" (Ewan MacColl) – 2:31
4. "Keep on Truckin'" (Traditional; arranged by Donovan Leitch) – 2:19
5. "Co'dine" (Buffy Sainte-Marie) – 4:47
6. "London Town" (Tim Hardin) – 4:08
7. "Isle of Sadness" – 3:03
8. "Darkness of My Night" – 3:28
9. "Freedom Road" – 2:06
