= Greatest Hits Live: Vancouver 1986 =

Greatest Hits Live – Vancouver 1986

Live album by Donovan
- Released: October 2, 2001
- Recorded: 1986
- Genre: Folk
- Length: 63:33
- Label: Varèse Sarabande
- Producer: Patrick Hehir; Cary E. Mansfield

Donovan chronology
Rising Again (2001)	Greatest Hits Live – Vancouver 1986 (2001)	Pied Piper (2002)

Professional ratings
Review scores
Source	Rating
Allmusic	2.5/5 stars

Greatest Hits Live – Vancouver 1986 is the fifth live album, and 24th album overall, from Scottish singer-songwriter Donovan. It was released in the on October 2, 2001 (Varése Sarabande 302 066 259 2) on CD.

== History ==
During the 1980s, Mellow Records recorded many of Donovan's live concerts. These recordings comprised the albums Rising (1990) and Rising Again (early 2001). In late 2001, Varèse Sarabande released another set of these live recordings titled Greatest Hits Live – Vancouver 1986. As the title describes, the tracks were recorded in Vancouver, British Columbia, Canada in 1986. The initial release of the album also has three tracks from a 1986 Donovan concert in Carnegie Hall, New York City. As an added incentive for Donovan's fans, Sarabande added a 1981 demo version of the Neutronica track, "Only to Be Expected".

Since it was from the same time period, Greatest Hits Live – Vancouver 1986 sounds similar to both Rising and Rising Again. The instrumentation is sparse, and Donovan even recites the same stories about the songs. Greatest Hits Live – Vancouver 1986 also shares many of the same songs as Rising and Rising Again.

== Track listing ==
All tracks by Donovan Leitch, except where noted.

1. "Josie" – 3:47
2. "Catch the Wind" – 3:18
3. "Isle of Islay" – 5:17
4. "Sunshine Superman" – 3:49
5. "Hey Gyp (Dig the Slowness)" – 2:34
6. "Universal Soldier" (Buffy Sainte-Marie) – 3:57
7. "Laléna" – 2:58
8. "Jennifer Juniper" – 2:47
9. "Hurdy Gurdy Man" – 5:00
10. "Happiness Runs" – 4:22
11. "The Little Tin Soldier" (Shawn Phillips) – 3:50
12. "Mellow Yellow" – 2:50
13. "Atlantis" – 2:57
14. "There Is a Mountain" – 2:35

Bonus tracks:

1. "Sailing Homeward" – 3:27
2. "Mr. Flute Man" (track from Rising Again) – 2:08
3. "Young Girl Blues" – 5:11
4. "Only to Be Expected" (demo recording of the song from Neutronica) – 2:38

All tracks, except for "Mr. Flute Man" were released in studio versions: "Isle of Islay" was released on A Gift from a Flower to a Garden, "The Little Tin Soldier" on Fairytale, "Happiness Runs" on Barabajagal, "Sailing Homeward" on Essence to Essence, and on singles.
