= Eldorado (poem) =

Poem written by Edgar Allan Poe

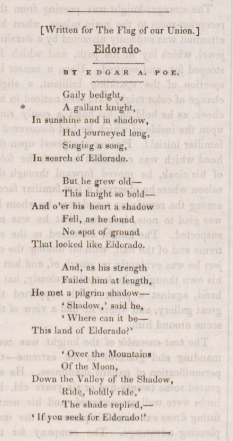
First publication in The Flag of Our Union, April 21, 1849

Eldorado

Gaily bedight,
A gallant knight,
In sunshine and in shadow,
Had journeyed long,
Singing a song,
In search of Eldorado.

But he grew old—
This knight so bold—
And o'er his heart a shadow
Fell as he found
No spot of ground
That looked like Eldorado.

And, as his strength
Failed him at length,
He met a pilgrim shadow—
"Shadow," said he,
"Where can it be—
This land of Eldorado?"

"Over the Mountains
Of the Moon,
Down the Valley of the Shadow,
Ride, boldly ride,"
The shade replied—
"If you seek for Eldorado!"

"Eldorado" is a poem written by Edgar Allan Poe, first published in April 1849.

== Summary ==
The poem describes the journey of a "gallant knight" in search of the legendary city of El Dorado. The knight spends much of his life on this quest. In his old age, he finally meets a "pilgrim shadow" who points the way through "the Valley of Shadow". It was first published in the April 21, 1849, issue of the Boston-based The Flag of Our Union.

== Analysis ==
The poem is a narrative made up of four six-line stanzas, known as sestets. Poe uses the term shadow in the middle of each stanza. The meaning of the word, however, changes with each use. First, it is a literal shadow, where the sun is blocked out. In the second, it implies gloom or despair. The third denotes a ghost. The final use, "the Valley of Shadow", references the "Valley of the Shadow of Death", possibly suggesting that Eldorado (or riches in general) does not exist in the living world, or may be extremely difficult to find in the physical realm. Eldorado can also be interpreted not as the worldly, yellowish metal, but as treasures that actually have the possibility of existence in the abode of spirits. These "spiritual" treasures are that of the mind: knowledge, understanding, and wisdom.

The time of the poem's publication, 1849, was during the California Gold Rush and the poem is, in part, Poe's reaction to that event. A year earlier, after the discovery of gold in 1848, the California Herald included a headline calling California the "El Dorado of the United States of America". Shortly before publishing the poem, in a letter to a friend named Frederick W. Thomas dated February 14, 1849, Poe compared his efforts to earn a living from writing with those seeking gold:

Depend upon it, after all, Thomas. Literature is the most noble of professions. In fact, it is about the only one fit for a man. For my own part, there is no seducing me from the path. I shall be a litterateur, at least, all my life; nor would I abandon the hopes which still lead me on for all the gold in California.

"Eldorado" was one of Poe's last poems. As Poe scholar Scott Peeples wrote, the poem is "a fitting close to a discussion of Poe's career." Like the subject of the poem, Poe was on a quest for success or happiness and, despite spending his life searching for it, he eventually loses his strength and faces death. John Cullen Gruesser similarly notes that the poem depicts Poe's unrealized dream of wealth and fame as a writer.

== Legacy ==
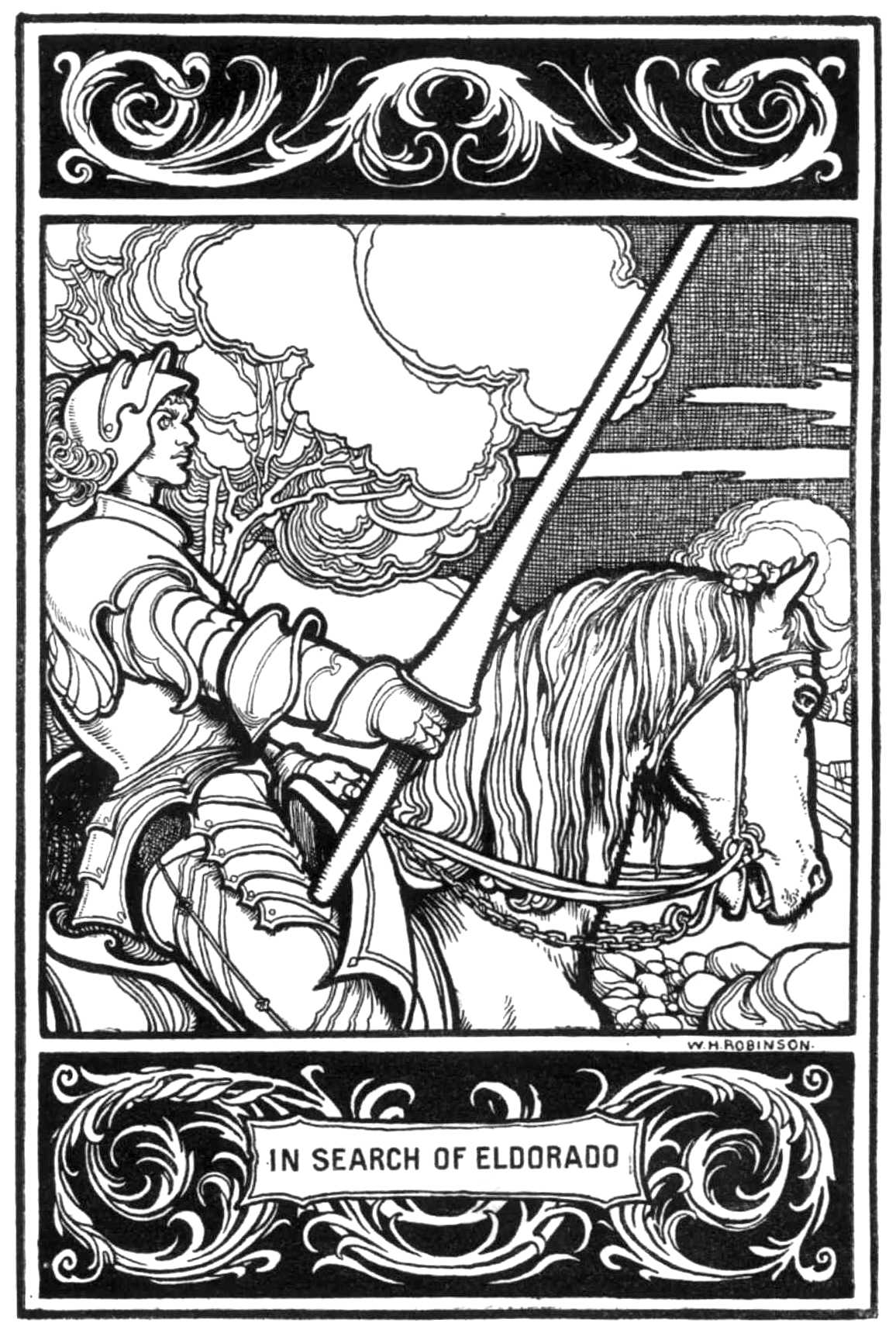
Illustration by William Heath Robinson, 1900

"Eldorado" was set to music by several 19th-century composers, including the Americans Charles Sanford Skilton, Edgar Stillman Kelley, Bertram Shapleigh, and the British composer Richard Henry Walthew, and for the London choir by Joseph Harold Hinton. In 1993 Eldorado, along with "Hymn" and "Evening Star", was adapted by Jonathan Adams as Three Songs from Edgar Allan Poe for SATB chorus and piano. The composer John Adams also composed an Eldorado symphony.

In popular music, the poem was used in 1996 for the lyrics of a Donovan song on his album Sutras. In 2000 "Eldorado" was adapted as song by the Darkwave band Sopor Aeternus & the Ensemble of Shadows on the album Songs from the inverted Womb and again in 2013 on the album Poetica (All Beauty Sleeps).

In 1903, the American writer Ridgely Torrence published his drama El Dorado: A Tragedy, with lines from Poe's poem as an epigraph.

In the 1966 John Wayne film El Dorado, James Caan recites parts of the poems at different times. Caan's character Mississippi recites all but the second stanza of the poem during the film. The character learned the poem from a mentor, Johnny Diamond, whose death he avenged. In the 1990 movie Young Guns 2, Kiefer Sutherland's character, Josiah "Doc" Scurlock was heard reciting the last stanza for a prostitute and claiming to have written the poem himself. In 2012 the poem was recited and is a central part of the plot of the horror-comedy film Eldorado.

In 2017, Mad Duck recorded a version of "Eldorado" in the album Braggart stories and dark poems.

In 2024, San Francisco based band The Back Roads recorded a version of "El Dorado" on the indie folk rock album Queen of Hearts.
