= The Inexperienced Spiral Traveller =

The inexperienced Spiral Traveller

Studio album by Sopor Aeternus & the Ensemble of Shadows
- Released: 1997
- Recorded: 1996 – April 5, 1997
- Genre: Darkwave
- Length: 72:11
- Label: Apocalyptic Vision
- Producer: Sopor Aeternus

Sopor Aeternus & the Ensemble of Shadows chronology
Todeswunsch (1995)	The inexperienced Spiral Traveller (1997)	Dead Lovers' Sarabande (Face One) (1999)

Alternative covers
- Limited edition digipak cover

Alternative cover
- 2004 re-release edition

The inexperienced Spiral Traveller (aus dem Schoß der Hölle ward geboren die Totensonne) (German: "from the Womb of Hell was born the Sun of the Dead") is the third album by darkwave band Sopor Aeternus & the Ensemble of Shadows, and was released in 1997. The inexperienced Spiral Traveller continued the Renaissance- and Baroque-inspired sound of "Todeswunsch - Sous le soleil de Saturne", but with tighter arrangements and the re-introduction of drum machines. A limited edition of 3,000 copies was initially available alongside the regular edition, and the album has been re-issued at least twice since.

== Overview ==
The inexperienced Spiral Traveller was the first album to set the sound of Sopor in stone, with its tighter, more expressive arrangements and full utilization of strings and brass. The musical palette was enhanced by the edition of actual violin, cello, and lute players, where synthesizers had been previously used. Drum machines were also integrated with the live percussion on several songs, and production values were at their highest yet with full use of studio techniques, as heard on opening track "Sylla'borêal". Despite this, Anna-Varney Cantodea has publicly stated her distaste for the album, stating:

Hmm... Well... Let's put it this way: The inexperienced Spiral Traveller, has been the worst album I have ever recorded... And after that... It slowly got better.

Similar comments were made about the accompanying remix album, "Voyager - The Jugglers of Jusa".

The subject matter of the album mainly deals with the isolation brought on by Cantodea's illnesses through life. It has been stated in interviews that one illness nearly blinded her permanently, and much of the imagery of the album comes from that episode. The identity of the "loyal friend" mentioned is unknown (although many fans now believe this reference is primarily to depression), but on the later-released "La Chambre D'Echo" - Where the dead Birds sing, Cantodea states that "this once so loyal friend ..., he's not that welcome anymore." The song "Birth - Fiendish Figuration" was re-recorded for this album, while "May I kiss your Wound ?" would be re-recorded for "Songs from the inverted Womb".

In 2004, The inexperienced Spiral Traveller was re-issued with entirely new artwork, including radically new art and liner notes. The new artwork emulates a tourism package, including a passport and the photographs from the older version encapsulated in Polaroid borders. The back cover also featured a mock advertisement for the Synchro-Box, quoted to be "the best device to travel the continuum".

She rerecorded some songs from this album on her 2018 album The Spiral Sacrifice.

== Track listing ==
All tracks are written by Anna-Varney Cantodea

No.	Title	Length
1.	"Sylla'borêal (Embracing the Dead Prior to the Service)"	5:05
2.	"Question(s) Beyond Terms (Who Is Confronting the Impossible?)"	5:44
3.	"C'ayllagher a Dom'bhrail (There Is No Need to Remind Me)"	0:58
4.	"To a Loyal Friend" (anonymous 16th century Italian composition; arr. Sopor Aeternus)	6:58
5.	"Never Trust the Obvious (or: The Innocence of Devils)"	6:52
6.	"The Inexperienced Spiral Traveller: * a fragment *"	5:08
7.	"Memalon"	7:24
8.	"Memories Are Haunted Places (Birth - Fiendish Figuration, vers.)"	5:42
9.	"Die Widerspenstigkeit Unerwünschter Gedanken" ("The Recalcitrance of Unwanted Thoughts")	2:32
10.	"Synchronicity (to Saturn: Orion)"	0:27
11.	"Totenlicht (Infant in the Face of Time)" ("Deadlight")	6:02
12.	"Ein Freundliches Wort... (...hat Meine Seele Berührt.)" ("A kind word... (...has touched my soul.)")	5:11
13.	"Die Toten Kehren Wieder Mit dem Wind" ("The Dead Return again with the Wind")	2:55
14.	"May I Kiss Your Wound?"	5:47
15.	"Ein Gütiges Lächeln auf den Gesichtern der Toten..." ("A Kind Smile on the Faces of the Dead...")	5:08

== Personnel ==
- Una Fallada: Violin
- Matthias Eder: Cello
- Gerrit Fischer: Guitar
- Constanze Spengler: Lute
- Anna-Varney Cantodea: Vocals, all other instruments and programming
