= Songs from the Inverted Womb =

Songs from the inverted Womb

Studio album by Sopor Aeternus & the Ensemble of Shadows
- Released: Fall 2000
- Recorded: 1998–1999
- Genre: Neoclassical
- Length: 72:33
- Label: Apocalyptic Vision
- Producer: Sopor Aeternus

Sopor Aeternus & the Ensemble of Shadows chronology
Dead Lovers' Sarabande (Face Two) (1999)	Songs from the inverted Womb (2000)	Es reiten die Toten so schnell (2003)

Alternative covers
- Limited edition box cover

Alternative cover
- 2004 re-release cover

Songs from the Inverted Womb is the sixth album of darkwave band Sopor Aeternus & the Ensemble of Shadows, released in 2000. The album is dedicated to the "memory and resurrection" of Little Seven, a boy who died "at the age of six". A double vinyl edition and a CD boxed set were also released in limited quantities of 666 and 3,000 copies, respectively.

== Overview ==
Songs from the Inverted Womb builds on the chamber music-inspired sound of the Dead Lovers' Sarabande albums by adding more conventional song structures and by adding a live drummer. With even more expressive arrangements and enhanced songwriting, Inverted Womb shares many properties with progressive rock. Two songs from previous albums were re-recorded: "May I kiss your Wound ?", from The Inexperienced Spiral Traveller appears in a new arrangement; while "Résumé... -" is a dramatic re-working of "Time stands still... (...but stops for no-one)" from Sopor Aeternus' first album, "...Ich töte mich jedesmal aufs Neue, doch ich bin unsterblich, und ich erstehe wieder auf; in einer Vision des Untergangs...".

As the album is dedicated to "Little Seven", much of the lyrics revolves around finding and caring for the dead boy, as well as other dead children; most of the lyrical imagery revolves around familial plots in small towns in the Middle Ages. "Saturn devouring his Children" deals with necrophagia (the act of eating a corpse), while "There was a Country by the Sea" is an epic tale of finding a boy in a foreign land who has built a catacomb underneath his house; the boy explains to the protagonist that he was able to seal away his mother's bones using "jet-black granules" "piled up in a certain, specific form", but he remains ever vigilant in the tomb so that she will not return to life.

"Résumé... -" was used by Bam Margera in two of his films: Haggard: The Movie and CKY3; "Eldorado" also made an appearance in CKY3. Though not publicly mentioned by Cantodea or Apocalyptic Vision, the inclusion of "Résumé... -" on the Haggard soundtrack indicates that permission was granted for use of the two songs.

Songs from the inverted Womb was re-released on CD with newly packaged artwork in 2004.

== Track listing ==
All tracks are written by Anna-Varney Cantodea

No.	Title	Length
1.	"Introduction: Something Wicked this Way comes..."	4:42
2.	"Tales from the inverted Womb"	4:48
3.	"Do you know about the Water of Life ?"	4:49
4.	"...And Bringer of Sadness"	6:45
5.	"Résumé... -"	8:28
6.	"Totes Kind / Little dead Boy" ("Dead child / Little dead Boy")	7:18
7.	"May I kiss your Wound ?"	7:00
8.	"Saturn devouring his Children"	7:02
9.	"There was a Country by the Sea"	12:03
10.	"Little velveteen Knight"	5:52
11.	"Eldorado (by Edgar Allan Poe)"	3:42

== Personnel ==
- Katrin Ebert: Violin
- Martin Höfert: Cello
- Johannes Knirsch: Double bass
- Jutta Sinsel: Clarinet, oboe
- Guido Spitz: Bassoon, contrabassoon
- Alexander Gröb: Trumpet
- Carsten Weilnau: Trombone
- Eugene de la Fontaine: Tuba
- Simon-Tobias Ostheim: Drums, percussion
- Anna-Varney Cantodea: Vocals, all other instruments and programming
