= A Strange Thing to Say =

EP by Sopor Aeternus & the Ensemble of Shadows
- Released: 26 November 2010
- Genre: Neoclassical darkwave
- Length: 33:35
- Label: Apocalyptic Vision
- Producer: Sopor Aeternus, Patrick Damiani

Sopor Aeternus EP chronology
Flowers in Formaldehyde (2004)	A Strange Thing to Say (2010)	Children of the Corn (2011)

Professional ratings
Review scores
Source	Rating
Allmusic	5/5 stars

A Strange Thing to Say (also released as A Strange Thing 2 Say) is the third EP by Sopor Aeternus & the Ensemble of Shadows and is the first part of the trilogy A Triptychon of GHOSTS (or: El Sexorcismo de Anna-Varney Cantodea), which includes album Have You Seen This Ghost? and EP Children of the Corn. This is the first Sopor release since 2003's Es reiten die Toten so Schnell to not be produced by John A. Rivers. Instead, Patrick Damiani of the band Rome has co-produced the record.

The EP comes in 4 different versions: a CD packaged in a digibook format with a DVD containing the music video for "A Strange Thing to Say"; a special fan package; a 12-inch vinyl edition (with bonus track); and a standard CD release. The digibook edition comes with a 96-page booklet, a brooch, a magnet and a set of nine postcards; while the vinyl comes with an A4 12-page booklet. Each pressing of the limited editions are signed and numbered by Anna-Varney Cantodea herself.

== Track listing ==
CD pressing

All tracks are written by Anna-Varney Cantodea

No.	Title	Length
1.	"A Strange Thing to Say"	9:43
2.	"Polishing Silver"	5:11
3.	"The Urine Song"	4:18
4.	"Stains of You"	4:16
5.	"20,000 Leagues under the SEA (or: The History of Steampunk ... - abridged)"	6:39
6.	"Oh, Chimney Sweep"	3:38

Limited edition DVD
No.	Title	Length
1.	"A Strange Thing to Say (music video)"	10:00

Vinyl pressing

Side one
No.	Title	Length
1.	"A Strange Thing to Say"	9:43
2.	"Polishing Silver"	5:11
3.	"The Urine Song"	4:18

Side two
No.	Title	Length
1.	"Oh, Chimney Sweep"	3:38
2.	"Stains of You"	4:16
3.	"20,000 Leagues under the SEA (or: The History of Steampunk ... - abridged)"	6:39
4.	"Too-Tha-Loo"	1:19

== Personnel ==
- Patrick Damiani: Co-producer
- Thomas Haug: violin
- Tim Ströble: cello
- Wayne Coer: trumpet
- Fenton Bragg: trombone
- Eugene de la Fontaine: tuba
- Uta Ferson: clarinet
- Benjamin Dover: oboe
- Eric Chen: bassoon
- Burt Eerie: drums
- Terrence Bat: drums
- Anna-Varney Cantodea: All vocals and other instruments
