= Ehjeh Ascher Ehjeh =

EP by Sopor Aeternus & the Ensemble of Shadows
- Released: 1995
- Genre: Darkwave
- Length: 21:02
- Label: Apocalyptic Vision
- Producer: Sopor Aeternus

Sopor Aeternus EP chronology
Ehjeh Ascher Ehjeh (1995)	Flowers in Formaldehyde (1997)

Ehjeh Ascher Ehjeh (Hebrew: אהיה אשר אהיה; "I am that I am") is the first EP by Sopor Aeternus & the Ensemble of Shadows, and was released in 1995 as a companion to the album Todeswunsch - Sous le soleil de Saturne. Only 3,000 copies were pressed. The title of the EP is the response God gave to Moses when He was asked for His name, as seen in the Bible (Exodus 3:14.) The cover painting is a detail of Saint Jerome Writing by Michelangelo Merisi da Caravaggio.

The EP contains three songs featured on Todeswunsch - Sous le soleil de Saturne stripped of their backing tracks, bookended by the new song "anima" and a demo recording of "Tanz der Grausamkeit". "anima" began the recurring theme of sexual re-orientation in Anna-Varney Cantodea's lyrics, evident in the concluding line: "My true self is female how could I ever doubt..."

Ehjeh Ascher Ehjeh was re-released alongside Voyager - The Jugglers of Jusa and the demo tape Es reiten die Toten so schnell... for the first time as part of the rarities box set Like a Corpse Standing in Desperation, due to costly prices for cheap copies of the EP sold on eBay.

== Track listing ==
All tracks are written by Anna-Varney Cantodea.

No.	Title	Length
1.	"anima I"	0:50
2.	"Shadowsphere II"	2:31
3.	"Saltatio Crudelitatis" ("Dance of cruelty")	5:37
4.	"freitod-Phantasien" ("suicide-Fantasies")	3:33
5.	"anima II"	3:05
6.	"Tanz der Grausamkeit (demo)" ("Dance of cruelty (demo)")	5:27

== Personnel ==
- Varney: All vocals, instruments and programming
