= Bertram Shapleigh =

American classical composer

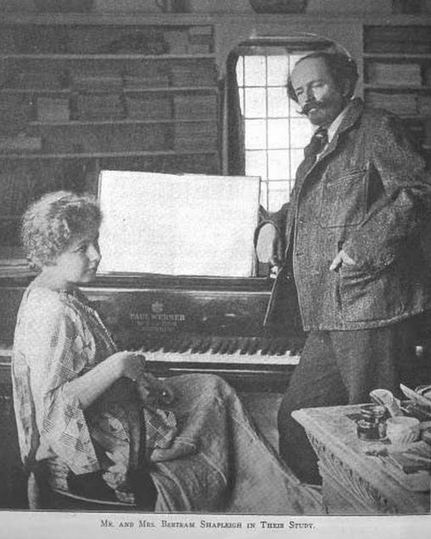
Bertram Shapleigh and his wife in their English home, "Weird Wood", from a 1907 publication. In the background, his library, which was lost in a fire some years later.

Bertram Lincoln Shapleigh (15 January 1871 – 2 July 1940) was an American composer, heavily interested in the culture of Asia.

== Education ==
He studied composition with G.E. Whiting and George Whitefield Chadwick at the New England Conservatory; graduating in 1891. He continued his studies with Edward MacDowell in the United States, and gave piano recitals and accompanied singers in the Boston area. He also studied in France and Germany.

A man of wide interests, he entered the Vermont Medical College, graduating with an MD degree in 1893.

== Career ==
He became a lecturer on the arts, but a developing concern with South Asian music that led him to give his attention fully to music and to composition. He played the piano and cello, and gave lecture-recitals on music history, Eastern music and Wagner’s operas. In 1898 he left the United States for Europe, living in Cologne and Brussels, eventually settling in Longfield, Kent in his home he named "Weird Wood". He became an editor for Breitkopf & Härtel. However, after his house, with his library of 7000 volumes, had been destroyed by fire, he returned to the USA in 1917, settling in Chicago and then Washington DC, to serve as an adviser to Breitkopf & Härtel and editor of the Concert Exchange. He lectured widely, wrote for magazines and newspapers, published three books of poetry and a novel, and composed numerous pieces in various forms. His works are in a Romantic style, sometimes using themes and timbres imitative of Indian music.

He was a Licentiate of the Royal Academy of Music, Associate of the Guildhall School of Music and Drama. He advertised for Dresden's Paul Werner pianos.

== Legacy ==
In 1887, as a satirical response to a rise in Baconian theory of Shakespeare authorship, Justin Winsor wrote a pamphlet titled "Was Shakespeare Shapleigh? A Correspondence in Two Entanglements". This pamphlet lampooned Ignatius Donnelly's The Great Cryptogram by proposing a fictional Sir William Shapleigh as author, who moved to America in 1636. Winsor's joke was given accidental credence and media attention when Bertram Shapleigh was mistaken for Shakespeare (and also Hall Caine) while vacationing in Morocco in 1904.

After his death in 1940, a Bertram Shapleigh Foundation was established in Washington, DC, and his manuscripts are deposited there. Cellist Paul Olefsky was its musical director; through it the foundation purchased Marie Roemaet Rosanoff's Stradivarius cello for Paul Olfesky's lifetime use, and sponsored many musical performances (including of Shapleigh's music), including the first Emanuel Feuermann Memorial International Cello Solo Competition.

== Selected compositions ==
Shapleigh wrote a number of orchestral works, some including choir; several operas; church music; many songs, and a string quartet, among other chamber works.

- Eldorado (published c.1900 by Edwin Ashdown), song setting of the Edgar Allan Poe poem
- Fitne's Song (Fitnes Gesang), words translated from German by Shapleigh's wife.
- Home Thoughts from Abroad, song setting of Robert Browning's poem.
- Metamorphosis for orchestra
- A Night in Kamtchatka (Eine Nacht auf Kamtschatka), words translated from German by Shapleigh's wife
- Ramayana, an Indian suite for soloists, iano, and orchestra
- The Raven, a cantata on Poe's poem
- The Regiment Passes (published c.1900 by Edwin Ashdown), words by Robert W. Chambers
- Rhapsody, for cello and piano
- Romance of the Year, op. 53 for four solo voices and piano, words by Shapleigh's wife. Twelve stanzas in the mood the twelve months of the year, in solo, duets, and quartets.
- The Song of the Dervishes, for chorus and orchestra, premiered in 1907 by the Wolverhampton Festival Choral Society.
- Three English Songs, op. 49. Settings of Hugh Clough's "Green Fields o' England" and Robert Browning's "O to be in England", and Wordsworth's "I travelled among unknown men"
- Three Little Songs
