= Les Fleurs du Mal (Sopor Aeternus & the Ensemble of Shadows album) =

Studio album by Sopor Aeternus & the Ensemble of Shadows
- Released: 13 April 2007
- Recorded: Late 2006
- Genre: Darkwave, gothic rock
- Label: Apocalyptic Vision
- Producer: Sopor Aeternus, John A. Rivers

Sopor Aeternus & the Ensemble of Shadows chronology
La Chambre d'Echo (2004)	Les Fleurs du Mal (2007)	Have You Seen This Ghost? (2011)

Singles from Les Fleurs du Mal
- 1. "In der Palästra" Released: 16 November 2007

Alternative cover
- Double vinyl edition

Professional ratings
Review scores
Source	Rating
Allmusic	3/5 stars

Les Fleurs du Mal – Die Blumen des Bösen (French and German for "The Flowers of Evil") is the ninth album by darkwave band Sopor Aeternus & the Ensemble of Shadows, and was released in 2007. Anna-Varney Cantodea has explained that the title is not a reference to Charles Baudelaire's 1857 collection of poetry of the same name, but that "it is related to Jean Genet's novel Notre Dame des Fleurs." A double vinyl edition and a CD boxed set were also released in limited quantities of 900 and 2,000 copies, respectively. The limited-edition pressings included a 40-page booklet of lyrics and illustrations, as well as a 112-page manga about the album.

"In der Palästra" received release as a DVD-single, and the album proper was introduced and promoted via a promotional video.

== Track listing ==
All tracks are written by Anna-Varney Cantodea.

No.	Title	Length
1.	"Architecture (All that's erected … are … walls)"	3:35
2.	"Always within the Hour"	8:29
3.	"In der Palästra" ("In the Palaestra")	7:13
4.	"A little Bar of Soap"	1:27
5.	"Bitter Sweet" (Bryan Ferry, Andy Mackay)	5:35
6.	"Our Lady of the Broken Hearts"	0:50
7.	"La Mort d'Arthur" ("The Death of Arthur")	3:01
8.	"The Simple Joys of Maidenhood"	3:42
9.	"Helvetia Sexualis"	10:08
10.	"Les Fleurs Du Mal" ("The flowers of evil")	8:29
11.	"Shave, if you love me"	6:50
12.	"Some Men are like Chocolate"	5:20
13.	"The Virgin Queen"	11:41

"La Mort d'Arthur" is based on the German translation of a Swedish children's song, "Små grodorna" ("Die kleinen Frösche")

== Personnel ==
- Naomi Koop: Violin
- Susannah Simmons: Violin
- Liz Hanks: Cello
- Miriam Hughes: Flute
- Andrew Piper: Clarinet
- Mike Davis: Oboe, cor anglais
- Doreena Gor: Bassoon
- Daniel Robson: Trumpet
- Fenton Bragg: Trombone
- Eugene de la Fontaine: Tuba
- Bert Eerie: Drums
- Terence Bat: Drums
- Choir of the Collegiate Church of St. Mary of Warwick: Vocals, backing vocals
- Anna-Varney Cantodea: Vocals, all other instruments and programming, Written lyrics and music
