= La Chambre d'Echo =

Studio album by Sopor Aeternus & the Ensemble of Shadows
- Released: 2004
- Genre: Darkwave
- Length: 71:58
- Label: Apocalyptic Vision
- Producer: Sopor Aeternus, John A. Rivers

Sopor Aeternus & the Ensemble of Shadows chronology
Es reiten die Toten so schnell (2003)	La Chambre d'Echo (2004)	Les Fleurs du Mal (2007)

Alternative cover
- Double vinyl edition

La Chambre d'Echo – Where the Dead Birds Sing is the eighth album by darkwave band Sopor Aeternus & the Ensemble of Shadows, and was released in 2004. La Chambre d'Echo saw the return of synthesizers and drum machines, while still focusing on chamber music-inspired darkwave music. John A. Rivers returned to produce the album alongside Anna-Varney Cantodea. An accompanying EP, Flowers in Formaldehyde, was released later that year. The album was introduced and promoted via a promotional video.

== Overview ==
La Chambre d'Echo was heavily inspired by Der Narrenturm, an old Austrian hospital and psychiatric ward that has since become a museum of diseases, mutations and abnormalities of the human body. As a result, the lyrical focus is that of hospitals and medical care in general. The album artwork, in part, features Cantodea transforming into a large worm-like creature, reminiscent of the artwork for Marilyn Manson's Antichrist Superstar.

The album featured prevalent use of synthesizers and drum machines, reflecting Sopor Aeternus' first album, Ich töte mich....

The packaging for La Chambre d'Echo is elaborate and extensive. The standard edition comes inside a 128-page, A4-sized book containing photography by Joachim Luetke, as well as handwritten lyrics provided by Cantodea. The photoshoot for the album was taken inside and around Der Narrenturm. The boxed set edition came in a linen-bound box and also included bookmarks, postcards, a translation guide and a pamphlet advertising Der Narrenturm; the included book was enclosed and sealed in an envelope. Curiously, the cover of the vinyl edition featured an image taken for the previous album, Es reiten die Toten so schnell (or "The Vampyre Sucking at His Own Vein'"). The vinyl edition features its own abridged version of the book as well as a poster. A postcard was included with the album, offering fans the chance to pre-order Flowers in Formaldehyde.

== Track listing ==
All tracks are written by Anna-Varney Cantodea

No.	Title	Length
1.	"The Encoded Cloister"	4:44
2.	"Backbone Practise"	6:00
3.	"Idleness & Consequence"	5:08
4.	"Beyond the Wall of Sleep"	3:31
5.	"Imhotep (Schwarzer Drache mischt einen Sturm)" ("Imhotep (Black Dragon Mixes Up a Storm)")	4:48
6.	"Hearse-shaped Basins of Darkest Matter"	3:57
7.	"Interlude - The Quiet Earth"	8:34
8.	"We Have a Dog to Exercise"	5:50
9.	"The Lion's Promise"	4:52
10.	"Leeches & Deception"	9:11
11.	"The Skeletal Garden"	4:05
12.	"Feed the Birds"	0:21
13.	"Consolatrix Has Left the Building"	4:34
14.	"Day of the Dead"	6:23

== Personnel ==
- Chris Wilson: Violin
- Susannah Simmons: Violin
- Liz Hanks: Cello
- Miriam Hughes: Flute
- Tonia Price: Clarinet
- Andrew Pettitt: Oboe
- Doreena Gor: Bassoon
- James Cunningham: Trumpet
- Tim Barber: Trumpet
- Julian Turner: Trombone
- Anthony Bartley: Tuba
- Paul Brook: Drums
- Anna-Varney Cantodea: Vocals, all other instruments and programming
