= Rising Again =

Live album by Donovan
- Released: 22 May 2001
- Recorded: 1971–1981
- Genre: folk
- Length: 95:41
- Label: Pilot Records
- Producer: Unknown

Donovan chronology
Sutras (1996)	Rising Again (2001)	Greatest Hits Live: Vancouver 1986 (2001)

"Atlantis"
- Superior Records, NL

Rising Again is an expanded version of the 1990 live album Rising from Scottish singer-songwriter Donovan. It was released in the UK (Pilot PLO 59) on 22 May 2001.

== History ==
Throughout the 1990s, numerous reissues and edited versions of Donovan's 1990 live album Rising appeared. None of these versions contained the original title or artwork, and many did not have the original track order. After over ten years of these releases, Pilot Records acquired the rights to the songs from Rising in the UK.

Instead of simply reissuing Rising, Pilot Records recognized that the rights to the Mellow Records songs also gave them access to numerous unreleased live recordings recorded by Donovan in the 1980s. They titled the subsequent release of these tracks Rising Again in recognition of the original album, and added eleven previously unreleased tracks taken from the same concerts.

== Repackaged versions ==
Professional ratings
Review scores
Source	Rating
Allmusic	3/5 stars

On 12 November 2002, Superior Records (Netherlands, Superior 540777) issued Donovan's album as Atlantis for the European continent market. The album featured a different cover. It should not be confused with Atlantis, the repackaged version of Rising, released in 1994.

== Track listing ==
All tracks by Donovan Leitch, except where noted. This CD features one never-before released composition, "Mr. Flute Man". "Love Will Find a Way", "Stealing", "Young But Growing" were first released on Rising.

=== Disc one ===
1. "Jennifer Juniper" – 2:00
2. "Catch the Wind" – 3:41
3. "Josie" – 3:24
4. "Hurdy Gurdy Man" – 6:04
5. "Sunshine Superman" – 3:53
6. "Colours" – 2:51
7. "There Is a Mountain" – 3:06
8. "Mellow Yellow" – 3:24
9. "Sadness" – 2:49
10. "Universal Soldier" (Buffy Sainte-Marie) – 2:44
11. "Cosmic Wheels" – 3:42
12. "Isle of Islay" – 2:27
13. "Trucking Your Blues Away" (Blind Boy Fuller) – 2:22 ()
14. "Wear Your Love Like Heaven" – 2:17
15. "Love Will Find a Way" – 2:44
16. "The Pee Song" – 1:43

=== Disc two ===
1. "Sailing Homeward" – 3:27
2. "Mr. Flute Man" (new composition) – 2:11
3. "Laléna" – 3:13
4. "Young Girl Blues" – 5:05
5. "Young But Growing" (traditional; arranged by Donovan) – 3:42
6. "Stealing" (traditional; arranged by Donovan) – 4:17
7. "Season of the Witch" – 3:39
8. "Atlantis" – 3:05
9. "Colours" – 2:21
10. "To Susan on the West Coast Waiting" – 1:39
11. "Catch the Wind" – 2:40
12. "Make Up Your Mind to Be Happy" – 5:27
13. "Happiness Runs" – 5:33

All tracks, except for "Love Will Find a Way", "Stealing", "Young But Growing" and "Mr. Flute Man" were previously released in studio versions: "Sadness" on 7-Tease, "Isle of Islay" on A Gift from a Flower to a Garden, "The Pee Song" on H.M.S. Donovan, "Trucking Your Blues Away" released as "Keep on Truckin'" on What's Bin Did and What's Bin Hid, "The Pee Song" on H.M.S. Donovan, "Sailing Homeward" on Essence to Essence, "To Susan On The West Coast Waiting"and "Happiness Runs" on Barabajagal, "Make Up Your Mind to Be Happy" was released as "Life is a Merry-Go-Round" on Essence to Essence.
