= Es reiten die Toten so schnell... =

Demo album by Sopor Aeternus & the Ensemble of Shadows
- Released: 1989
- Recorded: 1989
- Genre: Dark wave
- Length: 29:28
- Label: self-released
- Producer: Sopor Aeternus

Sopor Aeternus & the Ensemble of Shadows chronology
Es reiten die Toten so schnell... (1989)	...Ich töte mich... (1992)

Es reiten die Toten so schnell... (German: The Dead ride so fast...) is the first demo tape by darkwave band Sopor Aeternus & the Ensemble of Shadows'. Es reiten... was issued in a hand-numbered limited edition of 50 copies in 1989. A further two demo tapes, Rufus and Till Time and Times Are Done, have not yet been released in any format. All three have been referred to as the "Undead-Trilogy".

== Overview ==
Es reiten... was recorded by Anna-Varney Cantodea (then known simply as Varney) and her then-companion Holger; they would come together only once a month to record and edit the tape until its conclusion. Cantodea thanked Holger greatly for his help in creating Es reiten..., especially since the two of them were not financially successful at the time.

The music and lyrics provided an introduction to what would be seen as the "signature" sound of Sopor Aeternus: Renaissance- and Baroque-inspired music, accompanied by Cantodea's voice and a drum machine. As was the case with her early recordings, Cantodea would only record the vocals once, and would not edit the performance later. "Reprise" consists solely of a spoken line during the bridge of "Dead Souls". The majority of the lyrical content in this early phase was vampirism, with songs such as "Stake of my Soul" and "The Feast of Blood" being prime examples. Cantodea discussed the subject matter in 1992:

"We recorded Es reiten die Toten so schnell... to express the deep bounds towards, well, to our beings suffering their immortal lives in eternal darkness. The lyrics of the Undead-Trilogy allude to vampires only at first sight for they are a symbol of tragedy, damnation and all of that..."

The material from Es reiten... would be entirely re-arranged and re-recorded for the later album "Es reiten die Toten so schnell" (or: the Vampyre sucking at his own Vein), while the original release would be re-issued alongside "Voyager - The Jugglers of Jusa" and Ehjeh Ascher Ehjeh in the rarities box set Like a Corpse standing in Desperation. The original demo appears on the first disc of the collection in a remastered format, removing tape hiss and improving dynamics; the facsimile cassette included in the set contains the songs as originally mixed.

== Track listing ==
All tracks are written by Sopor Aeternus. Both sides contain the same songs

Cassette, sides A & B
No.	Title	Length
1.	"Omen Sinsitrum" ("Inauspicious omen")	2:15
2.	"Dead Souls"	6:41
3.	"Stake of my Soul"	1:14
4.	"Beautiful Thorn"	5:09
5.	"Baptisma"	5:01
6.	"The Feast of Blood"	4:07
7.	"Sopor Fratrem Mortis Est" ("Sleep is the brother of Death")	4:55
8.	"Reprise" (unlisted track)	0:16

== Personnel ==
- Varney: vocals and instruments
- Holger: instruments

== See also ==
- Es reiten die Toten so schnell (or: the Vampyre sucking at his own Vein)
