= Have You Seen This Ghost? =

Studio album by Sopor Aeternus and The Ensemble of Shadows
- Released: 2011
- Recorded: 2010
- Genre: Neoclassical darkwave
- Length: 74:21
- Label: Apocalyptic Vision
- Producer: Anna-Varney Cantodea

Sopor Aeternus and The Ensemble of Shadows chronology
Les Fleurs du Mal (2007)	Have You Seen This Ghost? (2011)	Poetica (All Beauty Sleeps) (2013)

Professional ratings
Review scores
Source	Rating
Allmusic	3/5 stars

Have You Seen This Ghost? is the tenth official studio album from Sopor Aeternus and The Ensemble of Shadows and the second part of the trilogy A Triptychon of GHOSTS (or El Sexorcismo de Anna-Varney Cantodea), which includes the EPs A Strange Thing to Say and Children of the Corn.

The album was first released in April 2011 in two different forms. One of which was a 128-page hardcover book format (limited to 1999 copies) which contained the album and a DVD for the music video of "It Is Safe To Sleep Alone." The other, a 2-LP vinyl (limited to 693 copies) on purple colored wax. Both limited editions are signed and numbered by Anna-Varney Contodea herself. The standard jewel Case Edition was released in August 2011.

== Track listing ==
All tracks are written by Anna-Varney Cantodea except where noted

No.	Title	Length
1.	"I Don't Believe in Ghosts"	4:17
2.	"One Day My Prince Will Come"	7:20
3.	"Cornucopia d'Amour (Füllhorn der Liebe)" ("Cornucopia of love")	4:29
4.	"It Is Safe to Sleep Alone" (Marianne Faithfull, Angelo Badalamenti, Frank McGuiness)	5:57
5.	"Hello" (Lionel Richie)	7:58
6.	"At the Stroke of Midnight Gently"	1:44
7.	"Starlight Seen Through Veils of Tears"	6:37
8.	"Powder"	5:39
9.	"Angel of the Golden Fountain"	6:03
10.	"Where the Ancient Laurel Grows"	5:54
11.	"I Fell for One (who loved me not)"	2:34
12.	"Holding Out for a Hero" (Dean Pitchford, Jim Steinman)	6:40
13.	"The Hours of Sadness"	9:25

== Personnel ==
Sopor Aeternus

- Anna-Varney Cantodea: vocals, all other instruments, programming, mixing

Additional musicians

- Thomas Haug: violin
- Tim Ströble: cello
- Fenton Bragg: trombone
- Wayne Coer: trumpet
- Eugene de la Fontaine: tuba
- Uta Ferson: clarinet
- Benjamin Dover: oboe
- Eric Chen: bassoon
- Olegg Mancovicz: balalaika, banjo
- Burt Eerie: drums
- Terence Bat: drums
- Patrick Damiani: recording, mixing, engineering
