= Carmelo Patrono =

Italian production designer and art director

- Occupations: Production designer Art director
- Years active: 1966-Present

Carmelo Patrono is an Italian production designer and art director. He was nominated for an Academy Award in the category Best Art Direction for the film Brother Sun, Sister Moon.

== Selected filmography ==
- Brother Sun, Sister Moon (1973)
