= One Night in Time =

Studio album by Donovan
- Released: 1993
- Recorded: 1993
- Genre: Folk
- Producer: Bob Rose

Donovan chronology
Rising (1990)	One Night in Time (1993)	Sutras (1996)

One Night in Time is an unofficial release of studio recordings from Scottish singer-songwriter Donovan. His 18th studio album, it was distributed through the fanzine Donovan's Friends in 1993 on cassette tape.

== History ==
After his 1984 album Lady of the Stars failed to meet success in both the US and UK, Donovan temporarily retired from recording studio albums. In 1990, Donovan's 1960's albums were reissued on CD for the first time. His 1990 live album Rising and the 1992 Epic Records boxed set Troubadour: The Definitive Collection 1964-1976 were also bringing Donovan's music back into record stores.

Although this renewed interest in Donovan's music grew over the next few years, in 1993 he was still without a record label in the US or UK. The album was only released on cassette tape.

== Track listing ==
All tracks by Donovan Leitch, except where noted.

=== Original album ===
1. "One Night in Time" (Donovan Leitch, Warwick Embury)
2. "Dear Heart"
3. "You Got Me Reeling"
4. "The Sensitive Kind" (J. J. Cale)
5. "Runaway"
6. "When All the World is Young"
7. "You Do Belong (Teenage Suicide)"
8. "What's a Girl..."
9. "Forever Your Love"
10. "There Are No Roads"
