= Children of the Corn (album) =

EP by Sopor Æternus & the Ensemble of Shadows
- Released: 2011
- Recorded: 2010–2011
- Genre: Darkwave
- Length: 39:32
- Label: Apocalyptic Vision
- Producer: Sopor Æternus

Sopor Aeternus EP chronology
A Strange Thing to Say (2010)	Children of the Corn (2011)

Professional ratings
Review scores
Source	Rating
Allmusic	4.5/5 stars

Children of the Corn is the fourth EP from Sopor Æternus & the Ensemble of Shadows and the third and final part of the trilogy A Triptychon of GHOSTS (or: El Sexorcismo de Anna-Varney Cantodea), following EP A Strange Thing to Say and album Have You Seen This Ghost?.

The album was released in November 2011 in two different formats: in compact disc format with a hardcover photo book, coin an exclusive T-shirt (limited to 1999 copies); and on 12-inch vinyl with two posters and a different, exclusive T-shirt (limited to 693 copies.) Both editions are signed and numbered by Anna-Varney Cantodea herself.

== Track listing ==
All tracks are written by Anna-Varney Cantodea.

No.	Title	Length
1.	"Children of the Corn"	7:19
2.	"Bis zum Hahnenschrei" ("Before the cockcrow")	5:35
3.	"Cornflowers"	5:50
4.	"The Curse of the Mummy"	4:02
5.	"Night of the Scarecrow"	4:44
6.	"To walk behind the Rows"	6:14
7.	"Harvest Moon"	5:48

== Personnel ==
- Thomas Haug: Violin (1–3)
- Nikos Mavridis: Violin (4–7)
- Tim Ströble: Cello
- Uta Ferson: Clarinet
- Eric Cheg: Bassoon
- Olegg Mancovicz: Oud
- Eugene de la Fountaine: Tuba
- Burt Eerie: Drums
- Terrence Bat: Drums
- Patrick Damiani: Recording, Mixing, Engineering
- Robin Schmidt: Mastering
- Anna-Varney Cantodea: Vocals, All other instruments, Programming, Mixing
