= Lorenzo Mongiardino =

Italian architect

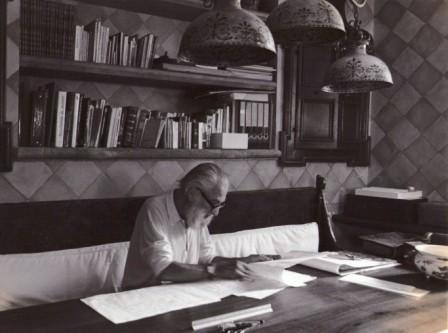
- Renzo Mongiardino in 1996
- Born: 12 May 1916; Genoa, Italy
- Died: 16 January 1998 (aged 81); Milan, Italy
- Other name: Renzo Mongiardino
- Education: Polytechnic University of Milan
- Occupations: Architect, interior designer; production designer
- Years active: 1944–1998

Lorenzo "Renzo" Mongiardino (Italian pronunciation: [(lo)ˈrɛntso mondʒarˈdiːno]; 12 May 1916 – 16 January 1998) was an Italian architect, interior designer, and production designer. He was nominated for two Academy Awards in the category Best Art Direction.

== Biography ==
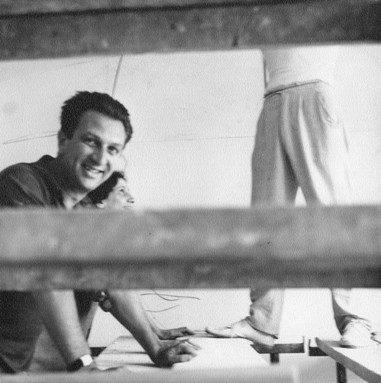
Renzo Mongiardino with Lila de Nobili, early 70's

In 1936, Renzo Mongiardino moved from his native Genoa to Milan to study architecture; in 1942, he graduated from the Polytechnic University, together with Giò Ponti. Beginning in 1944, Mongiardino collaborated with the design magazine Domus, writing many articles. During this period he also began his multifaceted career, focusing primarily on the creation of residential and theatre environments. In the early fifties, Mongiardino began to establish himself as an architect, working from his home and studio in central Milan, on the elegant Via Bianca Maria.

Mongiardino designed residential interiors for an international clientele that included collectors, business-people and other prominent figures. His projects included Daylesford House in Gloucestershire for Baron Hans Heinrich Thyssen-Bornemisza, as well as interiors for clients including Aristotle Onassis, Gianni Agnelli and Marella Agnelli, Lee Radziwill and Stanisław Albrecht Radziwiłł, Gianni Versace, Edmond Safra and Lily Safra, Princess Firyal of Jordan, Valentino Garavani. His clients also included members of the Rothschild and Hearst families. From the 1950s, Mongiardino also worked as a production designer for theatre and film, collaborating with directors including Franco Zeffirelli, Peter Hall, Giancarlo Menotti and Raymond Rouleau.

In 1993, Mongiardino's monograph “Roomscapes” was published, providing an overview of his career, including photographs and illustrations of some of his significant projects.

After the arson of theatre "La Fenice" in 1996, Gae Aulenti assigned Mongiardino the project for the interior theatre refurbishment, a project which he was not able to complete.

Mongiardino died in Milan on 16 January 1998.

== Style ==
The years of Mongiardino's debut are those of the Modern Movement, but he resisted this new wave, fearing its effects, and perceiving an intrinsic lack of feeling. Instinct took him elsewhere, to seek the harmony of the antique that draws on and re-invents itself in a completely new way. The private nature of his projects and their nature, in the sense that they are an ends unto themselves, and will most likely not survive beyond the lives of their owners, brings with it the risk that Mongiardino's name may not correspond to anything definite, but true only as evocation of the rich and famous world.

There are various public works of Mongiardino, including two buildings built in Milan (in Via Donizetti and in via Borgonuovo), the restoration of hotels (the lobby bar at The Carlyle in New York, The Hotel Kulm in St. Moritz, The Plaza in Rome), as well as the restaurant ("Da Giacomo" in Milan) and several shops, including Sabbadini Jewelers on Milan's Via Montenapoleone. Mongiardino's public works are the exception to the primary concentration of his research, which focused almost exclusively on the preparation of domestic spaces.

Before Mongiardino, houses were built in a particular historical style. Mongiardino revolutionized this methodology. He writes: "The houses are furnished, are created considering the structure, the skeleton, the intrinsic beauty, when there is. We believe we can invent a new house, a universal model that could be replicated identically in Naples as in Stockholm. But the house is not an invention, it is always the same shelter that man needs because he is tired, because he's hungry, because he has to sleep. Older houses were built on the extent of these practical needs, they expressed the authenticity of the goods and used the same limits imposed by available materials and technologies called for the pursuit of beauty in function. Skilled creator of spectacular spaces, he has been able to juxtapose ordinary objects and antiques, in a masterly game of fabrics or painted, and sculptured panels and a range of trompe-l'œil, whereby he obtained masterpieces with poor materials.

Fundamental in his work, however, is the determination of space, the search for a balance of proportions that must precede the decoration. Precisely this is his book "Roomscapes”. Only later Mongiardino inserted, with the sensitivity set designer, fakes and real objects presented without any hierarchy of values in a setting in which each subject was taking its natural space.

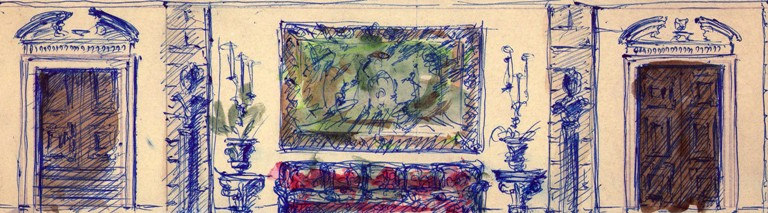
Project of Renzo Mongiardino for a living room (1)

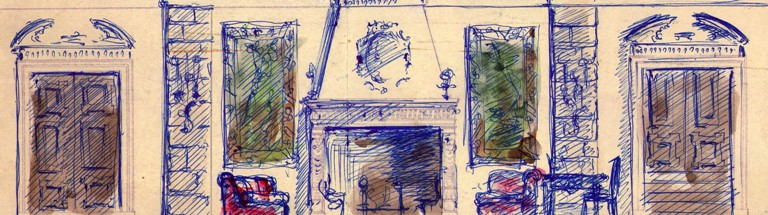
Project of Renzo Mongiardino for a living room (2)

== Set designs for theatre ==
- "Don Pasquale" (1958) Directed by Franco Zeffirelli, Teatro Carlo Felice, Genoa
- "Two Gentlemen of Verona" (1960) Directed by Peter Hall, Shakespeare Memorial Theatre, Stratford-upon-Avon
- "Ruy Blas" (1960) directed by Raymond Rouleau, Comedie Française Paris
- "Tosca" (1964) directed by Franco Zeffirelli, Covent Garden, London
- "L'occasione fa il ladro" (1962), directed by Beppe Menegatti, Teatro alla Piccola Scala, Milan
- "The Great Gala" (1962), directed by Franco Zeffirelli, Royal Albert Hall, London
- "Non si sa come" (1966–67), directed by Luigi Squarzina, Teatro Stabile in Genoa
- "Il Furioso all'isola di san Domingo" (1967), directed by Giancarlo Menotti, Festival of Two Worlds, Spoleto
- "Nutcracker" (1967), choreography by Rudolf Nureyev, Kungliga Operan, Stockholm
- "Don Pasquale" (1968), directed by Giancarlo Menotti, Staatsoper, Hamburg
- "L'uomo più importante" (1971), directed by Giancarlo Menotti, Teatro Verdi, Trieste
- "Traviata" (1972) directed by Giancarlo Menotti, Teatro La Fenice, Venice
- Un Ballo in Maschera (1972) directed by Franco Zeffirelli, Teatro alla Scala, Milan
- "Yevgeny Onegin" (1996) directed by Giancarlo Menotti, Festival of Two Worlds, Spoleto

== Film sets ==
- "The Taming of the Shrew" (1967), directed by Franco Zeffirelli. Nominated for Academy Awards for Best Art Direction
- "Romeo and Juliet" (1968), directed by Franco Zeffirelli
- "Brother Sun, Sister Moon" (1972), directed by Franco Zeffirelli. Nominated for Academy Awards for Best Art Direction
- "Beyond Good and Evil" (1977), directed by Liliana Cavani

== Design objects ==
- Door handles etc., for the firm "Valli & Valli," M98 series
- Designed and re-designed Rattan and rattan-core sofas, chairs and armchairs for the company "Vittorio Bonacina", series Fidia, Crochet, Lisippo, 978, Arpa, Hall, Bourlon, Talide, Champagne Bar, Violet, Radiant, Elle, Astrea, Brando and Bramdo Bicolor, Valentino, Pan-Cake, Pashmina.

== Selected filmography ==
Mongiardino was nominated for two Academy Awards for Best Art Direction:

- The Taming of the Shrew (1967)
- Brother Sun, Sister Moon (1972)
