= Graham Faulkner =

British former actor

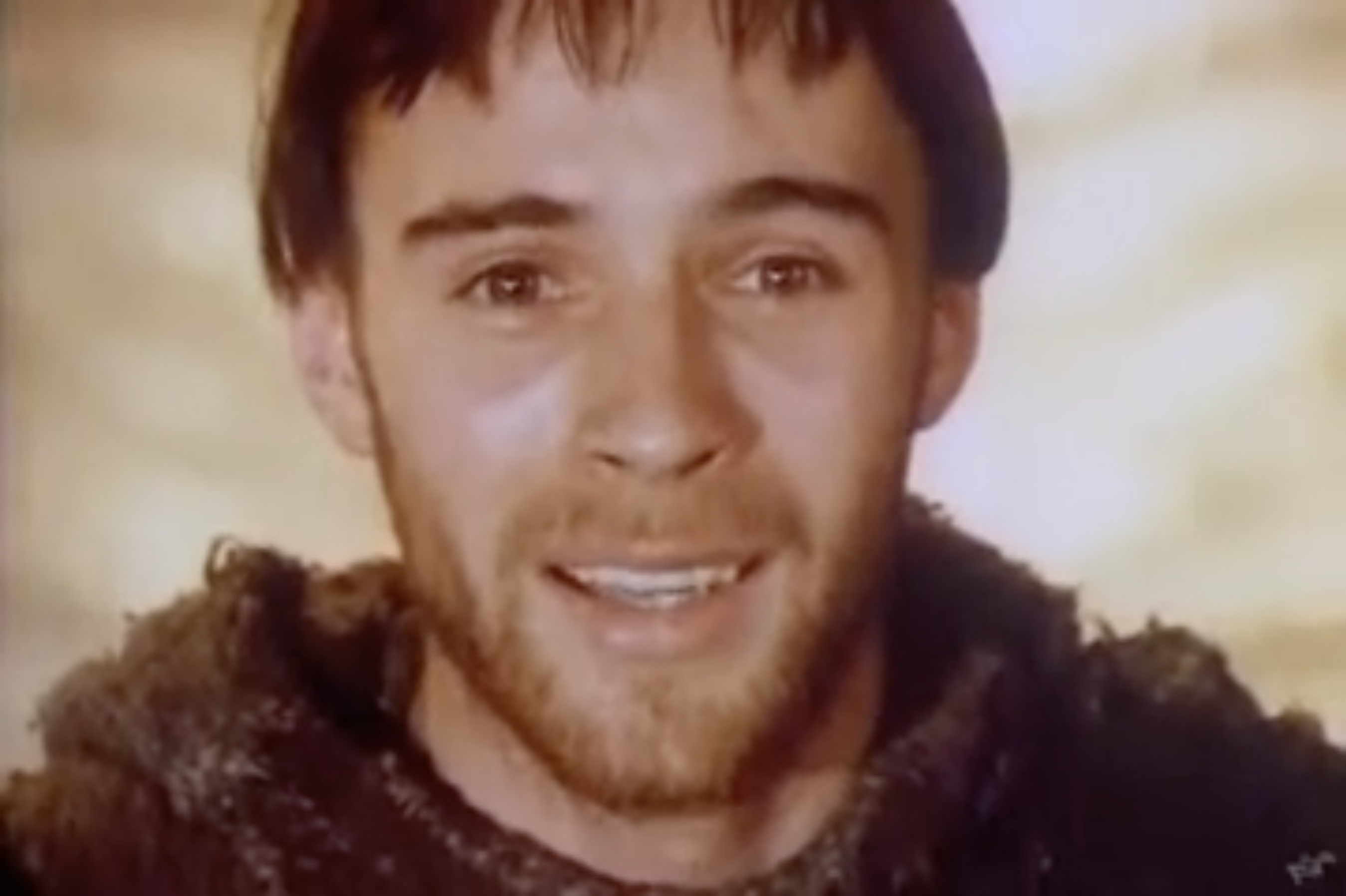
- Faulkner in Brother Sun, Sister Moon
- Born: 26 September 1947 (age 78); London, UK

Graham Faulkner (born 26 September 1947 in London, UK) is a former British actor.

His first and best known role was as Francis of Assisi in Franco Zeffirelli's Brother Sun, Sister Moon (1972). After that, he virtually retired from acting. He played a small number of very minor roles, but has not been involved in film or television since 1984. He left acting to find stable employment to support his family and has worked for a private British bank.

== Filmography ==
- Brother Sun, Sister Moon 1972, (Francis of Assisi)
- Notorious Woman 1974, (TV Series) (Maurice)
- Angels 1975, (TV series), 1 episode: "Saturday Night"
- Dickens of London 1976, (Frederick Dickens) - TV series
- Priest of Love 1981, (Cornish Farmer)
- The Cleopatras 1983, (TV Series) (Apollodorus)
- Shroud for a Nightingale 1984, TV Series (Staff Nurse)
