= Rising (Donovan album) =

Live album by Donovan
- Released: November 1990
- Recorded: 1971–1981
- Genre: Folk
- Length: 62:01
- Label: Permanent Records (UK)
- Producer: Patrick Hehir

Donovan chronology
Lady of the Stars (1984)	Rising (1990)	One Night in Time (1993)

The Classics Live
- US release (Great Northern Arts, Ltd.)

25 Years in Concert
- Netherlands release (CD + LP)

Rising is the third live album, and twentieth album overall, from Scottish singer-songwriter Donovan. It was released on Permanent Records in 1990 (LP and CD). The live versions of Donovan's hits guaranteed that Rising would receive a release in both the United States and United Kingdom. Rising was retitled The Classics Live in the United States, 25 Years in Concert in Europe and Atlantis in the UK for marketing reasons. Since the release of Rising, there have been many reissues of the songs from the album under many different titles.

Rising was supposedly recorded sporadically from 1982 through 1986 at various live concerts during different world tours. However, after careful research the sources of these recordings are found to be a U.S. tour in 1971, concerts in Osaka in 1973, and the Cambridge Folk Festival of 1981.

== History ==
Although Donovan's albums had all but disappeared from the British and American markets by the early 1980s, his live appearances still attracted large audiences. Donovan toured constantly throughout this time, performing throughout North America and Europe.

The setlists from these shows features a mixture of Donovan's international hits from the 1960s and relatively more obscure tracks from his later albums. Like most of Donovan's live performances, there is sparse instrumentation accompanying Donovan's vocals, including flute, acoustic guitar, bass. Rising features two traditional songs ("Young But Growing" and "Stealing") and one original song ("Love Will Find a Way") that were not released on any previous Donovan album.

In 2001, Rising was expanded to a two-CD set as Rising Again.

== Track listing ==
All tracks by Donovan Leitch, except where noted.

"Young But Growing", "Stealing" and "Love Will Find a Way" are previously unreleased compositions. All recordings previously unreleased except for "Sadness" and "Universal Soldier" (see Live in Japan: Spring Tour 1973)

=== Original album ===
The vinyl release has 15 tracks, the CD release has 18 tracks

1. "Jennifer Juniper" – 2:25
2. "Catch the Wind" – 2:50
3. "Hurdy Gurdy Man" – 6:04
4. "Sunshine Superman" – 3:57
5. "Sadness" – 2:56
6. "Universal Soldier" (Buffy Sainte-Marie) – 2:49
7. "Cosmic Wheels" (CD bonus track) – 4:05
8. "Atlantis" – 3:06
9. "Wear Your Love Like Heaven" – 2:17
10. "To Susan On the West Coast Waiting" – 1:39
11. "Colours" – 2:29
12. "Young Girl Blues" – 5:01
13. "Young But Growing" (traditional; arranged by Donovan) (CD bonus track) – 3:41
14. "Stealing" (traditional; arranged by Donovan) – 4:10
15. "Sailing Homeward" – 3:04
16. "Love Will Find a Way" – 2:44
17. "Laléna" – 3:16
18. "Make Up Your Mind" (CD bonus track) – 5:28

== Further song information ==
- "Sadness" (the studio version was released on 7-Tease, November 1974)
- "Young Girl Blues" (the studio version was released on Mellow Yellow, March 1967)
- "Sailing Homeward" (the studio version was released on Essence to Essence, December 1973)
- "Make Up Your Mind" (The studio version of was released as "Life is a Merry-Go-Round" on Essence to Essence)

== Personnel ==
- Donovan – Guitar, Harmonica, composer, Vocals
- Patrick Hehir – Producer, engineer
- Paul Horn – Clarinet, Flute, Saxophone
- Peter Mark – Viola
- Barbara Nessim – Illustrations, Cover Design
- Danny Thompson – Bass

Mixed by Richard Nathan

== Release history ==
A list of reissues

Region	Date	Title	Label	Catalog
UK	November 1990	Rising	Permanent Records	PERM LP 2 (LP)/ PERM CD 2 (CD) / PERM MC 2 (MC)
US	November 1990	The Classics Live	Great Northern Arts, Ltd. (New York City)	GNA 61007-002
Netherlands	1991	25 Years in Concert	Dino Music	DNCD 1253 (CD)/DNLP 1253 (Vinyl LP)
	1994	Donovan in Concert (last two tracks missing)	Digimode Entertainment	
Belgium	1994	In Concert	All at Once	HP 93432
UK	1994	Atlantis	K Point Gold	1621.1009-2
	10 July 2001	Colours: Live in Concert	Music Deluxe	6
	7 April 1998	The Very Best of Donovan	Artful Records	Artful 5
Germany	1995	Live	Mastertone	CD 10045
	19 August 1997	Performance	Beacon	51584
	21 October 1997	Greatest Hits: Acoustic Live	Laserlight Records	12976
	3 November 1998	Cosmic Wheels	Mastertone Records	8354
