= Mitternacht - The Dark Night of the Soul =

Studio album by Sopor Æternus & the Ensemble of Shadows
- Released: 2014
- Recorded: 2013–2014
- Genre: Darkwave
- Length: 68:24
- Label: Apocalyptic Vision
- Producer: Sopor Aeternus

Sopor Æternus & the Ensemble of Shadows chronology
Poetica (All Beauty Sleeps) (2013)	Mitternacht - The Dark Night of the Soul (2014)	The Spiral Sacrifice (2018)

Mitternacht - The Dark Night of the Soul is the 12th album by Sopor Aeternus & the Ensemble of Shadows. The album was released in September 2014 in two different formats: in compact disc format with 36-page hardcover book, and an exclusive T-shirt (limited to 1999 copies); and on 12" vinyl with a 28-page booklet in 12" format and two posters (limited to 890 copies). Both editions are signed and numbered by Anna-Varney Cantodea herself and feature illustrations by Anastasiya Chyringa, a fan whose artwork Anna-Varney encountered on Tumblr.

The song "La prima vez" is a cover of a traditional Sephardic song.

== Track listing ==
All tracks are written by Anna-Varney Cantodea except where noted

No.	Title	Length
1.	"Mitternacht"	2:22
2.	"Beautiful"	8:37
3.	"La prima vez" (Traditional)	5:33
4.	"Bang-Bang" (Sonny Bono)	7:17
5.	"The Boy Has Built a Catacomb"	2:16
6.	"Carnival of Souls" (Verne Langdon)	3:09
7.	"Confessional"	5:58
8.	"Under His Light"	7:00
9.	"You Cannot Make Him Love You"	2:04
10.	"Into the Night" (Angelo Badalamenti, David Lynch)	6:01
11.	"If You Could Only Read My Mind"	6:03
12.	"It's Just That My Sadness"	4:00
13.	"Under His Light (2)"	1:19
14.	"Miniature"	6:45

== Personnel ==
Sopor Aeternus & The Ensemble of Shadows

- Anna-Varney Cantodea - vocals, all other instruments, programming, mixing

Additional Musicians

- Nikos Mavridis – violin
- Tim Ströble - cello
- Sebastian Jülich: bassoon
- Isabel Funke - clarinet
- Viola Schwartzkopff - oboe
- Jonas Schira - cornet
- Michael Fütterer - trombone
- Patrick Chirilus-Bruckner - tuba
- Patrick Damiani - bass, lute, recording, mixing
- Marcel Millot - drums
- Robin Schmidt - mastering
