= Brother Sun, Sister Moon (album) =

Studio album by Donovan
- Released: 2004
- Recorded: 2004
- Genre: Folk music
- Length: 28:16
- Label: Donovan Discs

Donovan chronology
Sixty Four (2004)	Brother Sun, Sister Moon (2004)	Beat Cafe (2004)

Brother Sun, Sister Moon is the 22nd studio album and 27th album overall from Scottish singer-songwriter Donovan. Brother Sun, Sister Moon was released exclusively on the iTunes Music Store in 2004.

== History ==
In the early 1970s, Donovan agreed to write and record songs for the English version of Franco Zeffirelli's Brother Sun, Sister Moon (1972). The accompanying soundtrack album included none of Donovan's original recordings, as only the Italian version was released, with vocals by Claudio Baglioni and score by Riz Ortolani. The non-availability of the Donovan recordings prompted many of Donovan's fans to request an official release of the songs.

To satisfy demand, Donovan embarked on acquiring the rights to the original recordings. Due to the nature of the original contract and complex publishing rights issues, it became evident to Donovan that releasing the original Brother Sun Sister Moon recordings would be extremely difficult. In the absence of this release, Donovan decided to record new versions of the original songs and release it exclusively through the iTunes Music Store.

For the new recordings, Donovan opted not to recreate the lush orchestration and choir vocals of the original recordings. Instead, he plays guitar and sings solo, in a style reminiscent of his Sutras album.

== Track listing ==
All tracks by Donovan Leitch.

1. "The Little Church" – 3:26
2. "The Lovely Day" – 2:20
3. "Lullaby" – 2:31
4. "Brother Sun, Sister Moon" – 2:02
5. "A Soldier's Dream" – 3:03
6. "Shape in the Sky" – 2:35
7. "Gentle Heart" – 3:52
8. "The Year Is Awakening" – 3:15
9. "Island of Circles" – 2:56
10. "The Lovely Day (Instrumental)" – 2:16
