= Ich töte mich... =

"...Ich töte mich jedesmal aufs Neue, doch ich bin unsterblich, und ich erstehe wieder auf; in einer Vision des Untergangs..."

Studio album by Sopor Aeternus and The Ensemble of Shadows
- Released: 1994
- Genre: Darkwave
- Length: 43:40
- Label: Apocalyptic Vision
- Producer: Sopor Aeternus

Sopor Aeternus and The Ensemble of Shadows chronology
Es reiten die Toten so schnell... (1992)	"...Ich töte mich jedesmal aufs Neue, doch ich bin unsterblich, und ich erstehe wieder auf; in einer Vision des Untergangs..." (1994)	Todeswunsch - Sous le soleil de Saturne (1995)

"...Ich töte mich jedesmal aufs Neue, doch ich bin unsterblich, und ich erstehe wieder auf; in einer Vision des Untergangs..." (German for "...I kill myself every time anew, but I am immortal, and I rise again; in a vision of Doom.."; usually referred to as "...Ich töte mich...") is the debut album by darkwave band Sopor Aeternus & the Ensemble of Shadows, and was released in 1994. The original pressing had no title, though the "...Ich töte mich..." line was printed in blackletter on the back cover; later editions identified the printed sentence as the official title. Originally released as a limited edition of 1,000, the album has been re-released at least three times.

== Overview ==
"...Ich töte mich..." consists of baroque-tinged neo-medieval music and is heavily punctuated by drum machines and pipe organs. Much of the instrumentation is synthesized due to a low budget; the album features guitar performed by Gerrit Fischer on its final tracks. Sopor Aeternus would not return to prominent synthesizer use until 2004's La Chambre D'Echo – Where the dead Birds sing. "...Ich töte mich..." features several elements of the musical project's traditional musicality, including the use of brass and woodwinds throughout. "Birth - Fiendish Figuration" would go on to be re-recorded at least three more times on later albums, while "Tanz der Grausamkeit" would be re-recorded as "Saltatio Crudelitas" for Todeswunsch - Sous le soleil de Saturne and the raucous "Do you know my Name?" would receive equal treatment on Flowers in Formaldehyde.

In 1999, "...Ich töte mich..." was re-released with slightly different artwork and seven bonus tracks, including a couple of demos; "Baptisma", "Beautiful Thorn" and the second half of "The Feast of Blood" (from Es reiten die Toten so schnell...) were re-issued on this pressing. All of the bonus songs were later re-recorded for the 2003 album "Es reiten die Toten so schnell" (or: the Vampyre sucking at his own Vein).

The album has since been re-issued twice with different artwork; once in 2004, and again in 2008. The artwork for the 2004 edition stresses that the full recording consists of demos, and the accompanying press release from Apocalyptic Vision suggested to purchase "...Ich töte mich..." after one is already acquainted with Sopor Aeternus' music. This press release was later removed from the website. The subtitles of songs were not printed on re-issues.

== Track listing ==
All tracks are written by Anna-Varney Cantodea.

Original pressing
No.	Title	Length
1.	"Travel on Breath (the Breath of the World)"	3:46
2.	"Falling into different Flesh"	5:14
3.	"Birth - Fiendish Figuration"	5:00
4.	"Tanz der Grausamkeit" ("Dance of cruelty")	5:37
5.	"Im Garten des Nichts (a secret Light in the Garden of my Void)" ("In the garden of nothingness")	10:51
6.	"Time stands still... (...but stops for no-one)"	8:42
7.	"Do you know my Name ? (Falling... - reprise)"	4:17

Re-issue bonus tracks
No.	Title	Length
8.	"Penance & Pain"	6:21
9.	"Holy Water Moonlight"	5:49
10.	"Beautiful Thorn"	5:00
11.	"The Feast of Blood"	2:37
12.	"Dark Delight (dedicated to Victor Bertrand. Performed live without audience... - for the Dead.)"	4:46
13.	"Baptisma"	4:45
14.	"Birth - Fiendish Figuration ("The inner Hell" - orig. demo)"	5:28

== Personnel ==
- Gerrit Fischer: Guitar on "Time stands still..." and "Do you know my Name ?"
- Varney: Vocals, all other instruments and programming
