= Brother Sun, Sister Moon =

- Theatrical release poster
- Directed by: Franco Zeffirelli
- Written by: Suso Cecchi d'Amico; Lina Wertmüller; Kenneth Ross; Franco Zeffirelli
- Starring: Graham Faulkner; Judi Bowker
- Cinematography: Ennio Guarnieri
- Edited by: Reginald Mills
- Music by: Donovan; Riz Ortolani
- Distributed by: Paramount Pictures (through Cinema International Corporation)
- Release dates: 3 March 1972 (Italy); 12 April 1973 (UK)
- Running time: 135 minutes (Italy); 122 minutes (international)
- Countries: Italy; United Kingdom
- Language: English
- Box office: $1,200,000 (US/ Canada rentals)

Brother Sun, Sister Moon (Italian: Fratello sole, sorella luna) is a 1972 historical drama film based on the hagiography of Saint Francis of Assisi. It is directed by Franco Zeffirelli from a screenplay he co-wrote with Suso Cecchi d'Amico, Lina Wertmüller and Kenneth Ross. It stars Graham Faulkner as Francis and Judi Bowker as Clare of Assisi, along with Leigh Lawson, Kenneth Cranham, Lee Montague, Valentina Cortese and Alec Guinness. The title of the film is from Francis' "Canticle of the Sun."

A co-production of Italy and the United Kingdom, the film premiered on March 3, 1972. It is also known for its song score by musician Donovan, which were later released as his 22nd studio album in 2004. The film received mixed reviews from critics, but was nominated for an Academy Award for Best Production Design and a BAFTA Award for Best Costume Design.

== Plot ==
Francesco, spoiled son of wealthy textile merchant Pietro Bernardone, returns from fighting in the war between Assisi and Perugia. Illness has forced him to leave the war. Francesco is tormented by visions of his past when he was a boisterous, arrogant youth. During a long recovery, he finds God in poverty, chastity and obedience, experiencing a physical and spiritual renewal.

Francesco recovers. However, to his parents' consternation, he spends most of his time surrounded by nature, flowers, trees, animals and poetry as he becomes reluctant to resume his previous lifestyle. Pietro's obsession with gold now fills Francesco with revulsion, creating an open confrontation between them.

One day Francesco wanders into the basement and feels the heat and humidity of the dye vats, seeing the workers with their families laboring in the heat without rest. Rejecting his father's offer to let him take over the business, he instead pulls the laborers out of the building to enjoy the daylight. Then he throws the textiles stored by his father out of the window to the poor gathered below. Francesco invites his father to join in. Pietro beats Francesco, drags him to the bishop's palace and humiliates his son. Lovingly, Francesco renounces all worldly possessions and his middle-class family including the name "Bernardone", removes his clothing and leaves Assisi, naked and free from his past, to live in the beauties of nature as an ascetic and to enjoy a simple life as a man of God.

Francesco goes to the ruins of the chapel of San Damiano, where he hears God's voice asking him to "restore my church." Believing that God means San Damiano, Francesco begins to beg for rocks to rebuild the church. Much to the dismay of his family, some of Francesco's friends join him. He gradually gains a following from the sons of the wealthy, who begin to minister among the poor.

The bishop refuses to stop Francesco, since he is rebuilding a church and performing the works of mercy Christ demands of His followers. Francesco's friend Bernardo joins him after returning from the Fourth Crusade.

Clare, a young woman also from a wealthy family, serves and cares for lepers living near the town. She joins the brothers. Meanwhile, in Assisi, the nobility and wealthy merchants protest against Francesco and his group, worried about them corrupting the town's youth. They command Francesco's friend Paolo to stop the so-called "minor brothers."

One day the rebuilt church is set on fire, and one of Francesco's followers is killed. Francesco blames himself, but cannot understand what he has done wrong. He decides to walk to Rome and to seek answers from Pope Innocent III.

In Rome, Francesco is stunned by the wealth and power of the papal court. In front of the Pope, Francesco breaks from reciting Paolo's carefully prepared script and calmly protests against pomp and worldliness, reciting some of Jesus' words from the Sermon on the Mount to show that Christ's teachings are totally opposite to Rome's obsession with wealth. The cardinals, bishops and abbots of the papal court feel insulted. Francesco and his friends are expelled. Accepting his admiration for Francesco, Paolo decides to join them. Francesco tries to protect Paolo, saying that he is not one of them, but his friend insists on joining the friars, convincing Francesco of the sincerity of his conversion. They are put out with the others.

Pope Innocent, seemingly waking from a dream, has an Epiphany (feeling) and orders Francesco and his friends to be brought back. The Pope addresses Francesco: "In our obsession with original sin we have forgotten original innocence." The Pope admits that when he was a young curate, he thought with the same idealism as Francis "until he became caught in the entrapments of Church Government". He confesses that with the centuries, the church had acquired a lot of wealth and power and that seeing the extreme poverty of Francis and his companions, Pope Innocent remarks "has brought us (the established church) all to shame". In language from one of the Psalms, Innocent prays that Francesco's order may "flourish like the palm."

Then to everyone's astonishment, Pope Innocent kneels, kisses Francesco's feet and blesses him, his companions and grants them permission to establish their holy order of friars. One of the final lines places the sincerity of the Pope's response in question when a cardinal, observing what the Pope has done, comments to a bishop: "Don't be alarmed, His Holiness knows what he is doing. This is the man who will speak to the poor, and bring them back to us."

The film finishes with Francesco walking alone into the countryside to the sound of the title song "Brother Sun and Sister Moon."

== Cast ==
- Graham Faulkner as Francesco di Bernardone
- Judi Bowker as Clare Offreduccio
- Leigh Lawson as Bernardo di Quintavalle
- Kenneth Cranham as Paolo
- Lee Montague as Pietro di Bernardone
- Valentina Cortese as Pica di Bernardone
- Alec Guinness as Pope Innocent III
- Michael Feast as Silvestro
- Nicholas Willatt as Giocondo
- John Sharp as Bishop Guido
- Adolfo Celi as the Consul of Assisi
  - Robert Rietti as the Consul's voice (uncredited)
- Francesco Guerrieri as Deodato
- Sandro Dori as Pietro di Bernardone's servant
- Aristide Caporale as Derelict
- Alfredo Bianchini as Assisiite priest
- Marne Maitland and Carlo Hinterman as Assisiite officials
- Nerina Montagnani as Old beggaress
- Carlo Pisacane as St. Damian's priest
- Renato Terra Caizzi as Old peasant
- Carleton Hobbs as Pope's secretary
- Massimo Foschi as Young Spanish cardinal
- John Karlsen as Older cardinal

== Production ==
Zeffirelli's signature lush photography in Brother Sun, Sister Moon indicates that it was conceived and executed in the same visual manner as his Academy Award-winning adaptation of Romeo and Juliet (1968).

The film attempts to draw parallels between the work and philosophy of Saint Francis and the ideology that underpinned the worldwide counterculture movement of the 1960s and early 1970s.

=== Casting ===
Frank Grimes originally was offered the lead role of Francesco di Bernardone, but Zeffirelli changed his mind at the last minute and withdrew his offer. Al Pacino screen-tested for the role, but Zeffirelli objected to Pacino's theatrical style. Robin Askwith revealed in his autobiography that he was cast in the film but later was fired.

Lynne Frederick auditioned for the role of Clare of Assisi, and was first runner up. Candace Glendenning also tested for the role but was considered to be "too exotic-looking".

Peter Firth made his film debut as one of Francis' disciples, but his role was all-but-deleted from the final cut, though he's still listed in the credits.

=== Filming ===
To capture different seasons filming took place over nine months. Shooting took place in locations throughout Italy, and at Dear Studios in Rome.

=== Editing ===
The Italian version of the film runs 13 minutes longer than the international theatrical cut, and features additional scenes and alternate sequencing.

=== Props ===
The San Damiano crucifix depicted in the film was created by Lorenzo Mongiardino, a production designer of several Zeffirelli movies. It is not an exact copy but a variant of the original, which hangs in the Basilica di Santa Chiara in Assisi, Italy. The crucifix had been kept in a warehouse since filming was completed. In 2001, the crucifix as well as 259 other props and objects from Zeffirelli's collection were put up for auction. Saint Victor Catholic Church in West Hollywood, California bought the cross for $9,300. After restoration, the cross now hangs in the sanctuary of the church.

== Music ==
The film is noted for its score, which reflected the 'flower power' mood of Zeffirelli's film and the cinematography in particular. The score consists of songs by singer-songwriter Donovan, with incidental music composed by Riz Ortolani and arranged by Ken Thorne. Donovan sang all the songs on the soundtrack itself. For the Italian version, the songs were re-recorded in Italian by Claudio Baglioni.

The original soundtrack album only featured Baglioni's versions and Ortolani and underscore. In 2004, Donovan re-recorded the songs from the long out-of-print soundtrack. Brother Sun, Sister Moon was released exclusively on iTunes Store.

=== Unused score ===
The composer Leonard Bernstein and lyricist Leonard Cohen were originally commissioned to provide a score, but after working on the project for about three months in Italy, they withdrew. However Bernstein used "A Simple Song", originally written for the film, in his Mass. Paul Simon was also approached for music and lyrics, but he too declined. However, a quatrain he wrote while considering the commission was later presented to Leonard Bernstein for use in his Mass.

== Reception ==
Brother Sun, Sister Moon received mixed reviews on its release. Roger Ebert harshly criticized the film, writing that it had "an excess of sweetness and light", and that its dialogue consisted of "empty, pretty phrasing". The New York Times reviewer Vincent Canby similarly wrote that the film "confuses simplicity with simple-mindedness". Canby contrasted it negatively with The Flowers of St. Francis, a 1950 film on the same subject. Both reviewers especially criticized the scene where Francis appears before Pope Innocent III, calling it gaudy and excessive. Ebert wrote, "does the Pope always have 200 divines on hand just to hold an audience for a few barefoot monks?" Stanley Kauffmann of The New Republic wrote If I were Pope, I'd burn it'.

However, Christopher Hudson of The Spectator called Brother Sun, Sister Moon "a beautiful and simple film" and especially praised its cinematography, though he acknowledged "the limitations of the script".

On review aggregator website Rotten Tomatoes, the film holds an approval rating of 42% based on 19 reviews from critics, and an average rating of 4.9/10, while holding a rating of 77% from audiences, with an average rating of 4/5.

=== Awards and nominations ===
The film was nominated for an Oscar for Best Art Direction (Lorenzo Mongiardino, Gianni Quaranta, Carmelo Patrono), but lost to The Sting (Henry Bumstead). It was also nominated for the BAFTA Award for Best Costume Design (Danilo Donati). Franco Zeffirelli won the David di Donatello for Best Director, tying with Sergio Leone (for Duck, You Sucker!). Ennio Guarnieri won the Nastro d'Argento for Best Cinematography.

== See also ==
- List of historical drama films
- Canticle of the Sun
- Francis of Assisi (1961 film)
