= Sopor Aeternus and The Ensemble of Shadows =

Darkwave musical project based in Frankfurt

Sopor Aeternus & the Ensemble of Shadows
- Also known as: Sopor Aeternus, Sopor
- Origin: Frankfurt, Hesse, Germany
- Genres: Neoclassical dark wave, dark folk, neo-medieval, gothic rock
- Years active: 1989–present
- Label: Apocalyptic Vision
- Members: Anna-Varney Cantodea
- Past members: Holger
- Website: soporaeternus.de

Sopor Aeternus & the Ensemble of Shadows (Latin: sopor aeternus "eternal slumber"; also referred to or stylized as Sopor Aeternus or Sopor) is a neoclassical dark wave musical project based in Frankfurt.

== Founding ==
The group was founded in 1989 by a non-binary multidiciplinary artist who uses the pseudonym Anna-Varney Cantodea.

== Discography ==
=== Demo tapes ===
The three demo tapes are often referred to as "Blut der schwarzen Rose" or "The Undead-Trilogy". Only the first has been released.

- Es reiten die Toten so schnell… (1989)
- Rufus (1992)
- Till Time and Times Are Done (1992)

=== Studio albums ===
- Ich töte mich... (1994)
- Todeswunsch (1995)
- The Inexperienced Spiral Traveller (1997)
- Dead Lovers' Sarabande (Face One) (1999)
- Dead Lovers' Sarabande (Face Two) (1999)
- Songs from the Inverted Womb (2000)
- Es reiten die Toten so schnell (2003)
- La Chambre d'Echo (2004)
- Les Fleurs du Mal - Die Blumen des Bösen (2007)
- A Triptychon of Ghosts (Part Two) - Have You Seen This Ghost? (2011)
- Poetica - All Beauty Sleeps (2013)
- Mitternacht (2014)
- The Spiral Sacrifice (2018)
- Death & Flamingos (2019)
- Island of the Dead (2020)
- Alone At Sam's - An Evening With... (2023)

=== EPs, soundtracks and remix albums ("sister albums") ===
- Ehjeh Ascher Ehjeh (1995)
- Voyager - The Jugglers of Jusa (1997)
- Flowers in Formaldehyde (2004)
- Sanatorium Altrosa (Musical Therapy for Spiritual Dysfunction) (2008)
- A Triptychon of Ghosts (Part One) - A Strange Thing to Say (2010)
- A Triptychon of Ghosts (Part Three) - Children of the Corn (2011)
- Angel of the Golden Fountain (2015)
- The Story Of 'Es reiten die Toten so Schnell' (2021)
- The Colours (2023)
- The Rules (2023)
- Fab Dead Cult Veil (2024)
- The Dead Have Come (2025)
- Dea Mutárion (2025)

=== Singles ===
- "The Goat" / "The Bells Have Stopped Ringing" (2005)
- "In der Palästra" (2007)
- "Imhotep" (2011)
- Reprise (2018)
- Vor Dem Tode Träumen Wir (2019)
- The Boy Must Die (2019)
- Architecture ll (Instrumental Version)(Remastered) (2021)
- Birth - Fiendish Figuration (The Inner Hell, Side.A) (Memories Are Haunted Places, Side.B) (2021)
- Averno - Inferno (Averno, Side.A) (Inferno, Side.B) (2021)
- The Dead (2021)
- Todesschlaf (2022)

=== Other releases ===
- Jekura - Deep the Eternal Forest (1995) – a compilation featuring four songs by Sopor Aeternus
- Nenia C'alladhan (2002) – a self-titled side project with Constance Fröhling
- Like a Corpse Standing in Desperation (2005) – a boxed set of rarities and hard-to-find albums
- The Goat and Other Re-Animated Bodies (2009) - DVD of previously released videos
- Alone At Sam's (2023) - a single to four player board game
