= Es reiten die Toten so schnell =

Studio album by Sopor Aeternus & the Ensemble of Shadows
- Released: 2003
- Genre: Darkwave, classical
- Length: 65:33
- Label: Apocalyptic Vision
- Producer: Sopor Aeternus, John A. Rivers

Sopor Aeternus & the Ensemble of Shadows chronology
Songs from the Inverted Womb (2000)	Es reiten die Toten so schnell (2003)	La Chambre d'Echo (2004)

Alternative covers
- Limited edition box cover

Alternative cover
- Double vinyl cover

Es reiten die Toten so schnell (or: the Vampyre sucking at his own Vein) (German for "The Dead Ride So Fast") is the seventh album by darkwave act Sopor Aeternus and the Ensemble of Shadows, and was released in 2003. A double vinyl edition and an A5-sized boxed set edition was released, in limited quantities of 666 and 1,999 copies, respectively. The double vinyl edition came with a poster, T-shirt, postcards, communion wafers and "authenticated" graveyard soil.

== Overview ==
For Es reiten die Toten so schnell, Anna-Varney Cantodea went back to their demo tape of the same name and re-recorded all of its songs; the first seven tracks of this album consist of the demo tape in its original sequence. The rest of the album features re-recordings of the bonus tracks that were included on the first Sopor Aeternus album, Ich töte mich..., along with a handful of new songs. "Birth - Fiendish Figuration", Sopor Aeternus' signature song from their first album, appears again in its fourth incarnation on a record. The original version of "Reprise" was a spoken word piece featuring a line from the bridge of "Dead Souls".

John A. Rivers, producer for Swell Maps, Dead Can Dance and Love and Rockets, was brought in to oversee production on 'Es reiten... The album was recorded in England, as opposed to Sopor Aeternus' home country of Germany.

== Track listing ==
All tracks are written by Anna-Varney Cantodea.

No.	Title	Length
1.	"Omen Sinistrum" ("Inauspicious omen")	2:46
2.	"Dead Souls"	7:04
3.	"Stake of my Soul"	3:01
4.	"Beautiful Thorn"	5:14
5.	"Baptisma"	6:37
6.	"The Feast of Blood"	3:35
7.	"Sopor Fratrem Mortis Est" ("Sleep is the brother of Death")	5:33
8.	"The Dreadful Mirror"	5:53
9.	"Reprise"	3:41
10.	"Birth - Fiendish Figuration"	2:52
11.	"Penance & Pain"	4:26
12.	"Holy Water Moonlight"	5:11
13.	"Infant"	0:51
14.	"Über den Fluss" ("Across the river")	2:04
15.	"Dark Delight"	6:43

== Personnel ==
- Chris Wilson: Violin
- Elizabeth Tollington: Cello
- Marcus Cornall: Double bass, electric bass
- Tonia Price: Clarinet
- Eugene de la Fontaine: Oboe
- Eric Santie-Laa: Cor anglais
- Doreena Gor: Bassoon
- James Cunningham: Trumpet
- Julian Turner: Trombone
- Joan Sweet: Tuba
- Paul Brook: Drums
- Anna-Varney Cantodea: Vocals, all other instruments and programming
