= Dead Lovers' Sarabande (Face One) =

Studio album by Sopor Aeternus & the Ensemble of Shadows
- Released: 1999
- Genre: Darkwave, gothic folk
- Length: 64:23
- Label: Apocalyptic Vision
- Producer: Sopor Aeternus

Sopor Aeternus & the Ensemble of Shadows chronology
The Inexperienced Spiral Traveller (1997)	Dead Lovers' Sarabande (Face One) (1999)	Dead Lovers' Sarabande (Face Two) (1999)

Alternative cover
- 2004 re-release cover

Professional ratings
Review scores
Source	Rating
AllMusic	3/5 stars

Dead Lovers' Sarabande (Face One) is the fourth album by darkwave band Sopor Aeternus & the Ensemble of Shadows, and was released in 1999. It is the first concept album by the band, and the first of a two-album suite detailing the mourning of a lover who has recently passed. (Face One) was also the first Sopor Aeternus album to be released in multiple formats, including a double vinyl edition and an A5-sized boxed set edition; both were limited pressings, of 500 and 3,000 copies, respectively. It was also the first to be promoted with an accompanying video.

== Overview ==
Dead Lovers' Sarabande, as a whole, is a transitory death suite detailing the unnamed protagonist's mourning of her lover and her desire to rejoin him in the afterlife. Major recurring themes in the work include loneliness and the dreadful feeling of loss when someone dear dies. The story of the first part centers around Cantodea assisting her husband in committing suicide; although he is said to be suffering, the exact cause is not mentioned. In "Hades "Pluton"", she attempts to make a deal with otherworldly beings in order to recover her husband but refuses it eventually. Anna-Varney Cantodea later admitted that Dead Lovers' Sarabande was dedicated to, but not about, the late Rozz Williams, former frontman of deathrock band Christian Death.

Musically, a shift was made towards folk music and chamber pieces, with more prominent passages for string instruments. For the first time, live brass and woodwinds players were used instead of synthesized instruments; the leap to organic strings occurred on The inexperienced Spiral Traveller. Whereas previous albums contained some wall of sound production techniques, (Face One) was more intimate and featured minimalist arrangements. Songs also became more drone-like, with the use of pedal tones and repeated melodies carried across several instruments; this is most notable on opener "Across the Bridge" and the album's longest piece, "The Sleeper". "Hades "Pluton"" is based on the rhythm of the Roky Erickson song, "Night of the Vampire".

Dead Lovers' Sarabande (Face One) was re-released on CD with newly packaged artwork in 2004.

== Track listing ==
All tracks are written by Anna-Varney Cantodea.

No.	Title	Length
1.	"Across the Bridge"	4:44
2.	"On Satur(n)days we used to sleep"	8:58
3.	"Hades "Pluton""	6:12
4.	"Sieh', mein Geliebter, hier hab' ich Gift" ("Here, my love, I have the poison")	6:22
5.	"Ich wollte hinaus in den Garten" ("I wanted to go out into the garden")	8:32
6.	"Gebet: an die glücklichen Eroberer" ("Prayer: The happy conqueror")	2:49
7.	"Lament/Totenklage" ("Lament/Lament for the dead")	8:18
8.	"The Sleeper (by Edgar Allan Poe)"	11:57
9.	"Die Knochenblume" ("The boneflower")	1:05
10.	"Inschrift/Epitaph" ("Inscription/Epitaph")	3:27
11.	"All good Things are Eleven"	2:49

== Personnel ==
- Katrin Ebert: Violin
- Martin Höfert: Cello
- Johannes Knirsch: Double bass
- Eric Santie-Laa: Cor anglais
- Peter Hergert: Trumpet, trombone
- Eugene de la Fontaine: Tuba, oboe
- Martin Hoffman: Guitars
- Anna-Varney Cantodea: Vocals, all other instruments and programming
