= Todeswunsch =

Studio album by Sopor Aeternus & the Ensemble of Shadows
- Released: 1995
- Genre: Darkwave
- Length: 74:49
- Label: Apocalyptic Vision
- Producer: Sopor Aeternus

Sopor Aeternus & the Ensemble of Shadows chronology
Ich töte mich... (1994)	Todeswunsch (1995)	The Inexperienced Spiral Traveller (1997)

Alternative cover
- 2003 re-release edition

Todeswunsch – Sous le soleil de Saturne (German and French for "Death Wish – Under the Sun of Saturn") is the second album by darkwave band Sopor Aeternus & the Ensemble of Shadows and was released in 1995. Todeswunsch saw a fundamental change in sound, abandoning the heavily synthesized darkwave music for a sound akin to the Renaissance and neo-Medieval music. A limited pressing of 3,000 CDs was initially available, and the album has been re-released at least three times. An accompanying EP, Ehjeh Ascher Ehjeh, was released later that year.

== Overview ==
Todeswunch was a major departure from Sopor Aeternus' first album, ...Ich töte mich..., in that the aggressive synthesized music of the first record was replaced with ornate Renaissance- and Baroque-inspired folk music. brass, woodwinds and acoustic guitars came to the fore, while drum machines were largely abandoned for varying amounts of hand percussion. Shrill female vocals also resound throughout the album, all of them provided by Anna-Varney Cantodea herself.

The album quotes heavily from other works. One example is the title track, where the music is a darkwave version of Cat Stevens' "I Think I See the Light". "Drama der Geschlechtslosigkeit (part 2)" employs the melody from "Chim Chim Cher-ee", as featured in Mary Poppins, while "Shadowsphere" quotes the bass lines from Black Sabbath's "Under the Sun". "The Devil's Instrument" also quotes lyrics from Rozz Williams' "Mysterium Inquitatis". "Todeswunsch" contains the first instance of Cantodea's long-standing interest in Edgar Allan Poe: "Die Bruderschaft des Schmerzes" is a re-telling of his work Dream-Land.

Todeswunsch would see re-releases in 1999, 2003 and 2008. The album artwork received significant changes for both the 2003 and 2008 editions. The painting on the cover of the original release is a detail of Death of the Virgin by Michelangelo Merisi da Caravaggio. The title of "Soror Sui Excidium" was changed to "Soror (Sister of Self-destruction)" for re-releases, and both halves of "Shadowsphere" were indexed into one track on re-issue.

== Track listing ==
All tracks are written by Anna-Varney Cantodea.

No.	Title	Length
1.	"Flesh Crucifix (Suffering from Objectivity)"	1:52
2.	"Die Bruderschaft des Schmerzes (Die Unbegreiflichkeit des Dunklen Pfades, den die Kinder Saturns gehen)" ("The Brotherhood of Pain (The incomprehensibility of the dark path, that the children of Saturn go)")	5:49
3.	"Shadowsphere (The Monologue-World and the subconscious Symbols): part one"	5:02
4.	"Shadowsphere (The Monologue-World and the subconscious Symbols): part two"	2:35
5.	"Saltatio Crudelitatis (Tanz der Grausamkeit, vers.)" ("Dance of cruelty (Dance of cruelty, vers.)")	5:47
6.	"Just a Song without a Name"	0:28
7.	"Soror Sui Excidium (Geliebte Schwester Selbstzerstörung)" ("The destruction of his sister (Beloved sister of self-destruction)")	4:35
8.	"Le Théâtre de la Blessure sacrée" ("The theatre of the sacred wound")	2:58
9.	"The Devil's Instrument"	5:18
10.	"Todeswunsch (vers.)" ("Death wish (vers.)"; Cat Stevens)	5:38
11.	"Drama der Geschlechtslosigkeit (part 1)" ("Drama of asexuality (part 1)")	2:05
12.	"freitod-Phantasien" ("suicide-Fantasies")	3:23
13.	"Drama der Geschlechtslosigkeit (part 2)" ("Drama of asexuality (part 2)")	5:10
14.	"Saturn-Impressionen" ("Saturn-Impressions")	2:47
15.	"Somnabulist's secret Bardo-Life (Does the Increase of Pain invite the Absence of Time?)"	4:17
16.	"Not dead but dying"	5:11
17.	"Only the Dead in the Mist"	5:12
18.	"This profane Finality"	4:35
19.	"Cage within a Cage... (...within a Cage within a Cage...)"	1:59

== Personnel ==
- Gerrit Fischer: Guitar on "Soror Sui Excidium", "Drama der Geschlechtslosigkeit (part 2)" and "Only the Dead in the Mist"
- Varney: Vocals, all other instruments and programming
