= Sutras (album) =

Studio album by Donovan
- Released: 14 October 1996
- Recorded: 1995–96
- Genre: Folk
- Length: 50:51
- Label: American Recordings
- Producer: Rick Rubin

Donovan chronology
One Night in Time (1993)	Sutras (1996)	Rising Again (Live) (2001)

Sutras is the nineteenth studio album (22nd overall) by Scottish singer/songwriter Donovan. It was released in the UK (American Recordings 74321 39743 2) and the US (American Recordings 43705) on 14 October 1996. The US version does not contain the final track, "The Garden".

== History ==
Professional ratings
Review scores
Source	Rating
Allmusic	3/5 stars
Rolling Stone	2/5 stars

By the mid-1990s, the CD reissues of Donovan's 1960s albums and the Troubadour: The Definitive Collection 1964–1976 boxed set reacquainted his fans with his music. These releases also introduced him to newer generations, which helped rebuild his fan base.

The success of Johnny Cash's American Recordings album prompted producer Rick Rubin to search for other artists who would benefit from the same model. While in the studio with Tom Petty, Rubin mentioned that he would like to work with Donovan. Petty suggested that he call Donovan, which he did.

Donovan agreed to have Rubin produce his next album, and prepared over one hundred songs for the recording sessions. The sessions were to feature sparse instrumentation, much like the sessions that made Cash's American Recordings such a success. Rubin insisted that Donovan listen to the folk material that Donovan recorded for Pye Records in 1964 and '65 for inspiration. The recording sessions commenced in 1995 with mixing of the song "El Dorado" in Los Angeles by Sylvia Massy. The deeply meditative Sutras was released late the following year.

Sutras received mixed reviews and failed to achieve the kind of commercial success Cash's American Recordings had. Donovan did not receive a longer contract, and Sutras became his only collaboration with Rubin; it is now out of print in the US. Yet for all its lack of commercial success, Sutras galvanized Donovan's fan base by reestablishing him as a current artist releasing new material. The internet in particular served a vital role in uniting his fans after the release of Sutras. Donovan paid close attention to this movement, and spent the next five years reorganizing his business around the internet to better reach his fans. Sutras can be seen as one of his most coherent solo efforts, since his creative period shortly after learning Transcendental Meditation and the period he spent in India with The Beatles (1967–71).

== Track listing ==
All tracks by Donovan Leitch, except where noted. The US version of Sutras retained the same track sequence, but deleted the last song on the album ("The Garden"), making it a fourteen-track album.

=== Original UK release ===
1. "Please Don't Bend" – 4:14
2. "Give It All Up" – 3:09
3. "Sleep" (Traditional; arranged by Donovan) – 2:47
4. "Everlasting Sea" – 3:33
5. "High Your Love" – 2:31
6. "The Clear-Browed One" – 3:20
7. "The Way" – 2:16
8. "Deep Peace" (Donovan, MacLeod, Walton) – 3:11
9. "Nirvana" – 3:31
10. "Eldorado" (Words by Edgar Allan Poe; music by Donovan) – 3:06
11. "Be Mine" – 3:28
12. "Lady of the Lamp" – 3:53
13. "The Evernow" – 4:09
14. "Universe Am I" – 4:46
15. "The Garden" – 2:51

credits from allmusic.com

=== Credits ===
Artist	Credit
Martyn Atkins	Photography
Nick Brine	Engineer
Christine Cano	Art Direction, Design
Donovan	Composer, Guitar (12 String), Guitar (Acoustic), Harmonica, Harmonium, Primary Artist, Vocals
Steve Ferrone	Drums, Percussion
Josh Haden	Bass
Evan Hartzell	Drums
Mobi Ho	Translation
Nigel Kennedy	Arranger, Violin
Fiona MacLeod	Composer, Voices
Sylvia Massy	Mixing
Caitlin Matthews	Translation
Eddie Miller	Assistant Engineer
Dave Navarro	Chamberlin, Fender Rhodes, Guest Artist, Keyboards, Mellotron, Piano, Sitar (Electric), Vocals (Background)
Edgar Allan Poe	Composer
Jonny Polonsky	Bass
Juliet Prater	Percussion
Paul Reed	Engineer
Paul Roche	Translation
Rick Rubin	Arranger, Producer
Al Sanderson	Assistant Engineer
Dave Sardy	Bells
David Schiffman	Engineer, Mixing
Eddy Schreyer	Mastering
Jim Scott	Engineer
Michael Severens	Cello
Pavinder Singh	Tabla
Michael Stock	Assistant Engineer
Gerri Sutyak	Cello
Benmont Tench	Keyboards
Danny Thompson	Bass (Acoustic)
Traditional	Composer
Jake Walton
