= Avenue of Mysteries =

2015 novel by John Irving

- Author: John Irving
- Language: English
- Genre: Fiction
- Publisher: Simon & Schuster (US)
- Publication date: November 3, 2015
- Publication place: United States / Canada
- Media type: Print (hardcover)
- Pages: 480 pp
- ISBN: 9781451664164
- Preceded by: In One Person

Avenue of Mysteries is a 2015 novel by American author John Irving, his 14th novel. The book was published in November 2015 by Simon & Schuster.

== Synopsis ==
The narrative traces the life of Juan Diego, an aging writer, who travels to the Philippines while struggling with his memories of growing up as a boy in Mexico. As Ron Charles in The Washington Post noted, this novel’s plot: ”evolves from two distinct but mingled storylines. In the present tense, we follow the beloved teacher and novelist Juan Diego Guerrero as he travels from Iowa to the Philippines to fulfill a promise made years ago...But Juan Diego's heart and the heart of this novel lie far in the past. Prone to frequent spells of dreaming... Juan Diego's memories of adolescence around 1970 in Oaxaca, Mexico [forms the other storyline]...”

== Reception ==
Initial reviews just before and after publication of Avenue of Mysteries were, in general, laudatory. In the New York Times Book Review, novelist Tayari Jones was particularly effusive in her admiration, even though she was careful to distinguish Avenue of Mysteries from Irving's masterpieces, among these The Cider House Rules and A Prayer for Owen Meany. If below the standard of these latter novels, nevertheless Jones thought that Avenue of Mysteries held its own:

From the first page to the last, there is a goodness to this novel, a tenacious belief in love and the redemptive power of human connection, unfettered by institutions and conventions. This belief, combined with good old-fashioned storytelling, is surely why Irving is so often described as Dickensian. But John Irving is his own thing, and so is his new novel. "Avenue of Mysteries" is thoroughly modern, accessibly brainy, hilariously eccentric and beautifully human.

Kirkus Reviews offered the novel muted praise: "although not as irresistible as early works such as The World According to Garp and The Hotel New Hampshire, a welcome return to form." Washington Post Book World editor Ron Charles, quoted above, found vintage Irving here, the author casting familiar elements and themes within "new permutations" amidst "a particularly touching and sometimes farcical story of two siblings and their makeshift family." This same reviewer also noted that although Irving does not shirk from depicting a "dangerous, violent world", the story was cast in a semi-comical glow that was reminiscent of John Steinbeck's Cannery Row.
