= Last Night in Twisted River =

2009 novel by John Irving

- First Canadian edition cover
- Author: John Irving
- Cover artist: Everett Irving
- Language: English
- Genre: Fiction
- Published: De Bezige Bij (NL); Knopf Canada (CA); Random House (US)
- Publication date: September 1, 2009 (NL); October 20, 2009 (CA); October 27, 2009 (US)
- Publication place: Netherlands / Canada / United States
- Media type: Print (hardcover)
- Pages: 576
- ISBN: 0-307-39836-6 (CA); 1-4000-6384-1 (US)
- OCLC: 303040526
- Preceded by: Until I Find You
- Followed by: In One Person

Last Night in Twisted River is a 2009 novel by American writer John Irving, his 12th since 1968. It was first published (in English) in the Netherlands by De Bezige Bij on September 1, 2009, in Canada by Knopf Canada on October 20, 2009, and in the United States by Random House on October 27, 2009. The novel spans five decades and is about a boy and his father who flee the logging community of Twisted River on the Androscoggin River in northern New Hampshire after a tragic accident. While on the run, the boy grows up to become a famous writer, writing eight semi-autobiographical novels. The book was included in Time's 2009 list of "the fall's most anticipated movies, books, TV shows, albums and exhibits".

Last Night in Twisted River took 20 years to conceive and write, and is a story within a story that shows the development of a novelist and the writing process. It uses many of the themes and plot devices that have already seen treatment in other works by the author. The career of the novelist in the book closely tracks the career of Irving himself, making it Irving's most overtly autobiographical novel.

The book received mixed reviews in the press. The Independent called it Irving's most powerful work to date, while The Dallas Morning News admired Irving's modern version of the traditional flight and revenge theme. The New York Times was not as impressed and felt that with better editing it could have equaled some of Irving's more powerful works. The St. Petersburg Times described the novel as a "loose and baggy tale in search of a center".

== Plot ==
"The young Canadian, who could not have been more than fifteen, had hesitated too long."

— The first sentence of Last Night in Twisted River.

The novel opens in 1954 in the small logging settlement of Twisted River on the Androscoggin River in northern New Hampshire. A log driving accident on the river has just claimed the life of a young logger, Angel, who slipped and fell under the logs. Dominic Baciagalupo is the camp's Italian-American cook who lives above the kitchen with his 12-year-old son, Daniel. Dominic lost his wife, Rosie, 10 years previously when a drunk Dominic, Rosie and a logger and mutual friend, Ketchum, were dancing on the frozen river, and the ice broke and Rosie went under. Later another accident happens that changes the lives of Dominic, Daniel and Ketchum. "Injun Jane", the kitchen's dishwasher and girlfriend of the local law officer, Constable Carl, is having an affair with Dominic. One night, mistaking her for a bear attacking his father, Daniel kills her with an eight-inch cast-iron skillet. Dominic takes Jane's body and deposits it on the kitchen floor of Carl's house, knowing that Carl will be passed out drunk and will probably believe he killed her, as he often beat her up. Early the next morning Dominic and Daniel tell Ketchum what happened and flee Twisted River in case the bad-tempered Carl finds out what really happened.

Dominic and Daniel head for a restaurant in the Italian North End of Boston to tell Angel's mother of her son's death. Dominic gets a job as a cook in the restaurant and changes his surname to Del Popolo (Angel's mother's surname) to hide from Carl. During this time Daniel attends Exeter, a private school in southern New Hampshire, followed by the University of New Hampshire. While at university Daniel starts writing his first novel. He also meets Katie Callahan, a radical art student, whom he agrees to marry. Katie has one mission in life: to make potential Vietnam War draftees fathers, thus enabling them to apply for paternity deferment. (Note: In 1967 paternity deferment in the United States was a valid reason to escape the draft. In March 1963 President Kennedy expanded the existing 3-A classification ("hardship to dependents") to include paternity deferment for fathers with a "bona fide family relationship in their home between the father and child". Men who qualified for this deferment became known as "Kennedy fathers". In April 1970 President Nixon put an end to the 3-A paternity deferment for new fathers.) Daniel and Katie have a son whom they name Joe, but when Joe is 2, Katie leaves Daniel to find another young man to rescue from the war. Daniel moves to Iowa with Joe, where he enrolls in the Iowa Writers' Workshop. He also changes his name to Danny Angel to hide from Carl, and uses this nom de plume to publish his novels. After graduating from the Writers' Workshop in 1967, Danny and Joe move to Putney, Vermont.

Danny Angel's novels
1. Family Life in Coos County (c. 1967)
2. The Mickey (1972)
3. Kissing Kin (1975)
4. Kennedy Fathers (1978)
5. The Spinster; or, The Maiden Aunt (1981)
6. East of Bangor (1984)
7. Baby in the Road (1995)
8. In the After-Hours Restaurant (2002)

Ketchum keeps in touch with both Dominic and Danny via telephone and letters, and warns them that Carl is looking for them. On Ketchum's advice, Dominic leaves Boston to join Danny in Vermont. He changes his name to Tony Angel, father of the writer Danny Angel. While Danny teaches writing at Windham College, Tony opens and runs his own restaurant. After the publication of his fourth and most successful novel, Kennedy Fathers (based on Katie), Danny stops teaching and focuses on writing. Then in 1983, two of the sawmill's wives in Twisted River are passing through Vermont and stop for a meal at Tony's restaurant. They recognize Tony and later tell Carl where "Cookie" is. Again, on Ketchum's advice, the father and son are forced to flee, this time to Toronto, Ontario.

With their cover blown, Tony and Danny revert to their original names. Dominic finds another restaurant to work in, while Danny continues writing, still under his pseudonym. Joe remains in the United States while at the University of Colorado in Boulder. Danny meets a Canadian screenwriter named Charlotte Turner, who is writing the screenplay of Danny's abortion novel East of Bangor. They decide to marry, but only after Joe graduates. When Joe dies in a car accident in 1987, Danny decides he cannot face the possibility of ever losing another child, and he and Charlotte part ways. He retains the right to a lonely cabin on an island in Georgian Bay at Pointe au Baril, owned by Charlotte, which he uses for his writing.

In 2001, Ketchum gets careless and unwittingly leads Carl to Dominic and Danny's house in Toronto. Carl shoots and kills Dominic and Danny retaliates by shooting and killing Carl. Ketchum is devastated at having failed to protect his friends and takes his own life at Twisted River. Danny, who has now lost his mother, father, son and their friend, tries to focus on writing his next book, a follow-up to his previous eight semi-autobiographical novels. Then his last hope, Amy ("Lady Sky"), arrives on his doorstep. When Joe was 2, Amy had parachuted naked onto a pig farm Danny and Joe were visiting. Danny rescued Amy from the pig pen and Joe, awe-struck by this event, called her "Lady Sky". Amy in turn offered to help Danny whenever he needed it. Having read all about the famous writer and his misfortunes, Amy tracks Danny down and moves in with him. Happy now, Danny finds the opening sentence of his new book: "The young Canadian, who could not have been more than fifteen, had hesitated too long."

== Main characters ==
"It was a world of accidents."

— Dominic Baciagalupo
- Dominic Baciagalupo ("Cookie") / Dominic Del Popolo / Tony Angel – An Italian-American logging company cook in Twisted River in northern New Hampshire. His father, who had absconded before he was born, had the name "Capodilupo" ("Head of the Wolf"), but his mother named him "Baciacalupo" ("Kiss of the Wolf"), which later became "Baciagalupo" due to a clerical error. He damaged his ankle in a logging accident at the age of 12, giving him a permanent limp, after which his mother taught him how to cook to keep him away from the logs. He changes his name to "Del Popolo" in Boston, and to "Tony Angel" (father of the famous writer) in Vermont, to escape the attentions of Constable Carl from whom he and his son are fleeing. He is overprotective of his son, Daniel, and later his grandson, Joe.
- Daniel Baciagalupo / Danny Angel – Dominic's son and kitchen assistant in Twisted River. He is a "Kennedy father" and a famous writer of eight semi-autobiographical novels. He writes under the pseudonym of Danny Angel (after Angel, the young logger who died in Twisted River), a name he also assumed in real life to foil Constable Carl. He is attracted to large older women and is overprotective of his father, Dominic, and his son, Joe.
- Ketchum – A logger in Twisted River who lives permanently in the northern New Hampshire logging camps. His first name is never revealed. He was once married, but is estranged from his children, and had no education beyond the age of 12. He is Dominic's best friend, and is overprotective of Dominic and Daniel; he is their self-appointed "advisor" at Twisted River, and when they are abroad, via telephone, letters, and later, fax (he never discovered email).
- Rosina Calogero ("Rosie") – Dominic's mother's cousin's daughter and his "not-really-a-cousin" wife. She was exiled to Berlin, New Hampshire by her family because she was pregnant, and taken in by Dominic's mother. After his mother died, Dominic (aged 17, he lied about his age to be married while still a minor) and Rosie (aged 24) married and moved to Twisted River. She was a teacher college graduate, and taught at the school in nearby Paris, Maine.
- "Injun Jane" – A 300-pound American Indian dishwasher in the Twisted River cookhouse and Daniel's part-time "babysitter". Her real name is not known. She lost her own son years previously and is fond of Daniel. She is Constable Carl's girlfriend and he regularly beats her up when he is drunk.
- Constable Carl ("Cowboy") – The local law officer in Twisted River who spends his time breaking up bar-fights and sending French Canadians looking for work back to Quebec. He is often drunk and foul-mouthed, and he regularly beats up his girlfriends. He acquired the nickname "Cowboy" because of his erratic and unpredictable behavior.
- Katie Callahan – Daniel's wife while at the University of New Hampshire. They met while posing nude as models in life-drawing classes when Daniel was a junior undergraduate and Katie a senior. She is an anti-war activist and a sexual anarchist. She "rescues" young men from the Vietnam War by marrying and fathering a child with them. She sleeps around and is not a dedicated mother.
- Joe Baciagalupo – Daniel and Katie's son, named after Joe Polcari, the maître d' at the Vicino di Napoli restaurant in Boston where Dominic worked as a cook. He retained the Baciagalupo name, despite his father and grandfather changing theirs. He inherited his mother's "wild side" and is known to be careless and take risks.
- Charlotte Turner – Daniel's intended wife in Toronto, Ontario. She is a Canadian screenwriter Danny meets while she is writing the screenplay for his abortion novel, East of Bangor. After they split up, she goes on to win an Oscar for Best Adapted Screenplay of Danny's novel.
- Amy Martin ("Lady Sky") – Daniel's last love in Toronto. She is given the name "Lady Sky" by Daniel's 2-year-old son Joe after she parachuted naked into a pig pen in Iowa. "Martin" is her maiden name, which she reverted to after a failed marriage and the death of her son.
- Pam ("Six-Pack") - Ketchum nick named her Six-Pack based on his estimate of her nightly beer quota before she switched to Bourbon. A resident of Twisted River who had a long term on-again, off-again relationship with Ketchum and was also once Carl’s girlfriend. She wrote Ketchum’s letters to Dom and Danny since he was a closet illiterate for a lot of his life.

== Background ==
Although this was his 12th published novel, Irving said that Last Night in Twisted River was "20 years in the making". The idea for a novel about a cook and his son on the run had been in the back of his mind for as long ago as 1986. Irving, who likes to start his novels with the last sentence, said in an interview with The Independent in October 2009: "For the longest time the last sentence eluded me, but 20 years ago I imagined a novel about a cook and his young son who become fugitives; who have to run from some violent act that will follow them. And it was always in a kind of frontier town — a place where there was one law, and it was one man, who was single-minded and bad." Irving did not start writing the novel until 2005. Speaking to the BBC World Service in October 2009, Irving explained that he found that last sentence on his way to a doctor's appointment. He said an old Bob Dylan CD was playing "Tangled Up in Blue" in his car, and when he heard the lyrics:

I had a job in the great north woods
Working as a cook for a spell
But I never did like it all that much
And one day the ax just fell

the last sentence suddenly came to him. That was in January 2005, and by August 2005 he had worked his way back to the first sentence and was able to start writing the novel.

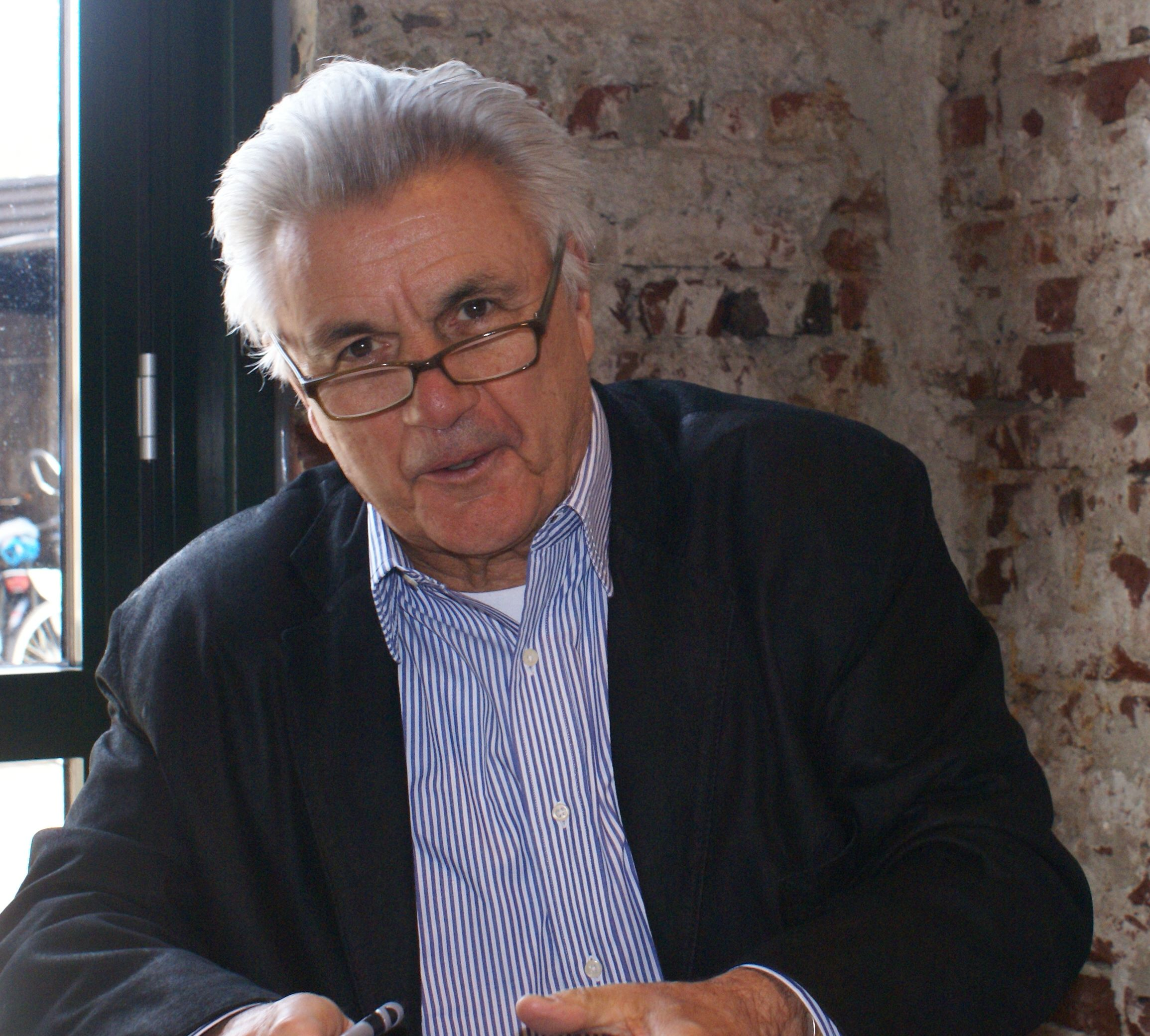
John Irving in March 2010.

The career of the character Daniel Baciagalupo/Danny Angel in the novel bears numerous similarities to that of John Irving. In an October 2009 interview with the New York magazine, Irving stated: "I tried to have fun with the self-referential stuff. I felt the need to be a little playful, because there were autobiographical parts of the last novel that were difficult for me." In his last novel, Until I Find You (2005) Irving had alluded to being sexually abused when he was 11, by a woman in her 20s.

Irving is well known to have been influenced by Victorian authors such as Dickens and Hardy, and American novelists of the same period, including Melville. For Last Night in Twisted River, Irving acknowledges two other sources: The Theban Plays of Sophocles, and the Western movie genre. To make the novel as authentic as possible, Irving used a cousin in the logging business to help locate "an old-time log-driver alive, alert and literate enough in English to read [his] manuscript" (many loggers in New Hampshire were French-speaking Québécois). Irving also researched the restaurant business and its menus and ingredients, calling on the help of friends in the industry. The Toronto restaurant where part of the novel is set, whose address is given as 1158 Yonge Street, was based on the real-life restaurant at that address, Pastis Express.

Last Night in Twisted River was included in Time magazine's 2009 list of "the fall's most anticipated movies, books, TV shows, albums and exhibits".

== Analysis ==
Last Night in Twisted River is John Irving's 12th novel and his "most ambitious", spanning five decades from 1954 to 2005 and taking place mostly in the northeastern United States and southern Ontario in Canada. It is about the relationship between three men: Dominic Baciagalupo, an Italian-American cook with "the look of a man long resigned to his fate", his son Daniel (Danny), who grows up to be a famous novelist, and Ketchum, a "foul-mouthed logger with a heart of gold". The novel is built around its characters and their idiosyncrasies. The father-son relationship between Dominic and Danny is "the heart of the book", and is a departure from Irving's previous novels which generally feature mother-son relationships in the absence of a father.

"I tried to be as faithful to myself as possible, even to the degree that Danny is exactly my age and he went to all the schools I went to. And there are recognisable places in the roadmap of his life as a writer that absolutely coincide with mine. However, what I gave Danny was a life that was not my own."

— John Irving (January 2010)

Last Night in Twisted River is a story within a story that shows, through Danny Angel, the development of a novelist and the writing process. Irving modelled Danny's career loosely on his own: both are the same age; both get a scholarship to Phillips Exeter Academy; both are taught by Kurt Vonnegut at the University of Iowa and go on to become famous novelists; both are "Kennedy fathers" enabling them to claim paternity deferment during the Vietnam war; both have their first success with their fourth novel (Kennedy Fathers and The World According to Garp). Danny and Irving's sixth books, East of Bangor and The Cider House Rules are both abortion novels set in a Maine orphanage which both later win an Oscar for Best Adapted Screenplay. Danny and Irving's fiction are "both autobiographical and not autobiographical at the same time", but Last Night in Twisted River is Irving's most overtly autobiographical novel.

Irving has explored what motivates novelists to write in many of his previous novels, but here, "[a]s he moves into what might be termed his late period", Irving examines these issues far more closely, and bares his soul more than ever before. Rene Rodriguez wrote in the Los Angeles Times that this is Irving's "most personal and revealing exploration of the writing process". In The Times Helen Rumbelow said Irving "almost rivals Paul Auster for the mischievous way he inserts a thinly fictionalized version of himself into the tale".

Many themes present in Irving's earlier works are recycled in this book: the story begins in New England, it features a fractured family, a main character is a writer, sudden tragedy, a young boy is sexually initiated by an older woman and bears. It contains Irving's usual fare of "melancholic humor and comic absurdity", "grotesque deaths and grisly accidents", plus "lots and lots of coincidences". As in Irving's writings, Danny's novels are full of "fairy-tale exaggerations" and "melodramatic worst-case scenarios". Daniel Mallory in the Los Angeles Times said that while Irving "loots his own canon", so do other writers, for example Philip Roth, Richard Ford and Don DeLillo. Lucy Daniel wrote in The Daily Telegraph that while such "predictable eccentricities" might disadvantage a writer, they are "part of the charm" of Irving's works. As in The Hotel New Hampshire, incestuous relationships take place in this book: here Danny has sex with some of his cousins and an aunt. But while Irving presents it in a naughty-but-nice manner, it has serious undertones: it was revealed after Irving's 11th novel, Until I Find You (2005), that he was sexually abused as a child.

English author Giles Foden in The Guardian called Last Night in Twisted River "a very playful novel": it toyed with character and the "fluidity of identity", suggesting that someone may "perform [their] identity rather than be defined by it". Foden said that the whole novel could be seen as a performance of Irving's own literary identity. More of Irving's "playfulness" manifests itself at the end of the book when the first sentence of Danny's new book is the same as the first sentence of Last Night in Twisted River—Danny is writing the very book we have been reading. And the book cover of a wind-bent pine tree (photographed by Irving's son, Everett) is the same tree Danny and Irving see from the window of their writing shacks in Pointe au Baril Station in Ontario.

The narrative moves back and forth in time, with each new section leaping forward 10 to 30 years, and then backtracking, in "fits and starts" to fill in the missing details. Michael Berry said in the San Francisco Chronicle that this "hopscotching strategy allows for multiple layers of suspense and irony". Rodriguez said these "sudden shifts in points of view that give new meaning to the passage you have just read and leaps in chronology that keep crucial incidents offstage" makes it an "agile, sometimes tricky novel", and the closest Irving has come to writing metafiction.

== Reception ==
Last Night in Twisted River received mixed reviews from a number of critics. Simmy Richman wrote in The Independent that it is "the most poetic and powerful of Irving's work to date", and called Irving "the only modern American writer able to seamlessly merge the small detail with the significant event, while writing books that balance literary authority with mass-market appeal". Lucy Daniel in The Daily Telegraph called the book "Moralistic, perverse, funny and uplifting", but added that it was debatable if it was "clever metafiction", or a "thinly disguised memoir". Colette Bancroft in the St. Petersburg Times described the novel as a "loose and baggy tale in search of a center".

Several reviewers of the book were impressed by Irving's characters. English author Giles Foden wrote in The Guardian that Ketchum is "[a] magnificent creation, he's like something out of The Last of the Mohicans", while Ron Charles said in The Washington Post that he is "one of Irving's most endearing and memorable characters", a cross between Shakespeare's Falstaff and Louise Erdrich's Nanapush. Literary critic Michiko Kakutani in The New York Times described Constable Carl, the policeman who pursues Dominic and Danny, as not unlike Victor Hugo’s obsessive Inspector Javert in Les Misérables. Foden said Irving's manipulation of the character's identities was "nothing less than show-stopping".

Bancroft felt that the central character of Danny is not as interesting as those that surround him. He is often a passive observer rather than a participant; many of the important events happen "offstage", only to be recalled later by Danny, resulting in a "leaching of emotion and immediacy". Bancroft complained that "digressions multiply and go nowhere", and that even the restaurant menus, though interesting, are historically dubious". Kakutani was also critical of the novel, saying that with some "diligent editing" it could have equaled some of Irving's more powerful works, in particular The World According to Garp (1978) and A Widow for One Year (1998). She said while it was at times a "deeply felt and often moving story", it was tarnished by a "gimmicky plot; cartoony characters; absurd contrivances; cheesy sentimentality; and a thoroughly preposterous ending". She complained about the same "odd little leitmotifs" that appear in many of Irving's works, and the inflated plot with its "gothic tinsel" and "pointless digressions". She called it an "entertaining" but "messy and long-winded, commentary on the fiction-making process itself".

English novelist and critic Stephanie Merritt wrote in The Observer that once Carl finds Dominic and Danny, the novel "loses momentum and becomes more didactic", and that the "sheer exuberance of detail ... at times threatens to overwhelm the story". But overall she was impressed with the book, saying that it is "a big, old-fashioned novel in the best sense". Joanna Scott wrote in The New York Times that she liked the sensory sensations Irving evoked in the book, in particular those brought on by Dominic's cooking. She also found some of the book's comical scenes, including the naked female skydiver landing in a pigpen, "among the most memorable that Irving has written". Writer and critic Alan Cheuse in The Dallas Morning News enjoyed the book. He found the flight of the father and son a "brilliant plot device", and was fascinated by the details of the restaurant business and the process of writing novels. "As a writer, I had nothing but admiration for Irving's modern version of the old flight and revenge motif."

Michael Berry in the San Francisco Chronicle called it Irving's "most controlled novel since A Widow for One Year". Despite covering five decades and numerous settings, it still "cohere[s] into a satisfying tale of loss and redemption". He said "It's an impressive feat of sustained narrative craftsmanship". Robert Wiersema wrote in the National Post that this is one of Irving's "most rewarding and satisfying novels". He said he performs "the most death-defying of literary feats: negotiat[ing] the delicate line between familiarity and novelty in such impressive style as to create a work that is at once comfortable, vintage Irving yet wholly new and unique". Ron Charles in The Washington Post praised the opening section of the book and its "vibrant" Twisted River community, but was critical of the rest of the novel saying it is "scrambled across many blurry cities and restaurants and different times in a way that deadens the novel's momentum". He said that as soon as Dominic and his son flee Twisted River, the story "disintegrates in what must be the most disappointing wipeout of Irving's career". Charles was particularly critical of the fact that the book dwelt excessively on Danny's writing career, which mirrored Irving's, saying that it was "shorthand for real storytelling, for creating colorful places full of well-developed characters".

William Kowalski in The Globe and Mail questioned why the book was not released as a memoir as there are times when Irving appears to have modeled Danny "literally after himself". He complained that it was these passages that tended to "bog down" the story. Kowalski called the novel "a flawed but mature work by one of our most accomplished writers". For Rene Rodriguez in the Los Angeles Times, the highlight of the book was the attention it gave to the bond between Dominic and his son, but she did feel that the details of the creative process should have been relegated to an essay.

== Work cited ==
- Irving, John (October 2009). Last Night in Twisted River (paperback ed.). London: Bloomsbury Publishing. ISBN 978-1-4088-0214-4.
