= John Yount (writer) =

American novelist

- Born: John Alonzo Yount; 3 July 1935 (age 91); Boone, North Carolina, United States
- Education: Vanderbilt University; Iowa Writers' Workshop
- Occupations: novelist; academic
- Spouses: Susan Childe; Deborah Navas
- Writing career
- Period: 1967–present
- Genre: Novel
- Notable awards: Rockefeller Grant; Guggenheim Fellowship; National Endowment for the Arts Literature Fellowship

John Yount (/ˈjʌnt/) (born Boone, North Carolina, 3 July 1935) is an American novelist and academic. He is known for novels including Hardcastle (1980).

== Life ==
John Alonzo Yount was born in Boone, North Carolina, on 3 July 1935 to John Luther Yount and Vera née Sherwood. He served in the US Army Medical Corps from 1954 to 1956. His father's family was Lutheran while his mother's was Baptist. His paternal grandfather was a Lutheran pastor. Yount was schooled in Pittsburgh, Pennsylvania, and Columbia, Tennessee. After attending Wake Forest University from 1956 to 1957 (where his friends included Miller Williams and James Whitehead, both later poets), he graduated BA at Vanderbilt University in 1960 and MFA at Iowa State University in 1962, where he attended the Iowa Writers' Workshop.

Yount taught English and Creative Writing at Clemson University and the University of Arkansas. He then taught English at the University of New Hampshire, where he is now Professor Emeritus. At New Hampshire, Yount was a mentor to the novelist John Irving. In Trying to Save Piggy Sneed (1993), Irving remembers Yount as "the first writer I was conscious of as a mentor." Yount recalled: "Other than maybe how to use a semicolon, I never taught him anything of value. … Nor has he to this day ever taken any advice from me, which is probably why he's famous."

In 1957, he married Susan Childe. They divorced in 1986. They have two daughters. He later married fellow author Deborah Navas. In 1995, Yount was described as a Democrat and a Lutheran.

== Reception ==
Elmore Leonard named Hardcastle (1980) and Toots in Solitude (1984) "classics of the future." Andre Dubus III calls Yount "a master novelist whom not nearly enough people have had the pleasure of reading." For Charles Simic, Yount is "[o]ne of the finest writers of prose in this country."

Yount was profiled by James Whitehead for Ploughshares in 1974.

== Recognition ==
In 1981, he received a Friends of American Writers award for Hardcastle (1980). He also received grants from the Rockefeller Foundation (1967), the Guggenheim Foundation (1974) and the National Endowment for the Arts (1976).

== Publications ==
=== Novels ===
- Wolf at the Door. 1st ed. Random House, 1967. 2nd ed. Open Road, 2014.
- The Trapper's Last Shot. 1st ed. Random House, 1973. 2nd ed. Open Road, 2014.
- Hardcastle. 1st ed. Richard Marek, 1980. 2nd ed. Southern Methodist University Press, 1992. 3rd ed. Open Road, 2014.
- Toots in Solitude. 1st ed. St. Martin’s/Marek, 1984. 2nd ed. Southern Methodist University Press, 1995. 3rd ed. Open Road, 2014.
- Thief of Dreams. 1st ed. Viking Penguin, 1991. 2nd ed. Southern Methodist University Press, 1994. 3rd ed. Open Road, 2014.

=== Review ===
"Walker Percy's Funhouse Mirror: More True than Distorted," Chicago Tribune (27 February 1977).
