= Until I Find You =

2005 novel by John Irving

- First edition cover
- Author: John Irving
- Language: English
- Genre: Fiction
- Publisher: Random House
- Publication date: July 12, 2005
- Publication place: United States
- Media type: Print (Hardcover and Paperback)
- Pages: 848 pp
- ISBN: 1-4000-6383-3
- OCLC: 58431902
- Dewey Decimal: 813/.54 22
- LC Class: PS3559.R8 U58 2005
- Preceded by: The Fourth Hand
- Followed by: Last Night in Twisted River

Until I Find You (2005) is the 11th published novel by John Irving. The novel was originally written in first person and only changed 10 months before publication. After realizing that so much of the material—childhood sexual abuse and a long-lost father who eventually ends up in a mental institution—was too close to his own experiences, Irving postponed publication of the novel while he rewrote it entirely in third person.

== Premise ==
While the novel uses many of the themes and plot devices that have already seen treatment in other works by the author, it treads new ground in taking on the fallibility of memory, specifically the memories of children (in this case, the memories of the protagonist Jack Burns). The story sprawls across Canada, a large part of Europe and the United States.

The first half of the narration follows a young Canadian actor named Jack Burns through his youth as he travels with his mother in search of his father through the subculture of tattoo artists. Like the title character in The World According to Garp and Irving himself, Jack finds a talent for wrestling and an extended family that aids and hinders him through his trials as a young man coming of age, including his sexual awakening and abuse as an adolescent.

The second half of the narrative sees Jack on the road to discovering the truth behind the misconceptions that his younger self once thought he understood.

== Reception ==
Reception of the novel is poor. Publishers Weekly described the "incessant, graphic sexual abuses [as] gratuitous" but generally describes the novel positively: "Irving handles the novel's less seedy elements superbly." Kirkus describes the novel as "Irving's worst novel". The Independent describes the book as too long, needing editing, and even recommends a book by William Keepers Maxwell Jr. rather than read the novel.

== Allusions ==
In the book, Jack earns the Academy Award for Best Adapted Screenplay in 1999. In reality, this award went to John Irving himself in 1999 for his adaptation of his own book, The Cider House Rules. Additionally, Jack loses the Oscar for Best Supporting Actor to Michael Caine, who also won for The Cider House Rules that year.
