= The Fourth Hand (disambiguation) =

The Fourth Hand is a 2001 novel by John Irving.

The Fourth Hand may also refer to:

- Fourth hand (card player), the player who bids or plays fourth in a card game
- Fourth hand (tool), a bicycle tool for stretching and manipulating brake cables
- The Fourth Hand (Under the Dome), the ninth episode of the first season of the CBS drama Under The Dome
