= Floating Hotel (novel) =

2024 novel by Grace Curtis

Floating Hotel is a 2024 science fiction novel by British author Grace Curtis.

== Plot ==
The novel is set on the Grand Abeona Hotel, an interstellar hotel, focusing on the secrets of the staff and guests aboard the hotel.

== Themes ==
Nadya Mercik of the British Fantasy Society wrote that the characters in the novel "all have something in their past they run away from or try to forget," while adding that the diversity of characters in the book allowed it to explore "the Empire and its flaws, because be [the characters] rich or poor, guests or staff, they have all suffered from the rule in this way or the other."

In an interview, Curtis stated that the name of the novel's narrator was inspired by John Irving's The Cider House Rules and Daphne du Maurier's Rebecca. In another interview, Curtis stated that the novel was initially inspired by the 1970 song "Not The First Time" by The World, while also citing Bernardine Evaristo's novel Girl, Woman, Other and the film Casablanca as inspirations.

== Reception ==
Molly Templeton of Esquire named Floating Hotel as one of the 30 best science fiction novels of 2024, saying that it was "rich with kindness, with bighearted characters from every corner of the ship, but it also has teeth, a working-class sensibility, and a rebellious heart." Nadya Mercik of the British Fantasy Society described the book as "filled with kindness, compassion, extreme selflessness and devotion," while saying that Curtis "excels in creating the atmosphere and populating it with funny, flawed and very likeable characters, which makes for an engaging, immersive story." Publishers Weekly described the book as a "cozy and compulsively readable sci-fi adventure" and that, "centering optimism in the face of an increasingly dark universe, this feel-good saga lingers long after it’s finished."

Steven French of the British Science Fiction Association reviewed the book as "well-written, neatly constructed and, as a result, very easy to read," comparing it to Becky Chambers' Wayfarer Series, while noting that "this is really ‘SF-lite’ as the story could just as easily be situated on an Orient Express-type train, trundling through middle Europe during the early part of the twentieth-century, with assorted odd characters boarding and departing and a crew of lovable misfits led by an unflappable conductor who averts disaster and saves the day."

Kirkus Reviews, on the other hand, warned that "the resolution to the central conflict comes across as rushed, not appropriately cathartic, and doesn’t resolve much other than the immediate situation," saying that while the novel's "journey is great; the destination [is] somewhat disappointing."
