= A Sound Like Someone Trying Not to Make a Sound =

2004 picture book by John Irving

- First edition cover
- Author: John Irving
- Illustrator: Tatjana Hauptmann
- Cover artist: Hauptman
- Language: English
- Genre: Children's picture book
- Publisher: Doubleday Books for Young Readers
- Publication date: September 28, 2004
- Publication place: United States
- ISBN: 0-385-74680-6

A Sound Like Someone Trying Not to Make a Sound, published by Doubleday Books for Young Readers on September 28, 2004, (ISBN 0-385-74680-6), is a children's picture book written by John Irving and illustrated by Tatjana Hauptmann. The title was originally used for a children's book written by a fictional character (Ted Cole) in Irving's 1998 novel A Widow for One Year.

== Plot summary ==
The story takes place in a house, late at night. A young child, asleep in his bed, awakes to hear a sound he describes as "a sound like someone trying not to make a sound". The child wakes his father and describes the sound to him. The child believes that the sound comes from a "monster with no arms and legs", which "slides on its fur" and "pulls itself along on its teeth". The father and child discover that the sound is coming from the mice in the walls, and the child is comforted by his parent. The two return to sleep.

== Reception ==
A Publishers Weekly reviewer wrote that "In showing young readers that the things that go bump in the night are, in reality, not so scary, Irving succeeds in helping them confront their fears." Liz Rosenburg, reviewing for the Boston Globe concluded, "It may not be for everyone, certainly not for the most timid, but it has a satisfying and haunted originality that will win its own fans."
