= The Water-Method Man =

1972 novel by John Irving

- First edition
- Author: John Irving
- Language: English
- Genre: Literary Fiction
- Publisher: Random House
- Publication date: December 1972
- Publication place: United States
- Media type: Print (Hardcover)
- Pages: 365 pp
- ISBN: 0-394-47332-9
- OCLC: 247266
- Dewey Decimal: 813/.5/4
- LC Class: PZ4.I714 Wat PS3559.R8
- Preceded by: Setting Free the Bears
- Followed by: The 158-Pound Marriage

The Water Method Man (1972) is the second published novel by American author John Irving.

== Plot summary ==
The novel revolves around the mishaps of its narrator, Fred Trumper, a floundering late-twenty-something graduate student with serious commitment and honesty issues that earn him the nickname "Bogus." The novel shows Irving beginning to develop a blend of comedy and pathos, as well as a penchant for fashioning quirky characters. It follows a non-linear narrative in the form of a sort of "confession" authored by Trumper, who humorously recounts his various failures in life and love, from his New England childhood through his experiences on foreign study in Vienna, Austria, and as a graduate student in Iowa, leading up to the present-action setting, early-1970s New York, where Trumper is attempting to sever himself from his adolescent past. "I want to change", Trumper says at the end of Chapter One. The phrase seems to be the novel's central theme.

The title refers to a method prescribed to Trumper for the treatment of non-specific urological disorders relating to his abnormally narrow urinary tract. Trumper's urologist, Dr. Jean Claude Vigneron, offers him three options for the treatment of his disorder: abstinence from sex and alcohol, a painful operation to widen the urinary canal, or the Water Method, which consists simply of consuming abnormal quantities of water before and after sex to flush bacteria out of the urinary tract. Trumper opts for the Water Method, suggesting both his generally comical cowardice and lack of self-discipline.

Trumper's narration meanders through flashbacks revolving around his relationships with the novel's two primary female characters: Sue "Biggie" Kunft, a former championship downhill skier whom Trumper courts, impregnates, and marries in Vienna while still a student, and Tulpen, Trumper's present day live-in girlfriend, a documentary film editor in New York, where he lands after losing Biggie. Though the two relationships function chiefly as a means of demonstrating Bogus Trumper's tendency to repeat his mistakes, Irving is often noted for his strong, independent female characters, and Tulpen and Biggie can be seen as markers in the development of the strong women in his more popularly successful novels, particularly The World According to Garp (1979).

Other characters include Trumper's best childhood friend Couth, a still-photographer; Merrill Overturf, an alcoholic and diabetic loon Trumper befriends in Vienna; Ralph Packer, a pretentious documentary filmmaker who employs Trumper as a sound editor; and Colm, Trumper's young son from his first marriage to Biggie.

Trumper is a graduate student at the University of Iowa in comparative literature whose thesis is to be a translation of an ancient, "Old Low Norse" epic called "Akthelt and Gunnel". Irving employs the "Akthelt and Gunnel" poem as a means for allowing Trumper to poke merciless fun at himself through analogously inventing the story of the poem according to his own life's mishaps.

== Reception ==
In a 1972 review, Kirkus acknowledged the book's "tremendous comic drive."

Time greeted the novel with enthusiasm: "Brutal reality and hallucination, comedy and pathos. A rich, unified tapestry."
