= Pointe au Baril, Ontario =

Community in Ontario, Canada

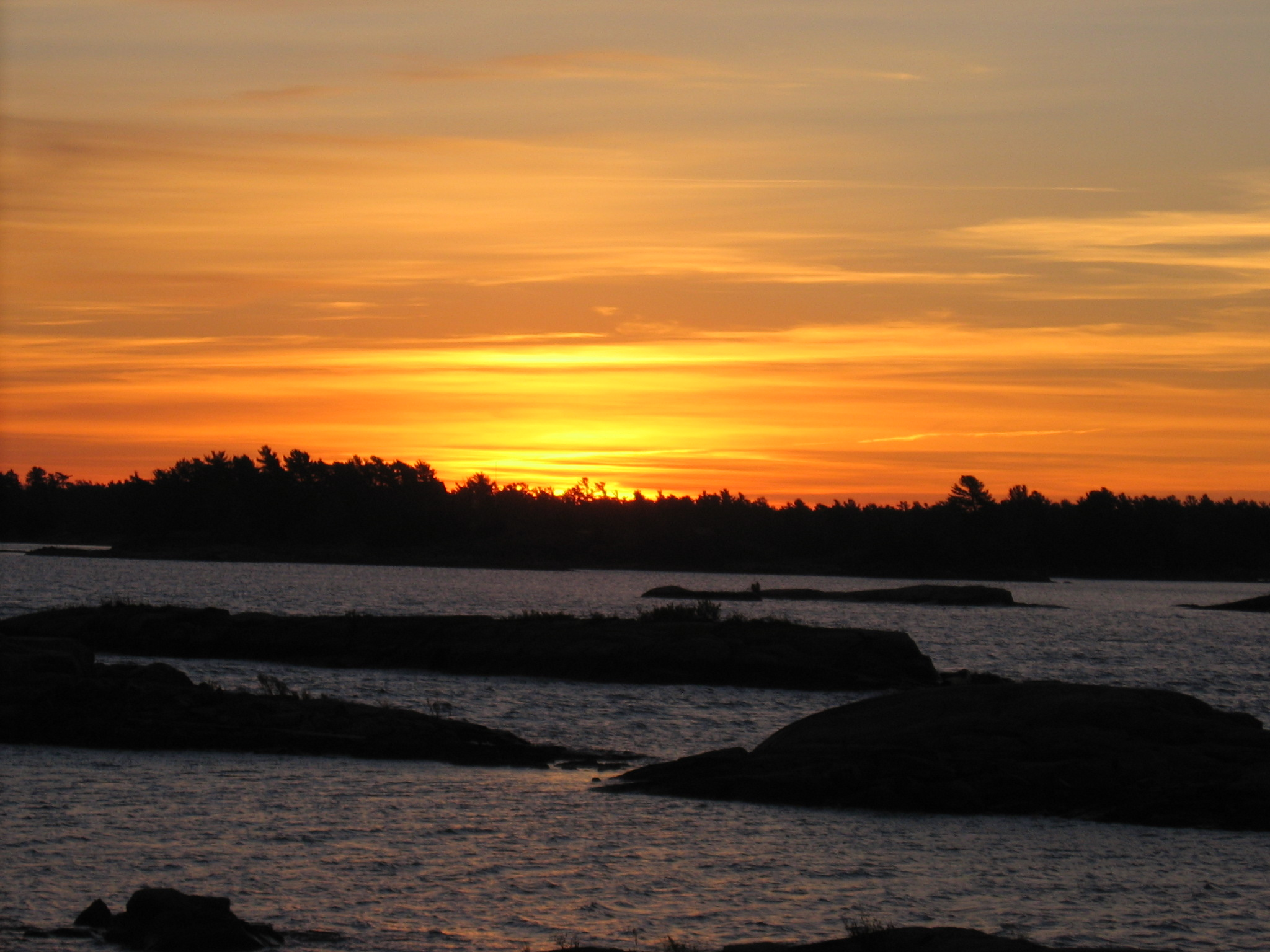
Sunrise at Pointe Au Baril

Pointe au Baril is a community in the Canadian province of Ontario, located on the east coast of Georgian Bay.

The community is located in the township of The Archipelago in the Parry Sound District.

== Historic landmarks ==
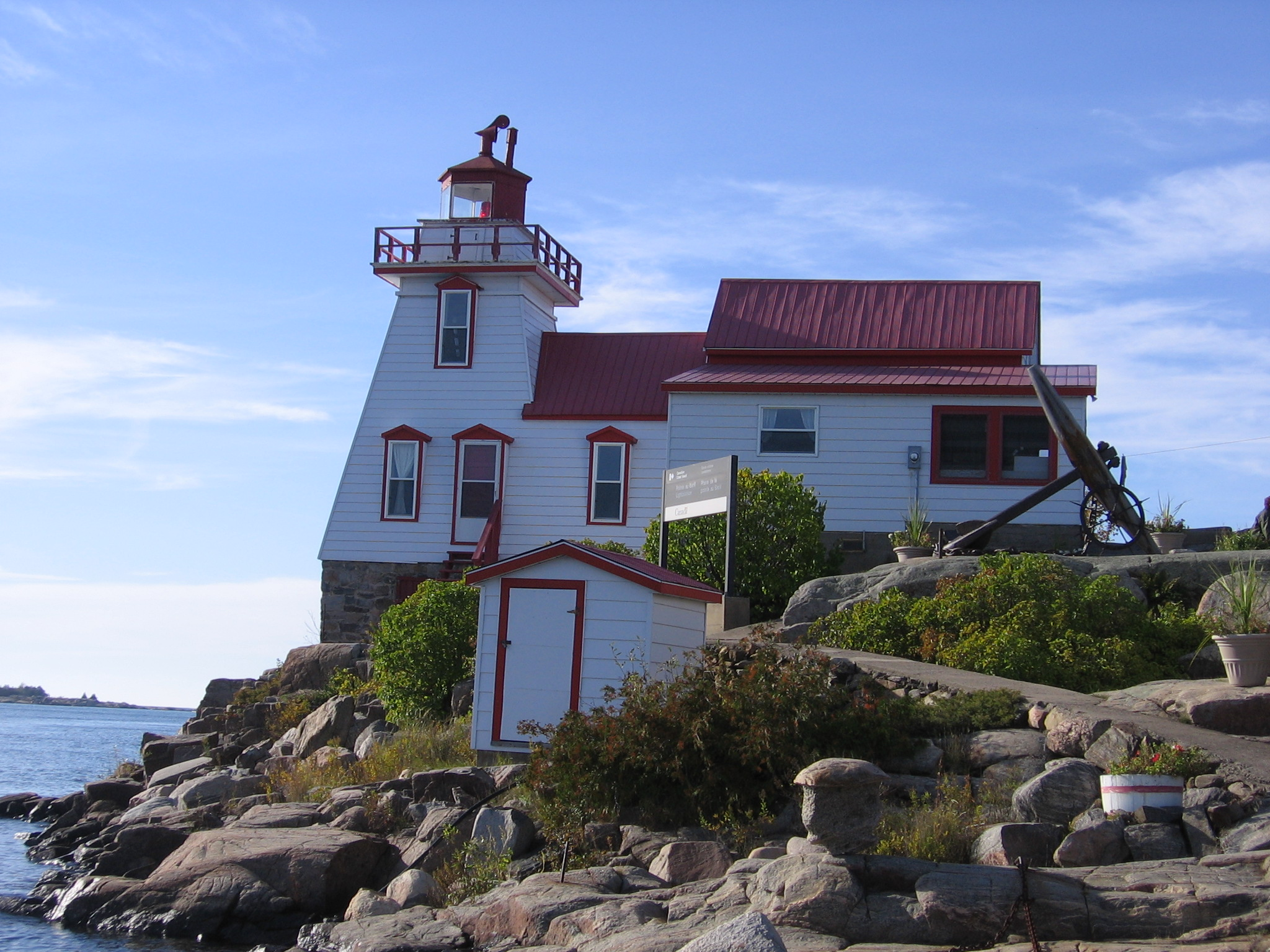
The Pointe Au Baril Lighthouse

=== Lighthouse ===
The point is lit by the recently automated lighthouse. This historic lighthouse opens its doors for tours in the summer months. The lighthouse is a part of a light system which includes a range tower (about one half nautical mile behind the lighthouse) and a turn buoy (nearly three nautical miles offshore from the lighthouse) which work together to allow safe passage through the many shoals that cover the eastern coast of Georgian Bay (45°33′33″N 80°30′13″W). The first Lighthouse keeper was Samuel Edward Oldfield (1843-1917) who was appointed in 1889.

== Early exploration ==
The area was explored by Samuel de Champlain in 1615. A monument was erected in the 1940s to commemorate his travels through the area. It can be found near the newly renovated Ojibway Club, a favoured gathering place for many of the islanders.

== Transportation ==
Intercity motor coach service to the community is provided by Ontario Northland along its Toronto–Barrie–Parry Sound–Sudbury route local schedule; it is bypassed by express schedules, but still receives daily service northbound and southbound.

== Literature ==
Pointe au Baril is also a setting of John Irving's novel Last Night in Twisted River, where many of the places are described in the winter setting, including nearby islands.

Pointe au Baril is also mentioned in the short story "Hired Girl" in Alice Munro's collection, 'The View from Castle Rock."
