= Free the Bears =

Free the Bears may refer to:

- Free the Bears Fund, an Australian charitable wildlife-protection organisation
- Setting Free the Bears, 1968 novel by American author John Irving
