= A Widow for One Year =

1998 novel by John Irving

- First edition
- Author: John Irving
- Language: English
- Publisher: Random House
- Publication date: May 5, 1998
- Publication place: United States
- Media type: Print (Hardcover and Paperback)
- Pages: 537 (hardcover); 668 (paperback)
- ISBN: 0-375-50137-1
- OCLC: 37955786
- Dewey Decimal: 813/.54 21
- LC Class: PS3559.R8 W53 1998
- Preceded by: A Son of the Circus
- Followed by: The Fourth Hand

A Widow for One Year is a 1998 novel by American writer John Irving, the ninth of his novels to be published.

The first third of the novel was adapted into the film The Door in the Floor in 2004.

== Plot ==
The year is 1958 and Ruth Cole is 4 years old. Although she is a loved child, her parents do not have a happy marriage. Her two older brothers died several years earlier in a tragic accident, and she is constantly reminded of their presence by the pictures of the boys' childhood hanging on the walls of the Cole family home. Ruth's father, Ted Cole, is a successful writer and illustrator of books for children. He hires Eddie O'Hare, a teenager who attends Phillips Exeter Academy, the same school Ruth's two late brothers attended, to work as his assistant for the summer. Eddie is unwittingly drawn into a plot orchestrated by Ted to drive his unhappy wife, Marion, to infidelity. Marion, unable to forget her dead sons, shows little affection to her daughter. Ted has always conducted extramarital affairs and would likely lose in a custody battle for Ruth. If Marion had an affair, especially with a teenager, it would strengthen the case for custody to be awarded to him. Ted picks Eddie specifically to tempt Marion because he bears a striking resemblance to his son Thomas, "the confident one". Eddie and Marion's affair leads Marion to leave Ted and Ruth at the end of the summer.

Later it is 1990 and Ruth is 36. She has become a popular, critically acclaimed novelist and is promoting her third and most recent novel, preparing to travel to Europe. She reconnects with Eddie, for the first time since she was 4 years old, when he introduces her at a reading she gives in New York before her European travels. Soon, having come up with the idea for her fourth novel, Ruth is researching in Amsterdam's red light district and finds herself hiding in a closet to witness a prostitute (she has somewhat befriended) with a client. Instead she ends up witnessing the murder of the prostitute. She makes note of certain details of the murder and anonymously sends them to the police, which eventually leads to the murderer being captured. The detective who helps solve the murder becomes preoccupied with finding the "witness" long after Ruth returns to the United States.

Ruth is now 41 and has a son, though her husband has died. This section covers Ruth's own year of widowhood ("A Widow for One Year" is a literal description of Ruth's situation as well as a reference to the first chapter of her third novel, "Not For Children"). The detective who had helped solve the murder case in Amsterdam has finally realized that Ruth is the "witness" due to details she used in her new novel, especially her description of a room identical to the murdered prostitute's. The detective, who had been a dear friend to the prostitute, is also a fan of Ruth's work. Ruth learns that the murder was solved. She meets the detective on her next trip to Europe and they fall in love. The romance is quick and he agrees to follow Ruth to Vermont. They marry. Ruth and Eddie unexpectedly reunite with Marion in the end.

In this book, as in The World According to Garp (1978) and Last Night in Twisted River (2009), John Irving uses writers as protagonists and provides examples of their writing.
