= The Door in the Floor =

2004 film by Kip Williams

- Original poster
- Directed by: Tod Williams
- Screenplay by: Tod Williams
- Based on: A Widow for One Year by John Irving
- Produced by: Anne Carey; Michael Corrente; Ted Hope
- Starring: Jeff Bridges; Kim Basinger; Jon Foster; Bijou Phillips
- Cinematography: Terry Stacey
- Edited by: Affonso Gonçalves
- Music by: Marcelo Zarvos
- Distributed by: Focus Features
- Release date: July 14, 2004
- Running time: 111 minutes
- Country: United States
- Language: English
- Budget: $7.5 million
- Box office: $6.7 million

The Door in the Floor is a 2004 American psychological drama film written and directed by Tod Williams, and starring Jeff Bridges, Kim Basinger, Jon Foster, and Bijou Phillips. It follows a writer (Bridges) and his wife (Basinger) whose familial structure begins disintegrating after he hires an assistant (Foster) who resembles one of the couple's recently-deceased sons. Elle Fanning, Mimi Rogers, and Robert LuPone appear in supporting roles.

The screenplay is based on the first third of the 1998 novel A Widow for One Year by John Irving.

== Plot ==
The story is set in an exclusive beach community on Long Island, where children's book author and artist Ted Cole lives with his wife Marion and their young daughter Ruth, usually supervised by her nanny Alice. Their walls are covered with photographs of the couple's teenage sons, who were killed in an automobile crash, which left Marion deeply depressed and the marriage in shambles. The one shared experience that holds them together is Ruth's ritualistic daily viewing of a home gallery of the deceased sons.

Ted and Marion temporarily separate, each alternately living in the house and in a rented apartment in town. Ted hires Eddie O'Hare to work as his summer assistant and driver, since his own license was suspended for drunk driving.

An aspiring writer, Eddie admires Ted, but he soon finds the older man to be a self-absorbed womanizer with an erratic work schedule, leaving the young assistant to fill his time as best he can. Eddie and Marion soon get involved, which seems not to bother Ted, who enjoys trysts of his own with local resident Evelyn Vaughn (Mimi Rogers) while sketching her. When Ruth catches Eddie and her mother having sex, Ted becomes upset and advises Eddie he may have to testify about the incident if Ted needs to fight for custody.

Marion eventually leaves Ted and their daughter, taking with her all the photographs and negatives of their dead sons, except for the one being reframed after it was broken, injuring Ruth. Eddie takes the initiative to retrieve the picture so that Ruth can have at least one partial image of her brothers.

Ted tells Eddie the story of the car accident that killed his sons. He suggests his and Marion's drunkenness and Ted's failure to remove snow from the tail and turn signal lights likely contributed to their sons' deaths. He gives vivid detail, to help Eddie understand Marion's intense despair. Ted does not fully comprehend why Marion left, repeating, "What kind of mother leaves her daughter?"

At the end of the story, while playing squash alone on his court, Ted stops, looks into the camera with resignation, then lifts the door in the floor and descends.

== Cast ==
- Jeff Bridges as Ted Cole
- Kim Basinger as Marion Cole
- Jon Foster as Eddie O'Hare
- Bijou Phillips as Alice
- Elle Fanning as Ruth Cole
- Mimi Rogers as Evelyn Vaughn
- Robert LuPone as Mendelssohn
- Donna Murphy as Frame Shop Owner
- John Rothman as Minty O'Hare
- Harvey Loomis as Dr. Loomis

== Production ==
In reference to her sex scene with 18-year-old Jon Foster, Kim Basinger said she was concerned because of the actor's age. "I'm so fond of him and protective of him which is just the opposite to most of these situations because usually I've worked with men who are very protective of me. So this was quite the reverse. But Jon was a trouper, just a lovely guy," Basinger said.

Talking about her full frontal nude scene at 48, Mimi Rogers admitted it was "a little scary," but discussions with director Tod Williams about the context and filming of the scene put her at ease. "It's not nudity in a sexual context per se because it's during an art scene and is more relevant to the storytelling as opposed to it being gratuitous, 'OK, now, here's the sex scene.' But it did require me to be there, full-on starkers as they say," Rogers said.

== Release ==
The Door in the Floor was released theatrically in the United States on July 14, 2004, by Focus Features, opening in 47 theaters nationwide.

=== Home media ===
Focus Features released The Door in the Floor on DVD on December 14, 2004. Kino Lorber released a special edition Blu-ray on January 6, 2026.

== Reception ==
=== Box office ===
The Door in the Floor was a box-office disappointment, grossing $6.7 million against a $7.5 million budget. During its opening weekend, it earned $456,876, with an eventual total domestic gross of $3,854,624. The film earned $2,860,443 in international markets.

=== Critical response ===
On review aggregator website Rotten Tomatoes, the film holds an approval rating of 67% based on 144 reviews, and an average rating of 6.46/10. The website's critical consensus reads, "Though uneven in tone, this is one of the better adaptations of John Irving's novels, with Jeff Bridges giving one of his best performances." On Metacritic, the film has a weighted average score of 67 out of 100, based on 38 critics, indicating "generally favorable reviews".

A. O. Scott of The New York Times called the film "surely the best movie yet made from Mr. Irving's fiction" and added, "It may even belong in the rarefied company of movies that are better than the books on which they are based [...] If you examine the story closely, you can find soft spots of implausibility and cliché. But the shakiness of some of the film's central ideas [...] matters far less than it might [...] The Door in the Floor nimbly shifts between melodrama and comedy, with a delightful and perfectly executed excursion into high farce near the end, and it seems perpetually to be discovering new possibilities for its characters [...] Mr. Foster and Ms. Basinger are both very good, but the film is dominated by Mr. Bridges' performance [...] [He] not only dominates the movie, he animates it. He is heroically life-size."

Peter Travers of Rolling Stone rated the film three-and-a-half out of four stars, calling it "extraordinary in every way, from the pitch-perfect performances to the delicate handling of explosive subject matter." He added, "It's bumpy going at times. But Williams is a talent to watch and a wonder with the actors. Basinger's haunted beauty burns in the memory—‌this is her finest work. And Bridges, one of the best actors on the planet, blends the contradictions of Ted [...] into an indelible portrait. You can't shut the door on this spellbinder. It gets into your head."

James Christopher of The Times observed, "What's strange about the film is that it's pitched like a play. There are no obvious ructions yet it bristles with small riddles and puzzling inconsistencies [...] The chemistry is absurd and tragic. Bridges is the obvious pull; Basinger is a one-note trauma. The story is curiously spellbinding, and fabulously ambivalent about their sins."

== Awards and nominations ==
Jeff Bridges was nominated for the Independent Spirit Award for Best Lead Male but lost to Paul Giamatti for Sideways. Tod Williams was nominated for the Independent Spirit Award for Best Screenplay but lost to Alexander Payne and Jim Taylor for Sideways, and was nominated for the Golden Shell at the San Sebastian Film Festival but lost to Bahman Ghobadi for Turtles Can Fly. The film received the National Board of Review Award for Excellence In Filmmaking.
