= The 158-Pound Marriage =

1974 novel by John Irving

- First edition
- Author: John Irving
- Language: English
- Publisher: Random House
- Publication date: August 12, 1974
- Publication place: United States
- Media type: Print (hardback & paperback)
- Pages: 245 pp
- ISBN: 0-394-48414-2
- OCLC: 914828
- Dewey Decimal: 813/.5/4
- LC Class: PZ4.I714 On PS3559.R8
- Preceded by: The Water-Method Man
- Followed by: The World According to Garp

The 158-Pound Marriage is the third novel by American author John Irving. The book explores the sexual revolution-era trend of "swinging" (partner-swapping) via a glimpse into the lives of two couples in a small New England college town who enter casually into such an affair, with disastrous consequences.

== Plot summary ==
The narrator (who never identifies himself by name) is a college professor and a relatively unsuccessful author of historical novels. While doing research in Vienna, Austria, he met Utch, an orphaned survivor of the German occupation and the Russian siege at the end of World War II. At the opening of the novel, the narrator and Utch are married with two children and live a relatively placid existence until, at a faculty party, they become acquainted with Severin Winter, a Viennese-born professor of German and coach of the school's wrestling team, and his wife Edith, a WASP from a privileged background (she met her husband in Vienna while on a buying trip for MOMA) who is an aspiring fiction writer. The narrator begins a mentor-protégé relationship with Edith, and soon the couples are sharing dinners and arranging play dates for their children. As the narrator becomes more attracted to Edith, and Utch begins to fall for Severin, the couples begin trading spouses for sexual encounters at the end of their dinner dates. At first the affairs proceed smoothly, with emotional conflict submerged beneath sexual curiosity, but soon enough, obsessive love rears its ugly head, and the narrator begins to discover that the Winters have not been entirely honest with him and his wife about their motives for entering the affair.

It is ultimately revealed that sometime prior to the events of the novel Severin had an affair with a teacher at the school, and when Edith discovered this she became furious and depressed. In an attempt to provide her with some emotional leverage against him, Severin arranged for Edith to become sexually involved with the narrator, while he himself would sleep with Utch. This foursome soon thereafter fragments; Severin and Edith are able to repair their relationship and forgive each other for the pains they have inflicted on one another. The narrator and Utch, however, are a different story. The narrator had developed genuine feelings for Edith, and while she did seem to reciprocate them, at least to a small degree, he is left despondent after she ends their liaison to salvage her marriage to Severin. For her own part Utch had fallen completely in love with Severin, and she is left devastated upon learning he did not feel the same for her. Utch leaves and takes their children with her, returning to her native Austria to sort out her feelings; she also takes her husband's passport so he cannot follow her. Edith and Severin likewise move to Austria, though it is revealed through letters that Utch writes her husband that she and the Winters do not interact with each other. The novel ends with a small bit of hope for the narrator and Utch when she mails him his passport, indicating she is now ready to mend their relationship.

The sport of wrestling featured prominently—the novel's title refers to the 158-pound weight class, which Severin considers the most elite competitive weight—and a subplot eventually emerges involving Winter's protégé, a peculiar wrestling prodigy from Iowa who transfers to Winter's college because of its superior biology department and becomes a pawn in the fallout of the two couples' swinging relationship.
