= H. Hamilton "Hammy" Bissell =

Henry Hamilton "Hammy" Bissell (1911–2000) was a long-serving member of the faculty of the Phillips Exeter Academy. Born in India to American missionary parents, Bissell was raised in West Newton, Massachusetts. He subsequently graduated from Exeter in 1929 and Harvard in 1933. Serving during the tenures of seven Principals, he occupied a number of positions in the school's administration, particularly Director of Scholarships. In that position, he famously extended the reach of the Academy to fulfil the slogan 'Youth from Every Quarter' by seeing to it that everyone who could qualify academically for Exeter could attend Exeter. He claimed to look for newspaper boys, because "These were the low-income, motivated boys who would thrive at the Academy."

Following his death in 2000, Phillips Exeter Academy renamed its Admissions Office building "Bissell House," and renamed a bridge leading to the athletics fields "Hammy's Way," both in his honor.

Bissell was the uncle of author John Irving. He appears with some disguise in several of Irving's books.
