= A Son of the Circus =

1994 novel by John Irving

- First Edition
- Author: John Irving
- Language: English
- Publisher: Random House (US)
- Publication date: August 1994
- Publication place: United States
- Media type: Print (hardcover and paperback)
- Pages: 633
- ISBN: 0-679-43496-8
- OCLC: 29566583
- Dewey Decimal: 813/.54 20
- LC Class: PS3559.R8 S64 1994
- Preceded by: A Prayer for Owen Meany
- Followed by: A Widow for One Year

A Son of the Circus (1994) is a novel by American writer John Irving. It was a return to his first publisher, Random House, under whose imprint Irving's first three novels appeared.

Though the setting is Mumbai, India and though the book describes the "Great Blue Nile" circus in detail, the novel has many other storylines. A key narrative thread is the growing human understanding in the main character, Farrokh Daruwalla.

The novel includes a crime-story that links the other plotlines: A series of murders take place in Mumbai and nearby places. When this affects an upper-class club and Daruwalla's "dear boy" – an adopted family member – is threatened, the killings are investigated by a sympathetic criminal inspector who long ago married a girl who had witnessed one of the murders.

Another story line concerns twin brothers who do not know each other at first. One is a famous movie actor starring in the Inspector Dhar series, which are scripted by none other than Dr. Daruwalla. The other is a Jesuit who causes all sorts of confusion when he arrives and annoys others. The twins meet when the Jesuit apprentice leaves his religious ambitions behind.

In an interview, Irving noted that he considers the characters of his novels, including A Son of the Circus, to be products not of imagination but of keen observations.
