= In One Person =

2012 novel by John Irving

- Author: John Irving
- Language: English
- Genre: Fiction, Theatre-fiction
- Publisher: Simon & Schuster (US)
- Publication date: May 2012
- Publication place: Canada / United States
- Media type: Print (hardcover)
- Pages: 448 pp
- ISBN: 9781451664126 (US)
- Preceded by: Last Night in Twisted River
- Followed by: Avenue of Mysteries

In One Person is a 2012 novel by American author John Irving, his 13th since 1968. The book was published on May 8, 2012, by Simon & Schuster, and deals with the coming of age of a bisexual man and his coming to grips with his sexual identity.

== Synopsis ==
In One Person is narrated by central character Billy, a bisexual novelist. Billy's story is told through multiple time periods and shows him initially as a teenager with crushes on the "wrong people," but also shows his coming of age.

== Background ==
Irving came up with the idea of writing a book about a bisexual character while thinking "what if," also commenting that the subject matter of bisexuality was familiar to him, having had fleeting crushes on boys while growing up. He also remarked on the subject of the AIDS epidemic of the 1980s when he wrote that he and several family members of homosexual men had only discovered the sexual orientation of these men due to their being diagnosed as having the disease and dying of it. Irving has stated that while it had taken him seven to eight years to conceptualize the book, he felt that the novel's actual writing process was relatively fast and that due to his experiences in New York, did not have to do as much research.

== Themes ==
In One Person deals with several themes such as homosexuality, bisexuality, and AIDS. Other elements mentioned in the book concern transsexuality and the idea of sexual awakening.

== Reception ==
Critical reception for In One Person was mixed to positive. Prevalent criticisms of the book centered on the usage of the character of Billy as a way of discussing various themes and issues, with The Telegraph saying that "Bill Abbott ultimately proves better at discussing Irving’s themes than at embodying them." A reviewer for The A.V. Club criticized that women in the novel were predominantly portrayed as "hateful, bigoted shrews," but praised In One Person as having several strengths such as the novel's conclusion. Praise for the novel also centered on the book's humor and the character of Billy.

The book was a co-winner with Cheryl Burke's My Awesome Place: The Autobiography of Cheryl B in the Bisexual Literature category at the 2013 Lambda Literary Awards.
