= A Prayer for Owen Meany =

1989 novel by John Irving

- First edition
- Author: John Irving
- Cover artist: Honi Werner
- Language: English
- Genre: Bildungsroman
- Publisher: William Morrow
- Publication date: March 1989
- Publication place: United States
- Pages: 617
- ISBN: 0-688-07708-0
- OCLC: 18557147
- Preceded by: The Cider House Rules
- Followed by: A Son of the Circus

A Prayer for Owen Meany is the seventh novel by American writer John Irving. Published in 1989, it tells the story of John Wheelwright and his best friend Owen Meany growing up together in a small New Hampshire town during the 1950s and 1960s. According to John's narration, Owen is a remarkable boy in many ways; he believes himself to be God's instrument and sets out to fulfill the fate he has prophesied for himself.

The novel is also an homage to Günter Grass's most famous novel, The Tin Drum. Grass was a great influence for John Irving, as well as a close friend. The main characters of both novels, Owen Meany and Oskar Matzerath, share the same initials as well as some other characteristics, and their stories show some parallels. Irving has confirmed the similarities. A Prayer for Owen Meany, however, follows an independent and separate plot.

== Plot summary ==
The story is narrated by John Wheelwright, a former citizen of New Hampshire who has become a voluntary expatriate from the United States, having settled in Toronto and taken on Canadian citizenship.

The story is narrated in two interwoven time frames. The first time frame is the perspective of John in the present day (1987). The second time frame is John's memories of the past: growing up in New Hampshire in the 1950s and 1960s alongside his best friend, Owen Meany.

=== Past ===
==== Early childhood ====
John Wheelwright and Owen Meany both live in the fictional town of Gravesend, New Hampshire. The boys are close friends, despite the fact that John comes from an historical and wealthy family — as the illegitimate son of Tabitha Wheelwright — and Owen is the only child of a working-class granite quarryman. John's earliest memories of Owen involve lifting him up in the air, which was easy due to his permanently small stature, in order to make him speak. An underdeveloped larynx caused Owen to speak in a high-pitched voice at all times. During the course of his life, Owen develops the conviction that he is "God's instrument".

==== 1950s ====
As John and Owen move through their schooling, it becomes clear that Owen is advanced in his intellect and self-awareness. He expresses frustration with his parents, over whom he appears to have complete control, and favors John's mother and grandmother, choosing to spend the majority of his time at John's house on Front Street. John's mother, Tabitha, eventually marries a drama teacher from a local private high school, Dan Needham. Dan wins the affection of the boys by giving them a stuffed armadillo to play with; Owen is particularly taken with the creature, and he and John take turns playing hide-and-seek with it. Although John likes Dan, he and Owen speculate about who John's biological father might be — Tabitha refuses to tell him.

Owen is also fond of baseball; despite being a poor player, he curates an enormous collection of baseball cards. At a Little League baseball game, he unexpectedly gets up to bat and hits a foul ball, which strikes Tabitha in the head, killing her instantly. John is distressed, but he and Owen remain friends following a nonverbal exchange facilitated by Dan. It is at this point that Owen reveals that he feels that he is an instrument of God. In order to express this to John, he removes the claws of the stuffed armadillo, just as God has metaphorically taken command of his hands. Later on, he appears as the baby Jesus in a Nativity production at the Episcopal Church he and John attend, and as Ghost of Christmas Yet to Come in a local performance of A Christmas Carol. During the latter role, he becomes convinced that he saw his full name (Paul Owen Meany, Jr.) and the date of his death on Scrooge's grave stone. These events reinforce Owen's ideas about his connection with God.

Because John is held back in school, Owen repeats the ninth grade with him so that the two can attend the Gravesend Academy together. There, Owen Meany earns a reputation as an intelligent, sarcastic student. He is known for his heavily opinionated editorial column in the school newspaper, under the pen name of "The Voice," in which he writes in all-capital letters to reflect his shrill voice; he also earns respect by dating John's college-age cousin Hester. While Owen helps John with his schoolwork, John assists Owen in practicing a basketball maneuver they call "The Shot". This involves John lifting Owen above his head so that he can dunk the basketball. Owen does not reveal why they must practice The Shot; it is not legal in any basketball game. However, they continue to rehearse the move so that they can complete it in under four seconds.

==== 1960s ====
Because of a feud with the headmaster of Gravesend Academy, Owen is expelled in his senior year squandering his chances of going to Harvard or Yale University, both of which had offered him full scholarships. Instead, he chooses to attend the University of New Hampshire while undergoing ROTC training so that he will graduate as a second lieutenant and assume active duty following graduation. This is received poorly by both John and Hester, who oppose the Vietnam War. Despite his insistence that he must join the military himself, Owen helps John avoid the draft by amputating John's index finger with a stone saw.

Following graduation from university, Owen works as a casualty officer, bringing the bodies of Arizona soldiers home from California, recalling his work carving and selling tombstones from his father's quarry. Eventually, Owen tells John and Hester that he has had a recurring dream in which he saves many Vietnamese children, but he sustains wounds that kill him. He believes that this will happen on the date he saw on Scrooge's grave, and he sets out to realize the dream by going to Vietnam. John and Hester are distraught, and attempt to convince Owen that it was only a dream. However, at this point, the novel flashes forward a few years to Owen's funeral, which confirms his premature death. At the funeral, Owen's father reveals to John that he considered Owen to be "like the Christ Child", due to the fact that he and Mrs. Meany never performed intercourse prior to Owen's birth. He also tells John that he told Owen about his apparently miraculous conception when Owen was a young boy. John believes that Mr. Meany is simply delusional and resents the fact that he put this idea into Owen's mind. In the flash forward, it is also revealed that John has discovered the identity of his father — a man whom he has known all his life. He is frustrated that it is Reverend Lewis Merrill, the meek married minister of the Gravesend Congregationalist Church.

The novel returns to a chronological sequence as John relates visiting Owen in Arizona as the predicted date of his death approaches. Owen delivers a body to a poor, dysfunctional family that expresses contempt for the military. At the wake, John accompanies Owen as he confronts Dick, the nihilistic, violent brother of the deceased soldier. Dick expresses a desire to kill Vietnamese people as he shows off the lethal weaponry his brother smuggled in from Vietnam. John and Owen then return to the airport, where Owen almost concludes that his dream was, after all, nothing more than a dream, as he has reached the date of his death and he is not in combat. However, a large group of Vietnamese children arrive at the airport, and Owen recognizes the circumstances of his dream immediately; although he is still not immediately sure about how exactly the final events will play out. Dick, whom John had seen skulking around the airport, attempts to murder the children using a grenade. John catches the weapon, and tosses it to Owen; together they complete The Shot maneuver in order to quickly remove the grenade from the vicinity of the children. The detonation fatally wounds Owen. As he dies, his voice and physique calm the frightened children. He dies satisfied that he has fulfilled the will of God.

John is left with the memory of his friend, and the firm belief that Owen and his life were a miracle. The last words of his narrative are an impassioned plea: "O God—please bring him back! I shall keep asking You."

== Style ==
John Irving uses a unique style when writing A Prayer for Owen Meany. The author and editor Debra Shostak noticed Irving's "repetitive plot", visible throughout several of his novels. Irving gave two possible explanations for this, writing about the "order" this brings to a plot, instead of it being "chaotic and corny". This repetition also serves to place emphasis on certain key events and ideas. Irving described his writing process by saying, "I have the last chapters in my mind before I see the first chapters...I usually begin with endings, a sense of aftermath, of dust settling, of epilogue. I love plot, and how can you plot a novel if you don't know the ending first?" Richard Bernstein has observed that Irving "strives for big novels in the 19th-century manner - eventful, heavily peopled stories of the sort...that you don't see much anymore." Another hallmark of the novel's style is that Irving writes Owen's dialogue in all-capital letters.

== Background ==
Following motifs of faith, religion, war and friendship, John Irving discussed the backstory of A Prayer for Owen Meany before an assembly of drama students at Yale University. Irving revealed the "effects of the morbid Vietnam generation" on the plot of his novel. He tried to communicate, "a victim of the war, but not the victim you see coming from Vietnam." He also mentioned a small boy from his New Hampshire hometown, a boy named Russell, who inspired the character, Owen Meany. This protagonist with a "rock-dust falsetto" became the kid from the granite quarry who later dies in the Vietnam War. Critics also mentioned the similarities in plot between Irving's novels. Shostak recalled repetitive New Hampshire-based stories involving themes such as faith and determination. Irving has also added that his "accumulated churchgoing" has influenced his writing process.

John Irving's mother, Frances Winslow, was not married at the time of his conception. Irving never met his biological father. As a child, he was told nothing about his father, and he told his mother that unless she gave him some information about his biological father, in his writing he would invent the father and the circumstances of how she got pregnant. Winslow would reply, "Go ahead, dear." This theme was also used in The World According to Garp.

== Publication history ==
A Prayer for Owen Meany was published by William Morrow and Company in March 1989. Garp Enterprises owns this copyright. Morrow released an e-book edition on March 13, 2012.

== Reception ==
A Prayer for Owen Meany has been both widely praised and criticized. Alfred Kazin described John Wheelwright as a "conscious and unapologetic wimp" and referred to Owen Meany as a "little squirt". However, J. Denny Weaver commented on Owen's "heroic death", and remarked on the book's continuing theme that life is miraculous. Overall, critics found the novel to be a different but successful addition to Irving's works. The book was on the New York Times Bestseller List.

According to publisher Simon & Schuster, A Prayer for Owen Meany is Irving's "all-time bestselling novel, in every language".

Novelist Frederick Buechner, a former teacher of Irving at the Phillips Exeter Academy whom Irving quoted in an epigraph to A Prayer for Owen Meany, called it simply "a really good book".

== Film, television and theatrical adaptations ==
In 1997, Book-It Repertory Theatre of Seattle, created a narrative-style theatrical adaptation of the novel's fourth chapter, "The Little Lord Jesus". The adaptation is titled "Owen Meany's Christmas Pageant" and has been produced seven times.

The 1998 feature-length film Simon Birch, written and directed by Mark Steven Johnson, was loosely based on the novel. The film starred Ian Michael Smith, Joseph Mazzello, Ashley Judd, Oliver Platt and Jim Carrey. It omitted much of the latter half of the novel and altered the ending. The movie does not share the same title as the book or the character names at Irving's request; he felt that it would "mislead the novel's readers to see a film of that same title which was so different from the book."

In 2002, the Royal National Theatre staged Simon Bent's adaptation of A Prayer for Owen Meany starring Aidan McArdle as the title character and Richard Hope as John Wheelwright.

In 2009, the BBC aired Linda Marshall Griffiths' adaptation of A Prayer for Owen Meany starring Henry Goodman, Toby Jones, Charlotte Emmerson and Max Baldry as a five-part Afternoon Play on BBC Radio Four.

In 2009, Audible.com produced an audio version of A Prayer for Owen Meany, narrated by Joe Barrett, as part of its Modern Vanguard line of audiobooks.

There have also been numerous theatrical adaptations, including Yale University's Dramatic Association's Freshman Show.

== Cultural references ==
California punk rock band Lagwagon's song "Owen Meaney" from their 1998 album Let's Talk About Feelings is based on the book.

The band Jimmy Eat World based the song "Goodbye Sky Harbor" from their 1999 album Clarity on the book.

In the movie Milk Money, the school is named Owen Meany Jr. High School.

Former Los Angeles Lakers coach Phil Jackson has passed out this book to his team in the past as part of his ritual of assigning readings to players.
