= The Hotel New Hampshire (film) =

1984 film by Tony Richardson

- Theatrical release poster
- Directed by: Tony Richardson
- Screenplay by: Tony Richardson
- Based on: The Hotel New Hampshire by John Irving
- Produced by: Neil Hartley; Pieter Kroonenburg; David J. Patterson
- Starring: Jodie Foster; Beau Bridges; Rob Lowe; Nastassja Kinski; Wilford Brimley
- Cinematography: David Watkin
- Edited by: Robert K. Lambert
- Music by: Jacques Offenbach; Conducted by Raymond Leppard
- Production companies: Filmline Productions; The Producers' Circle; Woodfall Film Productions; Yellowbill Productions Limited
- Distributed by: Orion Pictures (North America); Anglo-EMI Distributors (United Kingdom)
- Release date: March 9, 1984
- Running time: 110 minutes
- Countries: United Kingdom; Canada; United States
- Language: English
- Budget: $5.5 million
- Box office: $5.1 million

The Hotel New Hampshire is a 1984 comedy-drama film written and directed by Tony Richardson based on John Irving's 1981 novel. A co-production from the United Kingdom, Canada, and the United States, it stars Jodie Foster, Beau Bridges, Rob Lowe, Nastassja Kinski, also featuring Wilford Brimley, Amanda Plummer, Matthew Modine, and ten-year-old Seth Green in his film debut. The film follows the Berry family that weathers all sorts of disasters and keeps going in spite of it all.

In an introductory foreword that he wrote for a later edition of the novel, author Irving stated that he was thrilled when Richardson informed him that he wanted to adapt the book to the screen. Irving wrote that he was very happy with the adaptation, complaining only that he felt Richardson tried to make the film too faithful to the book, noting the manner in which Richardson would often speed up the action in an attempt to include more material onscreen.

Noted for its assortment of oddball characters, The Hotel New Hampshire was theatrically released by Orion Pictures on March 9, 1984. Although a box office failure grossing $5.1 million against its $5.5 million budget, it has been praised by the critics, particularly for its screenplay, performances, and faithful adaptation.

Richardson wrote in his posthumously published memoirs, "All a creator can feel about the past, I think, is a more or less generalized affection. And purely on that level I’ve never loved any movie more than The Hotel New Hampshire."

== Plot ==
In the 1950s, Win Berry and his wife, Mary, have five children: John, Franny, Frank, Lilly, and Egg. The Berrys decide to open a hotel near the prep school that John, Franny and Frank attend; they call it the Hotel New Hampshire.

John loses his virginity to the hotel waitress. Frank comes out as gay to Franny and John. Franny is raped by big man on campus Chip Dove and his buddies, and is rescued by Junior Jones and other black members of the football team. John confesses to Franny that he is in love with her. The family dog, Sorrow, is euthanized by Win and Frank has him stuffed. Sorrow's reappearance at Christmas causes grandfather Iowa Bob to suffer a fatal heart attack.

A letter arrives from their friend Freud, inviting the Berrys to move to Vienna and run Freud's gasthaus. The family flies to Europe. Tragically, the plane carrying Mrs. Berry and Egg explodes, killing them. In Vienna, the family moves into the gasthaus and renames it Hotel New Hampshire.

An upper floor houses prostitutes and the basement is occupied by various political radicals. Assisting Freud - who has gone blind - is Susie the Bear, who lives her life almost completely in a bear costume. One of the radicals, Ernst, resembles Chip Dove and Franny becomes infatuated with him. Susie and John, who are both in love with Franny, try to keep her away from him. Susie is initially successful in seducing Franny, who soon ends up with Ernst. Lilly, now an adult but still in a 13-year-old body, begins writing a novel called Trying to Grow.

Miss Miscarriage, a radical, grows very fond of the family, and especially of Lilly. She invites John to her room, sleeping with him, then warns him to get the family out of Vienna. For her trouble, another of the radicals murders her. Back at the hotel, John and the rest of the family are caught up in the radicals' plan to blow up the Vienna State Opera with a car bomb. The blind Freud, to spare the family, volunteers to drive with one of the radicals. As he leaves, the Berrys attack the remaining radicals and Freud detonates the bomb right outside the hotel. Ernst is killed and Win is blinded in the explosion.

Hailed as heroes by the Austrians, the Berry family decides to return home. Lilly's novel is published and the interest in the Berrys' story leads to a biopic, written by Lilly and starring Franny as herself. The Berrys are in New York City when John and Susie run into Chip Dove on the streets. The group lure him to Franny's hotel suite and take their revenge upon him, until Franny calls it off.

Meanwhile, John's love for Franny has not abated. She finally calls him over to her room, and hoping to get him over it once and for all, has sex with him for almost a day. Franny's Hollywood career is beginning to take off, with Frank acting as her agent and with Junior Jones back in the picture. Lilly's writing career has stalled; depressed and suffering from writer's block, she commits suicide.

Later, John is staying with his father at the latest Hotel New Hampshire, which stands empty. Susie comes to stay with them and she and John become involved. Win heartily approves because, as he puts it, every hotel needs a bear.

== Cast ==
- Jodie Foster as Franny Berry
- Beau Bridges as Father Win Berry
- Rob Lowe as John Berry
- Nastassja Kinski as Susie the Bear
- Lisa Banes as Mother Mary Berry
- Paul McCrane as Frank Berry
- Jennifer Dundas as Lilly Berry (credited as Jennie Dundas)
- Wilford Brimley as Grandpa "Iowa Bob" Berry
- Seth Green as "Egg" Berry
- Matthew Modine as Chip Dove/Ernst
- Wallace Shawn as Freud
- Amanda Plummer as Miss Miscarriage
- Anita Morris as Ronda Ray
- Dorsey Wright as Junior Jones
- Jonelle Allen as Sabrina Jones
- Cali Timmins as Bitty Tuck

== Production ==
John Irving wrote "I’ve never felt as flattered as when Tony told me he wanted to make a movie of The Hotel New Hampshire" as he "loved" Richardson's movies. "He had a range like no one else — violent or austere one minute, wildly comic the next... I had no doubt what Tony Richardson would do with The Hotel New Hampshire — a macabre comedy and a fairy tale, not half as realistic as Garp."

Richardson wrote "I had loved John Irving's work from the first time I read him. He seems to me one of the most original and towering of contemporary writers." Richardson obtained the rights through producer Norman Twain, with some finance raised from a pizza tycoon, Gene Bicknell. The bulk of the budget came from United Artists although raising the final amount was a fraught process.

The male star was originally going to be played by Timothy Hutton. He pulled out and Rob Lowe was cast instead.

Principal photography took place in Montreal and Tadoussac, Quebec; the 1864 Hotel Tadoussac, on the St. Lawrence River, is among the locations.

Jodie Foster refused to appear nude in the rape scene.

Richardson wrote that except for A Taste of Honey "I'd never directed a film with a whole cast who worked so spontaneously together." Lowe said "I can't wait for the movie to open. I think it's wonderful, and it really gives me a showcase to do some things I haven't been able to do."

As a guest on the January 12, 2022, episode of the podcast Fly on the Wall with Dana Carvey and David Spade, Rob Lowe said Matthew Modine accidentally broke his nose with a steel-toed boot on a stunt gone wrong. Lowe claims that Tony Richardson was so mad at Modine, something evident during the whole production, he had his voice dubbed in post-production by someone else.

Lowe wrote in his memoir:

New Hampshire was awash in familial deep-bonding and bed hopping that would make a Feydeau farce seem tame. The major underlying theme of the book is painful and sometimes complicated sexual awakening, and Tony Richardson created an atmosphere of exploratory, innocent permissiveness that resulted in something like a free-love commune. The backstage sexual energy would then be captured in our work on-screen.

=== Music ===
The rock band Queen was asked by producers to compose an entire soundtrack for the film, but the producers later changed their minds in favour of classical music. Freddie Mercury had already composed the song "Keep Passing the Open Windows" and so it ended up on their 1984 album The Works.

=== "Keep passing the open windows" ===
This phrase recurs throughout the film as a catchphrase among the Berry family. It is drawn from a story that the Berry parents tell their children, about a street performer called "The King of Mice". Saying "keep passing the open windows" is the family's way of telling each other to persevere. Lilly kills herself by jumping, having failed to pass that open window.

=== Flag error ===
When the Berry family is honored by the Austrian government, the hall is decorated not with Austrian flags, but instead with the flag of Tahiti, which is similar with its red and white stripes but has quite different and unequal proportions on its stripes.

== Reception ==
=== Box office ===
The Hotel New Hampshire opened on March 9, 1984, earning $1,075,800 in its opening weekend, ranking No. 11 at the United States box office. By the end of its run, the film grossed $5,142,858 in the domestic box office. Based on an estimated $5.5 million budget, this can be considered a box office bomb.

Rob Lowe later said in 1984 "When some studios do get a good movie, a movie that's different, they kill it. Orion – I hate that studio; I won't work for them again for all the money in the world – releases Hotel New Hampshire with a cartoon of a bear: people thought they were going to see Garfield the Cat. Then they change it to a bicycle for five: people thought they were going to see the Von Trapp family."

John Irving wrote, "By speeding up the story to the Offenbach score, Tony heightened both the comedic and the fairy-tale qualities of the book; he enhanced the hectic narrative momentum of the novel. But he paid a price. Many of the minor (and even the major minor) characters were reduced to caricatures — they became cartoon versions of themselves...I liked the movie nonetheless. Tony's interpretation of the novel as sexual cancan is a much more suitable translation of my sense of humor than Steve Tesich's dialogue in The World According to Garp."

Lowe subsequently wrote in his memoir:

It's not a movie for a mass audience. Its quirky, provocative plot, which spins toward the two leads committing incest, would relegate it to low-budget, independent-movie status, at best. As for the finished product, it's a heroically flawed movie, reaching for something great and sometimes coming very, very close. It attempts too much and also accomplishes much. I'm very proud of it. I wish more people had seen it.

=== Critical reception ===
On Rotten Tomatoes the film has an approval rating of 71% based on 14 reviews, with an average rating of 6.26/10.

Richardson wrote in his memoirs:

The film was not a success with the American critics — they tore it apart as if it was something obscene and filthy. Much of the abuse was directed toward John, whose very success — the fact that his writing works popularly — seemed to them to be the ultimate insult... Curiously enough, the notices were the most perceptive and the warmest in England, where I least expect any kind of friendly treatment and where the critics are my old enemies. Perhaps this was because John Irving isn't dancing on their sacred ground.

=== Home media ===
The film was released on Region 1 DVD on July 10, 2001.

It was released on Blu-ray on January 5, 2016.

== Notes ==
- Irving, John (1999). My movie business : a memoir.
- Lowe, Rob (2011). Stories I only tell my friends : an autobiography.
- Richardson, Tony (1993). The Long Distance Runner: A Memoir.
