= The Fourth Hand =

2001 novel by John Irving

- First edition
- Author: John Irving
- Language: English
- Publisher: Random House
- Publication date: July 3, 2001
- Publication place: United States
- Media type: Print (hardcover and paperback)
- Pages: 336 pp
- ISBN: 0-375-50627-6
- OCLC: 45791398
- Dewey Decimal: 813/.54 21
- LC Class: PS3559.R8 F68 2001b
- Preceded by: A Widow for One Year
- Followed by: Until I Find You

The Fourth Hand is a 2001 novel by American novelist John Irving. It is his 10th published novel.

== Plot ==
While reporting a story from India, Patrick Wallingford, a New York television journalist, has his left hand eaten by a lion. Millions of TV viewers witness the accident, and Patrick achieves instant notoriety as "the lion guy".

In Boston, a renowned hand surgeon, Dr. Nicholas M. Zajac, awaits the opportunity to perform the nation's first hand transplant. After watching the video of Patrick, Dr. Zajac contacts the journalist and pledges to find a suitable hand donor for him.

Doris Clausen, a married woman in Wisconsin, wants to give Patrick Wallingford her husband's left hand—that is, after her husband dies. When her husband later dies from a self-inflicted gunshot wound, Doris immediately rushes the hand to Boston. In the waiting room before the procedure, Doris has sex with Patrick, explaining that she had always wanted to have a child but was unable to with her late husband. The hand is then successfully attached by Dr. Zajac, with unorthodox visitation rights for the hand granted to Doris.

Patrick quickly falls in love with Doris, who has his baby, Otto Clausen Junior. Doris, however, will not return Patrick's love, and only allows him to touch her intimately with her late husband's hand, now Patrick's.
