= Setting Free the Bears =

1968 novel by John Irving

- First edition
- Author: John Irving
- Language: English
- Publisher: Random House
- Publication date: 1968
- Publication place: United States
- Media type: Print (hardback & paperback)
- ISBN: 0-345-21812-4 (hardback edition)
- Followed by: The Water-Method Man

Setting Free the Bears is the first novel by American author John Irving, published in 1968 by Random House.

Irving studied at the Institute of European Studies in Vienna in 1963, and Bears was written between 1965 and 1967 based largely on Irving's understanding of the city and its rebellious youth of the 1960s. The original manuscript for the book was submitted as his master's thesis at the University of Iowa's Writer's Workshop in 1967, and was later expanded and revised to its published version.

== Synopsis ==
The book's central plot concerns a plan to liberate all the animals from the Vienna Zoo as happened just after the conclusion of World War II. Irving's two protagonists—Graff, a young Austrian college student, and Siggy, an eccentric motorcycle mechanic-cum-philosopher—meet and embark on an adventure-filled motorcycle tour of Austria before the novel's climax: "the great zoo bust".

Toward the middle of the book, the two protagonists go their separate ways, and a large section of the novel is given over to "The Notebook"—a chronicle of the Siggy character's family from pre-World War II through the occupation of the Soviets to the late 1960s. Siggy is killed in a motorcycle accident, and the grief-stricken Graff then continues with their plan to free the inhabitants of the Vienna Zoo with Siggy's voice echoing in his head. This ends in catastrophic results.
