= Fourth hand (tool) =

A fourth hand is the name of a specialized bicycle tool for manipulating brake and derailleur cables. The fourth hand allows a mechanic to keep the cable in place while they adjust the tension. Generally the fourth hand contains a locking mechanism.

The fourth hand is sometimes called a "cable puller" or "cable stretcher." Modern fourth hands are an improvement on an earlier generation of cable stretchers known as "third hands," hence the name.

== See also ==
- Bicycle mechanic
