= Trying to Save Piggy Sneed =

1996 book by John Irving

- Trying to Save Piggy Sneed Cover
- Author: John Irving
- Language: English
- Genre: short story collection, nonfiction collection
- Publisher: Arcade Publishing
- Publication date: 1996
- Publication place: United States
- Media type: Print (hardback & paperback)
- Pages: 432 pp (hardcover edition)
- ISBN: 1-55970-323-7 (hardback edition) & ISBN 0-345-40474-2 (paperback edition)
- OCLC: 32466612
- Dewey Decimal: 813/.54 20
- LC Class: PS3559.R8 T78 1996

Trying to Save Piggy Sneed is a collection of short works by novelist John Irving. First published by Arcade Publishing in 1996, it features twelve pieces divided into the three sections of memoirs, fiction, and homage.

Irving's author's notes follow each piece, where he discusses his inspiration and creative process for the works.

== Contents ==
The collection includes the following works:

=== Memoirs ===
- "Trying to Save Piggy Sneed"
- "The Imaginary Girlfriend"
- "My Dinner at the Whitehouse"

=== Fiction ===
- "Interior Space"
- "Brennbar's Rant"
- "The Pension Grillparzer"
- "Other People's Dreams"
- "Weary Kingdom"
- "Almost in Iowa"

=== Homage ===
- "The King of the Novel"
- "An Introduction to A Christmas Carol"
- "Gunter Grass: King of the Toy Merchants"
