= The Cider House Rules =

1999 film by Lasse Hallström

- Theatrical release poster
- Directed by: Lasse Hallström
- Screenplay by: John Irving
- Based on: The Cider House Rules by John Irving
- Produced by: Richard N. Gladstein
- Starring: Tobey Maguire; Charlize Theron; Delroy Lindo; Paul Rudd; Michael Caine; Jane Alexander; Kathy Baker; Kieran Culkin; Heavy D; Kate Nelligan; Erykah Badu
- Cinematography: Oliver Stapleton
- Edited by: Lisa Zeno Churgin
- Music by: Rachel Portman
- Production companies: Miramax Films; FilmColony
- Distributed by: Miramax Films
- Release dates: September 7, 1999 (Venice); January 7, 2000 (United States)
- Running time: 125 minutes
- Country: United States
- Language: English
- Budget: $24 million
- Box office: $88.5 million

The Cider House Rules is a 1999 American drama film directed by Lasse Hallström from a screenplay by John Irving, based on Irving's 1985 novel. Its story follows Homer Wells, who lives in a World War II–era Maine orphanage run by a doctor who trains him to be an OB/GYN, and his journey after leaving the orphanage. The film stars Tobey Maguire, Charlize Theron, Delroy Lindo, Paul Rudd, Michael Caine, Jane Alexander, Kathy Baker, Kieran Culkin, Heavy D, Kate Nelligan, and Erykah Badu.

The film was produced by Miramax Films and FilmColony, and it had its world premiere at the 56th Venice International Film Festival. It was given a limited release by Miramax Films in the United States on December 10, 1999, followed by a wide release on January 7, 2000. It grossed $110,098 in its opening weekend and $88.5 million worldwide against a budget of $24 million. It was positively reviewed and has a 71% approval rating on Rotten Tomatoes.

The film won two Academy Awards: Irving won the Academy Award for Best Adapted Screenplay, and Michael Caine won his second Academy Award for Best Supporting Actor. It was nominated for the Academy Award for Best Picture, along with four other nominations at the 72nd Academy Awards. Irving documented his involvement in bringing the novel to the screen in his book My Movie Business. Since 2011, a portion of the movie's instrumental theme song, composed by Rachel Portman, has accompanied the Pure Michigan logo in commercials for Michigan's tourism industry and at the end of many movies and national TV series filmed in that state. The film marked the first collaboration between actors Maguire and Simmons, who both later worked in Sam Raimi's Spider-Man trilogy (2002–07) and Labor Day (2013).

== Plot ==
Homer Wells grows up at St. Cloud's, a Maine orphanage directed by avuncular Dr. Wilbur Larch. Larch is addicted to ether, and he secretly performs abortions. Conditions at the orphanage are spartan, but the children have love and respect from their caretakers, and they are like an extended family. Older children, such as Buster and Homer, look out for the younger children, and in particular care for those who are sickly. This includes Fuzzy Stone, who was born prematurely to an alcoholic mother and suffers from a respiratory disease, thus spending most of his time beneath a plastic tent ventilated with a breathing apparatus. Each night before sleeping, Larch says to the children "Good night, you Princes of Maine! You Kings of New England!" as both an encouragement and a kind of blessing.

Homer, the oldest of the orphans, is very intelligent, helpful, and even-tempered. He was returned to St. Cloud's twice by foster parents. The first family felt Homer was too quiet (due to orphanage babies soon learning that crying is pointless). The second beat him. Due to Homer's nature, Larch trains him in obstetrics and abortions as an apprentice, despite Homer never having attended high school. Homer disapproves of abortions, and although Larch has trained him, Homer refuses to perform them. After several years, Homer is very skillful and confident in performing obstetrical duties. Larch wants Homer to take over after he retires, but Homer feels it is impossible, as he lacks formal medical education and he wants to see the outside world beyond the orphanage.

One day, Larch performs an abortion on Candy Kendall, who is accompanied by her boyfriend, Wally Worthington, an Air Force pilot on leave from service. Wally's mother, Olive, owns the Worthington family apple orchard estate. Wally returns to his World War II service, but Homer is exempt therefrom, diagnosed by Larch with a heart condition. Homer leaves to live as a worker of the estate's Cider bunkhouse.

While Wally is away, Candy starts flirting with Homer, leading to an affair. Homer picks apples with Arthur Rose's team of migrant workers, employed seasonally at the orchard. A list of rules for its occupants is posted in the Cider House, which the illiterate migrant workers cannot read. Homer reads them the list, so the workers can now follow or ignore the rules as they wish. Homer and Candy become much closer during harvest and spend more time together while Wally is fighting in Burma. Meanwhile, at St. Cloud's, Fuzzy Stone succumbs to his illness and dies. Larch and the staff conceal his death from the other orphans, telling them that Fuzzy was adopted.

The following harvest season, Arthur and his team return to the orchard. Homer then discovers that Rose is pregnant by her father, Arthur. When Homer learns this he decides to abort Rose's pregnancy with Arthur's assistance. A few days later, Rose tries to run away. When Arthur tries to say goodbye to her, she stabs him and flees. He then makes the injury worse, and as a last request, asks Homer and another worker to tell the police his death was a suicide.

Wally returns from Burma a paraplegic. Although Candy loves Homer, she decides to take care of Wally. Immediately after this, Homer learns Larch has died from an accidental overdose of ether. Homer decides he is most needed back at the orphanage. When he returns, he is greeted joyously by both the children and staff. He learns that not only did Larch fake Homer's medical record to keep him out of the war, but he also faked college credentials and used reverse psychology to persuade the orphanage board to appoint Homer as the next director. Homer fills the paternal role that Larch previously held for the children of the orphanage, telling them, "Good night, you Princes of Maine! You Kings of New England!"

== Cast ==
- Tobey Maguire as Homer Wells
- Michael Caine as Dr. Wilbur Larch
- Charlize Theron as Candy Kendall
- Paul Rudd as Lt. Wally Worthington
- Delroy Lindo as Arthur Rose
- Erykah Badu as Rose Rose
- Heavy D as Peaches
- K. Todd Freeman as Muddy
- Kieran Culkin as Buster
- Jane Alexander as Nurse Edna
- Kathy Baker as Nurse Angela
- Kate Nelligan as Olive Worthington
- Paz de la Huerta as Mary Agnes
- J. K. Simmons as Ray Kendall
- Evan Parke as Jack
- Jimmy Flynn as Vernon
- Erik Per Sullivan as Fuzzy Stone
- Skye McCole Bartusiak as Hazel
- Spencer Diamond as Curly Day

== Production ==
An adaptation of The Cider House Rules by John Irving was first announced in May 1991 to be produced by Beacon Pictures and directed by Phillip Borsos and star Matthew Broderick. In January 1997, it was announced FimColony had acquired the rights to the novel and was in the process of adapting it. In February 1997, the film was reported moving forward at Miramax Films with director Michael Winterbottom and Ethan Hawke in talks to star. Later that month, it was reported Billy Crudup was in talks to star. By April 1998, Winterbottom had left the project and Miramax Films had signed Lasse Hallström as director. The following month, Leonardo DiCaprio had reportedly been considered to star in the film. By August of that year, Tobey Maguire had been signed on as the film's star.

== Music ==
The Cider House Rules

Soundtrack album by Rachel Portman
- Released: 7 December 1999
- Genre: Film soundtrack
- Length: 40:33
- Label: Sony Classical
- Producer: Rachel Portman

The film soundtrack consists of the original score composed by Rachel Portman. The album was nominated for the Academy Award for Best Original Score (lost to the score of Le violon rouge) and the Grammy Award for "Best Score Soundtrack Album" (lost to the score of American Beauty).

== Reception ==
On Rotten Tomatoes, the film holds a 71% approval rating, based on 112 reviews with an average rating of 6.6/10. The website's critical consensus reads "The Cider House Rules derives affecting drama from wonderful performances, lovely visuals, and an old-fashioned feel." It also has a weighted average rating of 75 out of 100 on Metacritic, based on 32 critics, indicating "generally favorable reviews".

Leonard Maltin awarded the film a rare four-star rating. By contrast, Roger Ebert of the Chicago Sun-Times awarded it just two stars, stating the film "is often absorbing or enchanting in its parts. Michael Caine's performance is one of his best, and Charlize Theron is sweet and direct as the girl...The story touches many themes, lingers with some of them, moves on and arrives at nowhere in particular."

=== Certificate ===
In the United States, the film was given a PG-13 certificate by the Motion Picture Association of America (MPAA), and in the United Kingdom, it was given a 12 certificate by the British Board of Film Classification (BBFC), which meant that anyone aged 12 or over could see it. However, in Ireland, the film was given the strictest possible rating, 18. According to Ireland's Film Censor, Sheamus Smith, this was because of its themes of abortion, incest, and drugs. At the time, Ireland had a constitutional ban on abortion, which would not be lifted until 2018.

=== Awards and nominations ===
Award ceremony	Year	Category	Recipient(s)	Result	Ref(s)
Academy Awards	2000	Best Picture	Richard N. Gladstein	Nominated	
Academy Awards	2000	Best Director	Lasse Hallström	Nominated	
Academy Awards	2000	Best Supporting Actor	Michael Caine	Won	
Academy Awards	2000	Best Adapted Screenplay	John Irving	Won	
Academy Awards	2000	Best Film Editing	Lisa Zeno Churgin	Nominated	
Academy Awards	2000	Best Original Score	Rachel Portman	Nominated	
Academy Awards	2000	Best Production Design	David Gropman (art direction), Beth Rubino (set design)	Nominated	
Bambi Awards	2000	Shooting Star – Female	Charlize Theron	Won	
Black Reel Awards	2000	Outstanding Supporting Actor	Delroy Lindo	Nominated	
Black Reel Awards	2000	Outstanding Supporting Actress	Erykah Badu	Won	
British Academy Film Awards	2000	Best Actor in a Supporting Role	Michael Caine	Nominated	
Chicago Film Critics Association Awards	2000	Best Original Score	Rachel Portman	Nominated	
Critics' Choice Movie Awards	2000	Best Picture	The Cider House Rules	Nominated	
Empire Awards	2001	Best British Actor	Michael Caine	Nominated	
Golden Globe Awards	2000	Best Supporting Actor – Motion Picture	Michael Caine	Nominated	
Golden Globe Awards	2000	Best Screenplay	John Irving	Nominated	
Golden Reel Awards	2000	Outstanding Achievement in Sound Editing – Dialogue and ADR for Feature Film	List of sound editors (Note: Maurice Schell (supervising sound editor); Laura Civiello (supervising dialogue editor); Gina Alfano (supervising adr editor); Dan Korintus, Bitty O'Sullivan-Smith, Magdaline Volaitis (dialogue editors); Harry Peck Bolles, Marissa Littlefield (adr editors).)	Nominated	
Grammy Awards	2001	Best Score Soundtrack for Visual Media	Rachel Portman	Nominated	
National Board of Review Awards	1999	Best Screenplay	John Irving	Won	
Producers Guild of America Awards	2000	Outstanding Producer of Theatrical Motion Pictures	Richard N. Gladstein	Nominated	
San Diego Film Critics Society Awards	1999	Best Adapted Screenplay	John Irving	Runner-up	
Satellite Awards	2000	Best Supporting Actor in a Motion Picture – Drama	Michael Caine	Nominated	
Satellite Awards	2000	Best Supporting Actress in a Motion Picture – Drama	Erykah Badu	Nominated	
Satellite Awards	2000	Best Supporting Actress in a Motion Picture – Drama	Charlize Theron	Nominated	
Satellite Awards	2000	Best Adapted Screenplay	John Irving	Won	
Screen Actors Guild Awards	2000	Outstanding Performance by a Male Actor in a Supporting Role	Michael Caine	Won	
Screen Actors Guild Awards	2000	Outstanding Performance by a Cast in a Motion Picture	List of cast members (Note: Jane Alexander, Erykah Badu, Kathy Baker, Michael Caine, Kieran Culkin, Delroy Lindo, Tobey Maguire, Kate Nelligan, Paul Rudd, and Charlize Theron)	Nominated	
USC Scripter Awards	2000	USC Scripter Award	John Irving	Nominated	
Writers Guild of America Awards	2000	Best Adapted Screenplay	John Irving	Nominated	

== See also ==
- Ventfort Hall Mansion and Gilded Age Museum
