= James Whitehead (poet) =

American poet and novelist

James Tillotson Whitehead
- Born: March 15, 1936; St. Louis, Missouri
- Died: August 16, 2003 (aged 67); Fayetteville, Arkansas
- Education: Vanderbilt University; University of Iowa
- Awards: Guggenheim Fellowship; Robert Frost Fellowship in Poetry
- Scientific career
- Fields: Poetry, Fiction
- Workplaces: University of Arkansas

James Tillotson Whitehead (March 15, 1936 St. Louis, Missouri - August 16, 2003 Fayetteville, Arkansas) was an American poet and novelist. He published four books of poetry and one novel, Joiner.

== Biography ==
James Whitehead was born in St. Louis in 1936. He grew up in Jackson, Mississippi, where his family moved after World War II. Standing six foot 5 inches, and known as "Big Jim" he received a football scholarship at Vanderbilt University. However, a serious injury there dashed any hopes he had of a professional career. Instead, he focused on his studies, earning a bachelor's degree in philosophy, then staying for a master's degree in English. He then went to the University of Iowa where he acquired an M.F.A. in creative writing.

Whitehead then joined his college friend William Harrison in founding the creative writing program at the University of Arkansas in Fayetteville. They were soon joined by poet Miller Williams, and the three men continued to build what would become one the nations most distinguished writing programs. Whitehead taught at Arkansas for 34 years, from 1965 to 1999. In 2003 he died on the 44th anniversary of his marriage with Guendaline Graeber Whitehead, with whom he had seven children. He was 67.

Whitehead's only published novel, Joiner, came in 1971. The story about an intellectual NFL tackle from segregated Mississippi received wide acclaim from the most respected reviewers including the New York Times, the Boston Globe and the Washington Post. In reviewing the book for Times, novelist R. V. Cassill, wrote: "What Whitehead has achieved is to sound the full range of the Deep South's exultation and lament. Once again, we are told that Mississippi is our Ireland, in literature and politics. His tirade makes an awesome, fearful and glorious impact on the mind and ear." Many people, including President Jimmy Carter considered Joiner to be “one of the South’s best novels.”

Whitehead was constantly revising and experimenting, sometimes to a fault. Literary critic James S. Baumlin, on reading Whitehead's cache of unpublished manuscripts, describes Whitehead's “torturous writing process”:

Whitehead was an obsessive reviser, who would give a day’s worrying to a single word or rhythm. Such care served him well when writing poetry, given the genre’s linguistic concentration; when he wrote fiction, however, this same process led to near-paralysis—to hundreds (literally) of drafts, most starting from scratch, each subtly different from the rest, all drawing on the man’s considerable poetic powers.

Whitehead published four books of poetry: "Domains," "Local Men," "Actual Size" and "Near at Hand."

== Works ==
- Domains, Louisiana State University Press, 1966
- Local Men, University of Illinois Press, 1979, ISBN 978-0-252-00763-7
- Actual Size Trilobite Press, 1985 (poetry chapbook)
- Near at Hand, University of Missouri Press, 1993, ISBN 978-0-8262-0878-1
- Joiner, Knopf, 1971, ISBN 978-0-394-43143-7; University of Arkansas Press, 1991, ISBN 978-1-55728-204-0 (novel)
- The panther: posthumous poems, Editor Michael Burns, University of Arkansas Press, 2008, ISBN 978-0-913785-12-6
- For, from, about James T. Whitehead: poems, stories, photographs, and recollections, Editor Michael Burns, Photographer Bruce West, Moon City Press, 2009, ISBN 978-0-913785-15-7

== Awards ==
- 1972 Guggenheim Fellowship in Fiction
- Robert Frost Fellowship in Poetry, from Bread Loaf Writers' Conference
