= The Hotel New Hampshire =

1981 novel by John Irving

- First edition
- Author: John Irving
- Cover artist: Terry Fehr
- Language: English
- Genre: Romantic novel
- Publisher: E. P. Dutton
- Publication date: 1981
- Publication place: United States
- Media type: Print (hardcover and paperback)
- Pages: 401 (first edition, hardback)
- ISBN: 0-525-12800-X (first edition, hardback)
- OCLC: 7306103
- Dewey Decimal: 813/.54 19
- LC Class: PS3559.R8 H6 1981
- Preceded by: The World According to Garp
- Followed by: The Cider House Rules

The Hotel New Hampshire is a 1981 coming of age novel by American-Canadian writer John Irving, his fifth published novel.

== Plot ==
This novel is the story of the Berrys, a quirky New Hampshire family composed of a married couple, Win and Mary, and their five children, Frank, Franny, John, Lilly, and Egg. The parents, both from the small town of Dairy, New Hampshire (presumably based on Derry, New Hampshire), fall in love while working at a summer resort hotel in Maine as teenagers. There, they meet a Viennese Jew named Freud who works at the resort as a handyman and entertainer, performing with his pet bear, State o' Maine; Freud comes to symbolize the magic of that summer for them. By summer's end, the teens are engaged, and Win buys Freud's bear and motorcycle and travels the country performing to raise money to go to Harvard, which he subsequently attends while Mary starts their family. He then returns to Dairy and teaches at the local second-rate boys' prep school he attended, the Dairy School. But he is unsatisfied and dreaming of something better.

Brash, self-confident beauty Franny is the object of John's adoration. John serves as the narrator, and is sweet, if naive. Frank is physically and socially awkward, reserved, and homosexual; he shares a friendship with his younger sister, Lilly, a romantic young girl who has stopped physically growing. Egg is an immature little boy with a penchant for dressing up in costumes. John and Franny are companions, seeing themselves as the most normal of the children, aware their family is rather strange. But, as John remarks, to themselves the family's oddness seems "right as rain."

Win conceives the idea of turning an abandoned girls' school into a hotel. He names it the Hotel New Hampshire and the family moves in. This becomes the first part of the Dickensian-style tale. Key plot points include Franny's rape at the hands of quarterback Chipper Dove and several of his fellow football teammates. The actions and attitude of Chipper, with whom Franny is in love, are contrasted with those of her rescuer, Junior Jones, a black member of the team. The death of the family dog, Sorrow, provides dark comedy as he is repeatedly "resurrected" via taxidermy, first scaring Win's father, Iowa Bob, to death and then foiling a sexual initiation of John's. John partakes in a continuing sexual/business relationship with the older hotel housekeeper, Ronda Ray, which ends when a letter arrives from Freud in Vienna, inviting the family to move to help him (and his new "smart" bear) run his hotel there.

Traveling separately from the rest of the family, Mary and Egg are killed in a plane crash. The others take up life in Vienna at what is renamed the (second) Hotel New Hampshire, one floor of which is occupied by prostitutes and another floor by a group of radical communists. The family discover Freud is now blind and the "smart bear" is actually a young woman named Susie, who has endured events which leave her with little fondness for humans and feeling most secure inside a very realistic bear suit. After the death of his wife, Win Berry retreats further into his own hazy, vague fantasy world, while the family navigate relationships with the prostitutes and the radicals. John and Franny experience the pain and desire of being in love with each other. The two also feel jealousy when John becomes romantically involved with a communist who commits suicide, and Franny finds comfort, freedom, and excitement in sexual relationships with both Susie the Bear and Ernst, the "quarterback" of the radicals. Lilly develops as a writer and authors a novel based on the family, under whose noses an elaborate plot is being hatched by the radicals to blow up the Vienna opera house, using Freud and the family as hostages, which Freud and Win barely manage to stop. In the process, Freud dies and Win himself is blinded. The family become famous as heroes, and with Frank as Lilly's agent, her book is published for a large amount of money. The family (with Susie) returns to the States, taking up residence in The Stanhope hotel in New York.

In the final part of the novel, Franny and John find a way to resolve their love, and Franny, with Susie's ingenious assistance, finally gets revenge on Chipper. Franny also finds success as a movie actress and marries Junior, now a well-known civil rights lawyer. Lilly is unable to cope with the pressure of her career and her own self-criticism and commits suicide. John and Frank purchase the shut-down resort in Maine where their parents met during the "magical" summer, and the property becomes another hotel of sorts, functioning as a rape crisis center run by Susie and with Win providing unwitting counsel to victims. Susie, whose emotional pain and insecurities have healed somewhat with time and effort, builds a happy relationship with John, and a pregnant Franny asks them to raise her and Junior's impending baby.

== Characters ==
John Berry: John is the third child of Win and Mary Berry. He has four siblings: Frank, Franny, Lilly, and Egg. The story is told from a first-person point of view, John being the narrator. He is particularly close to Franny, more so than any of his other siblings, and eventually falls in love with her. After Franny is raped, John takes a particular interest in becoming physically fitter to fulfill his desired role as Franny's protector, attempting to impress Franny and assuage the guilt he felt for not stopping the attack. With help from his grandfather, Iowa Bob (or Coach Bob), he begins working out, until he is able to describe himself such: "That’s me: five feet eight inches tall, and 150 pounds. And hard all over." (111). Although John has a few short sexual endeavors with various women, he always holds a special place in his heart for Franny. Eventually, the two succumb to their mutual love and have sex for almost an entire day. After this, they remain close, but only as brother and sister. John helps start a rape recovery and support clinic at the old Arbuthnot-by-the-Sea, where his parents first met. He also marries Susie the Bear, and the couple adopt Franny's child.

Franny Berry: Second-oldest child of the Berry family, she is considered strikingly attractive. She has a tendency to take charge of the family, particularly after her mother dies. She is caring, vibrant, and outgoing, although her confidence sometimes tends toward offensive or reckless behavior; however, her intentions are always to protect those she loves. She also eventually falls in love with her brother, John. During her teenage years, she becomes the victim of a gang rape, revealing previously hidden sensitivity and self-doubt, and the experience remains with her throughout her life. She becomes an actress and stars in a movie about her own family. After she and John resolve their love for each other, she marries one of the classmates who rescued her from the rape, Junior Jones. Much later, the two have a child, which they give to John and Susie.

Frank Berry: Oldest of the Berry children, he is often at odds with John and Franny. Around the age of 16 he comes out as homosexual, which results in a fair amount of abuse from his schoolmates, especially football players. This culminates when he's hazed by the football players and rescued by John and Franny. His association with his siblings improves after that as the children became more of a united unit facing bigger, external problems. The most serious of all his siblings, Frank goes on to major in economics, showing a talent for business, and eventually becomes Lilly's agent. Later, he also becomes Franny's agent and John's business partner. He is the most reserved sibling, keeping his personal life to himself while still being a generous part of the family. In his youth, Frank had a passion for taxidermy, but gave it up after the deaths of his mother and Egg. His penchant for costumes and formal pageantry remained with him for a somewhat longer period.

Lilly Berry: The second-youngest Berry child. She is small in size, probably because she is a dwarf. She is quiet and likable, and of the siblings, she is closest to Frank, possibly because compared to the others they are more reserved. Lilly often shows borderline disgust when matters of sex or bodily functions are discussed (usually by Franny), and is even portrayed as somewhat prudish about simple physical needs such as eating. She becomes a literary figure after her first book, essentially an autobiography of her family, is released. She continues to write, with Frank acting as her agent. Eventually, she succumbs to writer's block and commits suicide. She leaves a note which reads, "Sorry, just not big enough."

Egg Berry: The youngest of the Berry children. He is also the most comical of them all, though it is unintentional. An ear infection left him somewhat deaf, and his response to most statements/questions directed towards him is "What?" Egg's character is never fully formed, and he remains forever an amorphous "egg" of a child who never matures or develops due to dying at a very young age.

Win Berry: The father of the Berry children and husband of Mary Berry. He is a graduate of Harvard, but rarely applies such skills. He is more or less an entrepreneur in the field of lodging, although his success is at best unconventional. He becomes depressed when his wife, Mary, along with his youngest son, Egg, are killed in a plane crash. This state of depression slowly spirals downward, reaching a low point when he is blinded by an explosion during the foiling of the radicals' terrorist plot. He eventually affects a similar demeanor to Freud, his old friend, and begins to gain confidence again when he and his family move back to the States. He becomes an unknowing counselor at John and Frank's clinic.

Mary Berry: The mother of the Berry children and wife of Win Berry. She grew up in a very scholarly family, and is a subtle and gentle mother and devoted wife. Unfortunately, en route to Vienna, her plane crashes, killing both her and her youngest child, Egg. The Berry family decide Mary would have liked Vienna.

Freud: An old Austrian Jew, he initially trained a bear, State o' Maine, and performed at the Arbuthnot-by-the-Sea. He returned to Europe in 1939 and was imprisoned by the Nazis. He was blinded in an experiment in the concentration camps. He survived, and afterward started a hotel in Vienna. He invites Win Berry to come be his partner, which Win accepts. Their business is not entirely successful, but Freud dies a hero when he stops a terrorist plot by sacrificing his life. Win was very fond of him and seems to be a protégé of Freud.

Iowa Bob: Grandfather of the Berry children and father to Win Berry. He earned a reputation as a stalwart supporter of physical activity, and eventually accepted a position as head of the PE division at a private school in Dairy, New Hampshire, so long as his son, Win Berry, was allowed to attend the school for free. Iowa Bob later supports John when he decides to begin physical training. Iowa Bob's quest for cardiovascular perfection did not prevent him from dying "of fright" when he discovered the taxidermy version of Sorrow, the family dog, in his closet. He is best remembered by his quotes "We’re screwed down for life" (page 117) and "You’ve got to get obsessed and stay obsessed." (page 111). These quotes are often referenced to the living style of the Berry family.

Ronda Ray: More or less a housekeeper at the first Hotel New Hampshire. She has a "day room" at the hotel, and introduces John to the sexual world; though it is not love, it is nevertheless a relation of attraction. Ronda Ray also dabbles in prostitution, although she seems unaware of the unconventionality of her arrangements.

Junior Jones: African-American football player at the private school in Dairy, New Hampshire. He is quiet, and unlike most of his fellow players. He helps rescue Franny from being raped, and is a source of comfort for Franny afterward. After many years, the two marry and give their child to John and Susie.

Chipper Dove: Football player who raped Franny and was Franny's first love. Out of love-sickness, Franny remained in contact with him even after the rape. After the family moved back to the States, they encountered Chipper again, but they staged an elaborate hoax, which resulted in Chipper disappearing from their lives.

Ernst: German radical at the second Hotel New Hampshire. He is involved in a terrorist plot, but is killed by Win before it can be carried out. He resembles Chipper Dove in appearance and deportment.

Bitty Tuck: Rich, classy girl whom John was involved with during the New Year's party. Their fun is cut short when Bitty, while putting on a diaphragm in the bathroom, sees the taxidermy version of Sorrow and faints. Her nickname, "Titsie," refers to her large breasts.

Lenny Metz and Chester Pulaski: Football players who also raped Franny. They were "taken care of" by the "Black Arm of the Law."

Susie (the Bear): A young woman who meets the Berry family in Vienna, where she is assisting Freud with the hotel. Sometime before working for Freud, Susie was raped by an attacker who stuffed a paper bag over Susie's head, telling her she was too ugly to look at. The anger and indignity Susie feels after this attack cause her to adopt the costume and persona of a bear as a form of self-preservation and retreat. Freud finds Susie's ursine alter ego to be helpful in containing trouble from the colorful factions in his hotel. When Susie meets Franny, the two bond over their similar experiences and find refuge in a temporary sexual relationship. Gradually, Susie reclaims her humanity and self-confidence, and has a romantic relationship with John, but keeps the bear costume. She still suffers from a fear of producing "ugly" offspring, but becomes open to the idea of raising a (human) child when Franny asks her and John to adopt the baby she and Junior conceive.

== "Keep passing the open windows" ==
This phrase recurs throughout the novel as a catchphrase among the Berry family. It is drawn from a story that the Berry parents tell their children, about a street performer called "The King of Mice." Saying "keep passing the open windows" is the family's way of telling each other to persevere.

== Reception ==
Writing in The New York Times, John Leonard made gentle fun of the amount of promotion that Irving, a literary celebrity after the success of The World According to Garp, had done for the book, and of some of his claims in these interviews (such as that Hotel New Hampshire was a fable a child could understand), but liked the book overall: "Mr. Irving is extremely funny, at least in his novels... Whether it unravels more than it unfolds doesn't matter in the masterly telling; it enchants... And the set pieces, such as Frannie's revenge on Chipper Dove are wonderful."

== Film adaptation ==
The novel was made into a film in 1984, directed by Tony Richardson and starring Jodie Foster, Rob Lowe, and Beau Bridges.
