= John Irving =

American and Canadian novelist and screenwriter (born 1942)

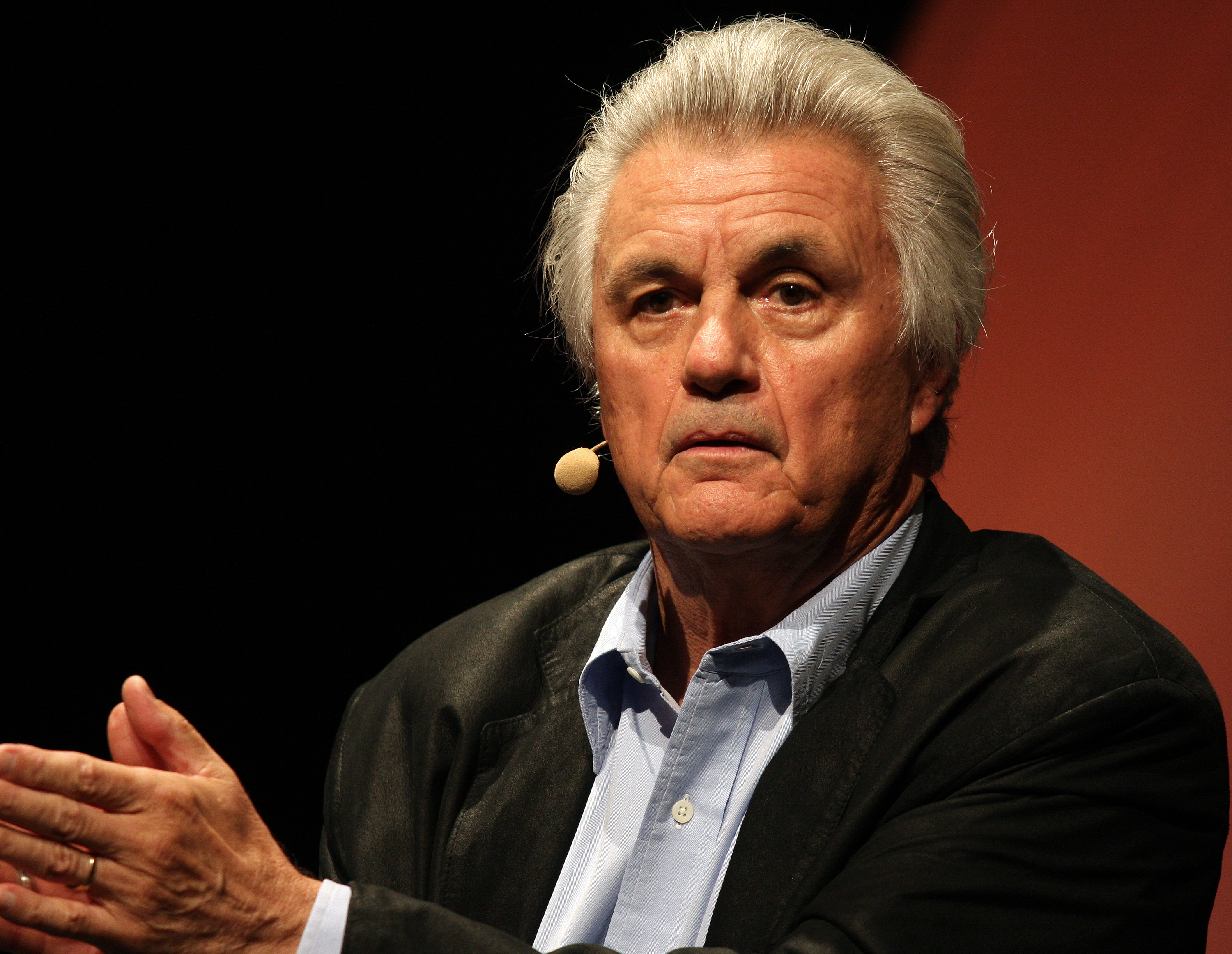
- Irving in 2010
- Born: John Wallace Blunt Jr. March 2, 1942 (age 84); Exeter, New Hampshire, U.S.
- Education: University of New Hampshire; University of Iowa
- Occupations: Novelist; screenwriter
- Writing career
- Notable works: The World According to Garp; The Cider House Rules; A Prayer for Owen Meany; A Widow for One Year
- Notable awards: Academy Award for Best Adapted Screenplay; National Book Award for Paperback General Fiction for The World According to Garp
- Website: john-irving.com

John Winslow Irving (born John Wallace Blunt Jr.; March 2, 1942) is an American and Canadian novelist, short story writer, and screenwriter.

Irving achieved critical and popular acclaim after the international success of his fourth novel The World According to Garp in 1978. Many of Irving's novels, including The Hotel New Hampshire (1981), The Cider House Rules (1985), A Prayer for Owen Meany (1989), and A Widow for One Year (1998), have been bestsellers. He won the Academy Award for Best Adapted Screenplay at the 72nd Academy Awards in 2000 for his script of the film adaptation of The Cider House Rules.

Five of his novels have been fully or partially adapted into films: The World According to Garp (1982), The Hotel New Hampshire (1984), Simon Birch (1998), The Cider House Rules (1999), and The Door in the Floor (2004). Several of Irving's books and short stories have been set in and around New England, in fictional towns resembling Exeter, New Hampshire.

Irving's novels usually center around small towns depicted in large, sprawling contexts, constituting many of his works as epic.

== Early life ==
Irving was born John Wallace Blunt Jr. in Exeter, New Hampshire, the son of Helen Frances (née Winslow) and John Wallace Blunt Sr., a writer and executive recruiter; the couple separated during pregnancy. Irving was raised by his mother and stepfather, Colin Franklin Newell Irving, who was a Phillips Exeter Academy faculty member. His uncle Hammy Bissell was part of the faculty. John Irving was in the Phillips Exeter wrestling program as a student athlete and as an assistant coach, and wrestling features prominently in his books, stories, and life. While a student at Exeter, Irving was taught by author and Christian theologian Frederick Buechner, whom he quoted in an epigraph in A Prayer for Owen Meany. Irving has dyslexia.

Irving never met his biological father, who was a pilot in the United States Army Air Forces during World War II. In July 1943, John Blunt Sr. was shot down over Burma but survived. The incident was incorporated into The Cider House Rules. Irving did not find out about his father's heroism until 1981, when he was almost 40 years old.

== Career ==
Irving's career began at the age of 26 with the publication of Setting Free the Bears (1968), his first novel. The novel was reasonably well reviewed but failed to gain a large readership. In the late 1960s, he studied under Kurt Vonnegut at the University of Iowa Writers' Workshop. His second and third novels, The Water-Method Man (1972) and The 158-Pound Marriage (1974), were similarly well received. In 1975, Irving accepted a position as assistant professor of English at Mount Holyoke College.

Frustrated at the lack of promotion his novels were receiving from his first publisher, Random House, Irving offered his fourth novel, The World According to Garp (1978), to Dutton, which promised him stronger commitment to marketing. The novel became an international bestseller and cultural phenomenon. It was a finalist for the National Book Award for Fiction in 1979 (which ultimately went to Tim O'Brien for Going After Cacciato) and its first paperback edition won the Award the next year. (Note: Garp won the 1980 award for paperback general Fiction. From 1980 to 1983 in National Book Awards history there were dual hardcover and paperback awards in most categories, and multiple fiction categories, especially in 1980. Most of the paperback award-winners were reprints, including this one.) Garp was made into a film directed by George Roy Hill, starring Robin Williams in the title role and Glenn Close as his mother; it garnered several Academy Award nominations, including nominations for Close and John Lithgow. Irving makes a brief appearance in the film as the referee in one of Garp's high school wrestling matches.

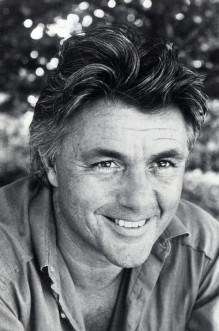
John Irving

The World According to Garp was among three books recommended to the Pulitzer Advisory Board for consideration for the 1979 Award in Fiction in the Pulitzer Jury Committee report, although the award was given to The Stories of John Cheever (1978).

Garp transformed Irving from an obscure literary writer to a household name, and his subsequent books were bestsellers. The next was The Hotel New Hampshire (1981), which sold well despite mixed reviews from critics. Like Garp, the novel was made into a film, this time directed by Tony Richardson. "Interior Space", a short story originally published in Fiction magazine in 1980, was selected for the 1981 O. Henry Prize Stories collection.

In 1985, Irving published The Cider House Rules. An epic set in a Maine orphanage, the novel's central topic is abortion. Many drew parallels between the novel and Charles Dickens' Oliver Twist (1838). Irving's next novel was A Prayer for Owen Meany (1989), another New England family epic about religion set in a New England boarding school and in Toronto, Ontario. The novel was influenced by The Tin Drum (1959) by Günter Grass, and the plot contains allusions to The Scarlet Letter (1850) by Nathaniel Hawthorne and the works of Dickens. In Owen Meany, Irving for the first time examined the consequences of the Vietnam War—particularly mandatory conscription, which Irving avoided because he was a married father when of age for the draft. Owen Meany became Irving's best selling book since Garp.

Irving returned to Random House for his next book, A Son of the Circus (1995). Arguably his most complicated and difficult book, and a departure from the themes and settings of his previous novels, it received ambivalent reviews by American critics but became a national and international bestseller on the strength of Irving's reputation for fashioning literate, engrossing page-turners. Irving returned in 1998 with A Widow for One Year, which was named a New York Times Notable Book.

In 1999, after nearly 10 years in development, Irving's screenplay for The Cider House Rules was made into a film directed by Lasse Hallström. Irving also made an appearance as a disapproving stationmaster. The film was nominated for several Academy Awards, including Best Picture, and earned Irving an Academy Award for Best Adapted Screenplay.

Irving wrote My Movie Business, a memoir about his involvement in creating the film version of The Cider House Rules. After its publication in 1999, he appeared on the CBC television program Hot Type to promote the book. During the interview, he was asked about author Tom Wolfe proclaiming the death of the modern novel. Irving said "I don't read Tom Wolfe, so I didn't hear what he said." The episode then cut to a photo of Wolfe, and Irving elaborated that Wolfe "can't write" and that his writing made Irving gag. When asked about his statements subsequently, Irving said he believed that the Hot Type interview was over and he was speaking off the record and that footage from the interview had been manipulated. Wolfe appeared on Hot Type later in 1999, calling Irving, Norman Mailer, and John Updike his "three stooges" who were panicked by his novel A Man in Full (1998).

Irving's 10th book, The Fourth Hand (2001), also became a bestseller. In 2004, A Sound Like Someone Trying Not to Make a Sound, a children's picture book originally included in A Widow for One Year, was published with illustrations by Tatjana Hauptmann. Irving's 11th novel, Until I Find You, was released on July 12, 2005.

On June 28, 2005, The New York Times published an article revealing that Until I Find You (2005) contains two personal elements about his life that he never had discussed publicly: his sexual abuse at age 11 by an older woman and the entrance in his life of his biological father's family.

In his 12th novel, Last Night in Twisted River, published in 2009, Irving's central character is a novelist with, as critic Boyd Tonkin puts it, "a career that teasingly follows Irving's own."

Irving has had four novels reach number one on the bestseller list of The New York Times: The Hotel New Hampshire (September 27, 1981), which stayed number one for seven weeks, and was in the top 15 for over 27 weeks; The Cider House Rules (June 16, 1985); A Widow for One Year (June 14, 1998); and The Fourth Hand (July 29, 2001).

== Other projects ==
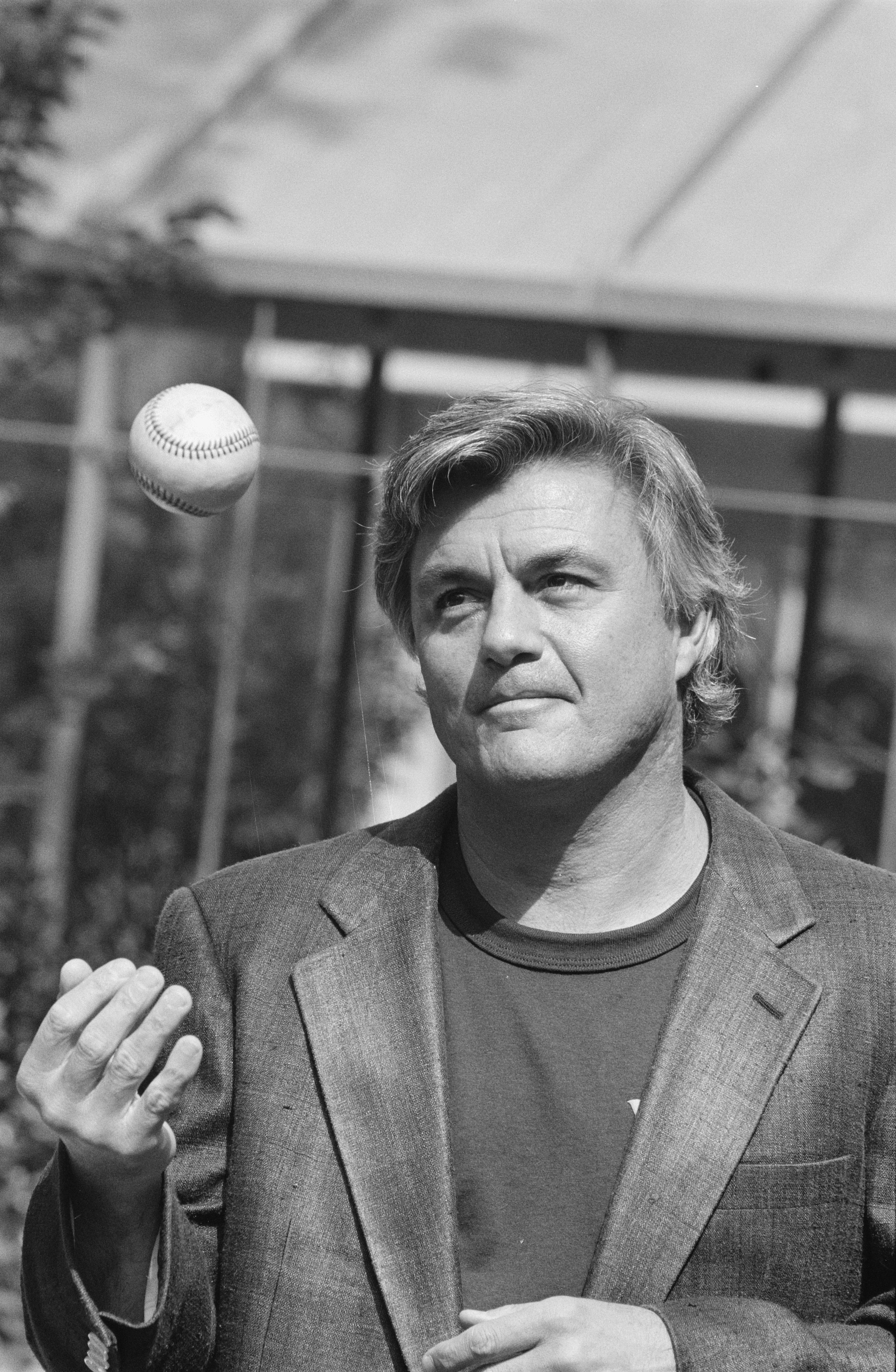
Irving in the Netherlands (1989)

Before the publication of Garp, Irving accepted short-term teaching positions (including one at his alma mater, the Iowa Writers' Workshop). He also served as an assistant coach on his sons' high school wrestling teams until he was 47 years old. Irving was inducted into the National Wrestling Hall of Fame as an Outstanding American in 1992.

In addition to his novels, he has published Trying to Save Piggy Sneed (1996), a collection of his writings including a brief memoir and unpublished short fiction, My Movie Business, an account of the protracted process of bringing The Cider House Rules to the big screen, and The Imaginary Girlfriend, a short memoir focusing on writing and wrestling. In 2000, Irving revealed that he and Tod "Kip" Williams were co-writing a screenplay for an adaptation of the novel A Widow for One Year (1998). This adaptation became The Door in the Floor, released in 2004, directed by Williams.

In 2002, his four highly regarded novels, The World According to Garp, The Cider House Rules, A Prayer for Owen Meany, and A Widow for One Year, were published in Modern Library editions. Owen Meany was adapted into the 1998 film Simon Birch (Irving required that the title and character names be changed because the screenplay's story was "markedly different" from that of the novel; Irving is on record as having enjoyed the film, however).

In 2005, Irving received the Golden Plate Award of the American Academy of Achievement.

In an interview in New York Magazine in 2009, Irving stated that he had begun work on his 13th novel inspired by Shakespeare's Richard II. In One Person is a first-person narrative. He uses the same perspective in A Prayer for Owen Meany. He also used first person in Until I Find You but changed it to third person less than a year before publication. In One Person features a 60-year-old, bisexual protagonist named William, looking back on his life in the 1950s and 1960s. The novel shares a similar theme and concern with The World According to Garp, the latter being in part about "people who hate you for your sexual differences," said Irving.

He won a Lambda Literary Award in 2013 in the Bisexual Fiction category for In One Person, and he was awarded the organization's Bridge Builder Award to honor him as an ally of the LGBT community.

On June 10, 2013, Irving announced his 14th novel, Avenue of Mysteries, named for a street in Mexico City. In an interview the previous year, he had revealed the last line of the book: "Not every collision course comes as a surprise."

On December 19, 2014, Irving posted a message on Facebook that he had "finished Avenue of Mysteries. It is a shorter novel for me, comparable in length to In One Person." Simon & Schuster published the book in November, 2015.

On November 3, 2015, Irving revealed that HBO and Warner Bros. asked him to reconstruct The World According to Garp as a miniseries. He described the project as being in the early stages. According to the byline of a February 2017 essay for The Hollywood Reporter, Irving had completed his teleplay for the five-part series based on The World According to Garp.

On June 28, 2017, Irving revealed on Facebook that his new novel was primarily a ghost story. "...I have a history of being interested in ghosts. And here come the ghosts again. In my new novel, my fifteenth, the ghosts are more prominent than before; the novel begins and ends with them. Like A Widow for One Year, this novel is constructed as a play in three acts. I'm calling Act I 'Early Signs.' I began writing it on New Year's Eve—not a bad night to start a ghost story."

In an interview with Mike Kilen for The Des Moines Register on October 26, 2017, Irving revealed that the title of his novel-in-progress was "Darkness as a Bride." The title was taken from Shakespeare's play Measure for Measure: "If I must die,/I will encounter darkness as a bride /and hug it in mine arms." He later changed the title to The Last Chairlift, keeping Claudio's line about embracing death as the epigraph. The novel was published by Simon & Schuster in October 2022.

Irving received the Richard C. Holbrooke Distinguished Achievement Award at the annual Dayton Literary Peace Prize gala on October 28, 2018.

== Works ==
=== Novels ===
- Setting Free the Bears (Random House, 1968) ISBN 0-345-21812-4
- The Water-Method Man (Random House, 1972) ISBN 0-394-47332-9
- The 158-Pound Marriage (Random House, 1974) ISBN 0-394-48414-2
- The World According to Garp (Dutton, 1978) ISBN 0-525-23770-4
- The Hotel New Hampshire (Dutton, 1981) ISBN 0-525-12800-X
- The Cider House Rules (William Morrow, 1985) ISBN 0-688-03036-X
- A Prayer for Owen Meany (William Morrow, 1989) ISBN 0-688-07708-0
- A Son of the Circus (Random House, 1994) ISBN 0-679-43496-8
- A Widow for One Year (Random House, 1998) ISBN 0-375-50137-1
- The Fourth Hand (Random House, 2001) ISBN 0-375-50627-6
- Until I Find You (Random House, 2005) ISBN 1-4000-6383-3
- Last Night in Twisted River (Random House, 2009) ISBN 1-4000-6384-1
- In One Person (Simon & Schuster, 2012) ISBN 9781451664126)
- Avenue of Mysteries (Simon & Schuster, 2015) ISBN 9781451664164)
- The Last Chairlift (Simon & Schuster, 2022) ISBN 9781501189272
- Queen Esther (Simon & Schuster, 2025) ISBN 9781501189449

=== Short fiction ===
- Trying to Save Piggy Sneed (Arcade Publishing, 1996) ISBN 1-55970-323-7

=== Other fiction ===
- The Cider House Rules: A Screenplay (1999)
- A Sound Like Someone Trying Not to Make a Sound (children's) (2004)

=== Nonfiction ===
- The Imaginary Girlfriend (1995)
- My Movie Business (1999)

=== Filmography based on writings ===
- The World According to Garp (1982)
- The Hotel New Hampshire (1984)
- Simon Birch (1998) (partly based on A Prayer for Owen Meany)
- The Cider House Rules (1999)
- The Door in the Floor (2004) (based on A Widow for One Year)

== Personal life ==
In 1964, Irving married Shyla Leary, whom he had met at Harvard University in 1963 while taking a summer course in German. They have two sons, Colin and Brendan. The couple divorced in the early 1980s. From 1981 to 1986, he lived in Manhattan and Water Mill, N.Y. with Rusty Unger, a writer, editor and film executive. Their letters have been donated to The NY Public Library. In 1987, he married Janet Turnbull, who had been his publisher at Bantam-Seal Books and is now one of his literary agents. They have one daughter, actor and writer Eva Everett Irving.

Irving has homes in Toronto and Pointe au Baril, Ontario. On December 13, 2019, Irving became a Canadian citizen. He has said he plans to keep his U.S. citizenship, reserving the right to be outspoken about the United States and his dislike of Donald Trump.

Irving was diagnosed with prostate cancer in 2007 and subsequently had a radical prostatectomy.

Irving is a cousin of the mother of academic Amy Bishop, who was convicted of perpetrating the 2010 University of Alabama in Huntsville shooting.

In 2018, Irving was an honorary degree recipient at Williams College.

Following the publication of his novel Queen Esther, Irving cites a visit to Israel in 1981 at the invitation of the Jerusalem International Book Fair and his meeting with a Holocaust survivor who invented a technique for growing asparagus in the desert, as a source of inspiration in his writing.

His grandchildren, Birk and Svea Irving are Olympic freestyle skiers.
