= The Cider House Rules (novel) =

1985 novel by John Irving

- First edition cover
- Author: John Irving
- Language: English
- Genre: Bildungsromane
- Publisher: William Morrow
- Publication date: June 1985
- Publication place: United States
- Media type: Print (Hardcover)
- Pages: 560
- ISBN: 0-688-03036-X
- OCLC: 1003368413
- Dewey Decimal: 813/.54
- LC Class: PS3559.R8 C5 1985
- Preceded by: The Hotel New Hampshire
- Followed by: A Prayer for Owen Meany

The Cider House Rules (1985) is a Bildungsroman by American writer John Irving that was later adapted into a 1999 film by Lasse Hallström and a stage play by Peter Parnell. Set in the pre- and post-World War II era, the story tells of a young man named Homer Wells growing up in an orphanage under the guidance of Dr. Wilbur Larch, an obstetrician and abortion provider. It shows Homer's coming of age as he eventually sets off on his own.

== Plot ==
Homer Wells is shown growing up in an orphanage where he spends his childhood trying to be "of use" as a medical assistant to director Dr. Wilbur Larch, whose history is told in flashbacks: After a traumatic misadventure with a prostitute as a young man, Wilbur turns his back on sex and love, choosing instead to help women with unwanted pregnancies give birth and then keeping the babies in an orphanage.

He makes a point of maintaining an emotional distance from the orphans, so that they can more easily make the transition into an adoptive family, but when it becomes clear that Homer is going to spend his childhood at the orphanage, Wilbur trains the orphan as an obstetrician and comes to love him like a son.

Wilbur's and Homer's lives are complicated by the abortions Wilbur provides. Wilbur came to this work reluctantly, but is driven by having seen the horrors of back-alley operations. Homer, upon learning Wilbur's secret, considers it morally wrong.

As a young man, Homer befriends a young unmarried couple, Candy Kendall and Wally Worthington, who come to St. Cloud's for an abortion. Homer leaves the orphanage, and returns with them to Wally's family's orchard in Heart's Rock, near the Maine coast. Wally and Homer become best friends and Homer develops a secret love for Candy. Wally goes off to serve in the Second World War and his plane is shot down over Burma. He is declared missing by the military, but Homer and Candy both believe he is dead and move on with their lives, which includes beginning a romantic relationship. When Candy becomes pregnant, they go back to St. Cloud's Orphanage, where their son is born and named Angel.

Subsequently, Wally is found in Burma and returns home, paralyzed from the waist down. He is still able to have sexual intercourse but is sterile due to an infection caught in Burma. Homer and Candy lie to the family about Angel's parentage, claiming that Homer had adopted him. Wally and Candy marry shortly afterward, but Candy and Homer maintain a secret affair that lasts some 15 years.

Many years later, teenaged Angel falls in love with Rose, the daughter of the head migrant worker at the apple orchard. Rose becomes pregnant by her father, and Homer aborts her child. Homer decides to return to the orphanage after Wilbur's death, to work as the new director. Though he maintains his distaste for abortions, he continues Dr. Larch's legacy of performing the procedure for those in need, and he dreams of the day when abortions are legal.

The name "The Cider House Rules" refers to the list of rules that migrant workers are supposed to follow at the Ocean View Orchards. However, none of them can read, and they are completely unaware of the rules—which have been posted for years.

A subplot follows the character Melony, who grew up alongside Homer in the orphanage. She was Homer's first girlfriend. After Homer leaves the orphanage, so does she in an effort to find him. She eventually becomes an electrician and takes a female lover, Lorna. Melony is stoic, who refuses to press charges against a man who brutally broke her nose and arm. She intends to later take revenge. She is the catalyst that transforms Homer from his comfortable, but not entirely admirable, position at the apple orchard into Dr. Larch's replacement.

== Background ==
Wally's experience getting shot down over Burma was based in part on that of Irving's biological father (whom he never met), who was shot down over Burma and survived.

== Film adaptation ==
The novel was adapted into a film released in 1999 directed by Lasse Hallström, starring Tobey Maguire as Homer Wells.
