= The World According to Garp =

1978 novel by John Irving

- First edition
- Author: John Irving
- Publisher: E. P. Dutton
- Publication date: 1978
- Publication place: United States
- Pages: 609
- ISBN: 0-525-23770-4
- OCLC: 3345460
- Dewey Decimal: 813/.5/4
- LC Class: PZ4.I714 Wo 1978 PS3559.R8
- Preceded by: The 158-Pound Marriage
- Followed by: The Hotel New Hampshire

The World According to Garp is a 1978 novel by John Irving, his fourth. It follows T. S. Garp, who is conceived when his mother, Jenny Fields, a nurse, rapes a severely brain-damaged soldier in her care, and who grows up to become a novelist. The book was a bestseller for several years. It was a finalist for the National Book Award for Fiction in 1979, and its first paperback edition won the award the following year. (Note: Garp won the 1980 award for paperback general Fiction. From 1980 to 1983 in National Book Awards history there were dual hardcover and paperback awards in most categories, and multiple fiction categories, especially in 1980. Most of the paperback award-winners were reprints, including this one.)

== Synopsis ==
Jenny Fields is a strong-willed nurse who wants a child but not a husband. A dying ball turret gunner known only as Technical Sergeant Garp, who was severely brain damaged in combat, is admitted to the ICU where Jenny works. She nurses Garp, observing his infantile state and frequent erections. Unconstrained by convention and driven by her desire for a child, Jenny impregnates herself by raping the brain-damaged soldier, and names the bastard son "T. S. Garp" (derived from "Technical Sergeant"). Jenny raises the young Garp alone, taking a position as the live-in nurse at an all-boys preparatory school in New England.

Garp grows up, becoming interested in sex, wrestling, and writing fiction—three topics in which his mother has little interest. After his graduation in 1961, his mother takes him to Vienna, where he writes his first novella. At the same time, his mother begins writing her autobiography, A Sexual Suspect. After Jenny and Garp return to Steering, Garp marries Helen, the wrestling coach's daughter, and begins his family—he a struggling writer, she a professor of English. The publication of A Sexual Suspect makes his mother famous. She becomes a feminist icon, because feminists view her book as a manifesto of a woman who does not care to bind herself to a man, and who chooses to raise a child on her own. She nurtures and supports women traumatized by men, among them the Ellen Jamesians, a group of women named after an eleven-year-old girl whose tongue was cut out by her rapists to silence her. The members of the group cut out their own tongues in solidarity with Ellen, even though James herself opposes the practice.

Garp becomes a devoted parent, wrestling with anxiety for the safety of his children. He and his family inevitably experience dark and violent events through which the characters change and grow. Garp learns (often painfully) from the women in his life (including transgender ex-football player Roberta Muldoon), who are struggling to become more tolerant in the face of intolerance. The story contains a great deal of (in the words of Garp's fictional teacher) "lunacy and sorrow".

The novel contains several narratives: Garp's first piece of fiction, a short story entitled "The Pension Grillparzer"; "Vigilance", an essay; and the first chapter of his third novel, The World According to Bensenhaver. The book also contains some motifs that appear in other Irving novels: bears, New England, Vienna, hotels, wrestling, a person who prefers abstinence over sex, and adultery.

== Background ==
John Irving's mother, Frances Winslow, had not been married at the time of his conception, and Irving never met his biological father. As a child, he was not told anything about his father, and he told his mother that unless she gave him some information about his biological father, in his writing he would invent the father and the circumstances of how she got pregnant. Winslow replied, "Go ahead, dear."

In 1981, Time magazine quoted the novelist's mother as saying "There are parts of Garp that are too explicit for me."

== Analysis ==
Themes of the novel include feminism, gender formation, American politics after the Vietnam War, and how family structures changed during this time. The book uses elements of metafiction and follows a symmetrical, Dickensian narrative that is resolved in the final chapter: "Life After Garp". The book also responds to the postmodernism movement.

== Adaptations ==
A movie adaptation of the novel starring Robin Williams was released in 1982, directed by George Roy Hill with a screenplay written by Steve Tesich. Irving said that Hill asked him to write the screenplay but he declined because of how Hill's film would treat the character of Roberta Muldoon. Irving continued:

George was a World War II guy; he couldn’t see past the comedic part of a transgender woman who’d been an NFL player. A pity, because John Lithgow, who was cast as Roberta in the film, could have played her as I wrote her. Roberta is a force of normality in an otherwise extreme world; she is the only character who loves Garp and his mother equally, the only character who isn’t in a rage about someone or something. I declined to write the “Garp” script because George wouldn’t do Roberta my way.

BBC Radio 4's Classic Serial broadcast a three-part adaptation of the novel by Linda Marshall Griffiths in January 2014. The production was directed by Nadia Molinari and featured Miranda Richardson as Jenny, Lee Ingleby as Garp, Jonathan Keeble as Roberta and Lyndsey Marshal as Helen.

On 3 November 2015, Irving revealed that he'd been approached by HBO and Warner Brothers to reconstruct The World According to Garp as a miniseries. He described the project as being in the early stages. According to the byline of a self-penned, 20 February 2017 essay for The Hollywood Reporter, Irving completed his teleplay for the five-part series based on The World According to Garp.
