= Bread and butter =

Bread and butter may refer to:

== Cuisine ==
- Bread, paired with butter, a staple of western diet.
- Bread and butter pickles
- Bread and butter pudding, a British dish
- Butterbrot, a German dish
- Smörgås, a Swedish dish
- Smørrebrød, a Danish dish
- Tartine, a dish originating in France and found in many other Francophone countries
- Voileipä, a Finnish dish
- Brun maska, an Iranian dish, served in Irani cafes in Mumbai
- Bread and butter cut, a cut of chuck steak
- Bread+Butter, a restaurant at The Borgata
- Bread-and-butter plate

== Music ==
- "Bread and Butter" (song), 1964 song by the Newbeats
- Bread & Butter (album), 1964 debut album of the Newbeats
- "Bread & Butter" (song), a 2023 song by Gunna
- "Bread and Butter", a song by Larry Clinton, the flip side on "How High the Moon"
- "Bread and Butter", a song by Ivor Cutler on the album Velvet Donkey
- "Bread and Butter", a song by Radio and Weasel released by Goodlyfe Crew
- "Bread And Butter", a single by Robert John
- "Bread 'n Butter", a song by The Lovables and Bobby Sheen
- "Bread & Butter", a song by The Roots on the album Game Theory
- "Bread & Butter", a song by Beanie Sigel on the album The B. Coming
- "Bread and Butter", a song by The Waitresses on the album I Could Rule the World If I Could Only Get the Parts
- Bread & Butter, a Japanese folk duo, written for by Akiko Kobayashi

== Art and media ==
- Bread N' Butter, a TV series
- Bread and Butter, a 1914 play by Eugene O'Neill
- Bread and Butter, a 1966 play by Cecil Philip Taylor
- "The Bread And Butter", a Flying the Flag episode
- "El pan nuestro" ("Bread and butter"), a poem by José Pedroni

== Other uses ==
- Bread & Butter (tradeshow)
- Bread and Butter (playboating)
- Bread and butter (superstition)
- Bread and butter construction, a type of wooden ship model construction
- Linaria vulgaris, a plant
- Bread and butter appearance, a medical condition caused by uremic pericarditis

== See also ==
- "Bread and Butter Man", a song by The Nashville Teens
- Bread and Butter Women, a 1930s play by Patrick White
- His Bread and Butter, a 1916 film by Triangle Film Corporation
- Buttered toast
