= Run Baby Run =

Run Baby Run may refer to:

== Music ==
- "Run, Baby Run (Back Into My Arms)", 1965 by The Newbeats
  - Run Baby Run, a 1965 album by The Newbeats
- "Run Baby Run" (Amanda Lear song), 1978
- "Run Baby Run" (Sheryl Crow song), 1993
- "Run Baby Run" (Garbage song), 2005
- "Run Baby Run", a song by Bustafunk feat. Andrew Roachford
- "Run Baby Run", a song by Deadstar

== Other media ==
- Run Baby Run, a 1968 autobiography by Nicky Cruz
- Run Baby Run (video game), a 1983 ZX Spectrum game
- Run Baby Run (2006 film), a Ghanaian action film directed by Emmanuel Apea
- Run Baby Run (2012 film), a Malayalam-language comedy thriller directed by Joshiy
- Run Baby Run (2023 film), a Tamil-language action thriller film directed by Jiyen Krishnakumar
- "Run Baby Run" (Doctors), a 2004 television episode

== Sports ==
- Yanitelli Center, currently known as the Run Baby Run Arena
