= Classic Rock (Time-Life Music) =

Rock music compilation series

Classic Rock was a 31-volume series issued by Time Life during the late 1980s and early 1990s. The series spotlighted popular music played on Top 40 radio stations of the mid-to-late-1960s.

Much like Time-Life's other series chronicling popular music, volumes in the "Classic Rock" series covered a specific time period, including single years in some volumes and stylistic trends in others. Each volume was issued on a compact disc, cassette or (on volumes issued through 1990) 2-LP vinyl record set. Individual volumes generally contained 22 tracks, and represented the highlighted time period's most popular and noteworthy tracks. Also included was a booklet, containing liner notes written by some of the most respected historians of the genre, photographs of the artists, and information on the songs (writers, performers and peak position on Billboard magazine's Hot 100 chart).

== History ==
"Classic Rock" was first issued in the winter of 1988, with the first volume in the series titled Classic Rock: 1965. Like most compilation albums, songs by two of the era's most successful groups – The Beatles and The Rolling Stones – were not included due to licensing issues; however, several albums had cover art with drawings of male rock singers resembling The Beatles.

As was the case with Time-Life's other series, "Classic Rock" was advertised in television and magazine advertisements. The series was available by subscription (by calling a 1-800 number); those who purchased the series in that fashion received a new volume roughly every other month (on the format of their choice), and had the option of keeping the volumes they wanted.

Each volume was also offered for individual sale. When the series was fully issued, a customer could purchase the entire series at once (or a group of albums, as packaged by Time-Life as part of a promotion), often at a discounted price.

New volumes continued to be issued through 1991, the final one being a volume titled Classic Rock: Rock Renaissance IV (an album of hard rock from the mid- to late-1960s). An additional volume, titled Totally Fantastic '60s, was released in 1996.

Time-Life continued to offer "Classic Rock" through the early-2000s (decade), after which it was replaced by other series.

In 1999, Time-Life issued a "budget" box set, "Classic '60s: Greatest Hits", containing three CDs or cassettes of 12 songs each, for retail sale.

== The series ==
=== Album listing ===
As with many of Time-Life Records' multi-volume releases, the volumes were not issued in a logical, sequential order by date or era of the subject; that is, issuing volumes covering 1964 before progressing to 1965. In the track information section, the volumes will be listed sequentially by era; the following list is the order in which the volumes were released.

==== 1988 ====
- Classic Rock: 1965
- Classic Rock: 1966
- Classic Rock: 1964
- Classic Rock: 1968
- Classic Rock: 1967
- Classic Rock: 1969
- Classic Rock: 1966: The Beat Goes On
- Classic Rock: 1965: The Beat Goes On
- Classic Rock: 1964: The Beat Goes On
- Classic Rock: 1967: The Beat Goes On

==== 1989 ====
- Classic Rock: 1968: The Beat Goes On
- Classic Rock: 1969: The Beat Goes On
- Classic Rock: 1966: Shakin' All Over
- Classic Rock: 1965: Shakin' All Over
- Classic Rock: 1967: Shakin' All Over
- Classic Rock: 1964: Shakin' All Over
- Classic Rock: Rock Renaissance
- Classic Rock: Creedence Clearwater Revival
- Classic Rock: 1968: Shakin' All Over

==== 1990 ====
- Classic Rock: 1969: Shakin' All Over
- Classic Rock: Rock Renaissance II
- Classic Rock: 1966: Blowin' Your Mind
- Classic Rock: 1965: Blowin' Your Mind
- Classic Rock: 1967: Blowin' Your Mind
- Classic Rock: On the Soul Side
- Classic Rock: Rock Renaissance III
- Classic Rock: 1968: Blowin' Your Mind
- Classic Rock: On the Soul Side II

==== 1991 ====
- Classic Rock: Bubblegum, Garage and Pop Nuggets
- Classic Rock: Rock Renaissance IV

==== 1996 ====
- Classic Rock: Totally Fantastic '60s

=== Track listing ===
==== 1964 (1989 re-issue 25 tracks) ====
- "Do Wah Diddy Diddy" - Manfred Mann
- "She's Not There" - The Zombies
- "What Kind of Fool (Do You Think I Am)" - The Tams
- "You Never Can Tell" - Chuck Berry
- "Bread and Butter" - The Newbeats
- "Come See About Me" - Diana Ross & The Supremes
- "Needles and Pins" - Searchers
- "I Get Around" - The Beach Boys
- "How Do You Do It" - Gerry and the Pacemakers
- "Farmer John" - The Premiers
- "Out of Limits" - The Marketts
- "Nobody I Know" - Peter & Gordon
- "Remember (Walking in the Sand)" - The Shangri-Las
- "Hippy Hippy Shake" - The Swinging Blue Jeans
- "You Really Got Me" - The Kinks
- "Dead Man's Curve" - Jan & Dean
- "Bad to Me" - Billy J. Kramer with the Dakotas
- "The Way You Do the Things You Do" - The Temptations
- "A Summer Song" - Chad and Jeremy
- "Fun, Fun, Fun" - The Beach Boys
- "I Like It" - Gerry and the Pacemakers
- "Come a Little Bit Closer" - Jay & The Americans
- "A World Without Love" - Peter & Gordon
- "Stop and Think It Over" - Dale & Grace
- "I'm So Proud" - The Impressions

==== 1964: The Beat Goes On ====
- "Have I the Right?" - The Honeycombs
- "Where Did Our Love Go" - Diana Ross & The Supremes
- "People Say" - The Dixie Cups
- "Mercy Mercy" - Don Covay
- "Popsicles and Icicles" - The Murmaids
- "It's Over" - Roy Orbison
- "Louie Louie" - The Kingsmen
- "Give Him a Great Big Kiss" - The Shangri-Las
- "Keep On Pushing" - The Impressions
- "Oh No Not My Baby" - Maxine Brown
- "When I Grow Up (To Be a Man)" - The Beach Boys
- "Love Potion No. 9" - The Searchers
- "(Just Like) Romeo and Juliet" - The Reflections
- "How Sweet It Is (To Be Loved by You)" - Marvin Gaye
- "I Wanna Love Him So Bad" - The Jelly Beans
- "Baby I Need Your Loving" - Four Tops
- "I'm Gonna Be Strong" - Gene Pitney
- "Hey Little Cobra" - Rip Chords
- "Penetration" - The Pyramids
- "The Name Game" - Shirley Ellis
- "You're a Wonderful One" - Marvin Gaye
- "Amen" - The Impressions

==== 1964: Shakin' All Over ====
- "Oh, Pretty Woman" - Roy Orbison
- "Um, Um, Um, Um, Um, Um" – Major Lance
- "I Don't Want to See You Again" – Peter & Gordon
- "Nadine (Is It You?)" – Chuck Berry
- "Every Little Bit Hurts" – Brenda Holloway
- "Don't Worry Baby" – The Beach Boys
- "Little Honda" – The Hondells
- "Haunted House" – Jumpin' Gene Simmons
- "Needle In a Haystack" – The Velvelettes
- "Walk On By" – Dionne Warwick
- "Don't Let the Sun Catch You Crying" – Gerry and the Pacemakers
- "Baby Love" – The Supremes
- "Don't Throw Your Love Away" – The Searchers
- "Walk, Don't Run '64" – The Ventures
- "Too Many Fish in the Sea" – The Marvelettes
- "I'm on the Outside (Looking In)" – Little Anthony & the Imperials
- "Saturday Night at the Movies (song)" - The Drifters
- "Steal Away" – Jimmy Hughes
- "Ain't Nothing You Can Do" – Bobby Bland
- "Drag City" – Jan & Dean
- "Quicksand" – Martha and the Vandellas
- "Talking About My Baby" – The Impressions
- "Mr. Lonely" – Bobby Vinton

==== 1965 ====
- "Mr. Tambourine Man" - The Byrds
- "For Your Love" - The Yardbirds
- "In the Midnight Hour" - Wilson Pickett
- "The Tracks of My Tears" - The Miracles
- "Just a Little" - The Beau Brummels
- "You've Lost That Lovin' Feelin'" - The Righteous Brothers
- "My Girl" - The Temptations
- "Wooly Bully" - Sam the Sham and the Pharaohs
- "Down in the Boondocks" - Billy Joe Royal
- "Help Me, Rhonda" - The Beach Boys
- "Baby I'm Yours" - Barbara Lewis
- "Do You Believe in Magic" - The Lovin' Spoonful
- "I Can't Help Myself (Sugar Pie Honey Bunch)" - Four Tops
- "Tired of Waiting for You" - The Kinks
- "Hang On Sloopy" - The McCoys
- "Heart Full of Soul" - The Yardbirds
- "Shotgun" - Junior Walker & the All-Stars
- "I Got You Babe" - Sonny & Cher
- "Liar, Liar" - The Castaways
- "Back in My Arms Again" - Diana Ross & The Supremes
- "This Diamond Ring" - Gary Lewis & the Playboys
- "A Lover's Concerto" - The Toys

==== 1965: The Beat Goes On ====
- "Eve of Destruction" - Barry McGuire
- "Rescue Me" - Fontella Bass
- "1-2-3" - Len Barry
- "California Girls" - The Beach Boys
- "Laugh, Laugh" - The Beau Brummels
- "Ooo Baby Baby" - The Miracles
- "All Day and All of the Night" - The Kinks
- "Nowhere to Run" - Martha and the Vandellas
- "Treat Her Right" - Roy Head
- "The Boy from New York City" - The Ad Libs
- "I've Been Loving You Too Long" - Otis Redding
- "Turn, Turn, Turn (To Everything There is a Season) - The Byrds
- "It's the Same Old Song" - Four Tops
- "Jenny Take a Ride" - Mitch Ryder & the Detroit Wheels
- "She's About a Mover" - Sir Douglas Quintet
- "I Hear a Symphony" - The Supremes
- "I Can Never Go Home Anymore" - The Shangri-Las
- "Keep on Dancing" - The Gentrys
- "I'll Be Doggone" - Marvin Gaye
- "It Ain't Me Babe" - The Turtles
- "Hold What You've Got" - Joe Tex
- "I'm a Man" - The Yardbirds

==== 1965: Shakin' All Over ====
- "Papa's Got a Brand New Bag" - James Brown
- "Tell Her No" - The Zombies
- "Ride Your Pony" - Lee Dorsey
- "All I Really Want to Do" - Cher
- "I Go to Pieces" - Peter and Gordon
- "What the World Needs Now Is Love" - Jackie DeShannon
- "Land of a Thousand Dances" - Cannibal & the Headhunters
- "Count Me In" - Gary Lewis & the Playboys
- "The Jerk" - The Larks
- "You're the One" - The Vogues
- "Set Me Free" - The Kinks
- "Unchained Melody" - The Righteous Brothers
- "Stop! In the Name of Love" - The Supremes
- "Ain't That Peculiar" - Marvin Gaye
- "I Want Candy" - The Strangeloves
- "I'm Telling You Now" - Freddie and the Dreamers
- "Make Me Your Baby" - Barbara Lewis
- "People Get Ready" - The Impressions
- "Downtown" - Petula Clark
- "Shakin' All Over" - The Guess Who
- "You Were on My Mind" - We Five
- "It's Growing" - The Temptations
- "Yes, I'm Ready" - Barbara Mason

==== 1965: Blowin' Your Mind ====
- "Here Comes the Night" - Them
- "Game of Love" - Wayne Fontana & the Mindbenders
- "Since I Lost My Baby" - The Temptations
- "The 'In' Crowd" - Dobie Gray
- "Respect" - Otis Redding
- "Baby Don't Go" - Sonny & Cher
- "The Birds and the Bees" - Jewel Akens
- "I'm a Fool" - Dino, Desi & Billy
- "Who'll Be the Next in Line" - The Kinks
- "You Tell Me Why" - The Beau Brummels
- "Ferry Cross the Mersey" - Gerry and the Pacemakers
- "Iko Iko" - The Dixie Cups
- "Save Your Heart for Me" - Gary Lewis & the Playboys
- "Run, Baby Run (Back Into My Arms)" - The Newbeats
- "Don't Fight It" - Wilson Pickett
- "Ask the Lonely" - Four Tops
- "Laugh at Me" - Sonny
- "Agent Double-O Soul" - Edwin Starr
- "You Turn Me On" - Ian Whitcomb
- "Nothing but Heartaches" - The Supremes
- "Go Now" - The Moody Blues
- "Hurt So Bad" - Little Anthony & the Imperials

==== 1966 ====
- "Good Vibrations" - The Beach Boys
- "(I Know) I'm Losing You" - The Temptations
- "Good Lovin'" - The Young Rascals
- "Dirty Water" - The Standells
- "Sunshine Superman" - Donovan
- "Tell It Like It Is" - Aaron Neville
- "Summer in the City" - The Lovin' Spoonful
- "Standing in the Shadows of Love" - Four Tops
- "I Fought the Law" - The Bobby Fuller Four
- "Beauty Is Only Skin Deep" - The Temptations
- "When a Man Loves a Woman" - Percy Sledge
- "Reach Out I'll Be There" - Four Tops
- "Gloria" - The Shadows of Knight
- "Barbara Ann" - The Beach Boys
- "Shapes of Things" - The Yardbirds
- "Did You Ever Have to Make Up Your Mind?" - The Lovin' Spoonful
- "Monday, Monday" - The Mamas & the Papas
- "You Keep Me Hangin' On" - The Supremes
- "Wild Thing" - The Troggs
- "I'm a Believer" - The Monkees
- "Kicks" - Paul Revere & the Raiders
- "Psychotic Reaction" - Count Five

==== 1966: The Beat Goes On ====
- "Eight Miles High" - The Byrds
- "California Dreamin'" - The Mamas & the Papas
- "Walk Away Renée" - The Left Banke
- "Hold On, I'm Comin'" - Sam & Dave
- "Mellow Yellow" - Donovan
- "Wouldn't It Be Nice" - The Beach Boys
- "Hanky Panky" - Tommy James and the Shondells
- "Lies" - The Knickerbockers
- "My World Is Empty Without You" - The Supremes
- "Lightnin' Strikes" - Lou Christie
- "Daydream" - The Lovin' Spoonful
- "Hungry" - Paul Revere & the Raiders
- "Cool Jerk" - The Capitols
- "Devil with the Blue Dress On/Good Golly Miss Molly" - Mitch Ryder & the Detroit Wheels
- "Last Train to Clarksville" - The Monkees
- "Going to a Go-Go" - The Miracles
- "Time Won't Let Me" - The Outsiders
- "Uptight (Everything's Alright)" - Stevie Wonder
- "Black Is Black" - Los Bravos
- "Land of 1000 Dances" - Wilson Pickett
- "Along Comes Mary" - The Association
- "Over Under Sideways Down" - The Yardbirds

==== 1966: Shakin' All Over ====
- "These Boots Are Made for Walkin'" - Nancy Sinatra
- "Stop Stop Stop" - The Hollies
- "Ain't Too Proud to Beg" - The Temptations
- "Double Shot (Of My Baby's Love)" - The Swingin' Medallions
- "I'm Your Puppet" - James & Bobby Purify
- "What Becomes of the Brokenhearted" - Jimmy Ruffin
- "Li'l Red Riding Hood" - Sam the Sham & the Pharaohs
- "Working in the Coal Mine" - Lee Dorsey
- "Little Girl" - Syndicate of Sound
- "This Old Heart of Mine (Is Weak for You)" - The Isley Brothers
- "You Didn't Have to Be So Nice" - The Lovin' Spoonful
- "Five O'Clock World" - The Vogues
- "Just Like Me" - Paul Revere & the Raiders
- "(You're My) Soul and Inspiration" - The Righteous Brothers
- "Don't Mess with Bill" - The Marvelettes
- "634-5789 (Soulsville, U.S.A.)" - Wilson Pickett
- "A Well Respected Man" - The Kinks
- "Bang Bang (My Baby Shot Me Down)" - Cher
- "Red Rubber Ball" - The Cyrkle
- "Knock on Wood" - Eddie Floyd
- "Barefootin'" - Robert Parker
- "Sweet Talkin' Guy" - The Chiffons

==== 1966: Blowin' Your Mind ====
- "Bus Stop" - The Hollies
- "You Can't Hurry Love" - The Supremes
- "Sunny Afternoon" - The Kinks
- "A Groovy Kind of Love" - The Mindbenders
- "Sunny" - Bobby Hebb
- "Baby, Scratch My Back" - Slim Harpo
- "Gloria" - Them
- "(I'm a) Road Runner" - Jr. Walker & the All Stars
- "Get Ready" - The Temptations
- "I Saw Her Again Last Night" - The Mamas & the Papas
- "Warm and Tender Love" - Percy Sledge
- "Summertime" - Billy Stewart
- "The Cheater" - Bob Kuban and the In-Men
- "Rhapsody in the Rain" - Lou Christie
- "Turn-Down Day" - The Cyrkle
- "Sloop John B" - The Beach Boys
- "Oh How Happy" - Shades of Blue
- "Elusive Butterfly" - Bob Lind
- "You Baby" - The Turtles
- "But It's Alright" - J. J. Jackson
- "Holy Cow" - Lee Dorsey
- "Love Makes the World Go Round" - Deon Jackson

==== 1967 ====
- "Somebody to Love" - Jefferson Airplane
- "The Letter" - The Box Tops
- "Happy Together" - The Turtles
- "Dedicated to the One I Love" - The Mamas & the Papas
- "Love Is Here and Now You're Gone" - The Supremes
- "Groovin'" - The Young Rascals
- "(Your Love Keeps Lifting Me) Higher and Higher" - Jackie Wilson
- "I Think We're Alone Now" - Tommy James and the Shondells
- "I Second That Emotion" - Smokey Robinson & the Miracles
- "San Francisco (Be Sure to Wear Flowers in Your Hair) - Scott McKenzie
- "A Whiter Shade of Pale" - Procol Harum
- "Respect" - Aretha Franklin
- "Kind of a Drag" - The Buckinghams
- "Good Thing" - Paul Revere & the Raiders
- "I Heard It Through the Grapevine" - Gladys Knight & the Pips
- "Funky Broadway" - Wilson Pickett
- "Incense and Peppermints" - Strawberry Alarm Clock
- "Sweet Soul Music" - Arthur Conley
- "I Had Too Much to Dream (Last Night)" - The Electric Prunes
- "Little Bit O' Soul" - The Music Explosion
- "Bernadette" - Four Tops
- "Daydream Believer" - The Monkees

==== 1967: The Beat Goes On ====
- "I Was Made to Love Her" - Stevie Wonder
- "Gimme Little Sign" - Brenton Wood
- "Let's Live for Today" - The Grass Roots
- "Soul Man" - Sam & Dave
- "Brown Eyed Girl" - Van Morrison
- "Your Precious Love" - Marvin Gaye & Tammi Terrell
- "Carrie Anne" - The Hollies
- "Jimmy Mack" - Martha and the Vandellas
- "Nashville Cats" - The Lovin' Spoonful
- "Mercy, Mercy, Mercy" - The Buckinghams
- "(You Make Me Feel Like) A Natural Woman" - Aretha Franklin
- "Expressway to Your Heart" - The Soul Survivors
- "You're My Everything" - The Temptations
- "Western Union" - Five Americans
- "Get on Up" - The Esquires
- "(We Ain't Got) Nothin' Yet" - Blues Magoos
- "Pleasant Valley Sunday" - The Monkees
- "Gimme Some Lovin'" - The Spencer Davis Group
- "Him or Me – What's It Gonna Be?" - Paul Revere & the Raiders
- "Sock It to Me Baby" - Mitch Ryder & the Detroit Wheels
- "The Happening" - The Supremes
- "A Little Bit Me, a Little Bit You" - The Monkees

==== 1967: Shakin' All Over ====
- "I'm A Man" - Spencer Davis Group
- "Ain't No Mountain High Enough" - Marvin Gaye & Tammi Terrell
- "On a Carousel" - The Hollies
- "Apples, Peaches, Pumpkin Pie" - Jay & the Techniques
- "(I'm Not Your) Steppin' Stone" - The Monkees
- "Tramp" Otis Redding & Carla Thomas
- "Friday On My Mind" - Easybeats
- "Tell Mama" - Etta James
- "Boogaloo Down Broadway" - Fantastic Johnny C
- "Creeque Alley" - The Mamas & the Papas
- "Dry Your Eyes" - Brenda & the Tabulations
- "Windy" - The Association
- "98.6" - Keith
- "Reflections" - Diana Ross & The Supremes
- "Talk Talk" - Music Machine
- "Baby I Love You" - Aretha Franklin
- "Society's Child" - Janis Ian
- "She'd Rather Be with Me" - The Turtles
- "The Beat Goes On" - Sonny & Cher
- "I've Been Lonely Too Long" - The Rascals
- "Soul Finger" - Bar-Kays
- "Ode to Billie Joe" - Bobbie Gentry

==== 1967: Blowin' Your Mind ====
- "So You Want to Be a Rock 'n' Roll Star" - The Byrds
- "Heroes and Villains" - The Beach Boys
- "Words of Love" - The Mamas & the Papas
- "It Takes Two" - Marvin Gaye and Kim Weston"
- "Everlasting Love" - Robert Knight
- "Close Your Eyes" - Peaches & Herb
- "Shake a Tail Feather" - James and Bobby Purify
- "Skinny Legs and All" - Joe Tex
- "The Hunter Gets Captured by the Game" - The Marvelettes
- "Here Comes My Baby" - The Tremeloes
- "Try a Little Tenderness" - Otis Redding
- "Seven Rooms of Gloom" - The Four Tops
- "Pata Pata" - Miriam Makeba
- "Honey Chile" - Martha Reeves and the Vandellas
- "Then You Can Tell Me Goodbye" - The Casinos
- "New York Mining Disaster 1941" - Bee Gees
- "Darling Be Home Soon" - The Lovin' Spoonful
- "Neon Rainbow" - The Box Tops
- "Let It Out (Let It All Hang Out)" - The Hombres
- "She's My Girl" - The Turtles
- "How Can I Be Sure" - The Young Rascals
- "I Never Loved a Man (The Way I Love You)" - Aretha Franklin

==== 1968 ====
- "Born To Be Wild" - Steppenwolf
- "Cry Like a Baby" - Box Tops
- "Crimson and Clover" - Tommy James & The Shondells
- "I Thank You" - Sam & Dave
- "Love Is All Around" - Troggs
- "(Sittin' On) The Dock of the Bay" - Otis Redding
- "Sunshine of Your Love" - Cream
- "Everyday People" - Sly & The Family Stone
- "Pictures of Matchstick Men" - Status Quo
- "(Sweet Sweet Baby) Since You've Been Gone" - Aretha Franklin
- "Hurdy Gurdy Man" - Donovan
- "Abraham, Martin and John" - Dion
- "Cloud Nine" - Temptations
- "Midnight Confessions" - Grass Roots
- "On the Road Again" - Canned Heat
- "Tighten Up - Archie Bell & The Drells
- "A Beautiful Morning" - Rascals
- "La La Means I Love You" - Delfonics
- "You Keep Me Hangin' On" - Vanilla Fudge
- "Love Child" - Diana Ross & The Supremes
- "Valleri - The Monkees
- "Think" - Aretha Franklin
- "Who's Making Love" - Johnnie Taylor
- "Like to Get to Know You" - Spanky & Our Gang

==== 1968: The Beat Goes On ====
- "Nobody But Me" - Human Beinz
- "Magic Carpet Ride" - Steppenwolf
- "Mony Mony" - Tommy James & The Shondells
- "Cowboys to Girls" - Intruders
- "People Got to Be Free" - Rascals
- "Ain't Nothing Like the Real Thing" - Marvin Gaye & Tammi Terrell
- "I Heard It Through the Grapevine" - Marvin Gaye
- "Soulful Strut" - Young-Holt Unlimited
- "Eleanore" - The Turtles
- "With a Little Help from My Friends" - Joe Cocker
- "I Wish It Would Rain" - The Temptations
- "Dance to the Music" - Sly & The Family Stone
- "Girl Watcher" - O'Kaysions
- "Itchycoo Park" - Small Faces
- "Green Tambourine" - Lemon Pipers
- "Chain Of Fools" - Aretha Franklin
- "Slip Away" - Clarence Carter
- "There Is" - Dells
- "Bend Me, Shape Me" - American Breed
- "Bottle of Wine" - The Fireballs
- "Just Dropped In (To See What Condition My Condition Was In) - The First Edition
- "Hush - Deep Purple

==== 1968: Shakin' All Over ====
- "All Along the Watchtower" - Jimi Hendrix Experience
- "Piece of My Heart" - Big Brother & The Holding Company
- "The House That Jack Built" - Aretha Franklin
- "The Horse" - Cliff Nobles & Company
- "Spooky" - Classics IV
- "You're All I Need To Get By" - Marvin Gaye & Tammi Terrell
- "Summertime Blues" - Blue Cheer
- "I Love You" - People
- "Jennifer Juniper" - Donovan
- "Stoned Soul Picnic" - The Fifth Dimension
- "Take Time to Know Her" - Percy Sledge
- "Time Has Come Today" - The Chambers Bros.
- "Quick Joey Small (Run Joey Run)" - Kasenetz-Katz Singing Orchestral Circus
- "Baby Now That I've Found You" - The Foundations
- "Different Drum" - The Stone Poneys
- "Susie-Q, Part 1" - Creedence Clearwater Revival
- "Journey to the Center of the Mind" - Amboy Dukes
- "Judy In Disguise (With Glasses)"- John Fred & His Playboy Band
- "Reach Out of the Darkness" - Friend & Lover
- "Young Girl" - Gary Puckett & Union Gap
- "Stay In My Corner" - The Dells

==== 1968: Blowin' Your Mind ====
- "Fire" - The Crazy World of Arthur Brown
- "I Can't Stop Dancing" - Archie Bell and The Drells
- "Hey, Western Union Man" - Jerry Butler
- "If I Could Build My Whole World Around You" - Marvin Gaye and Tammi Terrell
- "Son of a Preacher Man" - Dusty Springfield
- "Darlin'" - The Beach Boys
- "The Happy Song (Dum-Dum)" - Otis Redding
- "Soul Serenade" - Willie Mitchell
- "I'm a Midnight Mover" - Wilson Pickett
- "I Put a Spell On You" - Creedence Clearwater Revival
- "In-A-Gadda-Da-Vida" - Iron Butterfly
- "Yummy Yummy Yummy" - Ohio Express
- "I Wonder What She's Doing Tonight" - Tommy Boyce and Bobby Hart
- "Cinnamon" - Derek
- "Stormy" - Classics IV
- "Angel of the Morning" - Merrilee Rush
- "Words" - The Bee Gees
- "Hold Me Tight" - Johnny Nash
- "Simon Says" - 1910 Fruitgum Co.
- "She's a Heartbreaker" - Gene Pitney
- "My Baby Must Be a Magician" - The Marvelettes
- "Here Comes the Judge" - Shorty Long

==== 1969 ====
- "I Want You Back" - The Jackson 5
- "Venus" - Shocking Blue
- "Hot Fun In the Summertime" - Sly & The Family Stone
- "I'm Gonna Make You Love Me" - Diana Ross & The Supremes & The Temptations
- "You Showed Me" - Turtles
- "Oh What a Night" - Dells
- "Get Together" - Youngbloods
- "Build Me Up Buttercup" - Foundations
- "I Can't Get Next to You" - Temptations
- "No Time" - The Guess Who
- "One" - Three Dog Night
- "Time of the Season" - The Zombies
- "Let's Work Together" - Wilbert Harrison
- "Dizzy" - Tommy Roe
- "Soul Deep" - Box Tops
- "What Does It Take (To Win Your Love)" - Junior Walker & The All-Stars
- "Baby Baby Don't Cry" - Smokey Robinson & The Miracles
- "Hawaii Five-O" - The Ventures
- "Crystal Blue Persuasion" - Tommy James & The Shondells
- "Only the Strong Survive" - Jerry Butler
- "Put a Little Love In Your Heart" - Jackie DeShannon
- "Mendicino" - Sir Douglas Quintet
- "Hey There Lonely Girl" - Eddie Holman

==== 1969: The Beat Goes On ====
- "She Came In Through the Bathroom Window" - Joe Cocker
- "Games People Play" - Joe South
- "Take a Letter Maria" - R.B. Greaves
- "Sugar, Sugar" - The Archies
- "Polk Salad Annie" - Tony Joe White
- "My Whole World Ended (The Moment You Left Me)" - David Ruffin
- "I Want to Take You Higher" - Sly & The Family Stone
- "Spinning Wheel" - Blood Sweat & Tears
- "Sweet Cherry Wine" - Tommy James & The Shondells
- "Time Is Tight" - Booker T. & MGs
- "Everybody's Talkin'" - Nilsson
- "In the Year 2525 (Exordium and Terminus)" - Zager and Evans
- "Run Away Child Running Wild" - The Temptations
- "I Got a Line on You" - Spirit
- "Going Up the Country" - Canned Heat
- "Backfield In Motion" - Mel & Tim
- "Israelites" - Desmond Dekker & The Aces
- "Rock Me" - Steppenwolf
- "Too Busy Thinking About My Baby" - Marvin Gaye
- "Jam Up Jelly Tight" - Tommy Roe
- "Can I Change My Mind" - Tyrone Davis
- "Oh Happy Day" - Edwin Hawkins Singers

==== 1969: Shakin' All Over ====
- "Aquarius/Let the Sunshine In" - The Fifth Dimension
- "Eli's Coming" - Three Dog Night
- "My Pledge of Love" - Joe Jeffrey Group
- "These Eyes" - The Guess Who
- "Nothing But a Heartache" - The Flirtations
- "I Started a Joke" - The Bee Gees
- "I'm Gonna Make You Mine" - Lou Christie
- "It's Your Thing" - The Isley Brothers
- "Na Na Hey Hey Kiss Him Goodbye" - Steam
- "Someday We'll Be Together" - Diana Ross & The Supremes
- "Going In Circles" - Friends Of Distinction
- "Commotion" - Creedence Clearwater Revival
- "Twenty-Five Miles" - Edwin Starr
- "The Thrill Is Gone" - B.B. King
- "That's the Way Love Is" - Marvin Gaye
- "Something In the Air" - Thunderclap Newman
- "Crossroads" - Cream
- "Stand" - Sly & The Family Stone
- "Hang 'Em High" - Booker T. & The MG's
- "Worst That Could Happen" - Johnny Maestro & The Brooklyn Bridge
- "Atlantis" - Donovan

==== Rock Renaissance ====
- "Purple Haze" - The Jimi Hendrix Experience
- "Till the End of the Day" - The Kinks
- "All I Really Want To Do" - The Byrds
- "Get Me to the World On Time" - The Electric Prunes
- "Black Magic Woman" - Fleetwood Mac
- "Kentucky Woman" - Deep Purple
- "Whipping Post" - The Allman Brothers Band
- "Sookie Sookie" - Steppenwolf
- "Feelin' Alright" - Joe Cocker
- "Sugar and Spice" - The Cryan Shames
- "Catch the Wind" - Donovan
- "Kick Out the Jams" - MC5
- "Seven & Seven Is" - Love
- "I'm Gonna Love You Too" - The Hullaballoos
- "Ballad of Easy Rider" - The Byrds
- "Paper Sun" - Traffic
- "Homburg" - Procol Harum
- "Hey Joe" - Leaves
- "Money" - The Kingsmen
- "Happenings Ten Years Time Ago" - The Yardbirds
- "I-Feel-Like-I'm-Fixin'-To-Die Rag" - Country Joe & The Fish
- "Combination of the Two" - Big Brother & The Holding Company

==== Rock Renaissance II ====
- 01 - Cream - White Room
- 02 - Seeds - Pushin' Too Hard
- 03 - Byrds - My Back Pages
- 04 - Hollies - Pay You Back With Interest
- 05 - Searchers - Bumblebee
- 06 - Pretty Things - Don't Bring Me Down
- 07 - Troggs - I Can't Control Myself
- 08 - Love - My Little Red Book
- 09 - Kinks - Dedicated Follower of Fashion
- 10 - Santana - Evil Ways
- 11 - Traffic - Forty Thousand Headmen
- 12 - Them - Mystic Eyes
- 13 - Velvet Underground - Sweet Jane
- 14 - Van Morrison - Moondance
- 15 - Flying Burrito Brothers - Christine's Tune
- 16 - Balloon Farm - A Question of Temperature
- 17 - Yardbirds - Stroll On
- 18 - Cream - Tales Of Brave Ulysses
- 19 - Standells - Sometimes Good Guys Don't Wear White
- 20 - Sir Douglas Quintet - The Rains Came
- 21 - Quicksilver Messenger Service - Who Do You Love
- 22 - Blind Faith - Can't Find My Way Home

==== Rock Renaissance III ====
- 01 - Nashville Teens - Tobacco Road
- 02 - Paul Revere & The Raiders - Steppin' Out
- 03 - Searchers - When You Walk In the Room
- 04 - Bobby Fuller Four - Love's Made a Fool of You
- 05 - Troggs - "With a Girl Like You"
- 06 - Barbarians - Are You a Boy Or Are You a Girl
- 07 - Seeds - "Can't Seem to Make You Mine"
- 08 - Sonics - Psycho
- 09 - Byrds - 5 D (Fifth Dimension)
- 10 - Chocolate Watch Band - Let's Talk About Girls
- 11 - Five Americans - I See the Light
- 12 - Nazz - Hello It's Me
- 13 - Procol Harum - A Salty Dog
- 14 - Moody Blues - Ride My See Saw
- 15 - Cream - I Feel Free
- 16 - Joe Cocker - Delta Lady
- 17 - Allman Brothers Band - Midnight Rider
- 18 - Steppenwolf - The Pusher
- 19 - Blood Sweat & Tears - I Can't Quit Her
- 20 - Electric Flag - Groovin' Is Easy
- 21 - Van Morrison - Caravan
- 22 - Blind Faith - Presence of the Lord

==== Rock Renaissance IV ====
- 1 - I’m So Glad - Cream 3:57
- 2 - Alone Again Or - Love 3:14
- 3 - When I Was Young - Eric Burdon and the Animals 2:59
- 4 - Season of the Witch - Donovan 4:55
- 5 - Tuesday Afternoon (Forever Afternoon) - The Moody Blues 4:50
- 6 - Jesus is Just Alright - The Byrds 2:10
- 7 - Open My Eyes - Nazz 2:39
- 8 - Are You Gonna Be There (At the Love In) - The Chocolate Watchband 2:25
- 9 - Blackberry Way - The Move 3:35
- 10 - Flying High - Country Joe and the Fish 2:38
- 11 - Darkness, Darkness - The Youngbloods 3:49
- 12 - Shakin’ Street - MC5 2:21
- 13 - Whiskey Train - Procol Harum 4:30
- 14 - Second Generation Woman - Family 3:15
- 15 - Meet on the Ledge - Fairport Convention 2:51
- 16 - Fresh Air - Quicksilver Messenger 5:20
- 17 - Space Cowboy - The Steve Miller Band 4:57
- 18 - San Francisco Girls (Return of the Native) - Fever Tree 3:57
- 19 - Buy for Me the Rain - The Nitty Gritty Dirt Band 2:24
- 20 - Abba Zaba - Captain Beefheart & the Magic Band 2:42
- 21 - Venus in Furs - The Velvet Underground and Nico 5:06
