= Young and in Love (song) =

Single by Dick and Dee Dee

from the album Young and in Love
- B-side: "Say to Me"
- Released: February 1963 (US); March 1963 (UK)
- Genre: Folk
- Length: 2:16
- Label: Warner Bros.
- Songwriter(s): Dick St. John
- Producer(s): Don Ralke, The Wilder Brothers

Dick and Dee Dee singles chronology
"The River Took My Baby" (1962)	"Young and in Love" (1963)	"Love Is a Once in a Lifetime Thing" (1963)

"Young and in Love" is a song written by Dick St. John and performed by Dick and Dee Dee. It reached #6 on the adult contemporary chart and #17 on the Billboard chart in 1963. The song was also released in the United Kingdom as a single, but it did not chart. The song was featured on their 1963 album, Young and in Love.

The song was produced by Don Ralke and The Wilder Brothers.
