= Dee Dee Phelps =

American singer-songwriter and author

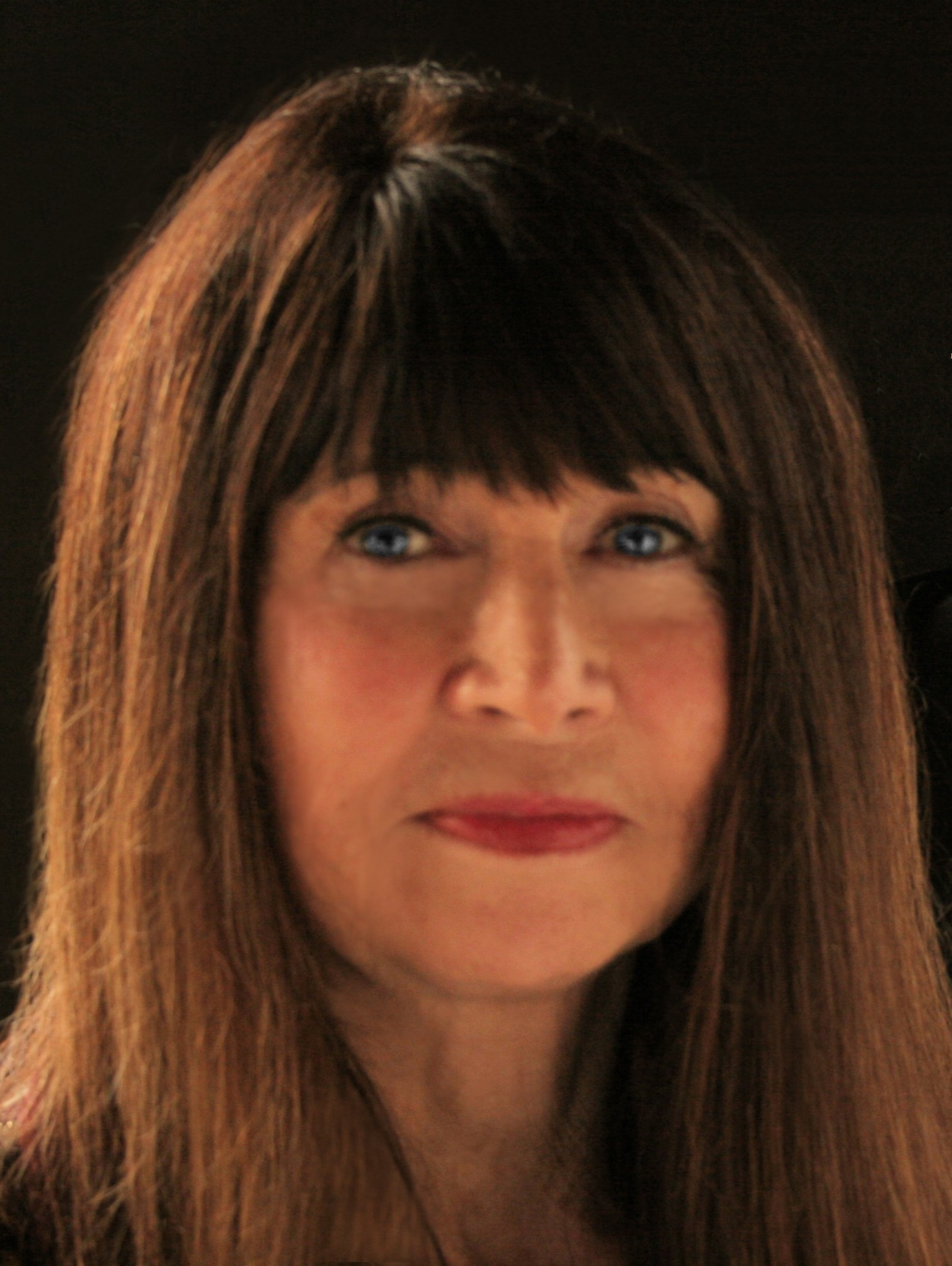
- Phelps in 2008

Background information
- Born: Mary Sperling; Minneapolis, Minnesota, U.S.
- Genres: Pop, R&B
- Occupations: Singer-songwriter, author
- Years active: 1961–1969; 2008–present
- Labels: Warner Bros. Records, Liberty Records, Dot Records
- Website: www.DickandDeeDee.com

Dee Dee Phelps (born Mary Sperling) is a singer-songwriter and author from Santa Monica, California, best known as half the popular 1960s musical duo Dick and Dee Dee. She became a professional writer in 2007, publishing her award-winning memoir Vinyl Highway. In 2008, Dee Dee joined with singer/actor Michael Dunn to revive the Dick and Dee Dee act live. More recently, in 2013, Dee Dee is now teamed with Deke Detanna, lead singer of Deke and the Blazers. The duo performs all over the country, singing classic Dick and Dee Dee hits.

== Early life ==
Phelps was born as Mary Sperling in Minneapolis, Minnesota. When her father was transferred to California, she arrived in Los Angeles by train at the age of eight. After attending University High School in West Los Angeles, she transferred to Santa Monica High. While there, she wrote a regular column for the Santa Monica Evening Outlook, and began singing and writing songs in her senior year.

== Career ==
=== Dick and Dee Dee ===
While attending college and working at a See's Candy store in Westwood, Los Angeles, California, Sperling re-encountered Dick St. John, an old junior high classmate. Both realized they were singer songwriters, and together they began writing songs and harmonizing. The first Dick and Dee Dee 45 RPM release was on Lama Records, a small company started by their record producers, The Wilder Brothers. Without telling her, the record producers changed her name to Dee Dee, something she didn't discover until the record was released. "The Mountain's High" became a smash hit in the Bay Area, eventually becoming number two on the Billboard Top 100 in the United States. Sperling took time off from college so they could tour Texas. The Mountain's High was re-issued on Liberty Records for national distribution.

Sperling and St. John soon garnered other hits in the early 1960s, including "Tell Me", (also on Liberty Records) and "Young and In Love", "Turn Around" (written by Malvina Reynolds and recorded by Harry Belafonte) and "Thou Shalt Not Steal" (on Warner Bros. Records). They toured with the Beach Boys, and were the opening act for the Rolling Stones when the band came to California for the first time in 1964. They later recorded various versions of officially sanctioned Stones songs, largely at the behest of Rolling Stones' manager Andrew Loog Oldham. Their last hit, "Thou Shalt Not Steal" was in 1965. They remained regulars on Jack Good's television show Shindig!.

Dee Dee married the duo's manager (later executive television producer for Dick Clark Productions), Bill Lee, and had one son. Sperling and St. John parted ways in 1969. After her divorce in the early 1970s, Dee Dee married Kane Phelps. They raised two other children and are still married today. Dick performed with his wife, Sandy, in the 1980s as Dick and Dee Dee. He died in 2003.

=== Writing career ===
In 2007, Phelps self-published her memoir, Vinyl Highway, about touring the world with rock and roll acts in the Sixties.

In October 2007, she received the "Best Pop Campaign Award" from the Book Publicists of Southern California for her book promotion. Vinyl Highway also received honorable mention in the Writer's Digest "15th International Book Awards", as well as a "Next Generation Indie Book Awards Finalist" in the memoir category.

=== Later musical career ===
In 2008, Sperling teamed with actor/singer Michael Dunn, and the two are performing as Dick and Dee Dee.

In 2013, Sperling teamed with Deke Detanna of the doo-wop group, Deke and The Blazers.

== Personal life ==
Phelps currently lives with her husband in Pacific Palisades, California. She has three adult children.

== Discography ==
=== Singles ===
Highest Billboard Positions for Dick and Dee Dee
Release	Title	Chart	Rank
1961	"The Mountain's High"	Pop Singles	2
1962	"Tell Me"	Pop Singles	22
1963	"Young and In Love"	Adult Contemporary	6
		Pop Singles	17
1963	"Where Did All The Good Times Go"	Pop Singles	93
1964	"All My Trials"	Pop Singles	89
1964	"Turn Around"	Pop Singles	27
1965	"Be My Baby"	Pop Singles	87
1965	"Thou Shalt Not Steal"	Pop Singles	13

=== TV, Film performances ===
Television

- American Bandstand
- Where the Action Is
- Shindig!
- Ready, Steady, Go (UK)

Motion Picture

- Wild Wild Winter (1966) – Dick and Dee Dee sang "Heartbeats", their only appearance in a film
