= The Mountain's High =

Single by Dick and Dee Dee

from the album Tell Me - The Mountain's High
- A-side: "I Want Someone"
- Released: July 1961 (US Liberty release); September 1961 (UK)
- Genre: Rock and roll
- Length: 2:01
- Label: Lama 7778 (US original release); Liberty 55350 (US); London 9408 (UK)
- Songwriter(s): Dick St. John
- Producer(s): The Wilder Brothers, Don Ralke

Dick and Dee Dee singles chronology
"The Mountain's High" (1961)	"Goodbye to Love" (1961)

"The Mountain's High" is a 1961 hit R&B song written and performed by the California duo Dick and Dee Dee.

== Background ==
The song has unusual special characteristics, being - at least in part - pentatonic. The instrumentation consists of two alternating minor bass-chords, played at the very bottom of the pitch-range of an electric-guitar. The guitar is minor-open-tuned. For most of the song, the two bass-chords are played in descending order, but for the alternative sections, two different bass-chords are played in ascending order.

Each of the two singers (who co-wrote the song) recorded two vocal tracks. It featured Dick St. John Gosting's overdubbed falsetto and Dee Dee Phelps's harmony. Produced by the Wilder Brothers and Don Ralke, it was released as the B-side of "I Want Someone". It was flipped inadvertently by a San Francisco DJ and became an immediate hit with local listeners. Liberty Records of Los Angeles soon signed on the artists for national distribution.

== Chart performance ==
"The Mountain's High" reached the #2 spot in September 1961 on the Billboard Hot 100 and spent two weeks there, held out of #1 by Bobby Vee's "Take Good Care of My Baby", also released by Liberty Records. It also reached #37 on the UK Singles Chart.

Chart (1961)	Peak position
U.K. Singles Chart	37
U.S. Billboard Hot 100	2

== Cover versions ==
- French band "Les Chaussettes Noires" (with lead singer Eddy Mitchell) released a French language version in 1962 titled "Non Ne Lui Dis Pas" (No Don't Tell Him).
