= Hahira, Georgia =

- City
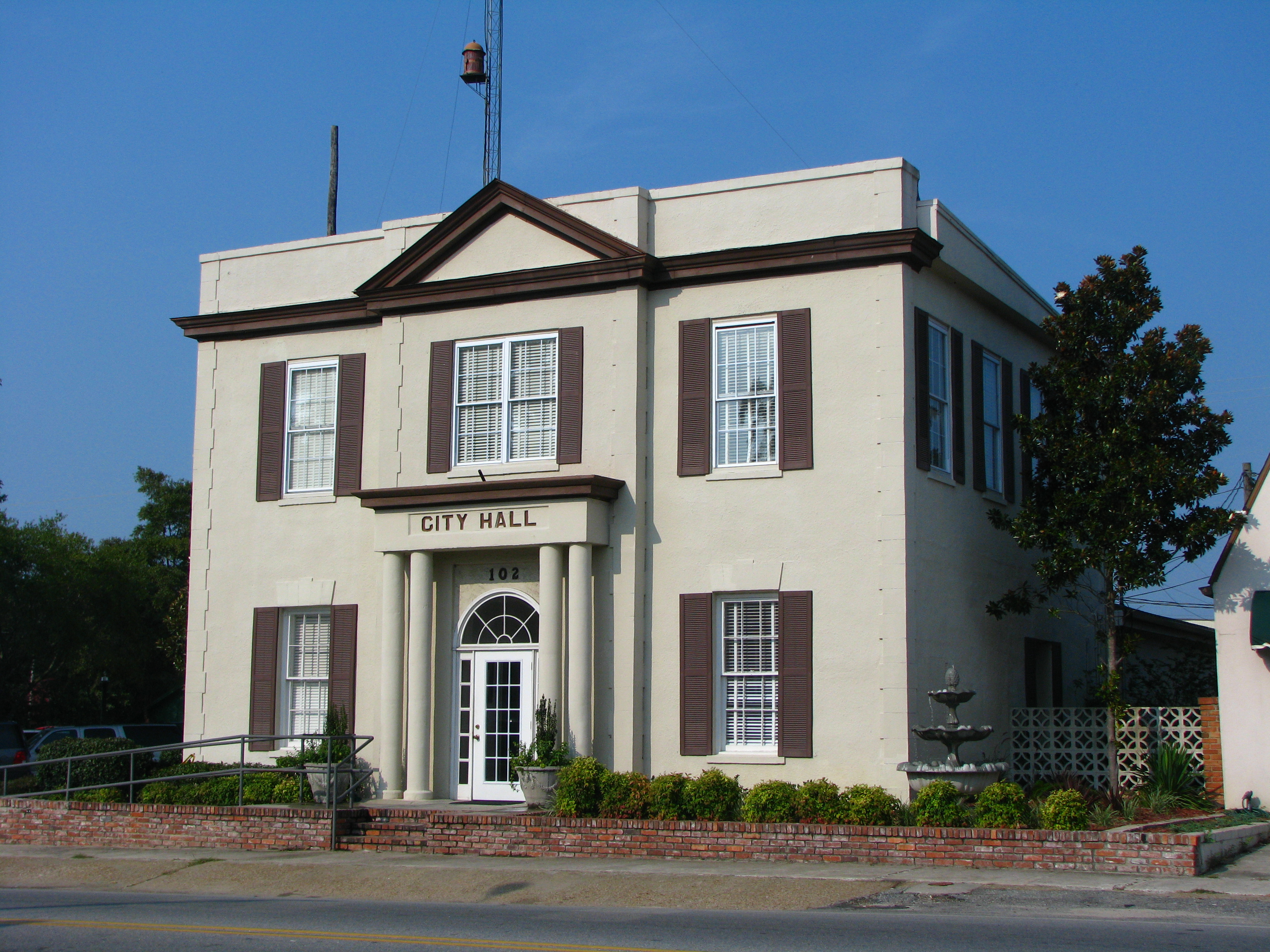
- Hahira City Hall

- Flag Logo

- Location in Lowndes County and the state of Georgia
- Coordinates: 30°59′26″N 83°22′17″W
- Country: United States
- State: Georgia
- County: Lowndes

Area
  - Total: 2.80 sq mi (7.26 km^{2})
  - Land: 2.69 sq mi (6.97 km^{2})
  - Water: 0.11 sq mi (0.29 km^{2})
- Elevation: 226 ft (69 m)

Population (2020)
  - Total: 3,384
  - Density: 1,257.4/sq mi (485.48/km^{2})
- Time zone: UTC-5 (Eastern (EST))
  - Summer (DST): UTC-4 (EDT)
- ZIP code: 31632
- Area code: 229
- FIPS code: 13-36052
- GNIS feature ID: 0315009
- Website: hahiraga.gov

Hahira (/heɪˈhaɪrə/) is a city in northwest Lowndes County, Georgia, United States. The population was 3,384 at the 2020 census, up from 1,626 at the 2000 census.

Hahira has a mayor-council form of elected government. As of 2026, the city is led by Mayor Terry Davis and the four members of the City Council, who are elected from single-member districts.

The city is mentioned in several songs by the American singer and comedian Ray Stevens, most notably in the song "Shriner's Convention."

== History ==
According to legend, the town of Hahira was named after a local cotton plantation. The planter was said to have named his estate after a West African village, Hairaairee, which was described to him by an English traveler. The name may be derived from Pi-HaHiroth, a place mentioned in the Hebrew Bible. According to a local legend, the name originated with a locomotive engineer called Hira, who was hailed by friends with, "Hey, Hira."

The Georgia General Assembly incorporated Hahira in 1891, with Henry Briggs Lawson serving as the first mayor until 1907. By the time of its incorporation, several stores had already been established due to an influx of residents in the mid-1880s. In 1904, a bank was opened, followed by a newspaper in 1906. Prior to 1904, there was one practicing doctor in the town during the 1890s.

As a predominantly agricultural area, Hahira residents largely relied on their own vegetable gardens, raised hogs for meat, and owned milk cows. The primary cash crop was cotton, which remained so until the early 1920s when a Boll weevil infestation devastated the crop. Subsequently, tobacco became the main source of income for farmers despite traditionally only been grown in Virginia and North Carolina.

In the late 1920s, a group of tobacco businessmen in Hahira established a cigarette manufacturing facility instead of shipping their products to the northern U.S. Their cigarette packs featured a Native American man on the front and a wigwam on the back. However, during the Great Depression, the cigarette manufacturers sold their shares in the company to the Julep Cigarette Company. Hahira then became the manufacturing site for nationally distributed "Happy Days" cigarettes for several years. The cigarette factory was situated alongside the Norfolk Southern Railroad on Coleman Road and remained in operation until 1998. In 2002, the building was demolished, and many of its old bricks, as well as heart pine lumber from its foundation beams and flooring, were salvaged for reuse.

Additionally, timber and its by-products played a significant role in the local economy, with woodlands abundant in large yellow pine or heart pine trees. In the late 1920s and early 1930s, Hahira also gained prominence in the boxing scene through local fight promotions.

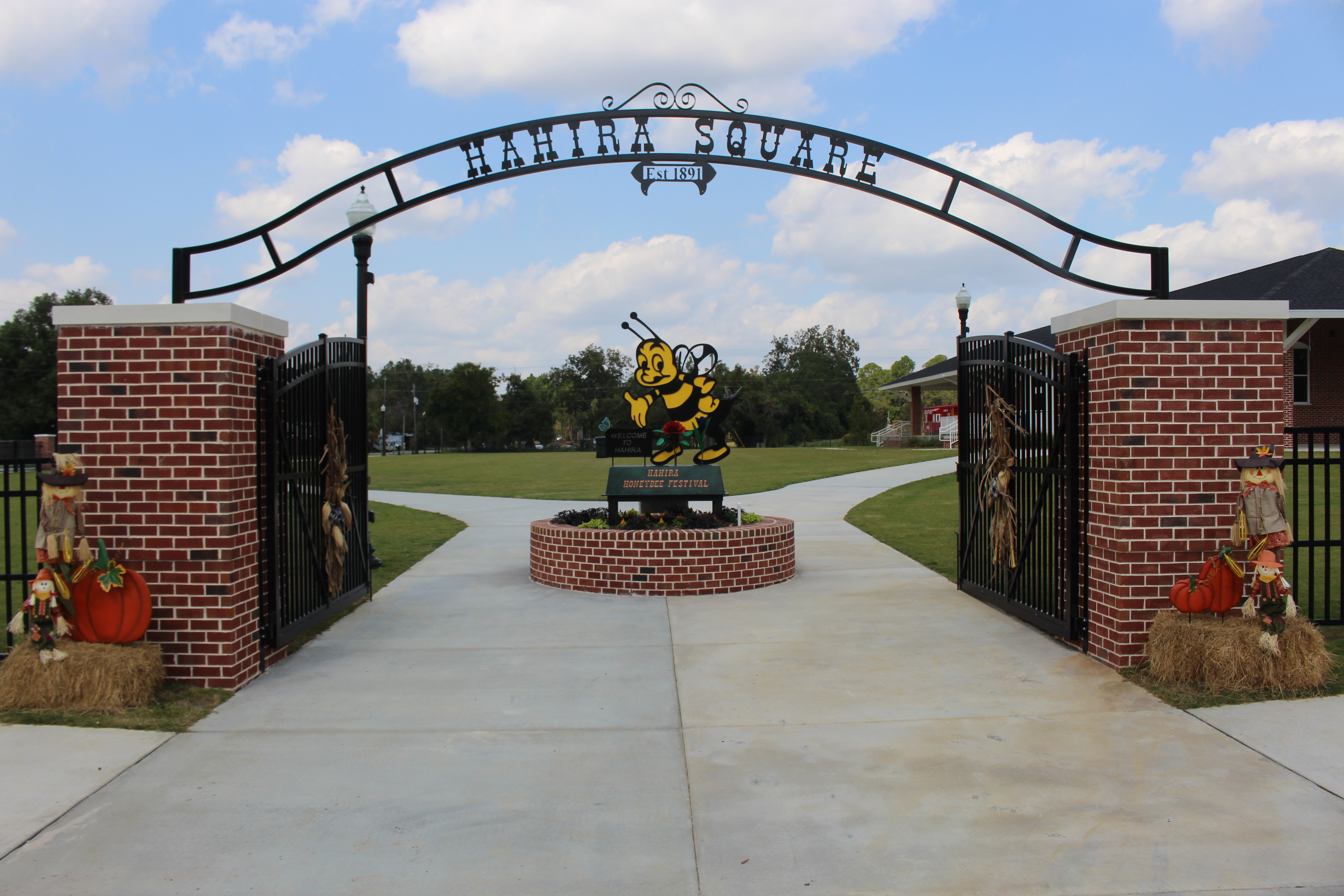
Hahira Square entrance

This period also marked the growth of the beekeeping industry in the area. When settlers first arrived in South Georgia, there were no honeybees to pollinate their crops. Beekeeping was introduced by W. L. Morgan in Troupville. The black bee was brought from Germany or Holland, while the yellow bee originated from Italy. J. E. Williams established an apiary in the region that is now Cook County, near Sparks, Georgia, and became the first recorded commercial beekeeper in Lowndes County. The Puett Co. and Garnett Puett Sr. are recognized as pioneers in the Hahira beekeeping industry.

Hahira has largely remained an agricultural community, with tobacco cultivation continuing as one of its main crops, though production has fallen significantly since its peak in the 20th century.

== Geography ==
Hahira is located at 30°59′26″N 83°22′17″W (30.990537, -83.371433). U.S. Route 41 passes through the center of town as Church Street, leading north 4 miles (6 km) to Cecil and south 14 miles (23 km) to Valdosta, the county seat. Interstate 75 passes through the west side of Hahira, with access from Exit 29 (Georgia State Route 122). I-75 leads north 33 miles (53 km) to Tifton and south past Valdosta 74 miles (119 km) to Lake City, Florida. State Route 122 is Hahira's Main Street and leads east 18 miles (29 km) to Lakeland and west 22 miles (35 km) to Pavo.

According to the United States Census Bureau, Hahira has a total area of 2.80 square miles (7.26 km^{2}), of which 2.69 square miles (6.97 km^{2}) are land and 0.11 square miles (0.29 km^{2}), or 4.00%, are water. Franks Creek runs through the westernmost part of the city and is part of the Little River–Withlachoochee River–Suwannee River watershed, flowing to the Gulf of Mexico.

== Demographics ==
Historical population
Census	Pop.	Note	%±
1900	365		—
1910	346		−5.2%
1920	401		15.9%
1930	420		4.7%
1940	537		27.9%
1950	1,010		88.1%
1960	1,297		28.4%
1970	1,363		5.1%
1980	1,534		12.5%
1990	1,353		−11.8%
2000	1,626		20.2%
2010	2,737		68.3%
2020	3,384		23.6%
U.S. Decennial Census; 1850-1870 1870-1880; 1890-1910 1920-1930; 1940 1950 1960; 1970 1980 1990; 2000 2010

=== 2020 census ===
As of the 2020 census, Hahira had a population of 3,384. The median age was 31.9 years. 30.6% of residents were under the age of 18 and 12.2% of residents were 65 years of age or older. For every 100 females there were 83.8 males, and for every 100 females age 18 and over there were 76.0 males age 18 and over.

0.0% of residents lived in urban areas, while 100.0% lived in rural areas.

There were 1,294 households in Hahira, of which 42.0% had children under the age of 18 living in them. Of all households, 41.0% were married-couple households, 15.9% were households with a male householder and no spouse or partner present, and 38.0% were households with a female householder and no spouse or partner present. About 27.1% of all households were made up of individuals and 13.0% had someone living alone who was 65 years of age or older.

There were 1,382 housing units, of which 6.4% were vacant. The homeowner vacancy rate was 2.0% and the rental vacancy rate was 4.7%.

Racial composition as of the 2020 census
Race	Number	Percent
White	2,237	66.1%
Black or African American	837	24.7%
American Indian and Alaska Native	19	0.6%
Asian	36	1.1%
Native Hawaiian and Other Pacific Islander	5	0.1%
Some other race	87	2.6%
Two or more races	163	4.8%
Hispanic or Latino (of any race)	171	5.1%

=== 2000 census ===
In 2000, there were 1,626 people, 643 households, and 448 families residing in the city. The population density was 739.4 inhabitants per square mile (285.5/km^{2}). There were 715 housing units at an average density of 325.1 units per square mile (125.5 units/km^{2}). The racial makeup of the city was 73.49% White, 22.32% African American, 0.92% Native American, 0.31% Asian, 1.97% from other races, and 0.98% from two or more races. Hispanic or Latino of any race were 4.43% of the population.

There were 643 households, out of which 37.9% had children under the age of 18 living with them, 46.5% were married couples living together, 18.7% had a female householder with no husband present, and 30.3% were non-families. 27.7% of all households were made up of individuals, and 15.1% had someone living alone who was 65 years of age or older. The average household size was 2.50 and the average family size was 3.08.

In the city, the population was spread out, with 29.4% under the age of 18, 8.1% from 18 to 24, 30.4% from 25 to 44, 18.4% from 45 to 64, and 13.8% who were 65 years of age or older. The median age was 32 years. For every 100 females, there were 83.5 males. For every 100 females age 18 and over, there were 80.8 males.

The median income for a household in the city was $27,946, and the median income for a family was $37,188. Males had a median income of $27,121 versus $18,981 for females. The per capita income for the city was $12,899. About 13.9% of families and 17.6% of the population were below the poverty line, including 23.1% of those under age 18 and 19.6% of those age 65 or over.

== Education ==
Students in Hahira are part of the Lowndes County School District. The following schools are in Hahira:

- Hahira Elementary School
- Hahira Middle School

The South Georgia Regional Library operates the Walter R. & Dorothy Salter Hahira Library. For years, the public library of Hahira consisted of a few thousand books in a small room in City Hall open only on Thursday afternoons. The state of Georgia then launched a grant program to its cities, promising funds that would pay 90 percent of construction and furnishings to local governments that matched funds and provided land. Hahira citizens were divided, torn between serious water and sewage issues and their own public library. Ultimately, Hahira, which was known during the 1920s as the Queen Bee Capital of the World, built a library, which opened on March 12, 1989.

The library acquired its name from Walter R. Salter, a former mayor, councilman, and local business owner who had long desired a library for the community. Upon his death in 1984, his wife Dorothy came forward with a gift of $30,000. Dorothy was present at the library's formal dedication and Clara Vinson was named as its first manager. Salter Hahira Library is widely used by educators and home school families in the community. It serves as a community center for Hahira, and a touchstone for local storytelling. In 2010, the library received an $80,000 renovation, completed by Cauthan Construction Company, of the exterior and interior.

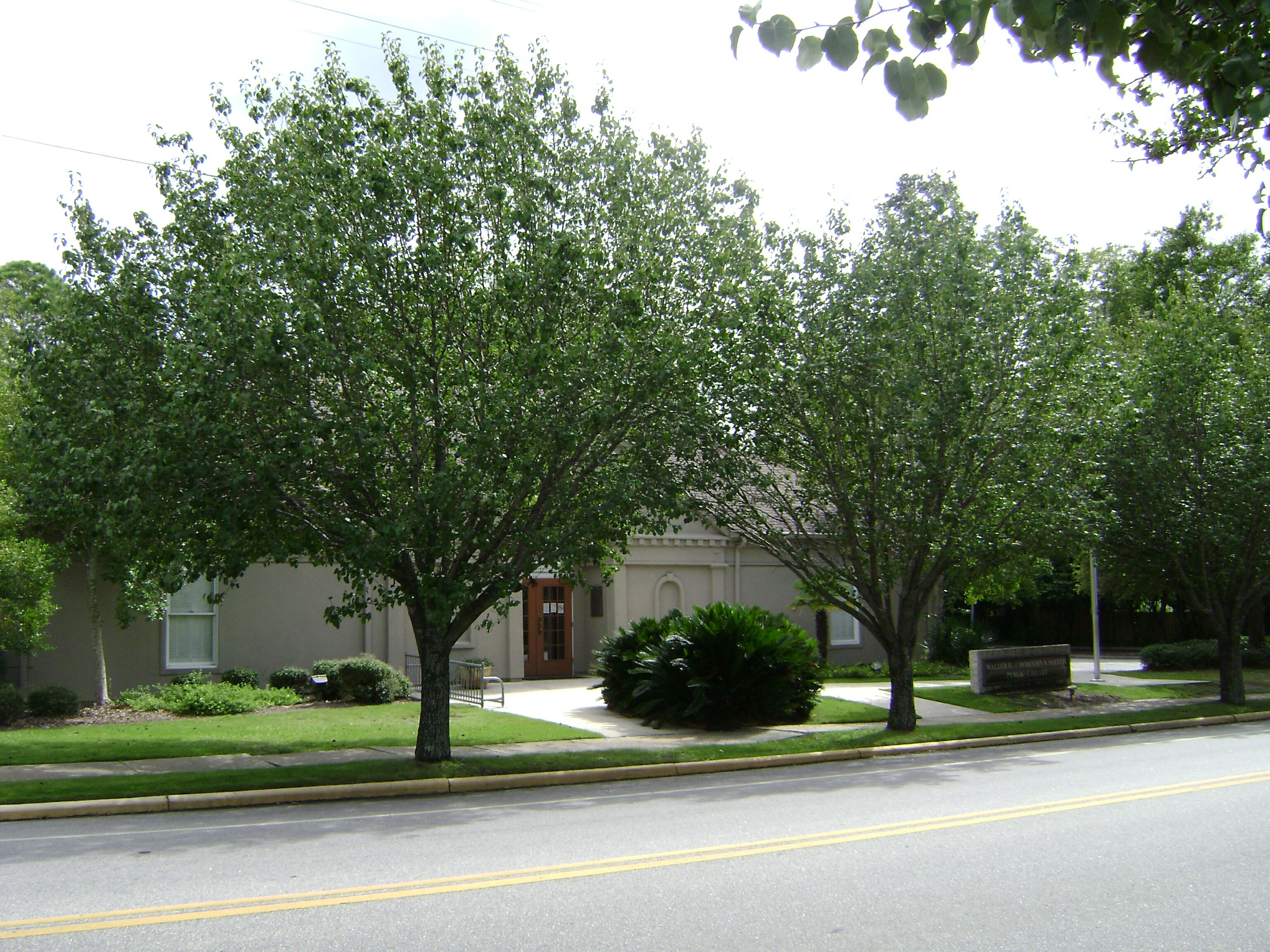
Walter R. & Dorothy Salter Hahira Library

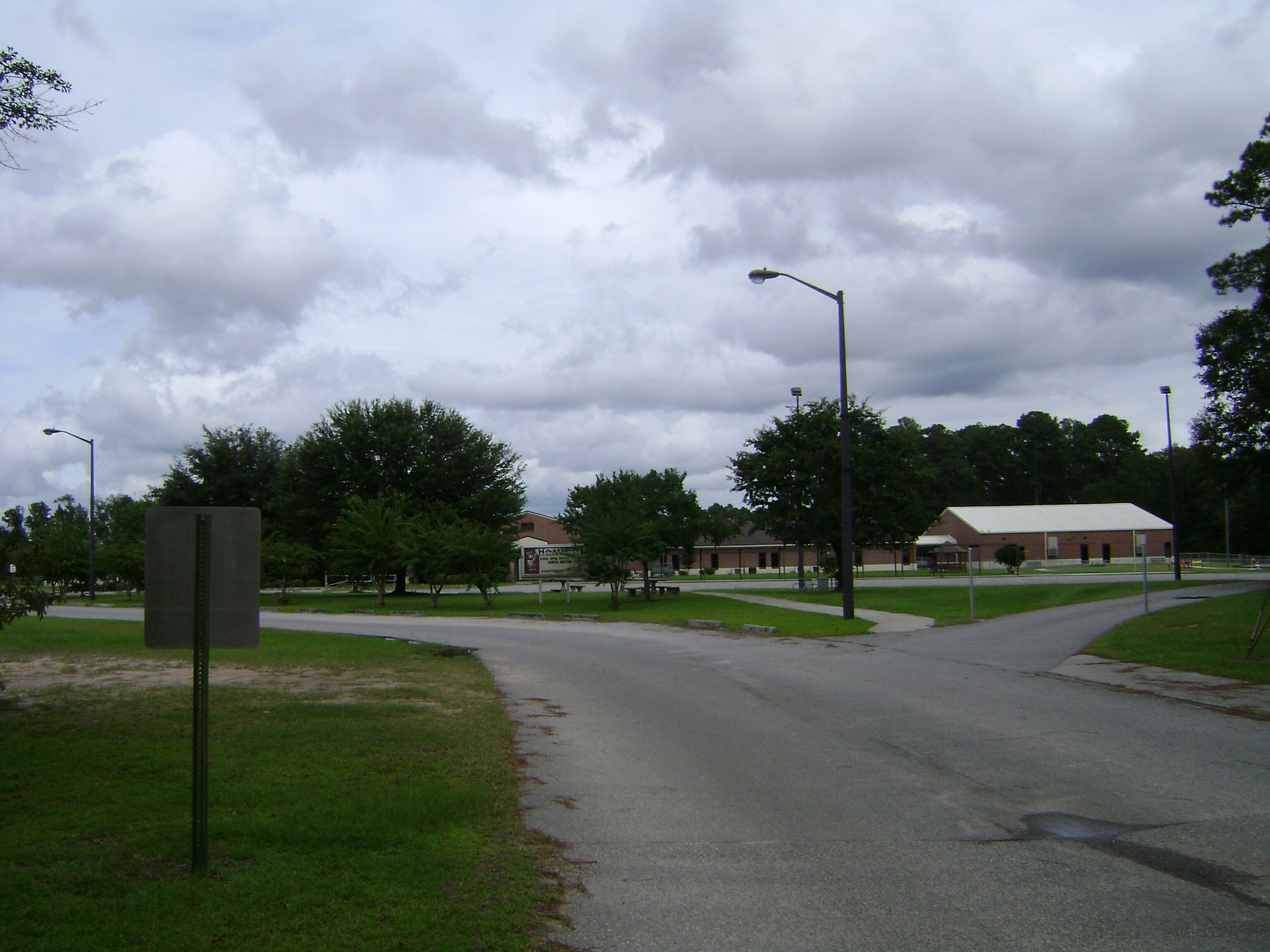
Hahira Elementary School

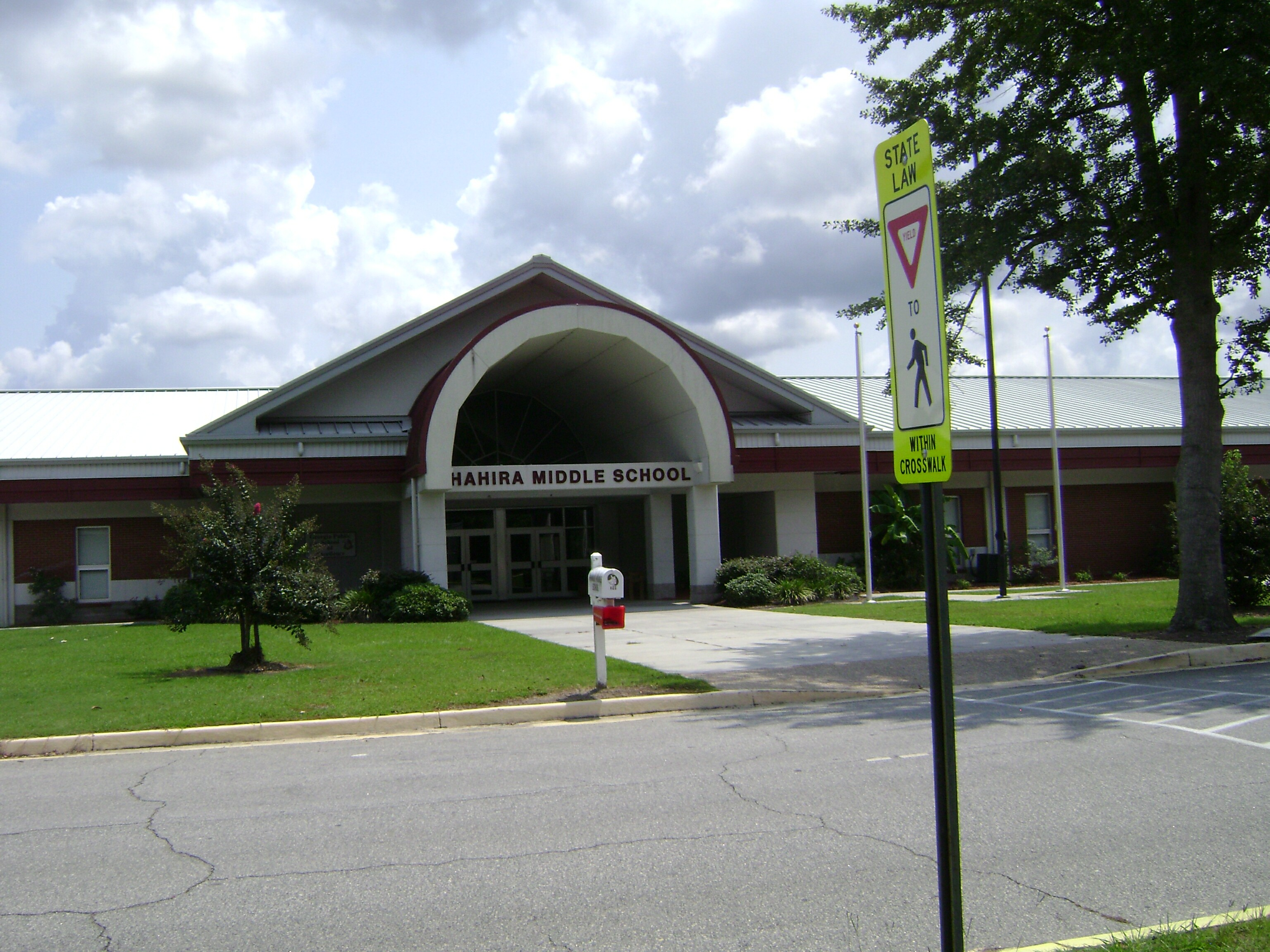
Hahira Middle School

== Clothing ordinance ==
Citing public safety concerns, in March 2008, the Hahira City Council, with a vote by the mayor, passed a clothing ordinance that bans residents from wearing pants that have a top falling below the waist in fit and reveal skin or undergarments. The council was split 2–2, and their tie was broken by the mayor in favor of the ordinance.

== Notable people ==
- Stephen Drew, J. D. Drew, and Tim Drew, brothers and Major League Baseball players
- Althea Garrison, former city councilor in Boston, Massachusetts
- Jerry Manuel, Major League Baseball manager
- Mark and Dean Mathis, singers in the pop trio, The Newbeats, known for the song "Bread and Butter"
- Gabe Nabers, National Football League football player
- Lizz Wright, jazz singer and composer

== Hahira Honey Bee Festival ==
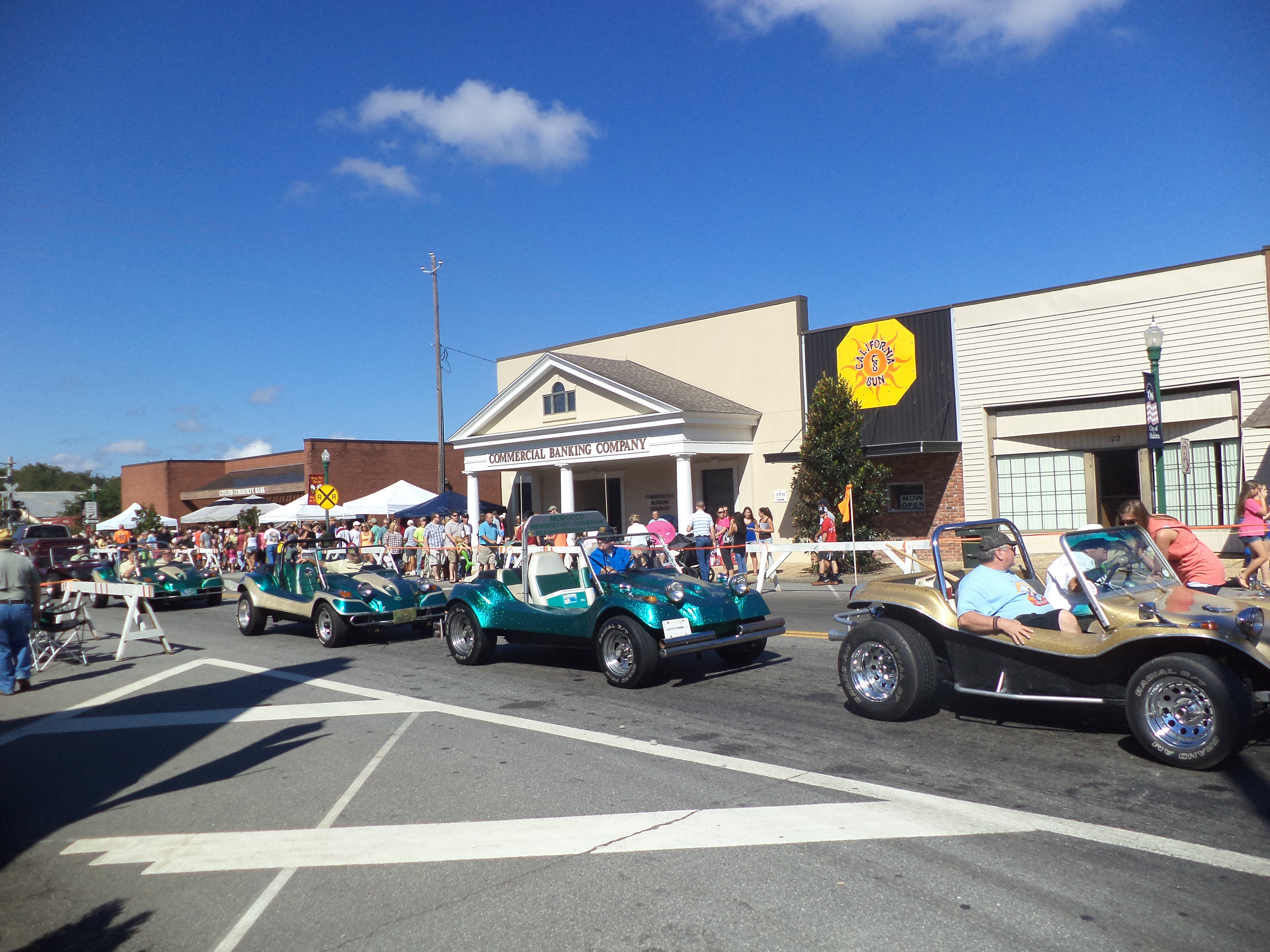
Hahira Honeybee Festival

The Hahira Honeybee Festival is an annual event held in the city during the first week of October. Established in 1981 by Mamie Sorrell and Adeline Landrum, its aim was to revitalize Hahira through an event including arts, crafts, food, entertainment, a beauty pageant, and a parade. Since its inception, the festival has grown from a single weekend into a week-long event. It has become one of the largest festivals of its kind in South Georgia. Attendance estimates for the parade and the festival's street activities include as many as 36,000 visitors, making it a significant attraction for the town.

Often, the festival has an annual theme. For example, in 2022, the theme was "Living a Life Without Limits: Honoring Those With Special Abilities in Our Community," and the theme for 2023 honored lineworkers. In 2024, the festival will honor school bus drivers.

In October 2022, Georgia Governor Brian Kemp became the first governor to serve as grand marshal in the festival's parade.

== Great Hahira Pick-In ==
From the early 1980s to the mid-1990s, Wilby and Gloria Coleman of Valdosta, together with family and friends, sponsored an annual bluegrass festival in Hahira. The Pick-In featured a weekend of bluegrass bands on the mountain stage as well as pickers and grinners in camp sites throughout the city. Citing falling revenues, organizers ended the Pick-Ins in the mid-1990s. In the Fall of 2009, Harvey's Supermarket sponsored a "Great Hahira Pick-In," before building a store on the traditional site of the festival.
