= Everything's Alright =

Everything's Alright may refer to:

- Everything's Alright (album), a 1997 album by Charlie Major
- "Everything's Alright" (The Newbeats song), 1964
- "Everything's Alright" (The Mojos song), 1964
- "Everything's Alright" (Jesus Christ Superstar song), 1971
- Everything's Alright (film), a 1978 Brazilian comedy film

== See also ==
- "Everything Is Alright", a 2005 song by Motion City Soundtrack
