= It Takes All Kinds of People =

It Takes All Kinds of People may refer to:

- song by Meatloaf from the 1971 album Stoney & Meatloaf
- song from the 1972 album Roy Orbison Sings
- song from the 1975 album Who I Am (David Ruffin album)

== See also ==
- It Takes All Kinds (disambiguation)
