= Turn Around (Dick and Dee Dee song) =

Single by Dick and Dee Dee

from the album Turn Around
- B-side: "Don't Leave Me"
- Released: November 1963 (US); November 13, 1963 (UK)
- Genre: Folk
- Length: 2:38
- Label: Warner Bros.
- Songwriters: Malvina Reynolds, Alan Greene, Harry Belafonte
- Producers: Don Ralke, The Wilder Brothers

Dick and Dee Dee singles chronology
"Where Did the Good Times Go" (1963)	"Turn Around" (1963)	"All My Trials" (1964)

"Turn Around" is a song written by Malvina Reynolds, Alan Greene, and Harry Belafonte and made popular by Dick and Dee Dee. The song was produced by Don Ralke and The Wilder Brothers.

== Chart performance ==
It reached number 15 on the adult contemporary chart and number 27 on the Billboard chart in 1963. In Canada it reached number 23. The song was also released in the United Kingdom as a single, but it did not chart. The song was featured on their 1964 album, Turn Around.

== Other versions ==
- Belafonte released a version of the song as the B-side of his 1959 single, "Darlin' Cora".
- The Kingston Trio released a version on the 1963 album, Time to Think.
- Josh White Jr. released a version on the 1964 album, I'm On My Own Way.
- The Brothers Four released a version of the song as the B-side of their 1965 single, "Somewhere".
- The Womenfolk released a version as a single in the UK in 1965.
- Freddie and the Dreamers released a version as a single in the UK in 1966.
- Eddie Albert released a version of the song as the B-side of his 1966 single, "Green Acres".
- Sonny & Cher released a version of the song as the B-side of their 1966 single, "Living for You".
- Nadia Cattouse released a version of the song as the B-side of her 1966 single, "Beautiful Barbados".
- Anita Harris released a version of the song on her 1967 album Just Loving You.
- Jimmie Rodgers released a version of the song on his 1967 album, Child of Clay.
- Diana Ross released a version of the song on her 1973 album, Last Time I Saw Him.
- Václav Neckář released a version with czech lyrics on his 1974 album Tomu, Kdo Nás Má Rád.
- Nanci Griffith released a version of the song on her 1993 album Other Voices, Other Rooms.
- Rosemary Clooney released a version of the song on her 1997 album, Mothers & Daughters.
- Kenny Loggins released a version of the song on his 2000 album, More Songs from Pooh Corner.
- Homer Simpson sings "Turn Around" in the 2003 Simpsons episode "The Ziff Who Came to Dinner".
