= Thou shalt not steal (disambiguation) =

"Thou shalt not steal" is one of the Ten Commandments of the Jewish Torah / or Christian first five Old Testament of the Bible

Thou shalt not steal or Thou Shalt Not Steal may also refer to:

- Thou Shalt Not Steal (film), a 1917 American silent film
- "Thou Shalt Not Steal" (song), a 1964 song performed by Dick and Dee Dee
- Thou Shalt Not Steal (TV series), a 2024 Australian TV series directed by Dylan River
