= Bread & Butter (album) =

Studio album by The Newbeats
- Released: 1964
- Genre: Pop rock
- Length: 26:20
- Label: Hickory 120

The Newbeats chronology
Bread & Butter (1964)	Big Beat Sounds by The Newbeats (1965)

Singles from Bread & Butter
- 1. "Bread and Butter"/"Tough Little Buggy" Released: July 1964; 2. "Everything's Alright"/"Pink Dally Rue" Released: October 1964; 3. "So Fine"/"Top Secret" Released: 1967; 4. "Thou Shalt Not Steal"/"Great Balls of Fire" Released: June 1969

Professional ratings
Review scores
Source	Rating
Allmusic	2/5 stars
Record Mirror	5/5 stars

Bread & Butter is the debut album by The Newbeats and was released in 1964. It reached #56 on the Billboard 200.

Four singles were released from the album with three of the singles charting in the United States: "Bread and Butter" reached #2, "Everything's Alright" reached #16, and "Thou Shalt Not Steal" reached #128.

== Track listing ==
1. "Bread and Butter" – 1:58 (Larry Parks/Jay Turnbow)
2. "Bye Bye Love" – 2:53 (Felice and Boudleaux Bryant)
3. "The Shoop Shoop Song (It's in His Kiss)" – 2:05 (Rudy Clark)
4. "There Oughta Be a Law (Bout the Stuff I Saw)" – 2:20 (Louis "Dean" Mathias/Marcus F. Mathis/Tress Redmon)
5. "So Fine" – 2:25 (Johnny Otis)
6. "Pink Dally Rue" – 1:57 (Don Gant/Norris Wilson)
7. "Everything's Alright" – 2:10 (John D. Loudermilk)
8. "A Patent on Love" – 2:03 (Larry Henley)
9. "I'm Blue (The Gong Gong Song)" – 2:17 (Ike Turner)
10. "Tough Little Buggy" – 2:23 (Dave Allen)
11. "Thou Shalt Not Steal" – 1:59 (Loudermilk)
12. "Ain't That Lovin' You Baby" – 1:50 (Jimmy Reed)

== Charts ==
Chart (1964)	Peak position
Billboard Top LPs	56

Singles

Year	Single	Chart	Position
1964	"Bread and Butter"	Billboard Hot 100	2
1964	"Bread and Butter"	UK Singles Chart	15
1964	"Bread and Butter"	Australia	8
1964	"Bread and Butter"	Canada	1
1964	"Everything's Alright"	Billboard Hot 100	16
1964	"Everything's Alright"	Australia	53
1964	"Everything's Alright"	Canada	6
1969	"Thou Shalt Not Steal"	Billboard Hot 100	128
