= It Takes All Kinds =

It Takes All Kinds may refer to:

- It Takes All Kinds (film), 1969 film
- It Takes All Kinds, series 1 episode 3 of All Creatures Great and Small, see List of All Creatures Great and Small episodes
- It Takes All Kinds, series 5 episode 1 of The Liver Birds
- It Takes All Kinds, 1986 poetry collection by Raymond Souster
- It Takes All Kinds, song by Sly and the Family Stone from the 1979 album Back on the Right Track
- It Takes All Kinds, song from the album Bachelor No. 2 or, the Last Remains of the Dodo by Aimee Mann

== See also ==
- It Takes All Kinds of People (disambiguation)
