= Memphis (Roy Orbison album) =

- Cover art by Drew Struzan

Studio album by Roy Orbison
- Released: November 1972
- Genre: Rockabilly
- Length: 37:27
- Label: MGM (SE 4867)
- Producer: Roy Orbison, Joe Melson

Roy Orbison chronology
Roy Orbison Sings (1972)	Memphis (1972)	Milestones (1973)

Singles from Memphis
- 1. "Memphis, Tennessee" Released: September 18, 1972

Memphis is the seventeenth album recorded by Roy Orbison, and his tenth for MGM Records. The album was released in November 1972.

The album was released on compact disc by Diablo Records on October 25, 2004, as one of three albums combined on one CD with Roy Orbison Sings and Milestones being the other two. Memphis was included in a box set entitled The MGM Years 1965-1973 - Roy Orbison, which contains 12 of his MGM studio albums, 1 compilation, and was released on December 4, 2015.

== History ==
The album took three weeks to make in March and April 1972. The album had one single, "Memphis, Tennessee", which reached No. 84 in the US. Also included was a new, re-recorded version of Don Gibson's "I Can't Stop Loving You", which previously appeared on his 1960 album Lonely and Blue. This was Orbison's final album that was released for London Records as Decca let Orbison out of their contract on June 30, 1972.

== Reception ==
Professional ratings
Review scores
Source	Rating
AllMusic	3/5 stars
The Encyclopedia of Popular Music	2/5 stars

Bruce Eder of AllMusic said that the album "moves on to more familiar sentimental country-pop territory of the kind that Glen Campbell had been charting with and filling his albums with for a few years -- and after that comes a hot, beat-driven, chorus-laden, big-sounding number. nderstated interpretation of Don Gibson's "I Can't Stop Loving You" that shows how less can be more with a voice like Orbison's, and then there's the pop/rock country "Run the Engines Up High," which incorporates some heavy, rock-style fuzz guitar, and a version of "I Fought the Law," complete with phased drums."

Billboard described the album as "one of [Orbison] best efforts in years"

== Track listing ==
Side one

1. "Memphis, Tennessee" – (Chuck Berry)
2. "Why A Woman Cries" – (Jerry McBee)
3. "Run, Baby Run (Back Into My Arms)" – (Joe Melson, Don Gant)
4. "Take Care of Your Woman" – (Jerry McBee)
5. "I'm The Man on Susie's Mind" – (Joe Melson, Glenn Barber)
6. "I Can't Stop Loving You" – (Don Gibson)

Side two

1. "Run The Engines Up High" – (Jerry McBee)
2. "It Ain't No Big Thing (But It's Growing)" – (Neal Merritt, Alice Joy Merritt, Shorty Hall)
3. "I Fought the Law" – (Sonny Curtis)
4. "The Three Bells" – (Jean Villard; English lyrics by Bert Reisfeld)
5. "Danny Boy" – (Frederic Weatherly)

== Production ==
- Produced by Joe Melson & Roy Orbison except "Danny Boy" produced by Don Gant
- Arranged by Joe Tanner
