= Break Away (from That Boy) =

Single by The Newbeats

from the album Big Beat Sounds by The Newbeats
- B-side: "Hey-O-Daddy-O"
- Released: January 1965 (US); February 1965 (UK)
- Genre: Pop rock
- Length: 2:25
- Label: Hickory 1290
- Songwriters: Louis "Dean" Mathis, Marcus F. Mathis
- Producer: Wesley Rose

The Newbeats singles chronology
"Everything's Alright" (1964)	"Break Away (from That Boy)" (1965)	"(The Bees Are for the Birds) The Birds Are for the Bees" (1965)

"Break Away (from That Boy)" is a song written by Louis "Dean" Mathis and Marcus F. Mathis and performed by The Newbeats. It reached #7 in Australia, #15 in Canada, and #40 on the Billboard Hot 100 in 1965. The song was also released in the United Kingdom as a single, but it did not chart. The song was featured on their 1965 album, Big Beat Sounds by The Newbeats.

The song was produced by Wesley Rose. The single's B-side, "Hey-O-Daddy-O", reached #118 on the US Billboard chart.

The song was re-released in 1970 as the B-side to the group's single, "Laura (What's He Got That I Ain't Got)".
