= Ain't That Lovin' You, Baby (Jimmy Reed song) =

"Ain't That Lovin' You"
- "Ain't That Lovin' You" single

Single by Jimmy Reed
- B-side: Baby, Don't Say That No More
- Released: February 1956
- Recorded: December 5, 1955
- Venue: Chicago, Illinois, United States
- Genre: Blues
- Length: 2:20
- Label: Vee-Jay (no.168)
- Songwriter: Jimmy Reed

Jimmy Reed singles chronology
"I Don't Go for That" (1955)	"Ain't That Lovin' You" (1956)	"Can't Stand to See You Go" (1956)

"Ain't That Lovin' You, Baby" is an upbeat blues song, written and recorded by Jimmy Reed. The single reached number eight in the US Billboard R&B chart in late March 1956. Backing Reed (guitar, harmonica, and vocal) are Eddie Taylor (guitar), Vernel Fournier (drums), and an unknown guitarist.

"Ain't That Lovin' You Baby" has been recorded by a variety of artists, including the Newbeats on the debut album Bread & Butter, Link Wray, Dale Hawkins, Ronnie Hawkins, the Everly Brothers on Gone, Gone, Gone, Etta James on Etta James Rocks the House, Eric Clapton on Blues, Steve Miller on Living in the 20th Century, The Beau Brummels on their 1965 debut album, Introducing The Beau Brummels, and the Youngbloods on their debut album, The Youngbloods.
