= Simon Birch =

American comedy-drama film

- Theatrical release poster
- Directed by: Mark Steven Johnson
- Screenplay by: Mark Steven Johnson
- Based on: A Prayer for Owen Meany by John Irving
- Produced by: Roger Birnbaum; Laurence Mark
- Starring: Joseph Mazzello; Oliver Platt; David Strathairn; Ian Michael Smith; Dana Ivey; Ashley Judd; Jim Carrey
- Cinematography: Aaron Schneider
- Edited by: David Finfer
- Music by: Marc Shaiman
- Production companies: Hollywood Pictures; Caravan Pictures; Roger Birnbaum Productions; Laurence Mark Productions
- Distributed by: Buena Vista Pictures Distribution
- Release date: September 11, 1998
- Running time: 114 minutes
- Country: United States
- Language: English
- Budget: $20 million
- Box office: $18.3 million

Simon Birch is a 1998 American comedy-drama film written and directed by Mark Steven Johnson in his directorial debut, loosely based on the 1989 novel A Prayer for Owen Meany by John Irving. The film stars Ian Michael Smith in his only acting role, Joseph Mazzello, Jim Carrey, Ashley Judd, and Oliver Platt. It omitted much of the latter half of the novel and altered the ending.

The film does not share the book's title at Irving's request; he did not believe that his novel could successfully be made into a film. The name "Simon Birch" was suggested by him to replace that of Owen Meany. The opening credits of the film state that it was "suggested by" Irving's novel. The main plot centers on 12-year-old Joe Wenteworth and his best friend Simon Birch, who was born with dwarfism. Simon Birch was released by Buena Vista Pictures Distribution on September 11, 1998. The film received mixed reviews from critics and was a box office failure that grossed just $18.3 million against a budget of $20 million.

== Plot ==
An adult Joe Wenteworth visits the grave of his late friend, Simon Birch. He narrates over as the film transitions to their childhood in 1964. Simon is the smallest child in the history of Gravestown. His callous parents show little to no concern for his wellbeing. He loves baseball even though he almost never gets to play during Little League, and when he does, it's only to get a walk due to his abnormally small strike zone and his inability to run. Rebecca, Joe's mother who is the belle of the town, fell pregnant with Joe after meeting a man on a train. Her refusal to reveal the identity of the father has resulted in Joe's reputation as the town's love child. She was also seen as a mother-figure to Simon as his parents were very distant of him.

One day, Rebecca invites drama teacher Ben Goodrich over for dinner. He meets the boys and gifts Joe a stuffed armadillo. Simon takes an instant liking to Ben, but Joe is initially standoffish, as he just wants to find his birth father. Rebecca invites Ben with them to church one Sunday morning. During church announcements, Simon expresses his beliefs to Reverend Russell that church activities are irrelevant to glorifying God. Sunday school teacher Miss Leavey sits him in a corner until he apologizes. She berates him, saying he doesn't belong in church. Outraged upon hearing this, Rebecca argues with Leavey as she comes to pick up Simon, calling out her insecurities towards Simon's abundant faith.

During a baseball game, Simon hits the perfect pitch. It becomes a foul ball that hits Rebecca in the head, killing her. A remorseful Simon gives Joe his prized baseball cards as an apology, to which Joe gives Simon the stuffed armadillo as forgiveness. Joe's grandmother informs Joe that her own death is imminent due to her age, and there must be a plan for him once her time comes, as Rebecca never told anyone who Joe's father was, even in confidence. Simon believes that Joe's father may have taken the baseball that killed Rebecca. Deeming their gym teacher a fitting candidate, they break into his office to see if he has it, but it isn't there. Overwhelmed with despair, Joe vandalizes the office. The police chief agrees to release them if they volunteer at the children's retreat over winter break. After they agree on the arrangement, he doesn't know whom to call to pick them up, since Simon's parents chose to let him spend the night there as a lesson. Simon has the idea to ask Ben. He then picks them up, forgives them, and takes them for ice cream. Simon tells Ben of his destiny to be a hero but admits that he doesn't know what that will imply. However, he fears it could happen momentarily, and might miss it.

A Christmas pageant with a Nativity play is organized by Leavey. Simon, being forced to play the Baby Jesus, criticizes Leavey's poor creative decisions, resulting in Russell confiscating Simon's baseball cards until the pageant is over. The play proves disastrous as the turtle dove costumes look like winged mutant turtles, the youth group in the pageant sing a mock version of "Joy to the World" while the choir sings, the wise men cannot remember "We Three Kings", and Howard's acrophobia causes him to forget his lines. It soon escalates to violent chaos when Simon, incited by seeing Marjorie's cleavage, makes a move on her. Howard's harness breaks due to his weight, swinging him back and forth repeatedly, eventually vomiting on Leavey. As punishment for the sexual assault and ruining the pageant, Russell suspends Simon from the church, expels him from the winter retreat, and refuses him the return of his baseball cards. Simon admits he wants to know God's purpose for him. While looking for Simon at his home, Joe berates his parents for their lack of care for him. As the church departs for the retreat, Simon comes by the church to say goodbye to Joe. Later on, he breaks into Russell's office to retrieve his cards, where he discovers the fateful baseball, implicating Russell as Joe's father. Simon has Ben drive him to the retreat to inform Joe, arriving just as Russell has already told him.

While Simon and Joe are riding the bus home, the driver swerves to miss a deer and it crashes into a lake. With the driver abandoning the bus and Russell unconscious, Simon takes command and gets everyone out with Joe's help, but nearly drowns while saving the last child and passes out from hypothermia. Later, Joe wakes up in the hospital and goes to visit Simon, who was dying from Cold shock response. He sees Marjorie call Simon brave and kiss him, before leaving and letting Joe talk to him. Simon wakes up upon hearing him, remarking how his small size worked to his advantage in evacuating the kids. Simon requested that Joe holds on to his baseball cards and bid him farewell as he passes away, in which Joe mourned him. Joe's grandmother passes away that summer and he is adopted by Ben just before his 13th birthday. Back in the present day with adult Joe at Simon's grave, Joe's son, named after Simon, reminds him that he has a soccer game, and they drive away as the film ends.

== Cast ==
- Ian Michael Smith as Simon Birch, a very small preteen who was considered the smallest child in Gravestown
- Joseph Mazzello as Joe Wenteworth, Simon's best friend
  - Jim Carrey as Adult Joe Wenteworth
- Ashley Judd as Rebecca Wenteworth, Joe's mother who was the Belle of Gravestown
- Oliver Platt as Ben Goodrich, a school teacher who later became Joe's adoptive father
- David Strathairn as Reverend Russell, a church pastor who was Joe's biological father
- Dana Ivey as Grandmother Wenteworth, Joe's grandmother
- Jan Hooks as Miss Agnes Leavey, an irate Sunday School teacher
- Beatrice Winde as Hilde Grove
- Cecilley Carroll as Marjorie, a young lady who Simon was sweet for
- Sumela-Rose Keramidopulos as Ann
- Sam Morton as Stuart
- John Mazzello as Simon Wenteworth, Joe's son
- Holly Dennison as Mrs. Birch, Simon's mother
- Peter MacNeill as Mr. Birch, Simon's father
- Thomas J. Burns as Simon Birch Stunt Double

== Production ==
=== Casting ===
The role of Simon Birch was Ian Michael Smith's first and only role in film, and he has not done film acting since. Smith was chosen because of his small height, due to Morquio syndrome. A hospital worker in Chicago suggested Smith try out for a role in the film The Mighty, another film that called for a character with Morquio syndrome. When Smith didn't get the part, the director of The Mighty recommended Smith to Mark Steven Johnson whom he knew was searching for an actor to play the titular role in an Owen Meany adaptation. After Smith's parents read through the novel A Prayer for Owen Meany they agreed to let him work on the film.

Sandra Bullock was originally cast in the role of Rebecca Wenteworth.

=== Locations ===
The bus crash scene was filmed near Ontario's French River. The film's quarry scenes were shot at Elora, Ontario. The church featured in many parts of the film is in Lunenburg, Nova Scotia. Its black borders were painted white for the film. At the end of the film when it switches to the future, the borders are black. The baseball scene as well as many indoor scenes were filmed in Glen Williams, Ontario.

== Soundtrack ==
Simon Birch features R&B songs from the 1950s and 1960s, as well as four score cues by Marc Shaiman. The film's original motion picture soundtrack was released on compact disc, LP and audio cassette on April 24, 1998, through Sony Wonder, Hollywood Records and Epic Records featuring the following songs:

1. "You Were There" – Babyface
2. "Bread and Butter" – The Newbeats
3. "A Walkin' Miracle" – The Essex
4. "Mickey's Monkey" – Smokey Robinson / The Miracles
5. "Can I Get a Witness" – Marvin Gaye
6. "Fever" – Peggy Lee
7. "Up on the Roof" – The Drifters
8. "Papa's Got a Brand New Bag" – James Brown
9. "The Nitty Gritty" – Shirley Ellis
10. "Nowhere to Run" – Martha and the Vandellas
11. "It's All Right" – The Impressions
12. "(Your Love Keeps Lifting Me) Higher and Higher" – Jackie Wilson
13. "Simon's Theme" – Marc Shaiman
14. "Friends Forever" – Marc Shaiman
15. "Simon's Birth" – Marc Shaiman
16. "Life Goes On" – Marc Shaiman

== Reception ==
On the review aggregator website Rotten Tomatoes, 44% of 32 critics' reviews are positive, with an average rating of 5.8/10. The website's consensus reads: "Overly mushy; tries too hard to pull at the heart-strings." On Metacritic, the film has a 39/100 rating, indicating "generally unfavorable reviews". Movie critic Gene Siskel rated it the 7th best movie of 1998. Audiences polled by CinemaScore gave the film an average grade of "A" on an A+ to F scale.

The film opened at #5 at the North American box office making $3,321,370 in its opening weekend. The film would go on to gross $18,253,415 domestically, against a $20 million budget.

== Home media ==
The film was released on VHS, LaserDisc and DVD on May 18, 1999.
