= Dick and Dee Dee =

Musical duo

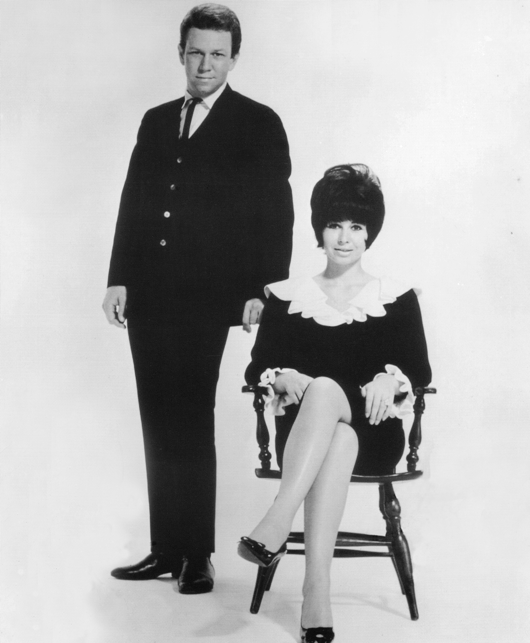
- Dick and Dee Dee publicity photo, mid-1960s

Background information
- Origin: United States
- Genres: Pop, R&B, rock and roll, Folk
- Occupation: Singing duo
- Years active: 1960–1969
- Labels: Warner Bros. Records, Liberty Records, Dot Records
- Past members: Dick St. John (deceased); Dee Dee Sperling
- Website: www.DickandDeeDee.com

Dick and Dee Dee (or Dick and Deedee) are an American singer-songwriter duo who reached popularity in the early to mid-1960s. The group was founded by California classmates Richard Gosting and Mary Sperling. They eventually changed their names to Dick St. John and Dee Dee Sperling (currently Dee Dee Phelps). They had their first hit in 1961 when "The Mountain's High" reached No. 2 on the Billboard 100. They toured with the Beach Boys and opened for the Rolling Stones during the Stones's 1964 tour of California. Regulars on the show Shindig!, the duo had multiple hit songs before St. John and Sperling disbanded in 1969. In the 1980s, St. John toured with his wife, Sandy. Dick St. John died on December 27, 2003, after a fall at his home. Dee Dee Phelps began performing with actor/singer Michael Dunn as Dick and Dee Dee in 2008, appearing in large doo wop and rock and roll shows throughout the United States.

== History ==
=== Founding ===
Dick St. John and Dee Dee Sperling met while students at Paul Revere Junior High School in Los Angeles, California. They attended different high schools, only to re-encounter one another after graduation. At the time Sperling was attending college and working at a See's Candy store, and St. John was looking for a job. They realized they were singer-songwriters, and together they began writing songs and singing the vocal parts. The duo were not romantically linked.

=== The Mountain's High ===
The first Dick and Dee Dee 45 rpm release ("I Want Someone" backed by "The Mountain's High") was on Lama Records, a small company started by their record producers, the Wilder brothers and Don Ralke. Their recordings were created with four voice tracks. Each of them sang two separate harmony lines. St. John sang the highest and lowest parts including the falsetto, and Dee Dee sang the middle notes. Without telling the duo, the record producers changed Mary's name to Dee Dee, something the duo did not discover until after the record was released.

The rock and roll song "The Mountain's High" became a smash hit in San Francisco. The single was leased to Liberty Records for national distribution and spent two weeks at No. 2 on the Billboard Hot 100. The track reached No. 37 in the UK Singles Chart, and eventually sold over a million copies. Sperling left college to perform with St. John on rock and roll tours in America, Europe, and Japan.

=== Touring with the Beach Boys, Rolling Stones ===
In the United States early on in their career, Dick and Dee Dee performed at California high school assemblies with the upcoming surf band the Beach Boys. They eventually sang in 49 of the 50 states, with acts like Roy Orbison, the Righteous Brothers, Ike and Tina Turner, Dionne Warwick, the Shirelles, The Dick Clark Caravan of Stars, Murray the K’s Brooklyn Paramount Theatre review, Paul Revere and the Raiders, the Kingsmen, Patti La Belle, the Crystals, the Drifters, Ben E. King, Jan and Dean, the Miracles, the Dovells, Johnny Tillotson, Jackie Wilson, and Sonny and Cher.

Dick and Dee Dee were the opening act for the Rolling Stones when the band came to California for their first tour in 1964. The duo recorded their voices on three Rolling Stones tracks while visiting London in 1964, including "Blue Turns to Grey", and "Some Things Just Stick in Your Mind", penned by Mick Jagger and Keith Richards. In an interview with BBC Radio recorded in 2006, Dee Dee Phelps revealed that their singing was overdubbed onto backing tracks recorded by the Rolling Stones with Mick Jagger's vocals removed. The songs were officially sanctioned, largely at the behest of Rolling Stones manager Andrew Loog Oldham, and released on Warner Bros. Records.

=== Later singles ===
The duo had eight other singles chart with a total of five reaching the Top 30. Their other hits included "Tell Me" (1962), "Young and in Love" (1963), "Turn Around" in 1964 (written by Malvina Reynolds and recorded by Harry Belafonte), and "Thou Shalt Not Steal" (their second-biggest hit, reaching No. 13 in 1965, which included a special picture sleeve issue promoting Triumph Motorcycles). They also performed the song "Bupkiss" (which was also the title of the episode) on The Dick Van Dyke Show. After their last hit "Thou Shalt Not Steal", they remained regulars on Jack Good's television show Shindig!.

=== Disbanding, revivals ===
In 1965, Dee Dee married the duo's manager (later executive television producer for Dick Clark Productions), Bill Lee, and had one son. In 1969, St. John and Sperling parted ways. Dick St. John continued as a songwriter, co-writing "Yellow Balloon" for the group of the same name. After her divorce in the early seventies, Dee Dee married Kane Phelps and moved to Big Sur for the remainder of that decade. They raised two other children, moving back to the Los Angeles area in the 1980s, and are still married as of 2011.

In the 1980s, St. John revived the Dick and Dee Dee act with his wife, Sandy. The two of them also authored a cookbook in 1993, The Rock and Roll Cookbook, which featured recipes of various rock and roll artists. St. John died on December 27, 2003, after a fall from the roof of his house, at the age of 63.

Dick & Dee Dee are name-checked several times (as rumored to be re-uniting) in the 1980 movie One-Trick Pony, written by, and starring, Paul Simon.

=== Dick and Dee Dee today ===
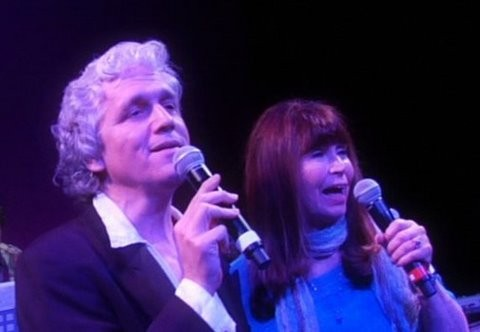
Michael Dunn and Dee Dee Phelps performing in 2011

In 2006, Dee Dee Phelps published Vinyl Highway, Singing as Dick and Dee Dee in the Sixties, and in 2008 she teamed with actor and singer Michael Dunn to again revive the classic Dick and Dee Dee songs on stage.

Dunn was trained at the Juilliard School and had a lengthy theatrical career in his native Chicago. He is also a lyricist, partnering with producer/composer Jim Price for several years in Nashville. He sang the John Lennon lead vocals on Dan Castellaneta’s Beatles tribute, Two Lips: The Lost Album, in 1998. For over a decade he has performed a one-man show as Charles Dickens for Los Angeles audiences.

== Discography ==
=== Albums ===
Year	Album	Record label
1962	Tell Me – The Mountain's High	Liberty Records
1963	Young and in Love	Warner Bros. Records
1964	Turn Around	Warner Bros. Records
1965	Thou Shalt Not Steal	Warner Bros. Records
1966	Songs We've Sung on Shindig	Warner Bros. Records
1995	The Best of Dick and Dee Dee	Varèse Vintage

=== Singles ===
Year	Title	Peak chart positions				Record Label	B-side	Album
Year	Title	US	AC	CAN (CHUM RPM)	UK	Record Label	B-side	Album
1961	"The Mountain's High"	2	–	–	37	Liberty Records	"I Want Someone"	Tell Me – The Mountain's High
1961	"Goodbye to Love"	–	–	–	–	Liberty Records	"Swing Low"	Tell Me – The Mountain's High
1962	"Tell Me"	22	–	–	–	Liberty Records	"Will You Always Love Me"	Tell Me – The Mountain's High
1962	"Life's Just a Play"	–	–	–	–	Liberty Records	"All I Want"	
1962	"The River Took My Baby"	–	–	–	–	Liberty Records	"My Lonely Self"	
1963	"Young and in Love"	17	6	–	–	Warner Bros. Records	"Say to Me"	Young and in Love
1963	"Love Is a Once in a Lifetime Thing"	103	–	–	–	Warner Bros. Records	"Chug-A-Chug-A Choo Choo"	Young and in Love
1963	"Where Did the Good Times Go"	93	–	–	–	Warner Bros. Records	"Guess Our Love Must Show"	Thou Shalt Not Steal
1963	"Turn Around"	27	15	23	–	Warner Bros. Records	"Don't Leave Me"	Turn Around
1964	"All My Trials"	89	–	–	–	Warner Bros. Records	"Don't Think Twice, It's All Right"	Turn Around
1964	"Not Fade Away"	–	–	–	–	Warner Bros. Records	"The Gift"	Thou Shalt Not Steal
1964	"Remember When"	–	–	–	–	Warner Bros. Records	"You Were Mine"	Thou Shalt Not Steal
1964	"Thou Shalt Not Steal"	13	–	17	–	Warner Bros. Records	"Just 'Round the River Bend"	Thou Shalt Not Steal
1965	"Be My Baby"	87	–	38	–	Warner Bros. Records	"Room 404"	Thou Shalt Not Steal
1965	"When Blue Turns to Grey"	–	–	–	–	Warner Bros. Records	"Some Things Just Stick in Your Mind"	
1965	"Use What You've Got"	–	–	–	–	Warner Bros. Records	"New Orleans"	
1966	"Till"	–	–	–	–	Warner Bros. Records	"Sha-La"	
1966	"So Many Things We Don't Know"	–	–	–	–	Warner Bros. Records	"She Didn't Even Say Goodbye"	
1966	"Make Up Before We Break Up"	–	–	–	–	Warner Bros. Records	"Can't Get Enough of Your Love"	
1967	"I'll Always Be Around"	–	–	–	–	Warner Bros. Records	"Long Lonely Nights"	
1967	"One in a Million"	–	–	–	–	Warner Bros. Records	"Baby, I Need You"	
1968	"The Escape Suite"	–	–	–	–	Dot Records	"I'm Not Gonna Get Hung-Up About It"	
1969	"In the Season of Our Love"	–	–	–	–	Dot Records	"We'll Sing in the Sunshine"	
1969	"Do I Love You"	–	–	–	–	Dot Records	"You Come Back to Haunt Me"	

=== TV, film performances ===
Television

- American Bandstand
- Where the Action Is
- Shindig!
- Ready, Steady, Go (UK)

Motion Picture

- Wild Wild Winter (1966) – sang "Heartbeats", their only film appearance
