= Milestones (Roy Orbison album) =

Studio album by Roy Orbison
- Released: September 24, 1973
- Genre: Rock
- Length: 35:35
- Label: MGM (SE 4934)
- Producer: Roy Orbison, Joe Melson

Roy Orbison chronology
Memphis (1972)	Milestones (1973)	I'm Still in Love with You (1975)

Singles from Milestones
- 1. "Blue Rain (Coming Down)" Released: May 30, 1973; 2. "I Wanna Live" Released: September 23, 1973

Professional ratings
Review scores
Source	Rating
AllMusic	3/5 stars
The Encyclopedia of Popular Music	2/5 stars

Milestones is the eighteenth album by Roy Orbison, released on September 24, 1973, by MGM Records—his last album for that label. It was arranged by Joe Tanner, Rex North and Randy Goodrum. It features cover versions of contemporary pop hits. Orbison's version of Maureen McGovern's song "The Morning After" was featured in the film The Poseidon Adventure.

The album was released on compact disc in 2004 combined with two other albums: Roy Orbison Sings and Memphis. The album was also included in a box set titled The MGM Years 1965–1973 – Roy Orbison from 2015.

== Reception ==
Bruce Eder of AllMusic wrote that the album "included a lot of excellent covers, among them 'Sweet Caroline', 'I've Been Loving You Too Long (To Stop Now)', 'Drift Away', and the Bee Gees' 'Words'."

Billboard wrote that Orbison's "sweetly individualistic voice works well with the Mike Curb policy of contemporary MOR packaging of long-time stars."

== Track listing ==
=== Side one ===
1. "I Wanna Live" (John D. Loudermilk)
2. "You Don't Know Me" (Cindy Walker, Eddy Arnold)
3. "California Sunshine Girl" (Letha Purdom)
4. "Words" (Barry Gibb, Robin Gibb, Maurice Gibb)
5. "Blue Rain (Coming Down)" (Roy Orbison, Joe Melson)
6. "Drift Away" (Mentor Williams)

=== Side two ===
1. "You Lay So Easy on My Mind" (Donald L. Riis, Bobby G. Rice, Charles W. Fields)
2. "The World You Live In" (Joe Melson, Suzie Melson)
3. "Sweet Caroline" (Neil Diamond)
4. "I've Been Loving You Too Long (To Stop Now)" (Otis Redding, Jerry Butler)
5. "The Morning After" (Al Kasha, Joel Hirschhorn)
