= Ian Michael Smith =

American actor (born 1987)

- Born: May 5, 1987 (age 39); Elmhurst, Illinois, U.S.
- Occupations: Actor, software engineer
- Height: 3 ft 1 in (0.94 m)

Ian Michael Smith (born May 5, 1987) is an American software engineer and former child actor, known for his sole starring role in Simon Birch.

His short physical stature (3 ft 1 in (0.94 m)) is a result of Morquio syndrome, a rare enzymatic disorder affecting the circulatory, muscular and skeletal systems.

== Life and work ==
Smith was born in Elmhurst, Illinois. A Chicago-area hospital worker approached his parents about him auditioning for the leading role in The Mighty, a feature film about a character with Morquio Syndrome. Kieran Culkin was cast instead, but Smith was recommended for the title role of Simon Birch (1998), a film based loosely on John Irving's novel A Prayer for Owen Meany, which also called for a small child actor. This was Smith’s sole acting role.

After acting, he graduated from York Community High School in Elmhurst in 2005. He has undergone several operations including a spinal fusion and two bilateral osteotomies. He graduated from the Massachusetts Institute of Technology in 2009, and Gallaudet University in 2012 and now works as a software engineer. He is a co-founder of a nonprofit organization, Project Alloy, that gives assistance to underrepresented people in tech fields. In 2019, he joined a class action lawsuit against the City of Oakland for excluding people with disabilities from the city’s rent control program.
