= Roy Orbison Sings =

Studio album by Roy Orbison
- Released: May 1972
- Genre: Rock and roll
- Length: 25:26
- Label: MGM
- Producer: Mike Curb; Wesley Rose; Don Gant

Roy Orbison chronology
The All-Time Greatest Hits of Roy Orbison (1972)	Roy Orbison Sings (1972)	Memphis (1972)

Singles from Roy Orbison Sings
- 1. "God Love You" Released: February 1, 1972; 2. "Remember The Good" Released: June 1972

Roy Orbison Sings is the sixteenth album recorded by Roy Orbison and the ninth for MGM Records, released in May 1972. Around this time, Orbison's hit singles had well and truly dried up, but this album is said to be one of his finest.

The album was released on compact disc by Diablo Records on October 25, 2004, as one of three albums combined on one CD along with Memphis and Milestones from 1973. Roy Orbison Sings was included in a box set entitled The MGM Years 1965-1973 - Roy Orbison, which contains 12 of his MGM studio albums, 1 compilation, and was released on December 4, 2015.

== History ==
The album was recorded during various sessions, starting in August 1969, then at various times during 1970 and 1971. Around this time Orbison's former composer Joe Melson returned to Orbison after Melson was writing songs on his own.

== Reception ==
Professional ratings
Review scores
Source	Rating
AllMusic	2.5/5 stars
The Encyclopedia of Popular Music	2/5 stars

Bruce Eder of AllMusic described the album as an "amazingly consistent album" and noted Orbison's vocals are at their "strongest and most confident, whether on romantic ballads such as 'God Love You" or "Rings of Gold", or on slightly more country-flavored numbers like 'Plain Jane Country (Come to Town)'.

As a "Special Merit Pick", Billboard Magazine believed Orbison remained "in fine voice" while the production on the track "Rings of Gold" was a "triumph".

With production coming from multiple individuals for the album, Record Mirror thought the finished product brought "a fair variety of background ideas to enhance the clarity of Roy's voice with 'If Only For Awhile' as a particularly strong track for that soaring, emotional style."

== Track listing ==
=== Side one ===
1. "God Love You" (Roy Orbison, Joe Melson) (Arr: Joe Tanner)
2. "Beaujolais" (John Carter, Tim Gilbert)
3. "If Only for a While" (Bill Dees, Larry Henley) (Arr: Jim Hall)
4. "Rings of Gold" (Gene Thomas) (Arr: Joe Tanner)
5. "Help Me" (Orbison, Melson) (Arr: Jim Hall)
6. "Plain Jane Country (Come to Town)" (Eddy Raven)

=== Side two ===
1. "Harlem Woman" (Orbison, Melson) (Arr: Bergen White)
2. "Cheyenne" (Carter, Gilbert)
3. "Changes" (Orbison, Melson) (Arr: Joe Tanner)
4. "It Takes All Kinds of People" (Orbison, Mike Curb) (Arr: Don Peake)
5. "Remember the Good" (Mickey Newbury) (Arr: Joe Tanner)

Side one:
Tracks 1, 5 produced by Joe Melson and Roy Orbison
Track 2 produced by Don Gant
Tracks 3, 4, 6 produced by Wesley Rose

Side two:
Tracks 1, 3 produced by Joe Melson and Roy Orbison
Track 2 produced by Don Gant
Track 4 produced by Mike Curb
Track 5 produced by Wesley Rose

== European track listing ==
=== Side one ===
1. "Changes"
2. "Harlem Woman"
3. "Cheyenne"
4. "Yesterday's Child" (originally appeared on Roy Orbison's Many Moods) (Roy Orbison, Bill Dees)
5. "It Takes All Kinds of People"
6. "Beaujolais"

=== Side two ===
1. "God Love You"
2. "If Only for a While"
3. "Help Me"
4. "Plain Jane Country (Come to Town)"
5. "Rings of Gold"
6. "Remember the Good"

Released on London Records
