= Everything's Alright (The Newbeats song) =

Single by The Newbeats

from the album Bread & Butter
- B-side: "Pink Dally Rue"
- Released: August 1964 (CAN); October 1964 (US); November 1964 (UK)
- Genre: Beat; pop rock
- Length: 2:10
- Label: Hickory 1269
- Songwriter(s): John D. Loudermilk

The Newbeats singles chronology
"Bread and Butter" (1964)	"Everything's Alright" (1964)	"Break Away (from That Boy)" (1965)

"Everything's Alright" is a song written by John D. Loudermilk and performed by The Newbeats. It reached #6 in Canada, #16 on the Billboard Hot 100, and #53 in Australia in 1964. The song was also released in the United Kingdom as a single, but it did not chart. The song was featured on their 1964 album, Bread & Butter.

The song was re-released as the B-side to the group's 1972 single, "Love Gets Sweeter".
