= Bread and Butter (song) =

Single by the Newbeats

from the album Bread & Butter
- B-side: "Tough Little Buggy"
- Released: July 1964 (US); 28 August 1964 (UK)
- Recorded: 1964
- Genre: Pop rock
- Length: 1:58
- Label: Hickory 1269
- Songwriters: Larry Parks; Jay Turnbow

The Newbeats singles chronology
"Bread and Butter" (1964)	"Everything's Alright" (1964)

"Bread and Butter" is a 1964 song by American pop vocal trio the Newbeats. Written by Larry Parks and Jay Turnbow, "Bread and Butter" was the group's first and most popular hit, reaching No. 2 on the US Billboard Hot 100.

== Background ==
"Bread and Butter" served as the Newbeats' demo in an effort to obtain a recording contract with Hickory Records. They were then asked to formally record the track for the label.

The opening two-chord piano riff and the lead falsetto singing voice of Larry Henley are notable features of the song.

== Use in other media ==
The song was sampled in the Dickie Goodman novelty tune "Presidential Interview (Flying Saucer '64)". "Bread and Butter" was the inspiration for the advertising jingle of Schmidt Baking Company used in the 1970s and 1980s; it went: "I like bread and butter, I like toast and jam, I like Schmidt's Blue Ribbon Bread, It's my favorite brand". Devo covered the song in 1986 for the soundtrack to the film 9½ Weeks. A lyrically modified version was used as the theme for the television series Baby Talk.

The song features on the soundtrack to the 1998 comedy-drama film, Simon Birch, as well as in the 2004 Will Ferrell comedy, Anchorman: The Legend of Ron Burgundy. "Bread and Butter" also was featured in The Brave Little Toaster Goes to Mars and in the Lizzie McGuire episode "She Said, He Said, She Said". The song has also been used as a jingle for Savacentre, Spam, Doritos, Little Chef and Quaker Rice Cakes; as well as in a 2018 television commercial for Walmart.

== Chart performance and run ==
- Billboard Hot 100 (12 weeks, entered 15 August): Reached No. 2 (two weeks)
- Cashbox (14 weeks, entered 8 August): No. 2

It was kept from the No. 1 spot by both: "The House of the Rising Sun" by the Animals and "Oh, Pretty Woman" by Roy Orbison. The song reached No. 15 in the UK Singles Chart and No. 8 in Australia. It sold over one million copies in the United States, attaining a gold disc. The song peaked at No. 2 on the New Zealand Lever Hit Parade chart

== Compilations ==
The song has been featured on numerous compilations, including Billboard Top Rock'n'Roll Hits: 1964 and Classic Rock (Time-Life Music).

== Cover versions ==
- Checkmates, Ltd. as part of a medley on their 1967 debut album, Live! at Caesar's Palace.
- The American Henry Qualls, a Texas and country blues guitarist and singer, covered the song on Blues from Elmo, Texas (1994).
