= The Newbeats =

American pop music trio (1964–1974)

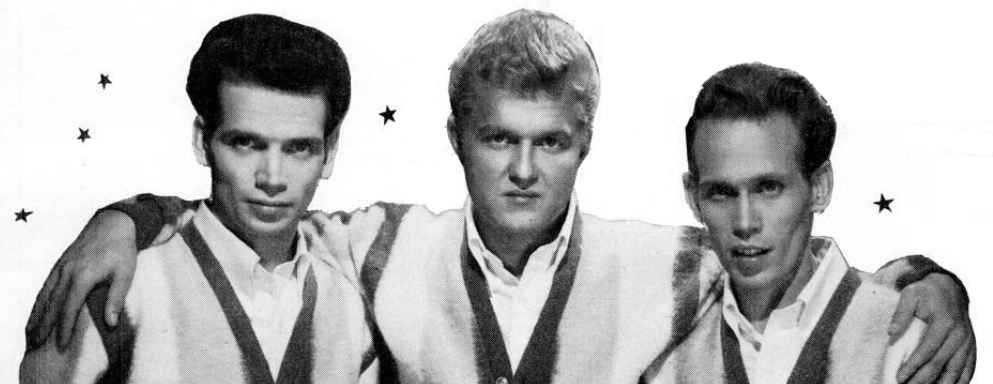
- 1964

Background information
- Origin: Shreveport, Louisiana, U.S.
- Genres: Pop; rhythm and blues; blue-eyed soul; rock and roll
- Years active: 1964–1974
- Labels: Hickory; Buddah; Playboy
- Past members: Larry Henley; Dean Mathis; Mark Mathis

The Newbeats were a 1960s American pop vocal trio, led by Larry Henley. They are best remembered for their hits "Bread and Butter" and "Run, Baby Run".

== Members ==
The group's members were:

- Larry Henley (born Lawrence Joel Henley, June 30, 1937, Arp, Texas, United States; died December 18, 2014)
- Dean Mathis (born Louis Aldine Mathis, March 17, 1939, Hahira, Georgia)
- Mark Mathis (born Marcus Felton Mathis, February 9, 1942, Hahira, Georgia)

== Biography ==
As children, brothers Dean and Mark Mathis were taught the guitar by their mother. They soon mastered other musical instruments – piano, bass guitar, and drums. They both played in a band at Bremen High School, Georgia, and decided on a career in the music industry upon leaving education. Dean joined Paul Howard's Western swing band in 1956 as pianist, then joined Dale Hawkins' band, where his brother soon joined as a bass player. They stayed with the band for two years.

The Mathis brothers recorded together as Dean & Marc for the Chess record label. In 1959, their single "Tell Him No" entered the U.S. Billboard Hot 100 and peaked at no. 42 that year.

They started their own eight-piece band and played in their hometown of Shreveport, Louisiana. It was there that they met Larry Henley, who auditioned for the band. A parting of the ways ensued when Henley tried his luck as a solo artist, and the brothers worked as a duo, both recording independently for Wesley Rose.

After about 18 months they jointly made a demo of a song titled "Bread and Butter", sent it to Hickory Records, and were asked to record the track.

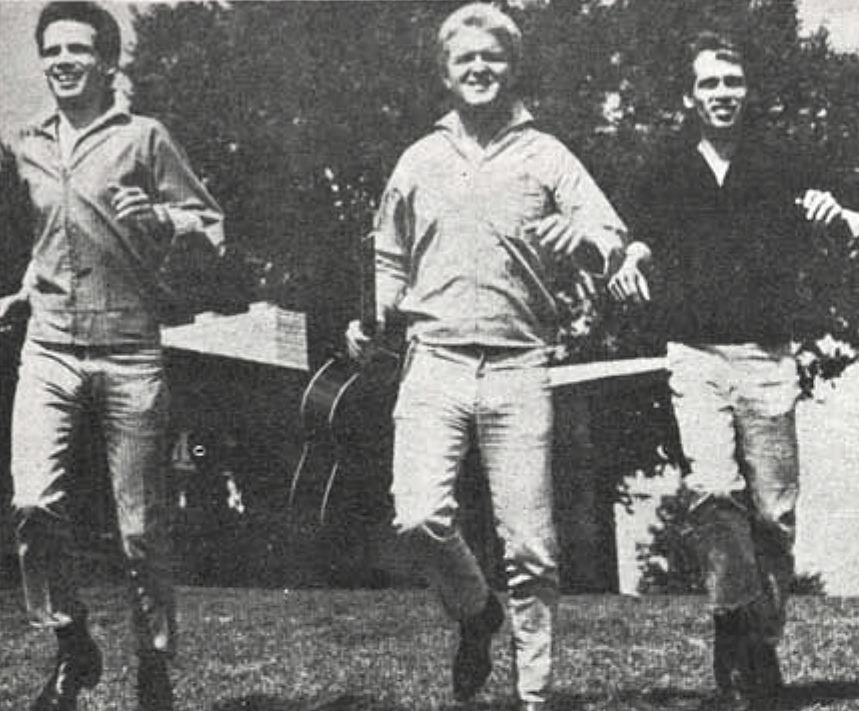

"Bread and Butter" was the group's first hit. Written by Larry Parks and Jay Turnbow, the record reached no. 2 on the Billboard Hot 100 chart. It sold over one million copies in the U.S. Three more singles followed in 1964 and in 1965. "Run, Baby Run (Back Into My Arms)" reached as high as no. 12 the fall of 1965, but that would be the trio's penultimate chart entry, although they remained with Hickory Records until 1972. Brief stints at Buddah and Playboy followed before the group dissolved in 1974.

Several of their singles were rediscovered by the Northern soul movement in the early 1970s. "Run, Baby Run (Back Into My Arms)" made no. 10 in the UK Singles Chart, (two spots higher than its original U.S. position), while "Don't Turn Me Loose" and "Crying My Heart Out Over You" are popular tracks with the "soul crowd".

Henley was known as the co-songwriter of "Wind Beneath My Wings". In 2002 Bruce Channel and Ricky Ray Hector recorded a project with Larry Henley, billed as Original Copy.

"Bread and Butter" features on the soundtrack to the 1998 comedy-drama film Simon Birch and was used for an advertisement campaign for Schmidt's Blue Ribbon Bread. It was also featured in the 2004 Will Ferrell comedy Anchorman: The Legend of Ron Burgundy. The song "Run, Baby Run (Back Into My Arms)" was used in the 2010 John Carpenter horror film The Ward.

Larry Henley died on December 18, 2014, aged 77.

== Discography ==
=== Albums ===
| Year | Album | Billboard 200 | Record Label |
|---|---|---|---|
| 1964 | Bread & Butter | 56 | Hickory Records |
| 1965 | Big Beat Sounds by The Newbeats | – | Hickory Records |
| 1965 | Run Baby Run | 131 | Hickory Records |

=== Singles ===
| Year | Title | Peak chart positions | | | | Record Label | B-side | Album |
| Year | Title | US | UK | AUS | CAN | Record Label | B-side | Album |
|---|---|---|---|---|---|---|---|---|
| 1964 | "Bread and Butter" | 2 | 15 | 8 | 1 | Hickory Records | "Tough Little Buggy" | Bread & Butter |
| 1964 | "Everything's Alright" | 16 | - | 53 | 6 | Hickory Records | "Pink Dally Rue" | Bread & Butter |
| 1965 | "Break Away (from That Boy)" | 40 | - | 7 | 15 | Hickory Records | "Hey-O-Daddy-O" (BB no. 118) | Big Beat Sounds by The Newbeats |
| 1965 | "(The Bees Are for the Birds) The Birds Are for the Bees" | 50 | - | 41 | 35 | Hickory Records | "Better Watch Your Step" | Big Beat Sounds by The Newbeats |
| 1965 | "Little Child" | - | - | - | - | Hickory Records | "I Can't Hear You No More" | Run Baby Run |
| 1965 | "Run, Baby Run (Back Into My Arms)" | 12 | 10 | 66 | 4 | Hickory Records | "Mean Woolly Willie" | Run Baby Run |
| 1966 | "Shake Hands (And Come Out Crying)" | 92 | - | - | - | Hickory Records | "Too Sweet to Be Forgotten" | |
| 1966 | "Crying My Heart Out" | - | - | - | - | Hickory Records | "Short on Love" | |
| 1966 | "Bird Dog" | - | - | - | - | Hickory Records | "Evil Eva" | |
| 1966 | "My Yesterday Love" | - | - | - | - | Hickory Records | "A Patent On Love" | |
| 1967 | "Don't Turn Me Loose" | - | - | - | - | Hickory Records | "You and Me and Happiness" | |
| 1967 | "So Fine" | - | - | - | - | Hickory Records | "Top Secret" | Bread & Butter |
| 1968 | "Michelle De Ann" | - | - | - | - | Hickory Records | "I've Been a Long Time Loving You" | |
| 1968 | "Hide the Moon" | - | - | - | - | Hickory Records | "It's Really Goodbye" | |
| 1968 | "Bad Dreams" | - | - | - | - | Hickory Records | "Swinger" | |
| 1968 | "The Girls and the Boys" | - | - | - | - | Hickory Records | "Ain't That Lovin' You Baby" | |
| 1969 | "Thou Shalt Not Steal" | 128 | - | - | - | Hickory Records | "Great Balls of Fire" | Bread & Butter |
| 1969 | "Groovin (Out on Life)" | 82 | - | - | - | Hickory Records | "Bread and Butter" | |
| 1970 | "Laura (What's He Got That I Ain't Got)" | 115 | - | - | - | Hickory Records | "Break Away (from That Boy)" | |
| 1970 | "She Won't Hang Her Love Out (On the Line)" | - | - | - | - | Hickory Records | "I'm a Teardrop" | |
| 1971 | "Am I Not My Brother's Keeper" | - | - | - | - | Hickory Records | "Run, Baby Run (Back Into My Arms)" | |
| 1972 | "Remember Love" | - | - | - | - | Hickory Records | "Oh, Pretty Woman" | |
| 1972 | "Love Gets Sweeter" | - | - | - | - | Hickory Records | "Everything's Alright" | |
| 1974 | "I Know (You Don't Want Me No More)" | - | - | - | - | Playboy Records | "I Believe I'm in Love With You" | |
| | Short On Love | | | | | | | |

== See also ==
- Where the Action Is
- List of performances on Top of the Pops
