= Thou Shalt Not Steal (song) =

Single by Dick and Dee Dee

from the album Thou Shalt Not Steal
- B-side: "Just 'Round the River Bend"
- Released: October 1964 (US); November 13, 1964 (UK)
- Genre: Folk
- Length: 1:58
- Label: Warner Bros.
- Songwriter(s): John D. Loudermilk
- Producer(s): Don Ralke, The Wilder Brothers

Dick and Dee Dee singles chronology
"Remember When" (1964)	"Thou Shalt Not Steal" (1964)	"Be My Baby" (1965)

"Thou Shalt Not Steal" is a 1964 song written by John D. Loudermilk and performed by Dick and Dee Dee. The song was produced by Don Ralke and The Wilder Brothers.

== Chart performance ==
It reached #13 on the Billboard chart in 1964. In Canada it reached number 17. The song was also released in the United Kingdom as a single, but it did not chart. The song was featured on their 1965 album, Thou Shalt Not Steal.

== Other versions ==
- Loudermilk released the original version of the song in 1962 where it reached #73 on the Billboard chart.
- Glenda Collins released a version as a single in the UK in 1965.
- The Pleazers released a version of the song as part of an EP in New Zealand in 1966.
- The Newbeats released a version as a single in 1969 where it reached #128 on the Billboard chart.
