= Run, Baby Run (Back Into My Arms) =

Single by The Newbeats

from the album Run Baby Run
- B-side: "Mean Woolly Willie"
- Released: September 1965 (US); October 1965 (UK); September 3, 1971 (UK)
- Genre: Pop rock
- Length: 2:59
- Label: Hickory 1332 (1965 release); London 10341 (1971 UK release)
- Songwriter(s): Joe Melson, Don Gant

The Newbeats singles chronology
"Little Child" (1965)	"Run, Baby Run (Back Into My Arms)" (1965)	"Shake Hands (And Come Out Crying)" (1966)

"Run, Baby Run (Back Into My Arms)" is a song written by Joe Melson and Don Gant and performed by The Newbeats. It reached #4 in Canada, #12 on the Billboard Hot 100, and #66 in Australia in 1965. The song was also released in the United Kingdom as a single, but it did not chart on its original release. The group re-released the song as the B-side to their 1971 single, "Am I Not My Brother's Keeper", and in that year, "Run, Baby Run (Back Into My Arms)" reached #10 in the U.K., following extensive playing in Northern Soul clubs in England.

The song was featured on their 1965 album, Run Baby Run.

== Other versions ==
- The Vogues released a version of the song on their 1966 album, Five O'Clock World.
- Les Surfs released a version of the song entitled "Va Dove Vuoi" as the B-side to their 1966 single "Meritavi Molto Di Più".
- The Tremeloes released as version of the song on their 1969 album, The Live in Cabaret.
- Roy Orbison released a version of the song on his 1972 album, Memphis.

== In media ==
- The Newbeats version was featured in the 2010 film, The Ward.
