= Don Ralke =

Don Ralke (full name: Donald Edward Ralke) (July 13, 1920 – January 26, 2000) was an American music arranger, composer, and record producer, who worked for four decades in the Hollywood studio system in films, television, and pop recordings.

== Early life and education ==
He was born on July 13, 1920, in Battle Creek, Michigan, to Carl Henry Ralke and Maude Margaret Mueller. Ralke received his bachelor's and master's degrees in music from the University of Southern California, graduating with honors. He also studied with famed composer and Hollywood emigré Arnold Schoenberg.

== Career ==
On the bongos, Ralke collaborated with versatile flute and reed instrumentalist Buddy Collette on Jazz Heat, Bongo Beat. Warner Bros. hired him for Gershwin with Bongoes and The Savage and The Sensuous, the latter of which is widely regarded as one of the best jungle exotica albums of that era. He worked with Warren Barker on the music for 77 Sunset Strip and did the serious musical work behind Edd "Kookie" Byrnes, one of the show's stars, when Byrnes became a teen idol and recorded his one hit, "Kookie, Kookie (Lend Me Your Comb)". Ralke performed similar duties for Hawaiian Eye star Connie Stevens when she recorded "Sixteen Reasons". Other recordings include Jewel Akens' "The Birds and the Bees", and five other gold records. His orchestra backed Sam Cooke on several 1959–1960 songs. Ralke also recorded two hits by Ty Wagner: "I'm a No Count" and "Slander". He formed his own record company in the late 1960s, and collaborated with sound engineer Brad Miller on the hugely successful strings-with-environmental sounds creation, the Mystic Moods Orchestra.

Working with "Golden Throats talent" became a specialty niche for Ralke. Ralke is credited for convincing non-singers including William Shatner and Lorne Greene to play it safe and stick to narration over a musical background. Ralke also produced Beach Boys dad Murry Wilson's The Many Moods of Murray Wilson which was not kindly lauded by critics but nonetheless has achieved a place as an important footnote in 1960s music.

In 1972, Ralke produced and orchestrated Bob and Dick Sherman's Grammy nominated musical film Snoopy Come Home. In the 1970s, he returned to television, working for producer Garry Marshall on the series Happy Days and its spin-off, Laverne and Shirley.

== Personal life and death ==
Ralke was once described by Stan Ross, co-founder of Gold Star recording studio, as "the most well-known unknown in the business."

Ralke died on January 26, 2000, in Santa Rosa, California.

== Recordings ==
- "77 Sunset Strip" / "Sebastian" - WB 5025 (single)
- "Zooba" / "Stardust" - WB 5058
- Very Truly Yours, Crown Records CLP 5018
- Dance Caper in Hi-Fi, Warner Bros. Records WBS-1300
- Bongo Madness, Crown Records CLP 5019
- Bourbon Street Beat, Warner Bros. Records WBS-1321
- But You've Never Heard Gershwin with Bongoes, Warner Bros. Records WBS-1360
- The Savage and the Sensuous Bongoes, Warner Bros. Records WBS-1398
- Jerry Howard Plays Crazy Guitar, Imperial Records LP-9106
- (arranger/producer on) The Transformed Man, William Shatner Decca DLP-75043
- (arranger/producer on) "Ringo", Lorne Greene
- C'mon Let's Live a Little (soundtrack), Liberty LST-7430
- (arranger/producer on) Snoopy Come Home Original Cast Soundtrack

== Production and arrangement ==
Among the artists he either produced or arranged included Dick and Dee Dee.

=== The Cappetta Company ===
The Cappetta Company was a group that featured Suzie Cappetta. In the 1960s she wrote the song "Dave Hull, the Hullabalooer" which she and her group the Scuzzies recorded. Ralke did the arrangements on the Cappetta Company's single "Me And Bobby McGee" / "Gimme' That", which was produced by Ken Jenkins and engineered by Stan Ross.

=== Vic Malo ===
Hawaiian based Tongan singer/actor Vic Malo worked with Ralke. Malo in the late 1970s appeared as Billy Swan in Hawaii Five-O. Also known as Vic Mataele, he was a fencing instructor, and related to the King of Tonga, Tāufaʻāhau Tupou IV. Ralke produced his self titled album. Malo's single "I Play Guitar And Sing A Song" / "Still No Emotion Shows", was also produced by Ralke.
