= Kim Basinger filmography =

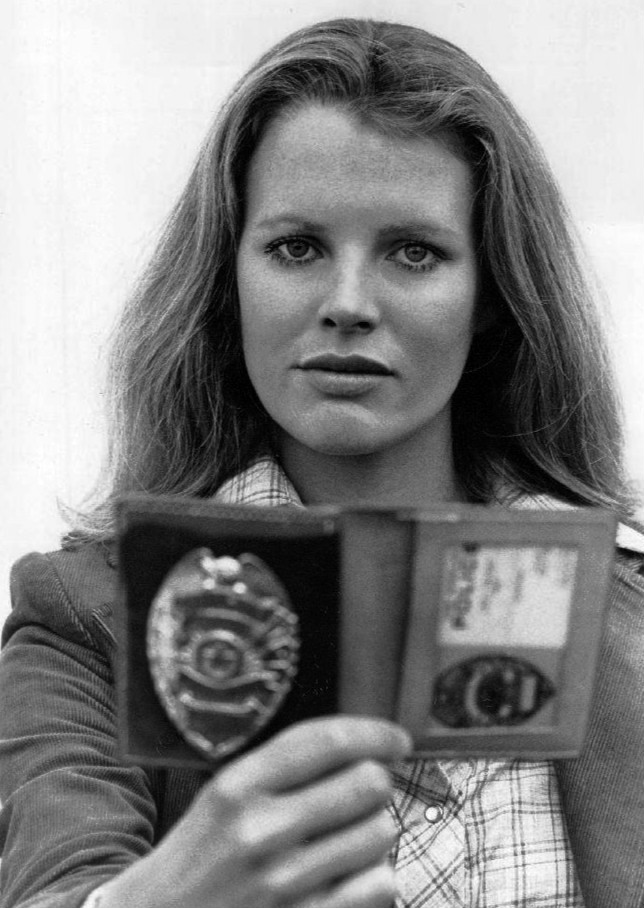
Basinger as J.Z. Kane in Dog and Cat (1977)

Kim Basinger is an American actress who made her television debut as Sheila in "Night Train to Dallas", an episode of the action/adventure drama series Gemini Man that aired on NBC in 1976. She starred in two canceled series as well as several made-for-TV films, including a remake of From Here to Eternity (1979). Her feature film debut was in 1981 drama Hard Country. Basinger came to prominence playing Bond girl Domino Petachi in the 1983 film Never Say Never Again, opposite Sean Connery, and went on to receive a Golden Globe nomination for her role as Memo Paris in The Natural (1984). She also starred as Elizabeth in the controversial erotic romantic drama 9½ Weeks (1986) with Mickey Rourke, as the title character in Nadine with Jeff Bridges (1987) and as Vicki Vale in Tim Burton's blockbuster Batman (1989), which remains the highest-grossing film of her career.

In 1991, she played a glamorous singer in the comedy The Marrying Man alongside her future husband, Alec Baldwin. They then both starred in the remake The Getaway in 1994. She won the Academy Award for Best Supporting Actress for her performance as Lynn Bracken in the 1997 film L.A. Confidential; as well as, the Golden Globe for Best Supporting Actress and the SAG Award for Best Supporting Actress.

She played the role of Kuki Gallmann, an Italian who moved to Kenya to start a new life, in the 2000 film I Dreamed of Africa. Her other films include 8 Mile (2002), The Door in the Floor (2004), Cellular (2004), and The Nice Guys (2016).

== Film ==
Key
†	Denotes films that have not yet been released

Year	Title	Role	Director	Notes	Ref.
1981	Hard Country	Jodie	David Greene		
1982	Mother Lode	Andrea Spalding	Charlton Heston		
1983	Never Say Never Again	Domino Petachi	Irvin Kershner		
1983	The Man Who Loved Women	Louise Carr	Blake Edwards		
1984	The Natural	Memo Paris	Barry Levinson		
1985	Fool for Love	May	Robert Altman		
1986	9½ Weeks	Elizabeth McGraw	Adrian Lyne		
1986	No Mercy	Michele Duval	Richard Pearce		
1987	Blind Date	Nadia Gates	Blake Edwards		
1987	Nadine	Nadine Hightower	Robert Benton		
1988	My Stepmother Is an Alien	Celeste Martin	Richard Benjamin		
1989	Batman	Vicki Vale	Tim Burton		
1991	The Marrying Man	Vicki Anderson	Jerry Rees		
1992	Final Analysis	Heather Evans	Phil Joanou		
1992	Cool World	Holli Would	Ralph Bakshi		
1993	The Real McCoy	Karen McCoy	Russell Mulcahy		
1993	Wayne's World 2	Honey Hornée	Stephen Surjik		
1994	The Getaway	Carol McCoy	Roger Donaldson		
1994	Ready to Wear (Prêt-à-Porter)	Kitty Potter	Robert Altman		
1997	L.A. Confidential	Lynn Bracken	Curtis Hanson		
2000	I Dreamed of Africa	Kuki Gallmann	Hugh Hudson		
2000	Bless the Child	Maggie O'Connor	Chuck Russell		
2002	8 Mile	Stephanie Smith	Curtis Hanson		
2002	People I Know	Victoria Gray	Daniel Algrant		
2004	The Door in the Floor	Marion Cole	Tod Williams		
2004	Elvis Has Left the Building	Harmony Jones	Joel Zwick		
2004	Cellular	Jessica Martin	David R. Ellis		
2006	Even Money	Carolyn Carver	Mark Rydell		
2006	The Sentinel	Sarah Ballentine	Clark Johnson		
2008	The Burning Plain	Gina	Guillermo Arriaga		
2008	While She Was Out	Della Myers	Susan Montford	Also executive producer	
2008	The Informers	Laura Sloan	Gregor Jordan		
2010	Charlie St. Cloud	Claire St. Cloud	Burr Steers		
2012	Black November	Kristy	Jeta Amata		
2013	Third Person	Elaine Leary	Paul Haggis		
2013	Grudge Match	Sally Rose	Peter Segal		
2014	4 Minute Mile	Claire Jacobs	Charles-Olivier Michaud		
2014	The 11th Hour	Maria	Anders Morgenthaler		
2016	The Nice Guys	Judith Kuttner	Shane Black		
2017	Fifty Shades Darker	Elena Lincoln	James Foley		
2018	Fifty Shades Freed	Elena Lincoln	James Foley	Unrated version only	
2021	Back Home Again	Mother Bear	Michael Mankowski	Voice; short film	
TBA	Getting Lost †	TBA	Michael Mankowski	Voice; filming	

== Television ==
Year	Title	Role	Network	Notes	Ref.
1976	Gemini Man	Sheila	NBC	Episode: "Night Train to Dallas"	
1976	Charlie's Angels	Linda Oliver	ABC	Episode: "Angels in Chains"	
1977	McMillan & Wife	Janet Carney	NBC	Episode: "Dark Sunrise"	
1977	The Six Million Dollar Man	Lorraine Stenger	ABC	Episode: "The Ultimate Imposter"	
1977	Dog and Cat	Officer J.Z. Kane	ABC	Television series	
1978	The Ghost of Flight 401	Prissy Frasier	NBC	Television movie based on a true story	
1978	Katie: Portrait of a Centerfold	Katie McEvera	NBC	Television movie	
1978	Vega$	Allison Jorden	ABC	Episode: "Lady Ice"	
1979	From Here to Eternity	Lorene Rogers	NBC	TV miniseries	
1980	From Here to Eternity	Lorene Rogers	NBC	TV series spin-off	
1981	Killjoy	Laury Medford	CBS	Television movie	
1992	Dame Edna's Hollywood	Herself	NBC	Episode: "1.2"	
1994	Saturday Night Live	Host	NBC	Episode: "Alec Baldwin & Kim Basinger/UB40"	
1998	The Simpsons	Herself	FOX	Voice; episode: "When You Dish Upon a Star"	
2003	Rita	Narrator	Turner Classic Movies	Documentary	
2006	The Mermaid Chair	Jessie Sullivan	Lifetime	Television movie	
2010	Mystery of the Hope Diamond	Narrator	Smithsonian Channel	Documentary	
2017	Comrade Detective	Sally Smith	Amazon Prime Video	Voice; episode: "The Invisible Hand"	

== Music videos ==
Year	Title	Performer	Album	Ref.
1992	"Shake Your Head"	Was (Not Was) featuring Kim Basinger & Ozzy Osbourne	Hello Dad... I'm in Jail	
1993	"Mary Jane's Last Dance"	Tom Petty and the Heartbreakers	Greatest Hits	

== See also ==
- List of awards and nominations received by Kim Basinger
