= List of awards and nominations received by Kim Basinger =

Kim Basinger awards and nominations
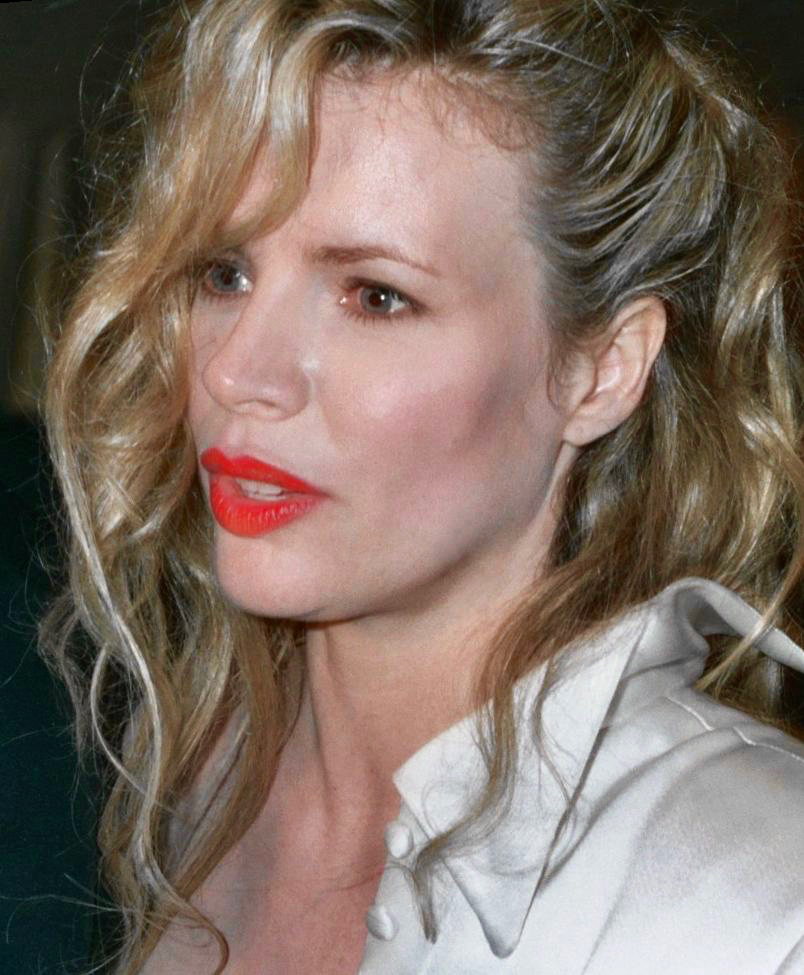
- Basinger at the 62nd Academy Awards, held at the Dorothy Chandler Pavilion in Los Angeles, California on March 26, 1990
Totals
| Award | Wins | Nominations |
| Academy Awards | 1 | 1 |
| BE Awards | 0 | 1 |
| BSFC Awards | 0 | 1 |
| BAFTA Awards | 0 | 1 |
| Golden Apples | 1 | 1 |
| Golden Globes | 1 | 2 |
| HWF Awards | 1 | 1 |
| Jupiter Awards | 1 | 1 |
| KFF Awards | 1 | 1 |
| MTV Movie Awards | 0 | 4 |
| NBR Awards | 1 | 1 |
| People's Choice Awards | 0 | 1 |
| Razzie Awards | 1 | 7 |
| Saturn Awards | 0 | 3 |
| SAG Awards | 1 | 2 |
| STFC Awards | 0 | 1 |
| SEFCA Awards | 1 | 1 |
| Wins | 10 |
| Nominations | 29 |

The following is a list of awards and nominations received by Kim Basinger, chronicling her achievements in the film industry.

Basinger has won an Academy Award, a Golden Globe Award, a Screen Actors Guild Award, and a Southeastern Film Critics Association award, all for Best Supporting Actress in L.A. Confidential (1997). The entire cast of Prêt-à-Porter (1994), in which she played a role, received an ensemble award from the National Board of Review.

For her lifetime achievements in the cinematic arts, she has a motion pictures star on the Hollywood Walk of Fame and is a recipient of the Athena Award at the Kudzu Film Festival. She has been nominated at the British Academy Film Awards, the People's Choice Awards, the Saturn Awards (three times), and the MTV Movie Awards (four times).

== Awards and nominations ==
=== Academy Awards ===
The Academy Awards, commonly known as "the Oscars", is an annual ceremony organized by the Academy of Motion Picture Arts and Sciences (AMPAS) to recognize excellence of professionals in the film industry. Basinger won an award in 1997.

| Year | Nominated work | Category | Result |
|---|---|---|---|
| 1998 | L.A. Confidential | Best Supporting Actress | Won |

=== Blockbuster Entertainment Awards ===
The Blockbuster Entertainment Awards are awards bestowed by an American-based provider of home video and video game rental services, Blockbuster LLC. Basinger was nominated once (in 2000).

| Year | Nominated work | Category | Result |
|---|---|---|---|
| 2000 | Bless the Child | Favorite Actress – Suspense | Nominated |

=== Boston Society of Film Critics Awards ===
The Boston Society of Film Critics (BSFC) is an organization of film reviewers from Boston, Massachusetts, United States–based publications, which was formed in 1981 to honor commendations to the best of the year's films and filmmakers, and local film theaters and film societies that offer outstanding film programming. Basinger was nominated in 2004.

| Year | Nominated work | Category | Result |
|---|---|---|---|
| 2004 | The Door in the Floor | Best Actress | Runner-up^{[A]} |

=== British Academy Film Awards ===
The British Academy Film Awards are presented in an annual award show hosted by the British Academy of Film and Television Arts (BAFTA), as the British equivalent of the Oscars. The ceremony used to take place in April or May, but from 2002 onwards it takes place in February in order to precede the U.S. Academy Awards. Basinger was nominated once (in 1997).

| Year | Nominated work | Category | Result |
|---|---|---|---|
| 1997 | L.A. Confidential | Best Actress in a Leading Role | Nominated |

=== Golden Apples ===
The Golden Apple Award is an American award presented to entertainers by the Hollywood Women's Press Club, usually in recognition not of performance but of behavior. The award has been presented since 1941 and includes categories recognizing actors for being easy to work with, as well as categories chastising actors for being rude or difficult. In the 1970s, the format was altered slightly to include recognition of breakthrough actors while continuing to recognize established actors (changed from "most cooperative" to "star of the year") as well as identifying uncooperative actors ("sour apples"). Basinger was nominated once (in 1991).

| Year | Nominated work | Category | Result |
|---|---|---|---|
| 1991 | Herself | Sour Apple | Won |

=== Golden Globe Awards ===
The Golden Globe Award is an accolade presented by the members of the Hollywood Foreign Press Association (HFPA) to recognize excellence in film and television, both domestic and foreign. The formal ceremonies are presented annually as a major part of the film industry's awards season, culminating each year with the Oscars. Basinger has won one trophy, in addition to being nominated two times (in 1984 and 1997).

| Year | Nominated work | Category | Result |
|---|---|---|---|
| 1985 | The Natural | Best Supporting Actress — Motion Picture | Nominated |
| 1998 | L.A. Confidential | Best Supporting Actress — Motion Picture | Won |

=== Hollywood Walk of Fame ===
The Hollywood Walk of Fame, administered by the Hollywood chamber of commerce, consists of more than 2,600 five-pointed terrazzo and brass stars embedded in the sidewalks along fifteen blocks of Hollywood Boulevard and three blocks of Vine Street in Hollywood. The stars are permanent public monuments to achievement in the entertainment industry, bearing the names of a mix of actors, musicians, directors, producers, musical and theatrical groups, fictional characters, and others. In 1992, Basinger received a star in the category of motion pictures. Her star is located at 7021 Hollywood Boulevard.

| Year | Nominated work | Category | Result |
|---|---|---|---|
| 1992 | — | Motion Picture Star | Inducted |

=== Jupiter Awards ===
| Year | Nominated work | Category | Result |
|---|---|---|---|
| 1987 | Blind Date | Best International Actress | Won |
| 1987 | Nadine | Best International Actress | Won |
| 1987 | No Mercy | Best International Actress | Won |

=== Kudzu Film Festival Awards ===
| Year | Nominated work | Category | Result |
|---|---|---|---|
| 1999 | Herself | Athena Award (for achievements in the cinematic arts) | Won |

=== MTV Movie Awards ===
The MTV Movie Awards are presented annually on MTV. The nominees are decided by producers and executives at MTV. Winners are decided online by the general public. Presently voting is done through MTV's official website through a special Movie Awards link at movieawards.mtv.com. Unlike its sister event MTV Video Music Awards broadcast live, up to 2007 the MTV Movie Awards were taped and then broadcast a few days later. Basinger has been nominated four times (in 1992–1994), while in two categories.

| Year | Nominated work | Category | Result |
|---|---|---|---|
| 1992 | Final Analysis | Most Desirable Female | Nominated |
| 1993 | Cool World | Most Desirable Female | Nominated |
| 1994 | The Getaway | Most Desirable Female | Nominated |
| 1994 | Wayne's World 2 | Best Kiss (shared with Dana Carvey) | Nominated |

=== National Board of Review Awards ===
The National Board of Review (NBR) was founded in 1909 in New York City, originally established as the New York Board of Motion Picture Censorship. In 1930, the NBR was the first group to choose the ten best English-language movies of the year and the best foreign films, and is still the first critical body to announce its annual awards. Basinger earned an award in 1994.

| Year | Nominated work | Category | Result |
|---|---|---|---|
| 1994 | Prêt-à-Porter (Ready to Wear) | Best Acting by an Ensemble | Won^{[B]} |

=== People's Choice Awards ===
The People's Choice Awards is an American awards show recognizing the people and the work of popular culture since 1975. As such, it is voted on by the general public. Basinger received one nomination (in 1990).

| Year | Nominated work | Category | Result |
|---|---|---|---|
| 1989 | Herself | Favorite Motion Picture Actress | Nominated |

=== Razzie Awards ===
The Golden Raspberry Awards, abbreviated as the Razzies, is an anti-award presented in recognition of the worst in movies, on the contrary. The term raspberry in the name is used in its irreverent sense, as in "blowing a raspberry". The annual show, founded in 1981 by publicist John J. B. Wilson, precedes the corresponding Academy Awards ceremony by one day. Overall, Basinger was nominated seven times (in 1986, 1991–1992, 1994, 2000, 2004 and 2017).

| Year | Nominated work | Category | Result |
|---|---|---|---|
| 1986 | 9½ Weeks | Worst Actress | Nominated |
| 1991 | The Marrying Man | Worst Actress | Nominated |
| 1992 | Cool World | Worst Actress | Nominated |
| 1992 | Final Analysis | Worst Actress | Nominated |
| 1994 | The Getaway | Worst Actress | Nominated |
| 2000 | Bless the Child | Worst Actress | Nominated |
| 2000 | I Dreamed of Africa | Worst Actress | Nominated |
| 2004 | Herself | Special Award – Worst Razzie Loser of Our First 25 Years | Nominated |
| 2017 | Fifty Shades Darker | Worst Supporting Actress | Won |

=== Saturn Awards ===
The Academy of Science Fiction, Fantasy and Horror Films (ASFFF) presents each year the Saturn Awards, which honor the top works in science fiction, fantasy, and horror in film, television and home video since 1972. Basinger was nominated three times in total (in 1988, 1990 and 2004).

| Year | Nominated work | Category | Result |
|---|---|---|---|
| 1988 | My Stepmother Is an Alien | Best Actress | Nominated |
| 1989-90 | Batman | Best Supporting Actress | Nominated |
| 2004 | Cellular | Best Supporting Actress | Nominated |

=== Screen Actors Guild Awards ===
The Screen Actors Guild Awards, the only national network television show to acknowledge the work of union members and one of the major awards events in Hollywood since 1995, is an accolade given by the Screen Actors Guild (SAG) to recognize outstanding performances by its members. Basinger won once, while being nominated twice (both in 1997).

| Year | Nominated work | Category | Result |
|---|---|---|---|
| 1998 | L.A. Confidential | Outstanding Performance by a Female Actor in a Supporting Role | Won^{[C]} |
| 1998 | L.A. Confidential | Outstanding Performance by a Cast in a Motion Picture | Nominated^{[D]} |

=== Society of Texas Film Critics Awards ===
| Year | Nominated work | Category | Result |
|---|---|---|---|
| 1997 | L.A. Confidential | Best Supporting Actress | Runner-up |

=== Southeastern Film Critics Association Awards ===
The Southeastern Film Critics Association (SEFCA) is an organization of film reviewers from publications based in the Southeastern United States. In December of each year, the SEFCA meets to vote on their Southeastern Film Critics Association Awards for films released in the same calendar year. Basinger won once (in 1997).

| Year | Nominated work | Category | Result |
|---|---|---|---|
| 1997 | L.A. Confidential | Best Actress in a Supporting Role | Won |

== Notes ==
- A Tied with Annette Bening for Being Julia.
- B Shared with Danny Aiello, Anouk Aimée, Lauren Bacall, Michel Blanc, Anne Canovas, Jean-Pierre Cassel, Richard E. Grant, Rupert Everett, Teri Garr, Linda Hunt, Sally Kellerman, Ute Lemper, Tara Leon, Sophia Loren, Lyle Lovett, Chiara Mastroianni, Marcello Mastroianni, Tom Novembre, Rossy de Palma, Stephen Rea, Tim Robbins, Julia Roberts, Georgianna Robertson, Jean Rochefort, Lili Taylor, Tracey Ullman and Forest Whitaker.
- C Tied with Gloria Stuart for Titanic.
- D Shared with James Cromwell, Russell Crowe, Danny DeVito, Guy Pearce, Kevin Spacey and David Strathairn.

== See also ==
- Kim Basinger filmography
- List of stars on the Hollywood Walk of Fame
