= I Dreamed of Africa (book) =

Memoir by Kuki Gallmann

I Dreamed of Africa is a memoir by Italian writer Kuki Gallmann. The book focuses on Gallmann's lifelong interest in Africa.

== Plot ==
The memoir ranges from her childhood's fascination with the continent (whence the title) to her 1972 decision to relocate to Kenya to run a farm in the Laikipia plain with her husband and son. Gallmann published the book in 1991, twenty years after moving to Kenya, and she chose to write it in English as this was by then her adoptive language. The book is often compared to Karen Blixen's Out of Africa, as the subject has several traits in common, and the setting is, in both cases, the savannahs of Kenya, in the Great Rift Valley area. The 2000 film of the same title, starring Kim Basinger and directed by Hugh Hudson, is based on the book.
