= Garrett Strommen =

American actor

- Born: Garrett M. Strommen; October 8, 1982 (age 43)
- Occupations: Actor, Entrepreneur, Artist
- Years active: 2000 — 2014

Garrett Strommen is an American actor, entrepreneur, author, and visual artist born on October 8, 1982, in St. Louis, Missouri.

== Career ==
Before his big break in the movie I Dreamed of Africa with Daniel Craig and Kim Basinger in 2000, he got his start in Italy with school productions. He lived in Rome, for over 8 years where he attended St. Stephen's International School and went on to win the Reverend Wilbur C. Woodhams Medal for excellence in the arts. His father is Kim Strommen, who served as Dean of Temple University Rome's study abroad campus for 25 years and his mother is Genell Miller, a visual artist and art professor. In 2006 he graduated from the prestigious creative writing program at UCLA cum laude. He is currently the founder and president of Strommen Inc., a private language instruction and translation company and an angel investor in Rufus Labs. Acting roles include recurring roles in the TV drama 7th Heaven, an appearance as the victim in Cold Case and an appearance on Without a Trace. Recently, he was in an episode of CSI: NY, Heroes (TV series) and a cameo in "Dead of Night," a film based on the Italian comic book Dylan Dog.

He is fluent in English, Italian and Spanish. He likes painting and sculpting.
