= MOJO Sports =

Sports technology and media platform

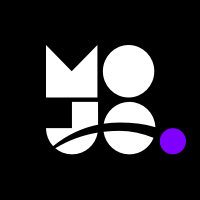
- Founded: 2019
- Founder: Ben Sherwood, Reed Shaffner

MOJO Sports is a Los Angeles-based youth sports technology and media platform that provides coaching instruction, team management tools and multimedia sharing to coaches, athletes and families involved with the five major youth sports: soccer (football), flag football, basketball, baseball and softball.

== History ==
MOJO was founded in 2019 by Ben Sherwood, the former president of Disney-ABC TV Group. Sherwood created MOJO with Reed Shaffner, a product leader at Microsoft, Zynga, Scopely, and Workpop, a company he co-founded and later sold. Sherwood and Shaffner raised funds in 2020, with Alpha Edison Ventures leading the effort along with investors including television producer Tom Werner.

The MOJO app launched in February 2021 with a youth soccer curriculum, focused on coaching content and practice plans. The drill videos, shot at the Banc of California Stadium, were produced by Mandalay Sports. The app launched as an education partner of US Youth Soccer, a non-profit sports association.

== Product ==
MOJO is geared toward coaches and families with kids between the ages of 4 and 13. Coaches can roster and schedule games, and parents can chat and keep score and share highlights during games. The MOJO app also includes player cards that players can customize with stickers and backgrounds.

== Board ==
MOJO has an academic and scientific advisory board made up of experts on youth sports, kinesiology and psychology—including Jenny Etnier, a professor of kinesiology at the University of North Carolina at Greensboro; Dan Gould, a professor and director of the Institute for the Study of Youth Sports at Michigan State University; Andrew MacIntosh, a vice president at RISE, a nonprofit educational company; and Zhang Hongjiang, a computer scientist. It also has an athletic advisory board that includes U.S. Women's National Team stars Julie Foudy and Brandi Chastain and Russell Wilson, NFL quarterback and NFL FLAG co-owner and chairman.

== Partners ==
As MOJO launched additional sports, the company secured partnerships with NFL FLAG and FC Barcelona, both in August 2021 and the Jr. NBA in October 2021. In February 2022, MOJO became partners with Major League Baseball, as well as Major League Soccer in August 2022.

MOJO's non-league partners include the Positive Coaching Alliance (June 2021) and the Aspen Institute’s Sports & Society Program (September 2021).

== Awards ==
- 2021, Best Sports App in the 25th Annual Webby Awards
- 2021 Project Play Champion, Aspen Institute's Project Play
- 2021, Best Employers in Sports honoree by Front Office Sports
- 2022, National Youth Sports Strategy (NYSS) Champion by the U.S. Department of Health and Human Services (HHS)
- 2023, One of the World's Most Innovative Companies by Fast Company
