= Charlie St. Cloud =

2010 film by Burr Steers

- Theatrical release poster
- Directed by: Burr Steers
- Screenplay by: Craig Pearce; Lewis Colick
- Based on: The Death and Life of Charlie St. Cloud by Ben Sherwood
- Produced by: Marc Platt
- Starring: Zac Efron; Amanda Crew; Donal Logue; Charlie Tahan; Ray Liotta; Kim Basinger
- Cinematography: Enrique Chediak
- Edited by: Padraic McKinley
- Music by: Rolfe Kent
- Production companies: Relativity Media; Marc Platt Productions
- Distributed by: Universal Pictures
- Release date: July 30, 2010
- Running time: 99 minutes
- Country: United States
- Language: English
- Budget: $44 million
- Box office: $48.2 million

Charlie St. Cloud is a 2010 American supernatural drama film based on Ben Sherwood's novel The Death and Life of Charlie St. Cloud, published in 2004 by Bantam Books. In some markets the film used the complete title of the book. The film is directed by Burr Steers and stars Zac Efron, Amanda Crew, Donal Logue, Charlie Tahan, Ray Liotta and Kim Basinger.

The story is about Charlie St. Cloud's choice between keeping a promise he made to his younger brother, who died in a car accident, or going after the girl he loves.

After winning the rights to adapt the book into film, Universal Pictures had James Schamus and Lewis Colick write drafts for the script, with Craig Pearce writing the final script, and director Steers helping to polish it for completion. The film's production (by Relativity Media and Marc Platt Productions) began in upstate New York and British Columbia. Filming lasted from July to late October 2009, with much of it occurring in upstate New York's forest and Gibsons' coastal pier.

Charlie St. Cloud was theatrically released in the United States on July 30, 2010, and received unfavorable reviews from critics. The film was a box office disappointment, having grossed just $48.2 million worldwide against a production budget of $44 million, not including advertisement and distribution costs.

== Plot ==
Charlie St. Cloud, with his younger brother Sam, wins a boating race on his sailboat Splendid Splinter, subsequently receiving a sailing scholarship to Stanford University. He graduates from Winslow High School and after graduation, Charlie promises Sam they will practice baseball every day until he leaves for Stanford.

That night, Charlie wants to attend a graduation party with his friends, but his mother makes him babysit Sam. Charlie tries sneaking out to the party, but Sam catches him and asks for a ride to his friend Tommy's house. While on the road, Charlie reassures him that his departure will not be like their father's abandonment.

The car later gets rear-ended by a SUV, pushing them into an intersection where they are T-boned by a 18-wheeler, killing Sam. During an out-of-body experience, but before dying, he tells Charlie to never leave him so that he will always be with him.

Paramedic Florio Ferrente revives Charlie but Sam dies in his arms. At the funeral, Charlie runs off, unable to put Sam's baseball glove in the grave. Running through the woods, he finds his spirit and discovers they can interact. Charlie fulfills Sam's dying wish by practicing baseball with him every day at sunset, even though it keeps Sam's spirit from "moving on."

Five years later, Charlie is a caretaker at Waterside Cemetery, having abandoned his scholarship. He continues to interact with ghosts, including his friend Sully who died in the Marines. Charlie runs into Florio, who is dying of cancer and encourages him to live his life more fully, in search of the reason why he was saved. At the docks, Charlie meets Tess Carroll, an old classmate and sailor planning to solo-sail around the world.

The following day, Charlie finds an injured Tess tending her father's grave. He tends to her at his home and they develop a relationship. Later, when Charlie arrives late to see Sam, he says he felt Charlie forgetting him and himself disappearing. Charlie explains his ongoing relationship with Sam to Tess, who has followed him, and breaks up with her to not lose Sam.

Charlie learns that Tess disappeared with her boat in a storm three days earlier. After meeting her on the docks, he believes he has really been interacting with her spirit as she appeared at the cemetery, and he assumes she died at sea.

Florio's wife Carla tells Charlie that Florio died the previous night, giving him his St. Jude medallion. Remembering that Florio believed there is no such thing as a lost cause, he becomes convinced that Tess is alive and that he was saved to save her now. With his friend Alistair and Tess's coach Tink, Charlie takes Tink's boat to find her.

At sunset, Charlie misses his game with Sam, causing him to move on from the living world, as the brothers affirm their love. Sam appears to him as a shooting star, revealing Tess' location. They find the wrecked boat and an unconscious Tess. Charlie uses his body heat to keep her warm until the Coast Guard arrives, protecting her against hypothermia.

Later, Charlie invites Tess to ride with him on an old sail boat he has bought. She is afraid, as she has had vivid dreams about them together. Charlie tells her that these are memories, reciting a quote from her father's funeral that he discussed with her spirit. He quits his job and makes his final peace with Sam's spirit. Some time later, they set off to sail around the world.

== Cast ==
- Zac Efron as Charlie St. Cloud
- Amanda Crew as Tess Carroll
- Donal Logue as Tink Weatherbee
- Charlie Tahan as Sam St. Cloud, Charlie's younger brother
- Augustus Prew as Alistair Woolley
- Ray Liotta as Florio Ferrente
- Kim Basinger as Claire St. Cloud, Charlie's mother
- Tegan Moss as Cindy
- Dave Franco as Timothy Patrick Sullivan

== Production ==
A bidding war for the film rights to the book by author Ben Sherwood broke out in April and May 2003, before the book was published, with three studios competing for the rights. Universal Studios and Marc Platt (Universal's president of production) prevailed, paying a reported [estimated] $500,000 to $1 million for the rights (with that figure rising above $1 million if the film is made). Ben Sherwood was guaranteed an executive producer credit on the film, and Universal Studios executive producer Donna Langley was assigned to the picture. Joe Johnston was initially chosen to direct.

Drafts for the script were written by James Schamus and Lewis Colick, but the final script was written by Craig Pearce. By March 2009, Johnston had been replaced as director by Burr Steers, and Platt had named himself as producer. Steers helped polish the script. The first lead performer cast in the film was Zac Efron, who turned down the lead role in Paramount Pictures' remake of Footloose to star in this film. Pre-production had commenced by March 2009, with filming set to begin in July 2009.

Training with Efron began in Vancouver, British Columbia, in July 2009, and started production in upstate New York July 2009 to October 5. Amanda Crew joined the film as Tess Carroll in July 2009, and shot her scenes the following September. A number of scenes in the film were shot in Gibsons, British Columbia, including a scene in the famous 'Beachcombers' restaurant. Portions of the film were filmed at a Deep Cove school, Seycove Secondary School, in North Vancouver, British Columbia. Kim Basinger agreed to play Louise St. Cloud (later Claire) in mid-August 2009. Chris Massoglia was signed in October 2009 to play a teenaged Sam St. Cloud, but never made it into the final film. Efron wrapped his scenes in late October 2009.

Rolfe Kent wrote the score, with Tony Blondal orchestrating. It was recorded at Skywalker Sound, Marin County, California. Kelvin Humenny served as the art director for the film.

== Music ==
Following is a list of music featured in the film, but not included in the soundtrack:

- "Baby Rhys Blues" by The McKinley South Experience featuring Mick Sihkins
- "Helicopter" by Bloc Party
- "Oh, No" by Andrew Bird
- "Rasputin" by Studio K
- "We're Gonna Play" by Matthew Barber
- "While We Were Dreaming" by Pink Mountaintops
- "California Sun" by Ramones
- "Magic Show" by Electric Owls
- "Pull My Heart Away" by Jack Peñate

== Reception ==
=== Box office ===
Charlie St. Cloud was released on July 30, 2010, and earned $12.4 million during its opening weekend, grossing $31.2 million in the United States and Canada, and earning another $17 million in other territories, for a worldwide total of $48.2 million, against a production budget of $44 million.

=== Critical response ===
On Rotten Tomatoes, the film has an approval percentage of 27% based on 121 reviews and a rating of 4.60 out of 10. The critics consensus reads: "Zac Efron gives it his all, but Charlie St. Cloud is too shallow and cloying to offer much more than eye candy for his fans." On Metacritic, the film has a score of 37 out of 100 based on 30 critic reviews, meaning "Generally Unfavorable". Audiences polled by CinemaScore gave the film an average grade of "B+" on an A+ to F scale.

Film critic A. O. Scott of The New York Times commended Efron for having enough "geniality and melancholy" in the title role and cinematographer Enrique Chediak for giving the scenery a "convincingly romantic look and mood," but found the film overall conflicted with being a supernatural romantic drama that plays like a horror movie in certain places, concluding that "you are supposed to be transported beyond skepticism on a wave of pure, tacky feeling. Instead, in this case, you drown in sentimental, ghoulish nonsense." Bruce DeMara of the Toronto Star gave praise to Efron as the title character but felt it wasn't enough to elevate the film from being "too formulaic, pretentious and cloying," concluding that "if your intent is to drink in the stunning hunkiness of Zac Efron, he's there in virtually every frame, brooding, wry, intense and actually somewhat believable. Too bad the rest of this ghost story doesn't hold up." Betsy Sharkey of the Los Angeles Times wrote: "The good news is that Efron continues to get better with each film; he just hasn't gotten a role yet that will finally put his acting potential to the test." Entertainment Weekly's Owen Gleiberman gave the film a "C−" grade, criticizing Efron's pretty boy facials for not displaying the character's emotional despair but "a fake-profound, lost-idol tranquility."

The Hollywood Reporter's Kirk Honeycutt called it "the latest to portray everlasting love on the screen and [the film] doesn't just fail, it actually gets sillier by the minute." The Guardian's Peter Bradshaw wrote: "Like a high-jumper cracking the bar in two with his forehead, former teen star Zac Efron fails to make it into the Mature Performer league in this unendurable romantic drama, filmed in the buttery late-summer glow I associate with movies such as Message in a Bottle and The Notebook." Wesley Morris of The Boston Globe wrote that Efron lacked suitable material to make his character interesting and that Steers' direction "cares not for pacing [or] depth or the power of real emotion," saying "the movie is very much dead already. It has no pulse, no apparent breath, and a curious odor seems to waft from the screen not long after Charlie and Sam win a race together in the opening scene." Mark Jenkins of NPR felt the film lacked "genuine emotion" to backup its concept and that Efron was miscast in the title character role, concluding that, "[U]nlike The Lovely Bones, this film doesn't attempt to show the afterlife as experienced by those who die too young. But then, who needs Heaven when you live in a picturesque sailing village in Microsoftland? Charlie St. Cloud may be a tale of loss, but its characters seem to have everything they could possibly want."

=== Accolades ===
Efron was nominated for a Teen Choice Award for Choice Summer Movie Star - Male and an MTV Movie Award for Best Male Performance for his work in the film, but they both went to Robert Pattinson for The Twilight Saga: Eclipse. Tahan was nominated for Best Performance by a Younger Actor at the 37th Saturn Awards, but lost the award to Chloë Grace Moretz for Let Me In.
