= Kelvin Humenny =

Canadian art director

- Born: March 3, 1968 (age 57); Saskatchewan, Canada
- Occupation: Art director

Kelvin Humenny (born March 3, 1968) is a Canadian art director.

== Filmography ==
- Tomorrowland (2015)
- Dawn of the Planet of the Apes (2014)
- Charlie St. Cloud (2010)
- Hot Tub Time Machine (2010)
- Wind Chill (2007)
- The Sisterhood of the Traveling Pants (2005)
- Are We Done Yet? (2004)
- Elf (2003)
- My Boss's Daughter (2003)
- Agent Cody Banks (2003)
- Hope Springs (2003)
- Josie and the Pussycats (2001)
- The Duke (199)
