= The Death and Life of Charlie St. Cloud =

Novel by Ben Sherwood

- First edition (US)
- Author: Ben Sherwood
- Language: English
- Genre: Novel
- Publisher: Bantam Books (US); Picador (UK)
- Publication date: 2004
- Publication place: United States
- Pages: 309
- ISBN: 978-0-330-48890-7
- OCLC: 60649075

The Death and Life of Charlie St. Cloud is a 2004 novel by Ben Sherwood. It was first published by Bantam Books in the United States, and Picador in the United Kingdom. It is a fable about the experiences of a man named Charlie St. Cloud, who is resuscitated following a car accident that kills his brother.

== Synopsis ==
Charlie St. Cloud (age 15), and Sam (age 12), are brothers. When their mom leaves Charlie to babysit Sam, they decide to go to watch a 1991 Red Sox baseball game in Boston against the New York Yankees with their pet beagle, who is named Oscar. They steal their neighbor's Ford Country Squire to get there.

As they cross the General Edward's Bridge on the Saugus River after the game, Charlie decides to take a look at the Moon, to see if Sam was right that the Moon was larger that night. This means that Charlie does not see an 18-wheeler coming their way. The impact sends the brothers and Oscar tumbling two full rotations down the road. Oscar is crushed by the force of the impact.

Both boys die and find themselves close to the cemetery in Marblehead, the town where they live. Sam is scared, and Charlie makes a promise that they will never abandon each other. However, Charlie gets resuscitated in an ambulance by a religious paramedic, Florio Ferrente, and carries on living.

Thirteen years later, Charlie works at the Waterside cemetery as a spirit medium. Every evening at dusk he goes to a nearby forest where he plays with Sam's ghost. Tess Carroll is a woman who wants to travel around the world in a yacht. A week before her departure, she directs her yacht into a storm to test it, not listening to her captain. The storm sucks Tess into it, and the ship flips over, leaving her hanging onto it upside down.

Tess appears at the cemetery where her father is buried. She hears a loud clanging noise, which is Charlie scaring away the geese by banging trash can covers together. They talk, and Charlie ends up asking Tess to come over for dinner that night. The next day, while taking a walk with her dog, Tess realizes that people ignore her when her dog comes off his leash, and nobody hears her. While at lunch together, three days later, an officer comes in to the coffee shop and states that Tess's boat has gone missing and hasn't been found. Charlie is shocked at the thought that Tess could be dead.

In the meantime, every boater in town, including Charlie, explores the harbor to look for Tess's body. Charlie questions his sanity. Everyone gives up the search, but Charlie realizes that there is one place he has to look. With Sam's help, he finds Tess's body. Tess is transported to a hospital where the doctors stabilize her in a deep coma.

A few months later, Charlie decides to quit his job and move on, leaving Sam, now 25 years old. Charlie becomes a paramedic. During his last visit at the hospital Tess wakes up. Charlie remembers how they met, and tells her the story of how they met and fell in love at the Cemetery.

The afterword of the novel is narrated by the ghost of Florio Ferrante, the paramedic who saved Charlie's life. He reveals that Tess and Charlie fall in love again, and eventually marry and have two sons.

== Film adaptation ==
A film adaptation starring Zac Efron, Amanda Crew and Charlie Tahan began production in 2009. Kim Basinger played Charlie and Sam's mother. The film was produced by Marc Platt and directed by Burr Steers.
