= Kuki Gallmann =

Italian-born Kenyan author

- Born: 1 June 1943 (age 83); Treviso, Italy
- Occupations: Writer, environmentalist
- Years active: 1972–present
- Spouse: Paolo Gallmann
- Children: Emanuele, Sveva

Kuki Gallmann (Italian pronunciation: [ˈkuːki ˈɡalman]) (born Maria Boccazzi - 1 June 1943) is an Italian-born Kenyan national, best-selling author, poet, environmental activist, and conservationist.

== Biography ==
The daughter of Italian climber and writer Cino Boccazzi, in 1972 she moved to Kenya with her husband Paolo and son Emanuele. They acquired Ol ari Nyiro, a 98,000 acres (400 km^{2}) cattle ranch in Western Laikipia, in Kenya's Great Rift Valley which she would later transform into a conservation park. Both her husband and son died in accidents within a few years.

Kuki decided to stay in Kenya and to work toward ecological conservation in the early '80s, becoming a Kenyan citizen. As a living memorial to Paolo and Emanuele, she established the Gallmann Memorial Foundation (GMF), which promotes the coexistence of people and nature in Africa and is active in education, biodiversity research, habitat protection, reforestation, community service, peace and reconciliation, poverty alleviation and public health. GMF promotes the environmental education of Kenyan students. She dedicated Ol ari Nyiro to this ideal, converting it into the Laikipia Nature Conservancy.

Gallmann has published five books, all global best-sellers. The first, her autobiography I Dreamed of Africa, became a feature film starring Kim Basinger and has been published in 24 countries and translated into 21 languages. Her other books are: African Nights, Il Colore del Vento, Night of the Lions, and Elefanti in Giardino.

== Humanitarian and environmental work ==
To bring attention to major environmental topics through art, in 2006 she founded the Great Rift Valley Trust together with her daughter Sveva and other Kenyan personalities. The Trust invites artists to create original fusion art with Kenyan 'slum' artists at the Laikipia Nature Conservancy. The Trust also co-produces the Laikipia Highlands Games, sports for peace, and the Earth Festival to help the environment.

In 2008, after Kenya's post-election violence, she founded the Laikipia Highlands Games (Sport for Peace) to put together, through peaceful but challenging competition of sports, youth across the ethnic, tribal and political divide. The LHG won for Kenya the 2009 Event of Year World Award by the Peace and Sport Foundation in Monaco. The LHG promotes peace through sports amongst previously warring tribes.

In 2010 she founded Prayers for the Earth, to involve local tribal elders and youth to recapture the traditional respect for the environment on which their livelihood depends, and reconnect to the Earth through traditional worship.

In 2011, with her daughter, she acquired and donated 300 acres for a model community project called "Land of Hope" in Laikipia West, which aims to benefit impoverished communities of the area. With support from Maisha Marefu, an Italian Onlus, the project was brought to life: a vocational centre for women and youth, a nursery school and feeding programme, a dispensary, and a high altitude athletics training centre are part of the scheme. This last athletics centre, in partnership with Martin Keino, of Keino Sports Marketing, was completed in 2013.

Sveva, her daughter, holds an MSc in Human Sciences from New College, Oxford and coordinates the award-winning 4 Generations Project, an educational scheme to proactively protect local endangered cultures, by bridging the inter-generational gap. Sveva is also leading several art projects and community projects amongst local tribes to promote peace and improve their living standards.

Despite these circumstances, Kuki succeeded in maintaining Ol Ari Nyiro as a largely untainted reserve of scientific and cultural value. This is witnessed by the recognition of several important accreditations to Ol Ari Nyiro, including being recognized as an “Eastern Afromontane Biodiversity Hotspot”, as one of UNEP World Designated Protected Areas (WDPA), and being officially declared an Important Bird Area (IBA) an area recognized as being a globally important habitat for the conservation of birds populations, and as a KEY BIODIVERSITY AREA (KBA number 064) through Nature Kenya and Birdlife International, a status recognized by the IUCN with the following definition: "Key biodiversity areas are places of international importance for the conservation of biodiversity through protected areas and other governance mechanisms." Additionally, since 2015 Ol Ari Nyiro is part of the Kenya Wildlife Conservancies Association (KWCA 087). Not only is the Conservancy an area of outstanding natural beauty, but also, as a result of the protection that has benefited for over forty years under Kuki's guardianship, the natural springs were preserved and Ol Ari Nyiro now serves as the Water Tower for the Great Rift Valley Lakes. The Mukutan Gorge was defined by Professor Truman Young as “the most varied botanically non forested area in East Africa”

== Gallmann Memorial Foundation ==
Gallman transformed Ol ari Nyiro into a Nature Conservancy (LNC) managed holistically after selling the livestock. Due to relentless protection, Laikipia Nature Conservancy is a biodiversity oasis that supports and protects a variety of animals, forest area, endangered species such as elephants, cheetahs, over 470 species of birds, and rare, endemic plants and insects, in addition to archaeological sites.

== Awards ==
=== Recent ===
On 21-9-2019 Kuki Gallmann received the award “Eccellenza Donna Belluno” with the following motivation: “Kuki Gallmann epitomizes the woman who has followed her environmental cause with determination, strength and resilience – an example to those who do not realize the devastating effects of climate change, and the importance -to mitigate it- of conserving the forests and the natural world. Kuki originates from Veneto and since over a generation is a Kenya citizen – world known for her environmental activism. She has dedicated her life to the protection of the biodiversity of Ol Ari Nyiro where she lives, in memory of her late husband and son who both died tragically and are buried there. Thanks to protection Ol Ari Nyiro with its springs and forests with endemic species is the water shed for the Great Rift Valley Lake System UNESCO Heritage site".

=== List ===
- The Order of the Golden Ark by the late HRH Prince Bernhard of the Netherlands, The Netherlands 1991
- The American Association for Prevention of Cruelty to Animals (ASPCA) Founder Award, New York, US 2002
- Illchamus Elder, Kenya 2005
- The Peruvian Order por la Protección del Ambiente, Peru 2006
- Event of Year World Award by the Peace and Sport Foundation, Monaco 2009
- The Africa Hero Award by the Africa Foundation in New York, US 2010
- The Mimosa d’Oro for Woman of the Year award in Catania, Italy 2012
- Grosso d’Oro Veneziano International Award for Lifetime Conservation Achievement, Italy 2012
- Lifetime Honoris Causa literary Award Gambrinus Mazzotti for Adventure and Exploration, Italy 2017
- Eccellenza Donna Belluno Award, Italy 2019

=== Other functions ===
- World Ambassador for the Migratory Species by the United Nations Convention for Migratory Species (CMS) 2006, United Nations
- Honorary Degree in Human Sciences at the St. Lawrence University, US
- Honorary Warden the Kenya Wildlife Service, Kenya
- Former Trustee, National Museums of Kenya Endowment Fund, Kenya
- Patron District Peace Committee, Kenya

== Other projects ==
=== Co-founder ===
- Laikipia Wildlife Forum (with Gilfrid L. Powys)
- Land of Hope (with daughter Sveva)

=== Projects, buildings and creations ===
- 1987/1990 Ethnobotany research, essential oils, traditional knowledge
- 1988 The Wilderness Education Centre (LWEC). Environmental visits by local children for free
- 1989 The Ivory fire, 18 July Nairobi National park
- 1991/1992 Laikipia elephant monitoring project and elephant corridors (with Zoological society of London, WWF, KWS)
- 1995 The Mukutan Retreat eco-lodge
- 2000 Makena's Hills Center of Origin
- 2003/2006, with UNDP, Lelechwa eco-charcoal project
- 2006 GMF built and donated a maternity Clinic to the Ol Moran Community: Ol Moran Maternity Clinic and Health Centre
- 2007 Woodhenge, amphitheatre for events and prayers
- 2009 during one of the worst droughts in Kenya's history, Kuki Gallmann started an emergency Nursery school, a famine relief and feeding programme, that has so far benefited over 35,000 women and children and is ongoing
- 2010 Ndidika Dispensary
- 2015 Matweku dispensary
- 2015 Kipkumun / East Pokot Nursery school
- 2016 Kamwenje Women Clinic

== Shooting incidents ==
On 23 April 2017, Gallmann was attacked and shot in the stomach by Pokot militia while she was patrolling the Laikipia Nature Conservancy. She was airlifted to Aga Khan Hospital in Nairobi, for further treatment.

On May 13, 2021, Gallmann was shot by armed cattle raiders below the knee while driving on the boundary of the Conservancy. The attack is thought to be accidental, however the raiders went on to steal 265 cattle from a nearby community hours later.
