= Hard Country (film) =

1981 film by David Greene

- Theatrical poster
- Directed by: David Greene
- Screenplay by: Michael Kane
- Story by: Michael Kane; Michael Martin Murphey
- Produced by: Mack Bing; David Greene
- Starring: Jan-Michael Vincent; Kim Basinger; Michael Parks
- Cinematography: Dennis Dalzell
- Edited by: John A. Martinelli
- Music by: Jimmie Haskell; Michael Martin Murphey
- Production company: ITC Entertainment
- Distributed by: Associated Film Distribution
- Release date: May 8, 1981
- Running time: 102 minutes
- Country: United States
- Language: English
- Budget: $5–7 million
- Box office: $534,653

Hard Country is a 1981 American neo-Western romantic drama film directed by David Greene and starring Jan-Michael Vincent, Kim Basinger (in her film debut), and Michael Parks. Written by Michael Kane and Michael Martin Murphey, the film is about a young woman who longs to escape the limitations of life in a small Texas town to pursue her dreams. She is prevented from leaving by her factory worker boyfriend who does not want her to move to the big city. The film features appearances by country music artists Tanya Tucker and Michael Martin Murphey.

== Plot ==
Ambitious young Jodie wants more out of life than the small Texas country town she lives in has to offer. Jodie realizes that in order to pursue her dreams she will have to leave Texas and move to the big city. However, her shiftless factory worker boyfriend Kyle wants to stay in Texas.

== Cast ==
- Jan-Michael Vincent as Kyle
- Kim Basinger as Jodie
- Michael Parks as Royce
- Gailard Sartain as Johnny Bob
- Sierra Pecheur as Mama
- John Chappell as Daddy
- Tanya Tucker as Caroline
- Daryl Hannah as Loretta
- Lewis Van Bergen as Ransom
- Ted Neeley as Wesley
- Curtis Credel as Dale
- Scotch Byerley as Aaron
- Richard Lineback as Larry
- Elise Caitlin as Cowgirl #1
- Danone Camden as Cowgirl #2
- Holly Haber as Cowgirl #3
- Richard Moll as Top Gun
- Ron Spivey as Kicker
- Cisse Cameron as Royce's Wife
- Jack Rader as Planet Foreman
- Laura Madison as Tracy Jo
- Delana Michaels as Telephone Operator
- Teri Foster Brooks as Waitress
- David Haney as Bartender
- Garrie Kelly as Airline Interviewer
- A'leisha Brevard as Snoopy Lady
- Jay Kerr as Deputy
- Cheryl Carter as Woman Customer
- Henry G. Sanders as Man Customer
- Tina Menard as Maid
- Jane Abbott as Woman at Airport
- Dolores Aguirre as Security Guard
- Stephen C. Bradbury as Airport Clerk
- West Buchanan as Airport Agent
- Kirby Buchanan as Airport Police #1
- Mitch Carter as Airport Police #2
- Michael Martin Murphey as Michael
- Mike Hearne as Lead Guitar
- Jody Mephis as Drums
- Mark Webernick as Piano
- Rick Fowler as Bass
- David Ellis Coe as Fidde
- Hank Corwin as Steel Guitar
- Katy Moffatt as Special Guest

Michael Shain as Harry Webb

Mark Garibaldi as Doc Udda

== Production ==
Principal photography of Hard Country began in December 1979 on a budget of approximately $5–7 million. Though set in Texas, the film was largely shot on location in Bakersfield, California, while some second unit photography occurred in Midland, Texas.

== Release ==
Hard Country was released theatrically in Los Angeles on May 8, 1981.

== See also ==
- List of American films of 1981
