= Ben Sherwood =

American writer, journalist, and producer (born 1964)

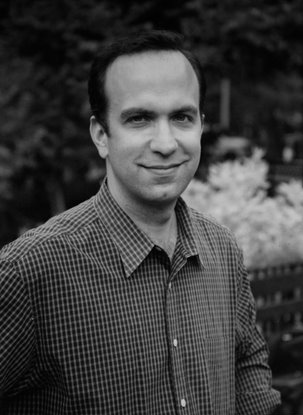
- Sherwood in 2004
- Born: Benjamin Berkley Sherwood; February 12, 1964 (age 62); Los Angeles, California, U.S.
- Education: Harvard University (BA); Magdalen College, Oxford (MSt, MSc)
- Occupations: Author, journalist, entrepreneur
- Title: President, ABC News
- Term: 2010–2015
- Predecessor: David Westin
- Successor: James Goldston
- Spouse: Karen Kehela (m. 2003)
- Children: 2
- Family: Elizabeth Sherwood-Randall (sister)
- Website: Official website

Benjamin Berkley "Ben" Sherwood (born February 12, 1964) is an American writer, journalist, and producer who was the president of Disney-ABC Television Group and ABC News.

== Early life and education ==
Sherwood was born to a wealthy Jewish family in Los Angeles, California. His mother, Dorothy Lipsey Romonek, was a trustee of the California Institute of the Arts. His father, Richard E. Sherwood, was a partner in a Los Angeles law firm, and long time leader of the American Jewish Committee.

In 1981, Sherwood graduated from Harvard-Westlake School), (at the time, known as Harvard School for Boys), an independent university preparatory school in Los Angeles, California. In 1986, he graduated Phi Beta Kappa from Harvard College with an AB degree. From 1986–89, Sherwood was a Rhodes Scholar at Magdalen College, Oxford, and he and his sister, Elizabeth Sherwood-Randall, were the first brother and sister pair of Rhodes scholars. While at Oxford University, Sherwood was a member of the Oxford University Men's Basketball team that placed second at the 1987 B.U.S.F. National Championships.

== Career ==
=== Television journalism ===
From 1989–93, Sherwood was an Associate Producer and a Producer for ABC News' Primetime (then called PrimeTime Live) with hosts Diane Sawyer and Sam Donaldson. During that time, Sherwood was part of the ABC News Team that came under sniper fire in Sarajevo, Bosnia in August 1992.

In 1997, Sherwood joined NBC's Nightly News with Tom Brokaw as a Producer, a Senior Producer, and ultimately the Senior Broadcast Producer, where he was present during coverage of the September 11 attacks. Sherwood left NBC News in January 2002.

In April 2004, Sherwood was the Executive Producer of the ABC's Good Morning America, and on December 3, 2010, Sherwood was appointed President of ABC News in New York.

In January 2015, Sherwood was named President of Disney-ABC Television Group, and Co-Chairman of Disney Media Networks. Following the Disney acquisition of Fox in March 2019, Sherwood departed the company.

=== Writing ===
Sherwood’s non-fiction work has been published in The New York Times, The Washington Post, Los Angeles Times, Newsweek, Parade Magazine, and O Magazine. In 1996, Sherwood wrote his first novel, Red Mercury, published under the pseudonym Max Barclay by Dove Books. The story involves a nuclear terror threat at the Summer Olympic Games in Atlanta, Georgia. President Bill Clinton reportedly "devoured" the book before traveling to Atlanta to attend the Olympics.

In 2000, while working at NBC Nightly News, Sherwood wrote a novel called The Man Who Ate The 747, published by Bantam Books. The tragicomic tale tells the story of an investigator for a fictional Guinness Book of Records who travels to Superior, Nebraska to authenticate a record attempt involving a man eating a Boeing 747. The record keeper meets an introverted and misguided Nebraska farmer who is ingesting the 747 by grinding parts of the plane into gritty dust. By consuming the plane, the farmer hopes to prove the size and scope of his love for a woman who lives in the small town.

In 2004, Sherwood published The Death and Life of Charlie St. Cloud, which follows a young man's journey between the worlds of life and death, and explores his bonds with loved ones in both. The Death and Life of Charlie St. Cloud was made into a major motion picture starring Zac Efron, directed by Burr Steers, produced by Marc E. Platt and released from Universal Pictures on July 30, 2010 under the new title Charlie St. Cloud.

In January 2009, his first non-fiction book, The Survivors Club: The Secrets and Science that Could Save Your Life, was published by Grand Central Publishing, an imprint of Hachette Book Group. The Survivors Club explores human survival in all its forms. The book became a New York Times bestseller and has been published in more than 15 languages.

=== Internet entrepreneur ===
In January 2009, expanding upon the themes of his most recent book, Sherwood launched a website called www.TheSurvivorsClub.org, an online resource center and support network for people facing all manners of adversity.

The Survivors Club website is a social enterprise dedicated to helping people survive and thrive in the face of every kind of adversity including health, financial, family, and extreme challenges. In August 2010, the website re-launched as part of the Hearst Digital Network, a division of the Hearst Corporation.

== Personal life ==
In 2003, Sherwood married Karen Lisa Kehela in a Jewish ceremony in Beverly Hills, California. Kehela is the Co-Chair of Imagine Films, a division of film and television production company Imagine Entertainment. They have two sons.

Sherwood is fluent in French, Chinese, and Russian.

=== Community activities ===
Sherwood is a member of the Board of Directors of City Year (Los Angeles), California, and a member of the Advisory Board of the Center for Public Integrity in Washington, D.C. He is also a member of the Council on Foreign Relations in New York.

== Works ==
=== Novels ===
- Red Mercury (1996), as Max Barclay
- The Man Who Ate The 747 (2000)
- Ponzi's Last Swindle (2003)
- The Death and Life of Charlie St. Cloud (2004)

=== Non-fiction ===
- The Survivors Club: The Secrets and Science That Could Save Your Life (2009), self-help

== Adaptations ==
- Charlie St. Cloud (2010), film directed by Burr Steers, based on novel The Death and Life of Charlie St. Cloud
