= Katie: Portrait of a Centerfold =

- Genre: Drama
- Written by: Nancy Audley
- Directed by: Robert Greenwald
- Starring: Kim Basinger
- Music by: Charles Bernstein
- Country of origin: United States
- Original language: English

Production
- Executive producer: Frank von Zerneck
- Producer: Robert Greenwald
- Cinematography: Donald M. Morgan
- Editor: Gary Griffin
- Running time: 98 mins
- Production companies: Moonlight Productions; Warner Bros. Television

Original release
- Network: NBC
- Release: October 23, 1978

Katie: Portrait of a Centerfold is a 1978 American television film about Katie McEvera, a Texas beauty queen, seeking Hollywood stardom, who learns the realities of the business after attending an unethical modeling school.

== Cast ==
- Kim Basinger as Katie McEvera
- Vivian Blaine as Marietta Cutler
- Fabian as Emcee
- Tab Hunter as Elliot Bender
- Don Johnson as Gunther
- Virginia Kaiser as Deborah Pintoff
- Dorothy Malone as Myrtle Cutler
- Nan Martin as Aunt Isabel
- Melanie Mayron as Madelaine
- Terri Nunn as Cindy Holland
- Don Stroud as Sullie Toulours
- Glynn Turman as Preston de Cordiva
- Kristine DeBell as Sally South
