= I Dreamed of Africa =

2000 film

- Theatrical release poster
- Directed by: Hugh Hudson
- Screenplay by: Paula Milne; Susan Shiliday
- Based on: I Dreamed of Africa; 1991 novel by Kuki Gallmann
- Produced by: Stanley R. Jaffe; Allyn Stewart
- Starring: Kim Basinger; Vincent Perez; Eva Marie Saint; Liam Aiken
- Cinematography: Bernard Lutic
- Edited by: Scott Thomas
- Music by: Maurice Jarre
- Production company: Columbia Pictures
- Distributed by: Sony Pictures Releasing
- Release date: May 5, 2000
- Running time: 114 minutes
- Country: United States
- Language: English
- Budget: $50 million
- Box office: $14.4 million

I Dreamed of Africa is a 2000 American biographical-drama film directed by Hugh Hudson, starring Kim Basinger. It also stars Vincent Perez, Eva Marie Saint, Garrett Strommen, Liam Aiken and Daniel Craig. It is based on the autobiographical novel I Dreamed of Africa by Kuki Gallmann, an Italian writer who moved to Kenya and became involved in conservation. It was screened in the Un Certain Regard section at the 2000 Cannes Film Festival. This film was both a commercial and critical failure.

== Synopsis ==
In Italy 1972, Kuki Boccazzi, a divorced Italian socialite, changes her life after surviving a car crash. She marries Paolo Gallmann, a man she does not know well, and moves with him and her young son Emanuele Pirri to Kenya, where they start a ranch. She faces many problems, both physical and emotional, that will test her.

== Cast ==
- Kim Basinger as Kuki Gallmann
- Vincent Perez as Paolo Gallmann
- Eva Marie Saint as Franca
- Daniel Craig as Declan Fielding
- Liam Aiken as Emanuele Pirri-Gallmann (age 7)
  - Garrett Strommen as Emanuele Pirri-Gallmann (age 17)
- Lance Reddick as Simon
- Connie Chiume as Wanjiku
- Shannon Esra as Siri

== Soundtrack ==
This includes "Voi che sapete", sung by Brigitte Fassbaender (mezzo-soprano), with the Vienna Philharmonic Orchestra, István Kertész conducting, from Act 2 of the opera Le nozze di Figaro (The Marriage of Figaro), K. 492, composed by Wolfgang Amadeus Mozart. This was one of the last films scored by acclaimed composer Maurice Jarre.

== Reception ==
The film was not received well despite praise for Kim Basinger's performance. It has a 10% rating on Rotten Tomatoes, based on 102 reviews. The site's critical consensus reads: "The straightforward retelling of Kuki Gallmann's life in Africa neither moves nor entertains the viewer." Metacritic, which uses a weighted average, assigned the film a score of 33 out of 100, based on 30 critics, indicating "generally unfavorable" reviews.

Basinger earned a nomination for the Golden Raspberry Award for Worst Actress (also for Bless the Child) at the 21st Golden Raspberry Awards.

The film was also a huge financial flop; its budget was $50 million, and the worldwide gross was less than $15 million.
