= Cellular (film) =

2004 American film directed by David Ellis

- Theatrical release poster
- Directed by: David R. Ellis
- Screenplay by: Chris Morgan
- Story by: Larry Cohen
- Produced by: Dean Devlin; Lauren Lloyd
- Starring: Kim Basinger; Chris Evans; Jason Statham; Eric Christian Olsen; Noah Emmerich; William H. Macy
- Cinematography: Gary Capo
- Edited by: Eric Sears
- Music by: John Ottman
- Production company: Electric Entertainment
- Distributed by: New Line Cinema
- Release date: September 10, 2004
- Running time: 94 minutes
- Country: United States
- Language: English
- Budget: $25 million
- Box office: $57.7 million

Cellular is a 2004 American action thriller film directed by David R. Ellis. The film stars Kim Basinger, Chris Evans, Jason Statham, William H. Macy with Noah Emmerich, Richard Burgi, Valerie Cruz and Jessica Biel. The screenplay was written by Chris Morgan, based on a story by Larry Cohen.

A young man named Ryan receives a desperate call from a stranger, science teacher Jessica Martin, when her phone line randomly connects to his. Jessica has been kidnapped by home invaders and Ryan must maintain the connection for as long as possible to find and save her, while discovering who the kidnappers are and why they're holding her.

The film was released by New Line Cinema on September 10, 2004. It received mixed reviews from critics and grossed $57.7 million.

== Plot ==
Science teacher Jessica Martin lives with her husband Craig and son Ricky. One morning, intruders break into their home, killing their housekeeper and kidnapping Jessica. They lock her in an attic, smashing the landline. She wires the broken phone to try to connect to someone.

She manages to connect to Ryan, a laid-back, immature young man hanging with friends at Santa Monica Pier. Although believing Jessica is pranking him, he goes to the police. When a fight erupts at the station, he is sent upstairs to report the kidnapping. However, worsening cell service on the way up forces him to stop so he doesn't lose Jessica on the call.

Lead kidnapper Ethan Greer demands Jessica reveal Craig's location. When she refuses, he goes after Ricky. Overhearing Ethan threatening Jessica, Ryan realises the kidnapping is real, which sobers him. He is unable to prevent Ricky's abduction. Due to low phone battery, he uses a gun from a security officer's car to skip the store line and quickly obtain a phone charger.

Investigating Ryan's claim, Officer Mooney visits Jessica's home. One of Ethan's accomplices, Dana Bayback, poses as Jessica. When Ethan returns with Ricky, Jessica helplessly reveals that Craig is at an LAX bar.

A cross-connection between cell lines forces Ryan to steal a nearby lawyer's car and cell to not lose Jessica. Ryan plants the gun on one of the kidnappers at LAX to alert security and is shocked to learn the kidnappers are LAPD officers. They nab Craig while Ryan loses the lawyer's car to the impound. Mooney sees Ryan on the TV news for the car jacking, calls Jessica's home again, and realizes he was deceived by Dana.

The kidnappers take Craig to his bank safe deposit box for a video camera bag, which Ryan intercepts. While Ethan chases him, the lawyer's cellphone shatters and Ryan loses connection with Jessica. He watches the reason for Jessica and Craig's predicament: an incriminating video on Craig's camera of LAPD detectives Ethan, Mad Dog, Dimitri, Dana, Deason, and Mooney's colleague Jack Tanner robbing and murdering two drug dealers.

Stealing the lawyer's car again from the impound, Ryan finds his own cell that he'd dropped in the seat. Mooney returns to the Martins' and kills Bayback in self-defense. Mad Dog discovers Jessica has been using the landline and tries to kill her. She nicks his brachial artery, so he swiftly bleeds out, though Ethan stops Jessica and Ricky from escaping. Ryan contacts Ethan, offering the videotape in exchange for the Martins at Santa Monica Pier.

There, a disguised Ryan demands the Martins are freed before surrendering the videotape, but his ex-girlfriend Chloe inadvertently reveals him. Tanner sends Mooney away with Dimitri and takes Ryan hostage. Ethan destroys the videotape, then radios Deason to kill the Martins at the safe house. Mooney overhears and realizes the truth. He overpowers Dimitri while Ryan escapes to a boathouse. He knocks Tanner out, but Ethan overpowers him before Mooney appears. After a brief altercation, Mooney is able to shoot Ethan dead with Ryan's help.

Jessica strangles Deason with her handcuffs in the van, then frees Craig and Ricky; he attempts to kill them. Ryan saves them by knocking Deason out. Tanner's part in the scheme is exposed, as Ryan had copied the video on his cell. Jessica finally meets Ryan in person, the man who risked his life to save her family, and thanks him, asking if she can do anything for him. Ryan jokingly asks her never to call him again.

== Cast ==
- Chris Evans as Ryan
- Kim Basinger as Jessica Martin
- Jason Statham as Detective Ethan Greer
- William H. Macy as Sergeant Robert “Bob” Mooney
- Noah Emmerich as Detective Jack Tanner
- Richard Burgi as Craig Martin
- Valerie Cruz as Detective Dana Bayback
- Jessica Biel as Chloe
- Eric Christian Olsen as Chad
- Adam Taylor Gordon as Ricky Martin
- Caroline Aaron as Marilyn Mooney
- Matt McColm as Detective Deason
- Eric Etebari as Detective Dimitri
- Brendan Kelly as Detective Mad Dog

== Production ==
Larry Cohen, screenwriter of the 2002 thriller film Phone Booth, conceived of Cellular while working for Sony Pictures. Cohen's original screenplay mimicked Phone Booth in its theme of a "narcissistically obsessed society" enamored with cell phones. Its story followed a 30- or 40-year-old man named Theo Novak who obtains a call from a woman named Lenore, who tells him that she and her husband have been abducted in a safehouse by a group of bank robbers. It is then revealed that Novak is an art thief who becomes wracked with guilt after unsuccessfully rescuing a friend from committing suicide in the past; he agrees to make a detour from a criminal undertaking and rescue Lenore. During the rescue Novak is unsuccessful, but later discovers a conspiracy involving Lenore and her accomplices over another crime they are involved with—ultimately, Novak gains the upper hand, killing Lenore and her accomplices and obtains their loot in the process, which leaves him therefore a wealthy man.

Sony Pictures' then Vice President Lauren Lloyd was drawn to Cohen's script and thought of pitching it to fellow executives, but was unsuccessful in doing so. She then left Sony to produce the project independently. Lloyd sent the script to her colleague producer Dean Devlin and pledged to develop it together. Aiming for a story straightforward and devoid of bitterness and cynicism present in Cohen's version, the pair hired screenwriter Chris Morgan. Morgan had been passionate about crafting "a story about how an everyday person can become heroic when faced with a certain set of trying circumstances", and he incorporated that in Cellular. In an attempt to segue the script's predominant action and thriller elements with situational comedy, as well as appeal to young audiences, Morgan took inspiration from the comical attributes of the fictional character Indiana Jones:

I'm a big fan of situational humor and I feel like comedy plays best when it's the right thing at the right time and not just somebody trying to make a joke. For example, in Raiders of the Lost Ark when Indiana Jones is faced with fighting the swordsman and he just pulls out a gun and shoots him. That’s not really a joke, but it got a huge laugh. That's the kind of humor we tried to work.

== Music ==
Cellular: Original Motion Picture Soundtrack

Soundtrack album by John Ottman
- Released: October 5, 2004
- Genres: Electronic, Stage & Screen
- Length: 56:52
- Label: La-La Land Records LLLCD 1025

John Ottman chronology
Gothika (2003)	Cellular: Original Motion Picture Soundtrack (2004)	Lonely Place (2004)

The soundtrack for the movie was composed by John Ottman and released on October 5, 2004, via La-La Land Records label.

=== Track listing ===
No.	Title	Length
1.	"Opening / Abduction"	3:09
2.	"Going Shopping"	3:35
3.	"Making A Connection"	2:20
4.	"The Bait"	3:08
5.	"Mooney's Curious"	1:22
6.	"Freeing Ricky"	4:05
7.	"School's Out"	4:23
8.	"We're Going To Die"	2:11
9.	"LAX"	4:21
10.	"Epiphany / The Bank"	4:04
11.	"The Pier"	4:10
12.	"Lost Connection / Dirty Cops"	4:44
13.	"Hot Porsche / Simply Biology"	3:37
14.	"Police Station"	4:01
15.	"Fake Out"	2:12
16.	"Shoot Out"	5:42

== Release ==
=== Home media ===
Cellular was released on VHS and DVD on January 18, 2005. The film was later released on Blu-ray on July 17, 2012, by New Line Home Entertainment.

== Reception ==
=== Box office ===
Cellular grossed $32 million in the U.S. and Canada and $25.7 million in international markets, for a total of $57.7 million worldwide.

=== Critical response ===
On review aggregator website Rotten Tomatoes, 56% of 149 surveyed critics gave the film a positive review. The site's critics consensus reads: "Though it's gimmicky and occasionally feels like a high-end cell phone ad, Cellular is also an energetic and twisty thriller." Metacritic, another review aggregator, gave the film a score of 60 out of 100 based on 29 critics, indicating "mixed or averaged reviews". Audiences polled by CinemaScore gave the film an average grade of "B+" on an A+ to F scale.

Entertainment Weekly called the film "pure chase-thriller excitement", and Claudia Puig of USA Today called it a "well-paced action film in the vein of Speed". Roger Ebert rated it three and half stars and called it "one of the year's best thrillers".

Kim Basinger was nominated for Best Supporting Actress at the 31st Saturn Awards.

== Remakes ==
The 2007 Malayalam movie Hello draws the plot of kidnap and phone call to a random number from Cellular.

The 2007 Bollywood film Speed is an adaption of Cellular directed by Vikram Bhatt. The film stars Zayed Khan, Sanjay Suri, Urmila Matondkar, Aftab Shivdasani and Aashish Chaudhary.

In 2008, a Hong Kong remake of the film entitled Connected was co-written, produced and directed by Benny Chan. The film stars Louis Koo, Barbie Hsu, Nick Cheung and Liu Ye.

== Novelization ==
A novelization of the film was written by Pat Cadigan and released in October 2004 by Black Flame.
