= Nadine (1987 film) =

1987 film by Robert Benton

- Theatrical release poster by Drew Struzan
- Directed by: Robert Benton
- Written by: Robert Benton
- Produced by: Arlene Donovan
- Starring: Jeff Bridges; Kim Basinger; Rip Torn
- Cinematography: Néstor Almendros
- Edited by: Sam O'Steen
- Music by: Howard Shore
- Production company: ML Delphi Premier Productions
- Distributed by: TriStar Pictures
- Release date: August 7, 1987
- Running time: 83 minutes
- Country: United States
- Language: English
- Budget: $12 million
- Box office: $5.6 million

Nadine is a 1987 American crime comedy film written and directed by Robert Benton and starring Jeff Bridges and Kim Basinger.

== Plot ==
It's 1954 in Austin, Texas, and a slightly pregnant Nadine Hightower is in a lot of trouble. She's gone to sleazy photographer Raymond Escobar's studio to reclaim some photos from him because they were "lots more artistic than I bargained for." Escobar assures her that he knows Hugh Hefner and she will certainly make it to the top. But Nadine has second thoughts, as she wants her photos, and when she goes back to the studio to retrieve them, gets caught up in the middle of a murder scene. She grabs an envelope with her name on it and hightails it out of there.

Unfortunately, she gets the wrong pictures. She has stolen plans for a new highway development that ends up in the hands of her estranged husband Vernon, a handsome, wise-mouthed bum who owns a bar called the Blue Bonnet which no one goes to and that's not the worst of it. He's fooling around with a former Pecan Queen, who works for the Lone Star Brewing company. He sees a way to make a bundle of money in all this.

Shady real estate kingpin Buford Pope wants the plans back and will stop at nothing to get them. The couple is soon on the run not only from Buford but from police who believe they've killed Escobar. All this time, Nadine and Vernon want a divorce, and Nadine hasn't told Vernon she's pregnant with his baby.

== Cast ==
- Jeff Bridges as Vernon Hightower
- Kim Basinger as Nadine Hightower
- Rip Torn as Buford Pope
- Gwen Verdon as Vera
- Glenne Headly as Renée Lomax
- Jay Patterson as Dwight Estes
- Jerry Stiller as Raymond Escobar

== Production ==
The film was written specifically for Kim Basinger. Shooting began on September 30, 1986 in Austin, Texas and further shooting took place in San Antonio. The framed picture of Jeff Bridges in a uniform in the film is taken from The Last Picture Show (1971). Much of the soundtrack was provided by the country group Sweethearts of the Rodeo.

== Release ==
=== Critical reception ===
Rotten Tomatoes gives Nadine a rating of 50% from 12 reviews.

Roger Ebert gave the film 2 and a half stars (out of four) and called it "a curiously flat, unfinished, low-energy comedy" while praising the performances of the leads. Sheila Benson of the Los Angeles Times called the film "a deeply felt tribute to Texas womanhood" while conceding it was "pretty much the light beer of movies."

=== Home media ===
The film was released on VHS with a 4:3 ratio by CBS/FOX Video in 1988, and on DVD with a 1.85:1 ratio by Sony Pictures Home Entertainment on July 5, 2005.
