= Kim Basinger =

American actress (born 1953)

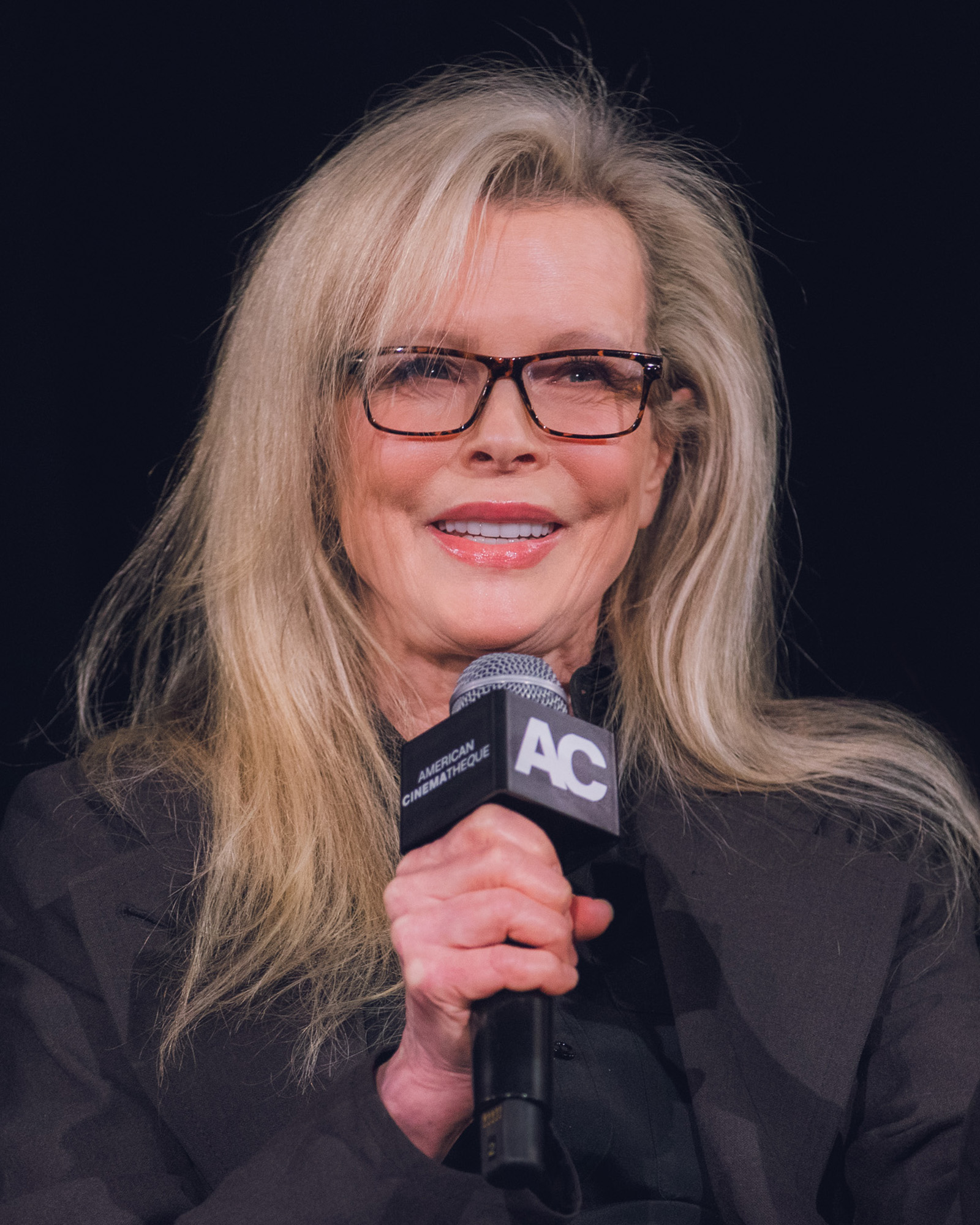
- Basinger in 2026
- Born: Kimila Ann Basinger; December 8, 1953 (age 72); Athens, Georgia, U.S.
- Occupations: Actress; singer
- Years active: 1976–present
- Works: Full list
- Spouses: Ron Snyder (m. 1980; div. 1989) Alec Baldwin (m. 1993; div. 2002)
- Partner: Mitch Stone (2014–present)
- Children: Ireland Baldwin
- Awards: Full list

Kimila Ann Basinger (/ˈbeɪsɪŋər/ BAY-sing-ər; born December 8, 1953) is an American actress. She has garnered acclaim for her work in film, for which she has received various accolades including an Academy Award, a Golden Globe Award, a Screen Actors Guild Award, and a star on the Hollywood Walk of Fame. Initially a TV starlet, she shot to fame as a Bond girl in 1983 and enjoyed a long heyday over the next two decades.

Basinger began her career as a model and switched to acting in 1976. She appeared in several television productions, including a remake of From Here to Eternity (1979), before making her feature debut in the rural drama Hard Country (1981). Basinger first gained widespread attention for her performance of Domino Petachi in the James Bond entry Never Say Never Again (1983). She went on to receive a Golden Globe nomination for her role in The Natural (1984), starred in the erotic drama 9½ Weeks (1986), and played Vicki Vale in Tim Burton's Batman (1989), which remains the highest-grossing film of her career. For her femme fatale portrayal in L.A. Confidential (1997), Basinger won the Academy Award for Best Supporting Actress.

Her other films include No Mercy (1986), Blind Date (1987), My Stepmother Is an Alien (1988), Cool World (1992), The Real McCoy (1993), I Dreamed of Africa (2000), 8 Mile (2002), The Door in the Floor (2004), Cellular (2004), The Sentinel (2006), The Burning Plain (2009), Grudge Match (2013), and Fifty Shades Darker (2017).

Divorced from makeup artist Ron Snyder and actor Alec Baldwin, Basinger cohabitates with her longtime hairdresser, Mitch Stone. She had a high-profile relationship between marriages with musician Prince, with whom she recorded an album, Hollywood Affair, and is the mother of social media influencer Ireland Baldwin from her marriage to Baldwin.

== Early life and modeling ==
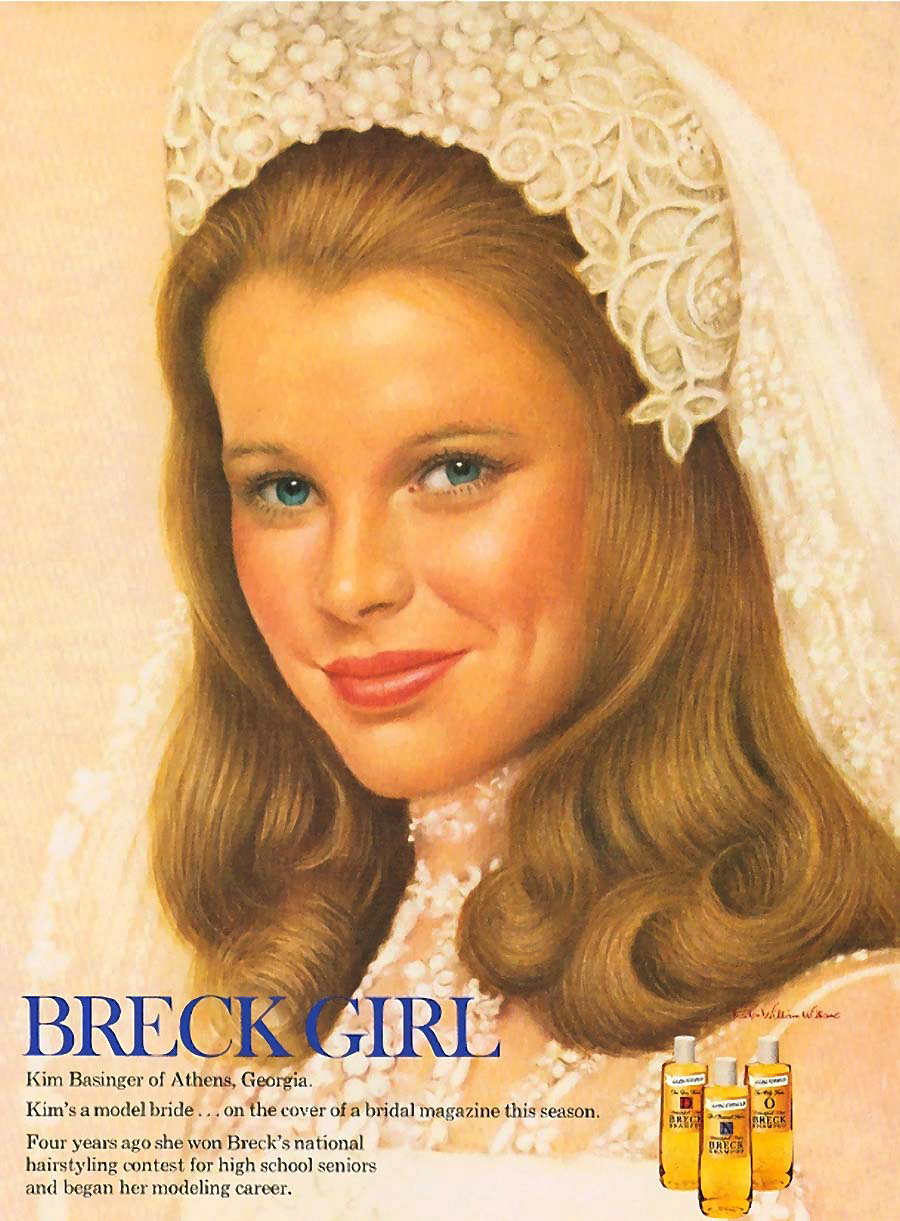
Basinger modelling for Breck Shampoo in 1974

Basinger was born in Athens, Georgia, on December 8, 1953. Her mother, Ann Lee (née Cordell; 1925–2017), was a model, actress and swimmer who appeared in several Esther Williams films. Her father, Donald Wade Basinger (1923–2016), was a big band musician and loan manager; as a U.S. Army soldier, he landed in Normandy on D-Day. The middle of five children, she has two older brothers, Skip (b. 1950) and Mick (b. 1951), and two younger sisters, Barbara (b. 1956) and Ashley (b. 1959). Basinger's ancestry includes English, German, and Ulster Scots. She was raised a Methodist. Basinger has described herself as extremely shy, which had a major effect on her during her childhood and young adulthood. She has said that her shyness was so extreme that she would faint if asked to speak in class.

Basinger studied ballet from about age three to her mid-teens. By her mid-teens, she grew in confidence and successfully auditioned for the school cheerleading team. At 17, she entered America's Junior Miss Scholarship Pageant, won at the city level and was crowned Athens Junior Miss. While she didn't win at the state level, her beauty was profiled in the national program. She had competed at the state level for the Breck Scholarship and was featured in an ad for Breck in a joint portrait with her mother.

Basinger was offered a modeling contract with the Ford Modeling Agency, but turned it down in favor of singing and acting, and enrolled at the University of Georgia. She soon reconsidered and went to New York to become a Ford model. Despite earning US$1,000 a day, Basinger never enjoyed modeling, saying: "It was very hard to go from one booking to another and always have to deal with the way I looked. I couldn't stand it. I felt myself choking." Basinger has said that even as a model, when others relished looking in the mirror before appearing, she abhorred it and would avoid mirrors out of insecurity. Not long after her Ford deal, Basinger appeared on the cover of magazines. She also appears on the cover of the debut album by the band Survivor. She appeared in hundreds of advertisements throughout the early 1970s, most notably as the Breck Shampoo girl. She alternated between modeling and attending acting classes at the Neighborhood Playhouse, as well as performing in Greenwich Village clubs as a singer. Basinger is an alumna of the William Esper Studio for the performing arts in Manhattan, New York City.

== Career ==
=== Early roles (1976–1982) ===
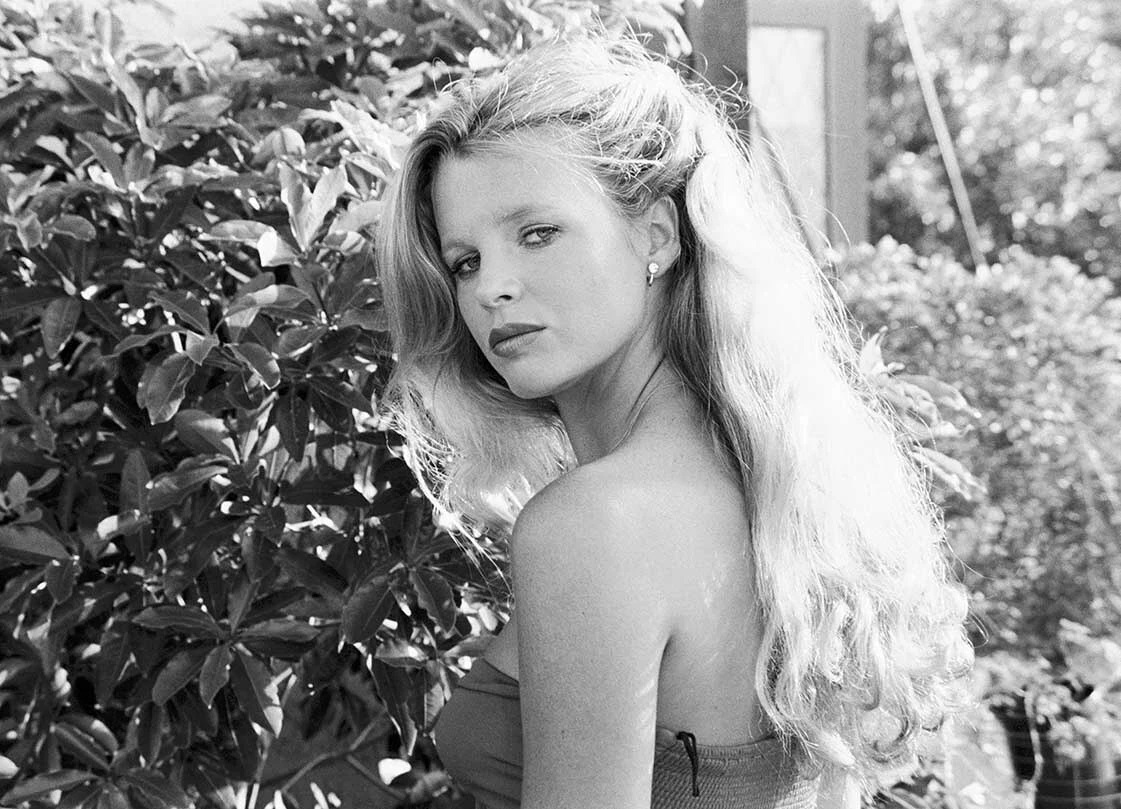
Basinger in Katie: Portrait of a Centerfold (1978)

In 1976, after four years as a cover girl, Basinger quit modeling and moved to Los Angeles to act. She made guest appearances on a few television shows such as McMillan & Wife and Charlie's Angels, turning down a regular role in the latter series that eventually went to Cheryl Ladd. Her first starring role was a made-for-TV movie, Katie: Portrait of a Centerfold (1978), in which she played a small town girl who goes to Hollywood to become an actress and winds up becoming a famous centerfold for a men's magazine. She also had the lead in a short lived TV series Dog and Cat.

In 1979, she co-starred with Natalie Wood, William Devane and Steve Railsback in the miniseries remake of From Here to Eternity, reprising her role as prostitute Lorene Rogers in a 13-episode spinoff that aired in 1980. In 1981, Basinger made her feature debut in the critically well-received but little-seen rural drama Hard Country, which she followed with the Charlton Heston-directed outdoorsy adventure Mother Lode (1982).

=== Worldwide exposure (1983–1989) ===
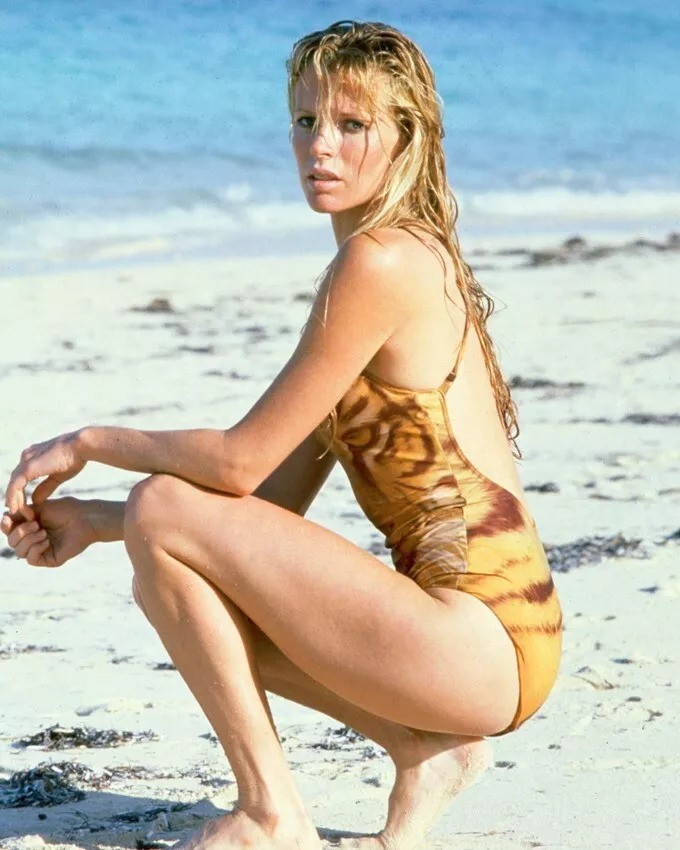
1983 pinup poster of Basinger in a swimsuit from Playboy Enterprises

Her breakthrough role came as Domino Petachi, the Bond girl in Never Say Never Again (1983), where she starred opposite Sean Connery. In his review of the film, Gary Arnold of The Washington Post said Basinger "looks like a voluptuous sibling of Liv Ullmann and has a certain something." Worldwide, Never Say Never Again grossed US$160 million. As part of its promotion, Basinger did a famous nude pictorial for Playboy, which she has said led to good opportunities, such as her role as the romantic interest of a baseball team star in Barry Levinson's The Natural (1984), alongside Robert Redford, for which she earned a Golden Globe nomination for Best Supporting Actress.

Blake Edwards cast her twice in his films; as a beautiful woman married to a Texas millionaire in The Man Who Loved Women (1983), and as an apparently shy woman who goes on a date with a workaholic man in Blind Date (1987). Robert Altman cast Basinger in the role of a woman hiding from her former lover at an old motel in Fool for Love (1985). In 1986, Basinger starred as a New York City art gallery employee who has a brief yet intense affair with a mysterious Wall Street broker, opposite Mickey Rourke, in Adrian Lyne's controversial erotic romantic drama 9½ Weeks. Though the film failed at the North American box office, it performed very well in Europe, especially France, and acquired a large American fanbase on home video and cable. Roger Ebert praised the film, comparing it to Last Tango in Paris, and said Basinger helped "develop an erotic tension [...] that is convincing, complicated and sensual."

Writer-director Robert Benton also cast her in the title role of a slightly pregnant woman in trouble for Nadine (1987). While most of the films Basinger starred in during this period were released to varying degrees of success, they helped to establish her as an actress. With over US$400 million in box office totals, the highest-grossing film of her career thus far is Tim Burton's 1989 film Batman, in which Basinger took on role of photojournalist Vicki Vale, opposite Michael Keaton. Basinger re-wrote the film's third act with producer Jon Peters with whom she was having a behind the scenes affair. The Hollywood Reporter, in its original review, remarked that "the uniqueness and very soul of the film [...] is achieved through the beautifully defined and probing performances of Michael Keaton as Bruce Wayne and Kim Basinger as Vicki Vale".

=== 1990s ===
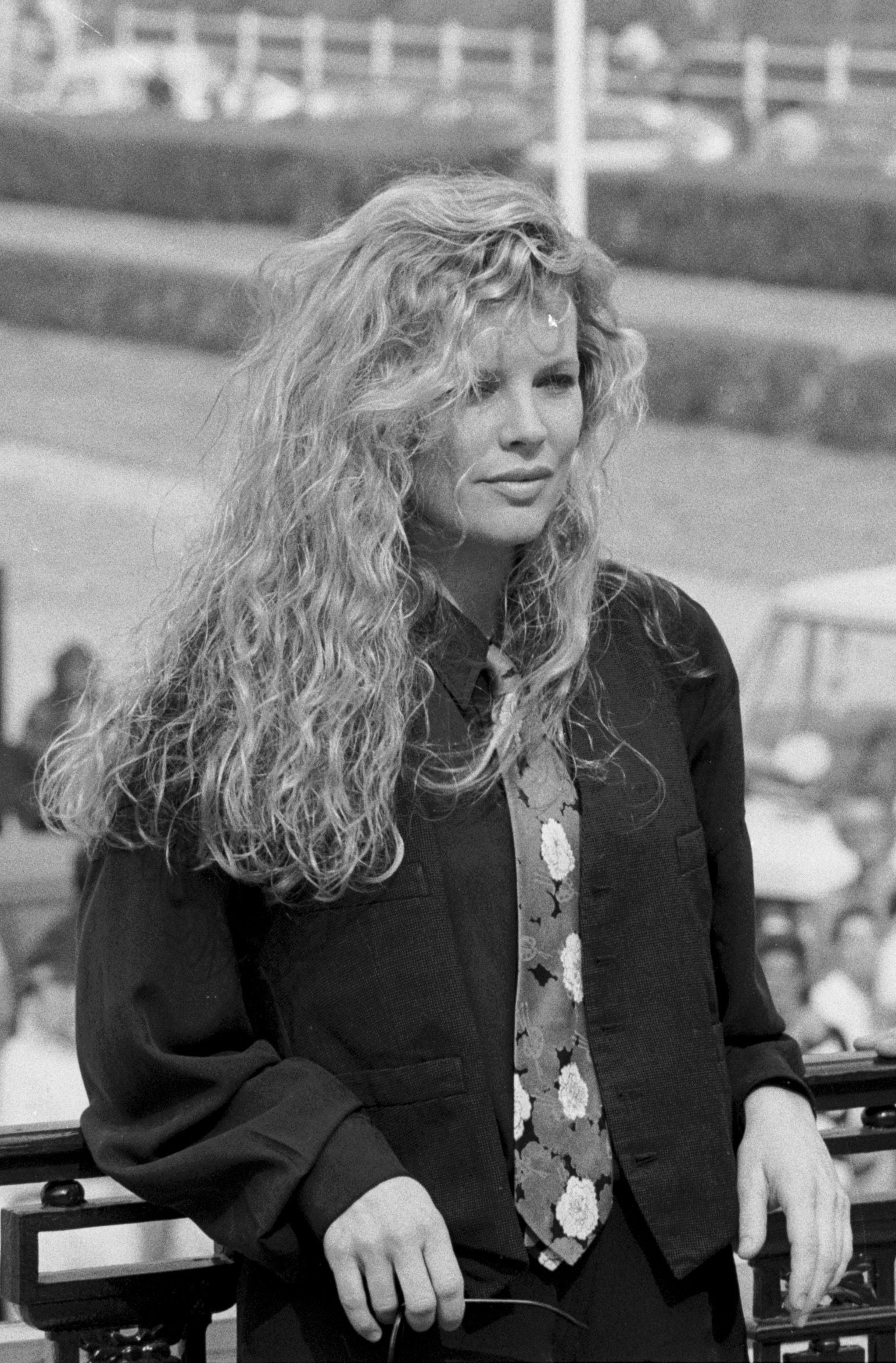
Basinger at the Deauville American Film Festival in 1989

Following the success of Batman, Basinger played a glamorous singer, alongside Alec Baldwin, in the comedy The Marrying Man (1991), and starred with Richard Gere, as a woman romantically involved with her sister's psychiatrist, in the neo-noir Final Analysis (1992). Both films were released to moderate box office returns. In 1992, Basinger was also a guest vocalist on a re-recorded version of Was (Not Was)'s "Shake Your Head", which featured Ozzy Osbourne on vocals, and reached the UK Top 5, and starred in what marked her only voice-acting project to date, the film Cool World, directed by Ralph Bakshi, as a cartoon bombshell who longs to become a real human woman.

In 1993, Basinger took on the roles of a woman recently released from prison in the crime film The Real McCoy, a woman named Honey Hornée in the comedy Wayne's World 2, and was in the music video for Tom Petty and the Heartbreakers' hit single Mary Jane's Last Dance. In 1994, she reunited professionally with Baldwin for the thriller The Getaway, in which she portrayed the wife of a former con, and with director Robert Altman for the comedy Prêt-à-Porter, playing a breathlessly dim-witted cable reporter. Amid financial issues, Basinger went into hiatus from the screen by the mid-1990s.

She made a comeback as the high-class hooker in Curtis Hanson's neo-noir L.A. Confidential (1997), alongside Guy Pearce and Russell Crowe. She initially turned down the film twice, feeling an insecurity at returning to the screen and enjoying motherhood. The Washington Post felt that Basinger "exudes a sort of chaste sultriness", in what Roger Ebert described as "one of the best films of the year". The role earned her an Academy Award for Best Supporting Actress, as well as the Golden Globe Award for Best Supporting Actress – Motion Picture and the Screen Actors Guild Award for Outstanding Performance by a Female Actor in a Supporting Role, and was also nominated for the BAFTA Award for Best Actress in a Leading Role. She holds the distinction of being the only actress who has both posed nude in Playboy and won an Academy Award. In a 2000 interview with Charlie Rose, Basinger said that L.A. Confidential and her next film, I Dreamed of Africa (2000), were the most pleasurable of her career.

=== 2000s ===
In I Dreamed of Africa, Basinger portrayed writer and environmentalist Kuki Gallmann, with Vincent Pérez, whom she called the "most incredible actor she had ever worked with". The film was described as a "passion project" for her, and she told UrbanCinefile that she "cried for hours" when she had to leave Kenya, where filming took place. Budgeted at US$50 million, I Dreamed of Africa got a 10 percent rating on Rotten Tomatoes, and only managed to pull in US$14 million at the worldwide box office.

Curtis Hanson cast her again, this time as the alcoholic mother of an aspiring rapper, in 8 Mile (2002), opposite Eminem and Brittany Murphy. The film appeared on many top ten lists of the year, and in his review, Roger Ebert asserted: "There has been criticism of Kim Basinger, who is said to be too attractive and even glamorous to play [Eminem]'s mother, but [...] Her performance finds the right note somewhere between love and exasperation; it cannot be easy to live with this sullen malcontent, whose face lights up only when he sees his baby sister". 8 Mile was a commercial success, grossing $242.9 million worldwide.

Basinger starred as the wife of a children's book author, with Jeff Bridges and Jon Foster, in The Door in the Floor (2004), a drama with heavy sexual themes adapted from the novel A Widow for One Year by John Irving. The film found a limited audience in theaters, but in his review, Peter Travers of Rolling Stone, felt that "Basinger's haunted beauty burns in the memory" and called it "her finest work".

Basinger next appeared in two crime thrillers—Cellular (2004) and The Sentinel (2006). In Cellular, opposite Chris Evans and Jason Statham, she played a wealthy high school biology teacher taken hostage in her home. Entertainment Weekly considered that "Basinger makes a vividly frightened yet resourceful woman in peril", and the film was a moderate commercial success. In The Sentinel, Basinger portrayed the First Lady of the United States, opposite Michael Douglas, Kiefer Sutherland and Eva Longoria. Despite mixed reviews, the film made US$78.1 million globally. In 2006, Basinger also starred in the Lifetime film The Mermaid Chair, as a married woman who falls in love with a Benedictine monk and experiences a self-awakening.

Basinger then played a mother having extramarital affairs in director Guillermo Arriaga's feature film debut The Burning Plain (2008), a drama narrated in a hyperlink format, opposite Charlize Theron and Jennifer Lawrence. While the film found a limited release in theaters, The Telegraph, in its review, wrote: "Arriaga pulls together the strands of his narrative with great expertise [and] his job is made easier by great performances from three actresses: Theron and Basinger, who both look like racing certs for next year's awards season, and Jennifer Lawrence as Basinger's teenage daughter".

In 2008, Basinger produced and starred in the independent thriller While She Was Out, as a suburban housewife who is forced to fend for herself when she becomes stranded in a desolate forest with four murderous thugs. Despite a very limited release in theaters, L.A. Weekly described that film as a "surprisingly enjoyable female revenge tale" and called Basinger's performance "first-rate". Her next film, The Informers (2009), which was written by Bret Easton Ellis, premiered at the Sundance Film Festival. In it, Basinger starred as the chronically depressed wife of a jaded film executive (played by Billy Bob Thornton).

=== 2010s ===
Basinger played the mother of a young man who made a promise to his deceased brother, with Zac Efron, in the supernatural drama Charlie St. Cloud (2010), based on the 2004 best-selling novel The Death and Life of Charlie St. Cloud by Ben Sherwood.

Basinger returned to Africa in her next film, the 2012 Nigerian drama Black November, about a Niger Delta community's struggle to save their environment, which was being destroyed by excessive oil drilling. As part of an ensemble cast (which included her 9½ Weeks co-star Mickey Rourke), she played the role of a kidnapped reporter. While the film had a significant impact upon its release, The Hollywood Reporter noted: "Don't be fooled by the names of Mickey Rourke and Kim Basinger on the marquee. Despite the tantalizing prospect of a reunion of the stars of a certain '80s-era hit erotic drama, their minor presence is largely extraneous to the proceedings of [this] overwrought and preachy thriller".

Basinger played the role of wife in two 2013 films — the independent drama Third Person, with Liam Neeson and Olivia Wilde, and the sports comedy Grudge Match, with Robert De Niro and Sylvester Stallone. Critic Odie Henderson, describing Basinger in his review for the latter film, remarked that she "looks stunning at 60 and provides the film's sole voice of reason". She subsequently took on the role of mother in the independent drama 4 Minute Mile (2014) as well as the part of a woman who, after a miscarriage, sets out on a dangerous quest to obtain a child in the likewise independent production The 11th Hour (also 2014), which was released for VOD. IndieWire felt that Basinger "does what she can with [The 11th Hour] material, but that's not much". In 2016, she had a brief role, as a crooked high-ranking official in the United States Department of Justice, in the crime comedy The Nice Guys, alongside Russell Crowe and Ryan Gosling.

Basinger played Elena Lincoln, the business partner and former lover of Christian Grey, in the film adaptation of Fifty Shades Darker (2017), the sequel to Fifty Shades of Grey. Dakota Johnson, her co-star, described her as "one of the great people to work with". Despite negative reviews, the film made US$381.4 million globally. Basinger reprised the role in the 2018 sequel, Fifty Shades Freed.

=== 2020s ===
In January 2022, Basinger collaborated with Peter Bogdanovich to create LIT Project 2: Flux, a first of its kind short film made available on the Ethereum blockchain as a non-fungible token. She is a prominent character in the video game Crime Boss: Rockay City (2023). Basinger was cast in the upcoming animated feature Getting Lost in 2026, which is currently in production.

== Personal life ==
=== Marriages and relationships ===
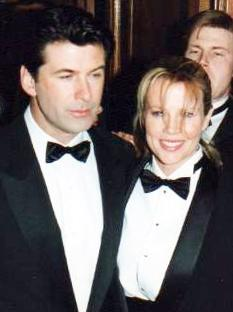
Basinger with Alec Baldwin at the 19th César Awards at the Théâtre du Châtelet in Paris in February 1994

Before she was famous, Basinger dated model Tim Saunders, photographer Dale Robinette and football player Joe Namath.

On October 12, 1980, she married makeup artist Ron Snyder-Britton, whom she met on the film Hard Country. Basinger developed agoraphobia that same year, following a panic attack in a health-food store, and was housebound for six months. Snyder quit his job during the marriage and changed his surname to Britton after Basinger requested he choose "something with a B" so she could keep the same initials when using her married name. The pair divorced just before Christmas 1989, after which Basinger paid him $9,000 monthly alimony for eight years. Britton wrote a memoir titled Longer Than Forever, published in 1998, about their time together and about her affair with Richard Gere, with whom she starred in No Mercy (1986) and Final Analysis (1992).

While her first divorce was in the works, Basinger had romantic relationships with hairdresser/producer Jon Peters as well as singer Prince, who did the album for Batman and also produced her unreleased 1989 album Hollywood Affair. She was then involved briefly with fitness trainer Phil Walsh and fashion designer Alexio Gandara.

In 1990, Basinger met her second husband, Alec Baldwin, when they played lovers in The Marrying Man. They married on August 19, 1993, and starred in the 1994 remake of The Getaway. They also played themselves in a 1998 episode of The Simpsons, in which Basinger corrected Homer Simpson on the pronunciation of her surname and polished her Oscar statuette. Basinger and Baldwin have a daughter, Ireland, born October 23, 1995. They separated at the end of 2000 and divorced on September 3, 2002. In his 2008 book, A Promise to Ourselves: A Journey Through Fatherhood and Divorce, Baldwin chronicled the contentious seven-year custody battle with Basinger over their daughter following their separation, contending that she spent more than $1.5 million in her efforts to deny him parental access.

After the divorce from Baldwin, Basinger was reported to be romantically linked with 8 Mile (2002) co-star Eminem, which the rapper repeatedly denied. She would not have another public attachment until 2014, when she began dating Mitch Stone. Like Snyder and Peters before him, Stone is also Basinger's hairstylist. The couple wears matching gold bands and have since moved in together.

=== Financial problems ===
Some family members recommended Basinger buy the bulk of the privately owned land in the small town of Braselton, Georgia, some 1,691 acres in 1989, for $20 million, to establish it as a tourist attraction with movie studios and a film festival. However, she encountered financial difficulties and started to sell parts of it off in 1995. The town is now owned by developer Wayne Mason. In a 1998 interview with Barbara Walters, Basinger stated that "nothing good came out of it," because a rift resulted within her family.

Basinger's financial difficulties were exacerbated when she pulled out of the film Boxing Helena (1993), resulting in the studio winning an $8.9 million judgment against her. Basinger filed for bankruptcy and appealed the decision to a higher court, which ruled in her favor. She and the studio settled for $3.8 million instead.

=== Estrangement from family ===
Basinger's parents were legally married from 1948 to 2016, though they separated in 1980 and had little or no contact for the last 36 years of her father's life. Contrary to erroneous reports, they never divorced.

Starting in the mid-1990s, Basinger was estranged from her mother, Ann, and all but one of her four siblings. Her father Don and youngest sister Ashley were the only family members invited to her second wedding in 1993, and the only family members she thanked in her acceptance speech at the Academy Awards in 1998. Basinger was still estranged from her mother as of 2002. However, they appeared to have reconciled by 2015, when Ann told RadarOnline in an exclusive interview that Kim would be coming home to Georgia for Christmas.

=== Activism ===
Basinger is a vegetarian and an animal rights supporter. She has posed for anti-fur advertisements by PETA, and also filmed a public service announcement on downed farm animals for Farm Sanctuary. She was involved in the creation of a bill offering protection to diseased and crippled farm animals, which Governor of California Pete Wilson signed.

== Filmography and awards ==
After transitioning from modeling to acting in the late 1970s, Basinger has had over fifty credits in film and television productions, as of 2018. She garnered a Golden Globe Award nomination for Best Supporting Actress for her performance in The Natural (1984), and as part of the cast of Prêt-à-Porter (1994), she received an ensemble award from the National Board of Review. She won the Academy Award, a Golden Globe Award, a BAFTA Award, a Screen Actors Guild Award, and a Southeastern Film Critics Association Award for Best Supporting Actress in L.A. Confidential (1997).

Basinger received a nomination for the Best Actress Award from the Boston Society of Film Critics, for her role in The Door in the Floor (2004). Basinger has received seven nominations for the Razzie Awards—six for Worst Actress and one for Worst Supporting Actress—and has been nominated at the People's Choice Awards, the Saturn Awards (three times), and the MTV Movie Awards (four times). For her lifetime achievements in the cinematic arts, she has a motion pictures star on the Hollywood Walk of Fame.

Her most acclaimed and highest-grossing films include:

- Never Say Never Again (1983)
- The Natural (1984)
- 9½ Weeks (1986)
- Batman (1989)
- The Real McCoy (1993)
- Wayne's World 2 (1993)
- The Getaway (1994)
- L.A. Confidential (1997)
- 8 Mile (2002)
- The Door in the Floor (2004)
- Cellular (2004)
- The Sentinel (2006)
- Charlie St. Cloud (2010)
- The Nice Guys (2016)
- Fifty Shades Darker (2017)

== Discography ==
- 1989: The Scandalous Sex Suite EP with Prince, Warner Bros. Records
- 1990: Hollywood Affair (unreleased album)
- 1991: Too Hot to Handle EP: Music from the Original Motion Picture Soundtrack (to The Marrying Man), produced by Tim Hauser; Hollywood Records

== See also ==
- Bond girl
- List of stars on the Hollywood Walk of Fame
- List of actors with Academy Award nominations

== Bibliography ==
- Baldwin, Alec (2008). A Promise to Ourselves: A Journey Through Fatherhood and Divorce. New York: St. Martin's Press. ISBN 978-0-312-36336-9. OCLC 222666774.
- Britton, Ron (1998). Kim Basinger: Longer Than Forever: The True Story of Our Strange Marriage. Blake Publishing. ISBN 978-1-85782-325-7.
- Brownstone, David; Franck, Irene (1995). People in the News 1995. Macmillan Reference USA. ISBN 978-0-02-897058-5.
- Current Biography Yearbook. H.W. Wilson Company. 1991. ISBN 9780824201289.
- Georgia Alumni Record. Vol. 28. Alumni Society of the University of Georgia. 1948.
- Parish, James Robert (2007). The Hollywood Book of Extravagance: The Totally Infamous, Mostly Disastrous, and Always Compelling Excesses of America's Film and TV Idols. John Wiley & Sons. ISBN 978-0-470-05205-1.
- Denisoff, R. Serge; Romanowski, William D. (1991). Risky Business: Rock in Film. Transaction Publishers. ISBN 978-0-88738-843-9.
- Sherrow, Victoria (2006). Encyclopedia of Hair: A Cultural History. Greenwood Publishing Group. p. 72. ISBN 978-0-313-33145-9.
- Stephens, Autumn (1998). Drama Queens: Wild Women of the Silver Screen. Conari Press. ISBN 978-1-57324-136-6.
