= No Mercy (1986 film) =

1986 film by Richard Pearce

- Theatrical release poster
- Directed by: Richard Pearce
- Written by: Jim Carabatsos
- Produced by: D. Constantine Conte
- Starring: Richard Gere; Kim Basinger
- Cinematography: Michel Brault
- Edited by: Gerald B. Greenberg; Bill Yahraus
- Music by: Alan Silvestri
- Production company: Delphi Productions
- Distributed by: TriStar Pictures
- Release date: December 19, 1986
- Running time: 108 minutes
- Country: United States
- Language: English
- Budget: $14 million
- Box office: $12.3 million (US)

No Mercy is a 1986 American neo-noir action thriller film starring Richard Gere and Kim Basinger about a policeman who accepts an offer to kill a Cajun gangster. The film grossed over $12 million domestically.

== Plot ==
Eddie Jilette is a Chicago cop on the vengeance trail as he follows his partner's killers to New Orleans to settle his own personal score. Eddie flees through the Louisiana bayous with Michel Duval, the beautiful Cajun mistress of a murderous crime lord who aims to destroy the Chicago detective before he can avenge his partner's murder. Michel and Eddie fall for each other, although they clash repeatedly while handcuffed together as they attempt to elude the brutal underworld figure and his henchmen.

== Cast ==
- Richard Gere as Eddie Jillette
- Kim Basinger as Michel Duval
- Jeroen Krabbé as Losado
- George Dzundza as Captain Stemkowski
- Gary Basaraba as Joe Collins
- William Atherton as Allan Deveneux
- Terry Kinney as Paul Deveneux
- Ely Pouget as Julia Fischer
- Bruce McGill as Lieutenant Hall
- Ray Sharkey as Angles Ryan
- Marita Geraghty as Alice Collins
- Aleta Mitchell as Cara
- Fred Gratton as Quiet
- Dionisio as Pinto
- Kim Chan as Old Asian Man
- George Dickerson as Reblue
- Charles S. Dutton as Sergeant Sandy

== Reception ==
=== Critical response ===
No Mercy received poor reviews from critics and currently holds a 31% rating on Rotten Tomatoes from 16 reviews, although reviewers praised Gere's performance and the film's atmosphere.
