= The Marrying Man =

1991 film by Jerry Rees

- Theatrical release poster
- Directed by: Jerry Rees
- Written by: Neil Simon
- Produced by: David Permut
- Starring: Kim Basinger; Alec Baldwin; Robert Loggia; Elisabeth Shue; Armand Assante
- Cinematography: Donald Thorin
- Edited by: Michael Tronick; Michael Jablow; Michael R. Miller
- Music by: David Newman
- Production companies: Hollywood Pictures; Silver Screen Partners IV
- Distributed by: Buena Vista Pictures Distribution
- Release date: April 5, 1991
- Running time: 116 minutes
- Country: United States
- Language: English
- Budget: $26 million
- Box office: $12.5 million

The Marrying Man (known as Too Hot to Handle in the United Kingdom, Australia, and the Philippines) is a 1991 American romantic comedy film, directed by Jerry Rees, written by Neil Simon, and starring Alec Baldwin and Kim Basinger.

Ahead of the release of The Marrying Man, Premiere magazine published articles detailing a tumultuous production, with actors Baldwin and Basinger portrayed as unprofessional. Production challenges led to a ballooned budget of $26 million. The film opened to poor reviews and did not break out at the box office, with Basinger's performance earning her a nomination for the Golden Raspberry Award for Worst Actress, where she lost to Sean Young for A Kiss Before Dying at the 12th Golden Raspberry Awards. It held a 9% rating on Rotten Tomatoes. Critics found the film lacking in chemistry and believability, and shortly after its release Baldwin called it "the biggest mistake" of his career.

== Plot ==
In 1948, Charley Pearl is the heir to a toothpaste empire's fortune. He is a playboy who does not work, spending his time indulging in hobbies like speedboats and fast cars. Charley is engaged to Adele Horner, the daughter of Lew, a foul-mouthed, hot-tempered Hollywood studio mogul. Horner is concerned that Charley has no ambition and no apparent guilt about it.

Charley's four best friends accompany him on a drive to Las Vegas for a bachelor's fling. Charley is willing to foot the bill for Phil, Sammy, Tony and George but is eager to get back home to Adele. They make a quick stop for a drink at El Rancho Vegas where Vicki Anderson, a glamorous singer, disrupts Charley's thoughts of wedded bliss. He tries to pick up Vicki after her performance but is warned that she belongs to somebody else. Vicki responds to Charley's charm, however, and offers to leave a window open at her home. Charley shows up and they end up in bed, only to be caught by her other lover: Bugsy Siegel, the notorious Jewish-American organized crime figure and hitman.

Bugsy amuses himself with the notion that he will take the scared-stiff Vicki and Charley to a justice of the peace in the middle of the night and make them marry one another. Charley drives her back to California and offers to pay her expenses but Vicki walks out. In the meantime, their wedding photo pops up on the front page of the morning newspaper, with Charley's engagement announcement to Adele appearing on a later page. Charley apologizes and still wants to marry Adele. He agrees to Horner that he will get an annulment from Vicki and to pay a considerable sum to charity if he should dare disappoint Adele again.

Charley runs into Vicki again and can not help himself. Charley remarries Vicki, again leaving Adele in the lurch. Horner stops just short of killing Charley, instead sending Sam and Andy, a couple of thugs, to beat him and toss him into a swimming pool. Vicki comes home with an offer that could advance her career, only to learn that Charley's father has died and he is needed in Boston, where he is expected to run the family's business.

Vicki puts her career on hold and spends two years in Boston, enduring high society and boring tea parties. She can not wait to get back to California and her career, but when Charley reneges on his promise, Vicki gets a divorce. Charley and his friends track Vicki to a nightclub where she has taken up with Gus Denaro, another shady figure. They become involved in a violent brawl. Charley then makes off with Vicki and marries her a third time. As a gesture of gratitude, Charley sinks millions of dollars into a movie studio where he intends to produce pictures featuring Vicki. But while the careers of his buddies take off, Charley and Vicki begin to have children. Nothing at the new studio gets under way and Charley goes broke, blaming Vicki, who walks out on him yet again.

Divorced and depressed, Charley is found by his friends quite a bit later at a nightclub, where he tells them he has recently gone into a promising new line of work: computers. He stares dreamily at the stage where Vicki is performing her act. Charley shows his friends a diamond engagement ring that he has brought with him. Vicki slides it onto her finger.

== Cast ==
- Kim Basinger as Vicki Anderson
- Alec Baldwin as Charley Pearl
- Robert Loggia as Lew Horner
- Elisabeth Shue as Adele Horner
- Armand Assante as Bugsy Siegel
- Paul Reiser as Phil
- Fisher Stevens as Sammy
- Peter Dobson as Tony
- Steve Hytner as George
- Big John Studd as Dante
- Jeremy Roberts as Gus Denaro
- Tom Milanovich as Sam
- Tony Longo as Andy
- Tim Hauser as Woody
- Marla Heasley as Sheila
- Rebecca Staab as Arlene
- Paul Collins as Butler
- Alan Mandell as Justice #1
- Clarke Gordon as Mr. Pearl
- Gretchen Wyler as Gwen
- Susan Kellermann as Bobbie
- Kathryn Layng as Emma
- Don Keefer as Justice #3
- Kristen Cloke as Louise

== Production ==
A blistering pair of articles appeared in Premiere magazine ahead of the film's release detailing a "production from hell" and painting Alec Baldwin and Kim Basinger as petulant, spoiled and generally unprofessional. According to the reports, Baldwin and Basinger fell in love themselves at the beginning of the shoot and sometimes kept the entire crew waiting around for hours before showing up on set. Baldwin threw violent temper tantrums during which he tossed a chair, smashed camera lenses, punched a dent in his trailer and swore at crew members, while Basinger refused to do extra takes, demanded constant delays to fix her hair and caused Neil Simon to storm off the set after she said to him one day, "This isn't funny. Whoever wrote this doesn't understand comedy." The production difficulties caused the budget to balloon from $15 million to $26 million. When the production was over, producer David Permut presented each member of the crew with a T-shirt emblazoned with the phrase, "I survived the reshoot of The Marrying Man."

== Music ==
The soundtrack to the film was arranged by David Newman. A number of jazz standards are performed in the film, including "Let's Do It, Let's Fall in Love", "Honeysuckle Rose" and "Love Is the Thing" by Vicki Anderson (Basinger), and "You're Driving Me Crazy" by Tony (Peter Dobson). A Too Hot to Handle EP: Music from the Original Motion Picture Soundtrack was released, produced by Tim Hauser of Hollywood Records, featuring those songs and others which appeared in the film such as "Murder, He Says", "Why Can't You Behave?" and "Satisfy My Soul", also sung by Basinger. "You're Driving Me Crazy" was actually sung by Alan Paul. Newman arranged "Backstage Beat-Up" and "Run, Charley, Run!".

== Reception ==
The Marrying Man was panned by critics, as the film holds a 9% rating on Rotten Tomatoes, based on 22 reviews. Audiences surveyed by CinemaScore gave the film a grade of "B" on scale of A+ to F.

Vincent Canby of The New York Times described the film as "a bore. Mr. Baldwin and Miss Basinger are attractive players, but their comic potential remains unexplored here. Even when they're having steamy sex on the screen, very little of the excitement is shared by the audience." Roger Ebert gave the film three stars out of four and likened it to "those lightweight, atmospheric comedies of the postwar era, in which the chemistry between the stars covered up for a certain lack of logic, continuity and polish. The movie has rough edges and a slapdash air about it, but somehow it works, perhaps because Basinger and Baldwin throw themselves with such abandon into their roles." Dave Kehr of the Chicago Tribune gave the film one star out of four and stated, "Uniting a collection of characters that seem to belong to no known universe and an array of artificial plot devices that only a desperate screenwriter (in this case, Neil Simon) could love, The Marrying Man never gathers the slightest conviction or credibility." Variety panned the film as "a stillborn romantic comedy of staggering ineptitude." Peter Rainer of the Los Angeles Times wrote that the film had "a terrific comic premise" but that Baldwin and Basinger "don't really make for a great match, and given the film's premise, that's a fatal problem. The crazy lust that would make these two keep going at each other year after year and marriage after marriage just isn't on the screen." Peter Travers of Rolling Stone described the film as "conspicuously mediocre" and suggested, "Somebody should have made a movie of the [Premiere] article, since all the fireworks were off camera."

Shortly after the film's release, Baldwin called it "the biggest mistake of my career."
